= Forti FG01 =

Forti FG01 Forti FG01B
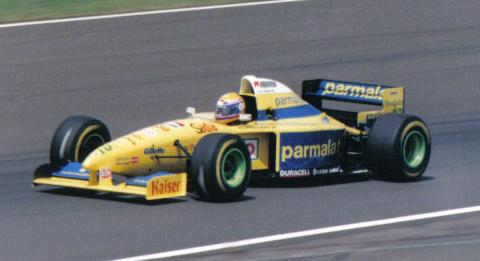
- Category: Formula One
- Constructor: Forti
- Designers: Giacomo Caliri (Executive Engineer); Sergio Rinland (Technical Director); Giorgio Stirano (Chief Designer); Chris Radage (Head of Design); Hans Fouche (Head of Aerodynamics)
- Successor: FG03

Technical specifications
- Chassis: Carbon-fibre monocoque
- Suspension (front): Double wishbones, pushrod
- Suspension (rear): As front
- Axle track: Front: 1,700 mm (67 in); Rear: 1,600 mm (63 in)
- Wheelbase: 2,950 mm (116 in)
- Engine: Ford-Cosworth EDD1 3-litre V8 (75°) (1995); Ford Zetec-R 3-litre V8 (90°) (1996) mid-engined
- Transmission: Hewland six-speed manual/semi-automatic
- Power: 630–660 hp (470–490 kW)
- Weight: Chassis weight (tub): 42 kg (93 lb); Formula weight: 595 kg (1,312 lb) (including driver)
- Fuel: Elf
- Lubricants: STP
- Tyres: Goodyear

Competition history
- Notable entrants: Parmalat Forti Ford (1995); Forti Grand Prix (1996)
- Notable drivers: 21. (Brazil) Pedro Diniz (1995); 22. (Brazil) Roberto Moreno (1995); 22. (Italy) Luca Badoer (1996); 23. (Italy) Andrea Montermini (1996)
- Debut: 1995 Brazilian Grand Prix
Races	Wins	Poles	F/Laps
22	0	0	0

The Forti FG01, also designated Forti FG01-95, was a Formula One car for the 1995 season and was the first car made by Forti. The number 21 seat was taken by rookie Pedro Diniz and the number 22 seat was taken by veteran Roberto Moreno. The team never employed a test driver. The engine was a Ford EDD 3.0 V8. The team's main sponsor was Parmalat. The FG01 is also notably the last F1 car to sport a conventional manual gearbox + H-pattern shifter, and was the only car to use one on the grid.

The car was designed by Giacomo Caliri and Giorgio Stirano, with input from Sergio Rinland, and was built at the team's base in Alessandria, Italy.

== Concept ==
Building its own car for the first time was the hardest task for the team (as required by the F1 regulations). This turned out to be the main obstacle for Guido Forti, as he insisted on having a reliable car built instead of a fast one. That was precisely what he received: his first F1 car, the Forti FG01, was an outdated, overweight and very slow machine, and has been described as nothing more than "a revised F3000 car" and, more harshly, "a fearful pile of junk".

"It simply wasn't efficient and we had to restart it. We took off more than 60 kg from the first version to the last and by Silverstone we were on the minimum weight limit. During the year we also had to re-homologate the nose and side pods, develop the semi-automatic gearbox, which was worth about half a second a lap, and redesign the monocoque, not in terms of shape but in terms of the lay-up of the skins."

— Giorgio Stirano on the problems experienced with the FG01.

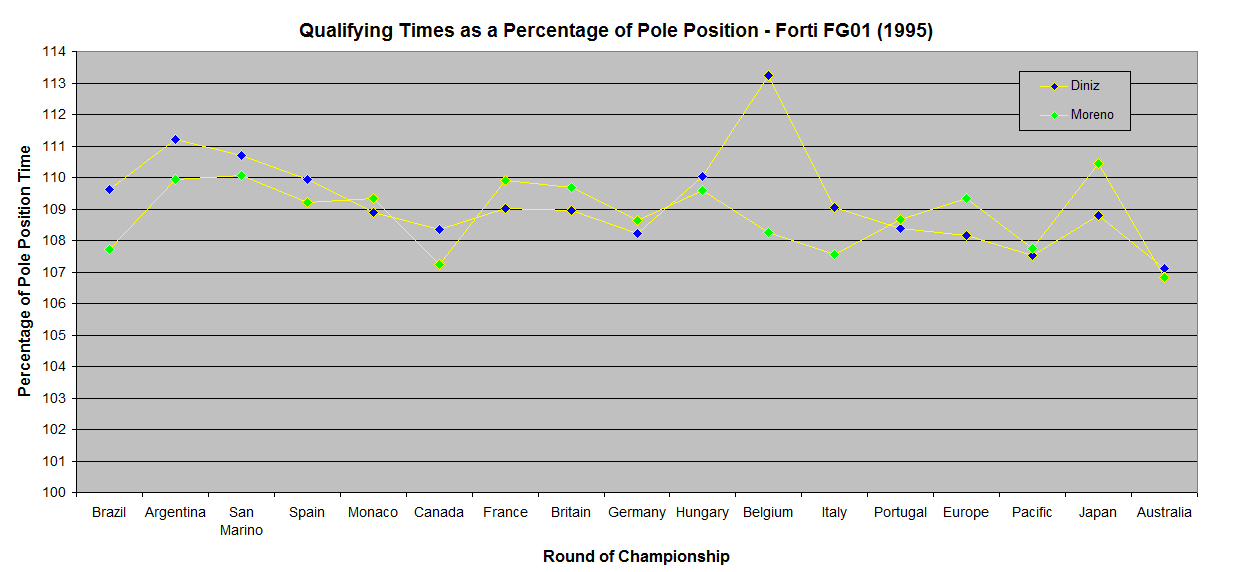
A graph of the FG01's qualifying performance throughout the 1995 season.

The FG01 had many influences. Its roots dated back to 1991 when former Brabham designer Rinland left the British team before the season ended. Rinland set up Astauto Ltd. in Tolworth, England, hiring several of his former collaborators from Brabham when the team closed its doors. Brabham sold the building and wind tunnel at Chessington to Yamaha, facilities that Astauto rented to develop the new Fondmetal GR02, which was designed and built by June 1992, just six months after it was commissioned by Gabriele Rumi. The Fondmetal GR02 was a natural successor of the Brabham BT60, in concept, as it was conceived by the same design team. Due to Fondmetal's own severe financial troubles, the GR02 was run only in a few races before the team was closed. When in late 1994, Forti bought the remains of the Fondmetal Team, acquiring all the spares of the GR02 in the process, the team then turned to Rinland to purchase the design of what would have been the 1993 F1 car design by the Astauto Design Team after the collapse of the Fondmetal team. At that time, Rinland was living and working in California on a new ChampCar project. Forti sent his Chief Designer and former Astauto employee Chris Radage to California to gather all the technical information, data and drawings from Rinland, returning to Italy to design and develop the new Forti FG01. Rinland joined the team in early 1995 for a short period as Technical Director, once he had returned to Europe. Rinland assisted experienced Italian engineers Giorgio Stirano and Giacomo Caliri in designing the car. The car's aerodynamics were completed by former Brabham employee Hans Fouche using wind-tunnels in South Africa, and composite work was done by the Belco Avia company. However, it was rumoured that the FG01 was little more than a re-working of the GR02.

Thus the FG01 did not promise much in terms of performance. It was angular and bulky, with poor aerodynamic performance negatively affecting grip and handling; it had a plump nose, initially no airbox, and was overweight and under-powered, using a small Ford-Cosworth ED V8 customer engine largely financed by Ford Brasil, which developed an estimated 100 bhp less than the most powerful engine in the field, the Renault V10 supplied to the Benetton and Williams teams. It was also the only car to have a manual gearbox in the 1995 F1 season. The only attractive thing about the car was its blue and yellow colour scheme accompanied by fluorescent green wheel-rims, illustrating the team's Brazilian influence in its first year. Rinland subsequently left the team after a few weeks, after falling out with the team's management over the car's lack of competitiveness.

For 1996, the car was upgraded to B specification, with Luca Badoer and Andrea Montermini on board. It was eventually replaced by the Forti FG03 car for the Monaco Grand Prix.

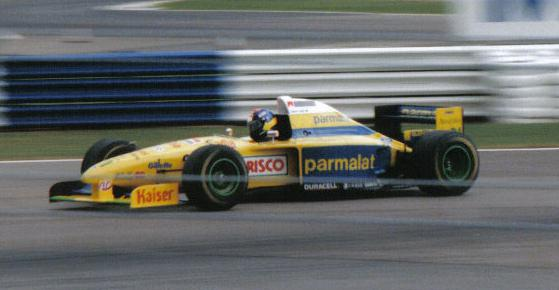
Pedro Diniz driving the FG01 at the 1995 British Grand Prix.

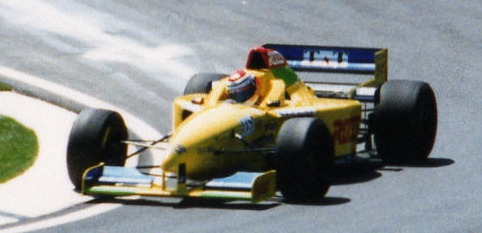
Andrea Montermini driving the revised FG01B at the 1996 San Marino Grand Prix.

== Complete Formula One World Championship results ==
(key)

Year	Chassis	Engine	Tyres	Drivers	1	2	3	4	5	6	7	8	9	10	11	12	13	14	15	16	17	Points	WCC
1995	Forti FG01	Ford ED V8	G		BRA	ARG	SMR	ESP	MON	CAN	FRA	GBR	GER	HUN	BEL	ITA	POR	EUR	PAC	JPN	AUS	0	NC
1995	Forti FG01	Ford ED V8	G	Pedro Diniz	10	NC	NC	Ret	10	Ret	Ret	Ret	Ret	Ret	13	9	16	13	17	Ret	7	0	NC
1995	Forti FG01	Ford ED V8	G	Roberto Moreno	Ret	NC	NC	Ret	Ret	Ret	16	Ret	Ret	Ret	14	DNS	17	Ret	16	Ret	Ret	0	NC
1996	Forti FG01B	Ford Zetec-R V8	G		AUS	BRA	ARG	EUR	SMR	MON	ESP	CAN	FRA	GBR	GER	HUN	BEL	ITA	POR	JPN		0	NC
1996	Forti FG01B	Ford Zetec-R V8	G	Luca Badoer	DNQ	11	Ret	DNQ														0	NC
1996	Forti FG01B	Ford Zetec-R V8	G	Andrea Montermini	DNQ	Ret	10	DNQ	DNQ													0	NC
