= Sauber C15 =

Formula One racing car

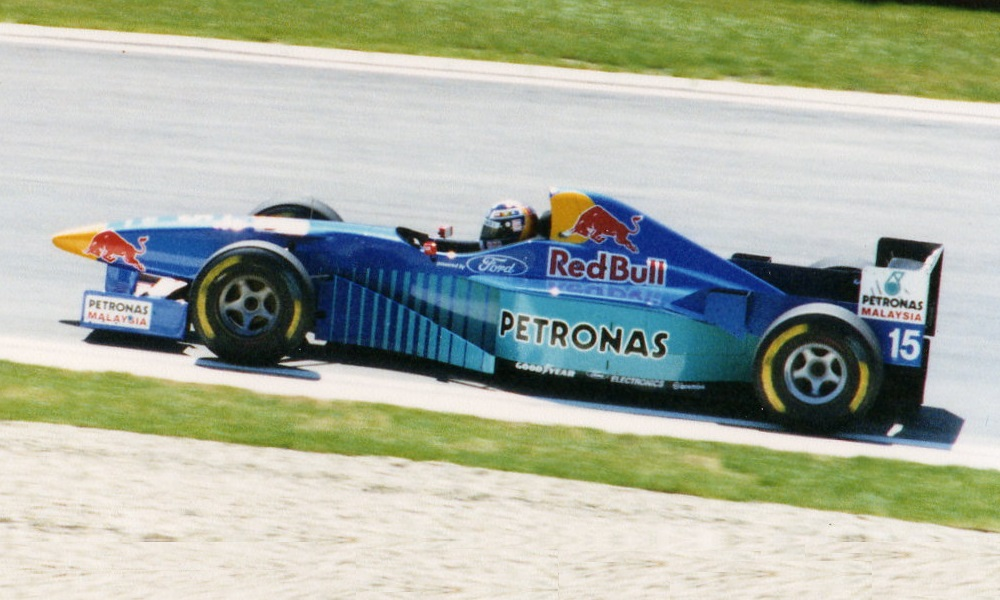
- Heinz-Harald Frentzen driving the C15 at the 1996 San Marino Grand Prix
- Category: Formula One
- Constructor: Sauber
- Designers: Leo Ress (Technical Director); Ian Thomson (Head of Chassis Design); Rene Hilhorst (Head of Aerodynamics); Mike Jennings (Chief Aerodynamicist); Martin Walters (Chief Engine Designer, Ford Cosworth)
- Predecessor: Sauber C14
- Successor: Sauber C16

Technical specifications
- Chassis: carbon-fibre and honeycomb composite structure
- Suspension (front): double wishbones, combined spring/damper units, pushrod
- Suspension (rear): double wishbones, combined spring/damper units, pushrod
- Engine: Ford JD Zetec-R, 72° V10, NA
- Transmission: Sauber/Xtrac six-speed longitudinal semi-automatic
- Power: 670 hp (499.6 kW) @ 15,800 rpm
- Fuel: Castrol (Note: Petronas branding appeared on C14, but the car used Castrol fuels and lubricants.)
- Tyres: Goodyear

Competition history
- Notable entrants: Red Bull Sauber Ford
- Notable drivers: 14. (United Kingdom) Johnny Herbert; 15. (Germany) Heinz-Harald Frentzen
- Debut: 1996 Australian Grand Prix
- Last event: 1996 Japanese Grand Prix
Races	Wins	Podiums	Poles	F/Laps
16	0	1	0	0
- Constructors' Championships: 0
- Drivers' Championships: 0

The Sauber C15 was the car with which the Sauber team competed in the 1996 Formula One World Championship. It was powered by the Ford Zetec-R V10 engine and driven by German Heinz-Harald Frentzen, who was in his third season with the team, and Briton Johnny Herbert, who moved from Benetton.

== Overview ==
After an encouraging performance in 1995 with a full-works Ford V8 engine, 1996 did not confirm the progress Sauber had made during 1995 because as the team developed the troublesome Zetec-R V10, problems with the new unit's power delivery resulted in the team scoring only 11 points, despite the theoretical power advantage over a V8. That score, compared to its 1995 tally of 18 points was fairly little bearing in mind that in 1995 Sauber had a significant performance difference between Heinz-Harald Frentzen and his respective team-mate (Karl Wendlinger in the first four and the last two races of 1995, and Jean-Christophe Boullion during the rest of that season) while that was not the case in 1996.

The drivers proved well-matched, with Frentzen having a slight edge over Herbert. However, the German left the team at the end of the year to join champions Williams for 1997. The team's second podium finish since its F1 début in 1993 was scored by Herbert at the chaotic 1996 Monaco Grand Prix, with Frentzen in fourth. Heinz-Harald scored further points at Catalunya and Suzuka.

The team eventually finished seventh in the Constructors' Championship, with 11 points.

== Livery ==
The C15 features a brighter shade of blue livery with a teal dash pattern on the side of the car; as the team now utilized Petronas fuels and lubricants.

== Complete Formula One results ==
(key) (results in bold indicate pole position)

Year	Team	Engine	Tyres	Drivers	1	2	3	4	5	6	7	8	9	10	11	12	13	14	15	16	Points	WCC
1996	Red Bull Sauber Ford	Ford V10	**G**		AUS	BRA	ARG	EUR	SMR	MON	ESP	CAN	FRA	GBR	GER	HUN	BEL	ITA	POR	JPN	**11**	**7th**
1996	Red Bull Sauber Ford	Ford V10	**G**	(United Kingdom) Johnny Herbert	DNS	Ret	9	7	Ret	3	Ret	7	DSQ	9	Ret	Ret	Ret	9	8	10	**11**	**7th**
1996	Red Bull Sauber Ford	Ford V10	**G**	(Germany) Heinz-Harald Frentzen	8	Ret	Ret	Ret	Ret	4	4	Ret	Ret	8	8	Ret	Ret	Ret	7	6	**11**	**7th**
