= Forti FG03 =

Formula One car

- Luca Badoer driving the Forti FG03 at the 1996 Canadian Grand Prix.
- Category: Formula One
- Constructor: Forti Corse
- Designers: George Ryton (Technical Director); Chris Radage (Chief Designer); Riccardo de Marco (Head of Design)
- Predecessor: FG01B

Technical specifications
- Chassis: Carbon fibre and honeycomb composite monocoque
- Suspension (front): Unequal length wishbones, pushrod
- Suspension (rear): As front
- Axle track: F: 1,680 mm (66 in); R: 1,600 mm (63 in)
- Wheelbase: 2,981 mm (117.4 in)
- Engine: Ford ECA Zetec-R 90-degree V8 mid-mounted
- Transmission: Hewland 6-speed sequential semi-automatic
- Weight: 595 kg (1,312 lb)
- Fuel: Elf
- Tyres: Goodyear

Competition history
- Notable entrants: Forti Grand Prix
- Notable drivers: 22. (Italy) Luca Badoer; 23. (Italy) Andrea Montermini
- Debut: 1996 San Marino Grand Prix
| Races | Wins | Poles | F/Laps |
|---|---|---|---|
| 6 | 0 | 0 | 0 |
- Constructors' Championships: 0
- Drivers' Championships: 0

The Forti FG03 was the car with which the Forti team competed in part of the 1996 Formula One season. It was designed by Chris Radage and Riccardo de Marco. It was driven by Luca Badoer and Andrea Montermini, both of whom were in their first year with the team.

== Overview ==
The car was designed as a replacement for the slow, cumbersome "B" version of the FG01 that the team had used to limited effect in 1995 and at the beginning of 1996. Introduced at Imola, it was a major step forward in terms of downforce and sensitivity; however, it only finished once, at its debut race, and both drivers failed to make the 107% time for the Spanish and British Grands Prix. Ultimately, the FG03 was too little, too late, and Forti folded at the German GP.

The team came last in the Constructors' Championship, with no points.

== Livery ==
The FG03 was originally ran with a yellow paint livery. Ahead of the Spanish Grand Prix, Shannon Racing took over the team with a new green and white livery.

== Later uses ==
A FG03 is currently used for F1 experiences in Northamptonshire.

The car was competed in the BOSS GP Series in 2016, 2018 and 2019.

== Complete Formula One results ==
(key)

| Year | Team | Engine | Tyres | Drivers | 1 | 2 | 3 | 4 | 5 | 6 | 7 | 8 | 9 | 10 | 11 | 12 | 13 | 14 | 15 | 16 | Points | WCC |
|---|---|---|---|---|---|---|---|---|---|---|---|---|---|---|---|---|---|---|---|---|---|---|
| 1996 | Forti | Ford Zetec R ECA V8 | G | | AUS | BRA | ARG | EUR | SMR | MON | ESP | CAN | FRA | GBR | GER | HUN | BEL | ITA | POR | JPN | 0 | 11th |
| 1996 | Forti | Ford Zetec R ECA V8 | G | Luca Badoer | | | | | 10 | Ret | DNQ | Ret | Ret | DNQ | DNP | | | | | | 0 | 11th |
| 1996 | Forti | Ford Zetec R ECA V8 | G | Andrea Montermini | | | | | | DNS | DNQ | Ret | Ret | DNQ | DNP | | | | | | 0 | 11th |
