= Shannon Racing =

Shannon Racing, or the Shannon Racing Team, was a short-lived motorsport team that was briefly involved with the Forti Formula One team during the 1996 season. It was owned by a parent company known as FinFirst. Both entities were registered in the Republic of Ireland, but funded by Italian backers.

== Career ==
Shannon established an International Formula 3000 team in 1996, taking over the Danielson team and running drivers Tom Kristensen and Luca Rangoni, and was also active in Formula Three. Kristensen took a pole position and fastest lap in the F3000 team's second race, but the campaign was cut short as Shannon entered Formula One part-way through the season.

The team was known to be keen to move up to F1, and was expected to enter the 1998 season, but instead chose to buy 51% of the financially struggling Forti team prior to the 1996 Spanish Grand Prix. The deal resulted in the Forti cars switching from a yellow to a green, white and red livery. The deal, however, fell through and resulted in a dispute between Shannon and Guido Forti over ownership of the team, with Forti alleging non-payment. The case went to court and resulted in the team running out of money and withdrawing from Formula One, meaning that Shannon's eventual victory was essentially meaningless. By the end of the season, the teams run by Shannon in other formulae had also ceased to exist.

== Racing record ==
=== Complete International Formula 3000 results ===
(key) (Races in bold indicate pole position) (Races in italics indicate fastest lap)

Year	Chassis	Engine	Tyres	Drivers	1	2	3	4	5	6	7	8	9	10	TC	Points
1996	Lola T96/50	Zytek-Judd	A		NUR	PAU	PER	HOC	SIL	SPA	MAG	EST	MUG	HOC	10th	4
1996	Lola T96/50	Zytek-Judd	A	Tom Kristensen	4	**Ret**									10th	4
1996	Lola T96/50	Zytek-Judd	A	Luca Rangoni		6									10th	4

=== Complete Formula One results (as owner of Forti) ===
(key) (Races in bold indicate pole position) (Races in italics indicate fastest lap)

Year	Entrant	Chassis	Engine	Tyres	Drivers	1	2	3	4	5	6	7	8	9	10	11	12	13	14	15	16	Points	WCC
1996	Forti Grand Prix	Forti FG03	Ford Zetec-R V8	**G**		AUS	BRA	ARG	EUR	SMR	MON	ESP	CAN	FRA	GBR	GER	HUN	BEL	ITA	POR	JPN	**0**	**NC**
1996	Forti Grand Prix	Forti FG03	Ford Zetec-R V8	**G**	Luca Badoer							DNQ	Ret	Ret	DNQ	DNP						**0**	**NC**
1996	Forti Grand Prix	Forti FG03	Ford Zetec-R V8	**G**	Andrea Montermini							DNQ	Ret	Ret	DNQ	DNP						**0**	**NC**
