= Forti =

Italian motor racing team

- Full name: Parmalat Forti Ford (1995); Forti Grand Prix (1996)
- Base: Alessandria, Italy
- Founder(s): Guido Forti; Paolo Guerci
- Noted staff: Giacomo Caliri; Daniele Coronna; Riccardo de Marco; Cesare Fiorio; Hans Fouche; Carlo Gancia; Chris Radage; Sergio Rinland; George Ryton; Giorgio Stirano
- Noted drivers: (Italy) Luca Badoer (Brazil) Pedro Diniz (Italy) Andrea Montermini (Brazil) Roberto Moreno

Formula One World Championship career
- First entry: 1995 Brazilian Grand Prix
- Races entered: 27 (43 starts from 54 entries)
- Constructors' Championships: 0
- Drivers' Championships: 0
- Race victories: 0 (best result: 7th, 1995 Australian Grand Prix)
- Podiums: 0
- Points: 0
- Pole positions: 0 (best result: 19th, 1996 Brazilian Grand Prix)
- Fastest laps: 0 (Best: 10th, 1996 Monaco Grand Prix)
- Final entry: 1996 British Grand Prix

Forti Corse, commonly known as Forti, was an Italian motor racing team chiefly known for its brief and unsuccessful involvement in Formula One in the mid-1990s. It was established in the late 1970s and competed in lower formulae for two decades. The team's successes during this period included four Drivers' Championships in Italian Formula Three during the 1980s, and race wins in the International Formula 3000 championship, in which it competed from 1987 to 1994. From 1992, team co-founder Guido Forti developed a relationship with the wealthy Brazilian businessman Abílio dos Santos Diniz that gave Diniz's racing driver son, Pedro, a permanent seat in the team and the outfit a sufficiently high budget to consider entering Formula One.

Forti graduated to Formula One as a constructor and entrant in 1995, but its first car—the Forti FG01—proved to be uncompetitive, and the team failed to score a point. Despite this setback, Forti was committed to a three-year deal with Diniz, which was broken when Pedro moved to the Ligier team prior to the 1996 season, taking most of the team's sponsorship money with him. Nevertheless, Forti continued to compete in the sport, and produced the much-improved FG03 chassis, before succumbing to financial problems mid-season after an ultimately fruitless deal with a mysterious entity known as Shannon Racing. The team competed in a total of 27 Grands Prix, scoring no points, and is recognised as one of the last truly privateer teams to race in an era when many large car manufacturers were increasing their involvement in the sport.

== Establishment and early years ==
Forti was founded by Italian businessmen Guido Forti, a former driver, and Paolo Guerci, an engineer, in the late 1970s and was based in Alessandria in northern Italy. It was registered as a Società a Responsabilità Limitata, or Limited liability company. It was initially run in lower motor racing categories such as Formula Ford and Formula Three, both at Italian and European levels. The team was well equipped and soon became a regular winner. Forti drivers Franco Forini, Enrico Bertaggia, Emanuele Naspetti and Gianni Morbidelli (who would all go on to drive in Formula One) won Italian Formula Three titles in 1985, 1987, 1988 and 1989 respectively. In addition, Bertaggia won the prestigious Macau F3 Grand Prix and the Monaco Grand Prix F3 support race in 1988, and Morbidelli won the FIA European Formula Three Cup in 1989. Teo Fabi and Oscar Larrauri also raced for the team in its early years, the former winning the Italian FFord 2000 championship in 1977, and the latter racing as far afield as South America, in the Argentine Formula Three Championship. Forti continued racing in Formula Three until the end of 1992, when it quit the formula in order to concentrate solely on International Formula 3000.

== Formula 3000 ==
Hideki Noda driving for the Forti International Formula 3000 team during the 1994 season.

For 1987, Forti moved up to International Formula 3000 with less immediate success than experienced in Formula Three. The main reason for this was the chassis the team chose to compete with. Instead of using customer Lolas, Marches or Ralts, all of which were produced by established companies who had many years' experience of designing and building such cars, Forti stuck with their Italian Formula Three chassis supplier Giampaolo Dallara, who had just designed his company's first F3000 machine. Forti was the first team to use this machine, which was dubbed the Dallara 3087 (a chassis which later would make a single appearance in Formula One for the BMS Scuderia Italia team, as that team's car was not ready for the first race of the 1988 season). This combination of an inexperienced team and an untested car did not score any points in its first F3000 year, nor did the team attend every race on the schedule. Forti used 1988 to gain valuable experience in F3000, and this helped the team to perform better in following seasons, as did a change to more competitive Lola and then Reynard chassis.

After a full season in 1988 and the team's first championship points, courtesy of Claudio Langes in 1989, it became apparent that Forti was improving as a competitive force. In 1990, Gianni Morbidelli scored Forti's first victory in an F3000 race, and although no Forti driver won a championship title in this category, the team established itself as a frequent front-runner, scoring nine wins and five pole positions in International F3000. From 1993 onwards, Forti concentrated solely on F3000, and ran drivers such as Naspetti, Fabrizio Giovanardi, Andrea Montermini and Hideki Noda. 1991 was Forti's most successful season in F3000, with Naspetti finishing third in the Drivers' Championship, ten points behind champion Christian Fittipaldi. Although the team's form dipped over subsequent years, by 1994 Forti was the most experienced team in the championship, employing Noda and Pedro Diniz as drivers.

== Formula One ==
=== Preparation ===
As his team became more successful, Guido Forti started to think about a move upwards, into Formula One. However, there had been several discouragingly recent examples of teams, such as Coloni and Onyx, which had graduated from F3000 into Formula One and failed more or less immediately due to a lack of finance. Conversely, Eddie Jordan had shown that the move could be made successfully, with an impressive performance in 1991 with his Jordan team, which had finished fifth in the Constructors' Championship with a total of seven points-scoring finishes. Forti considered a solid financial base to be the most important factor for success. In 1991 he therefore started working on his Formula One project. At the end of 1992, he signed a deal with wealthy Brazilian driver Pedro Diniz, whose personal fortune and sponsorship connections proved invaluable in increasing the team's budget. Diniz's father, Abílio dos Santos, was the owner of the large Brazilian distribution company Companhia Brasileira de Distribuição and the supermarket chain Pão de Açúcar. By offering companies preferential product-placement in the Brazilian market, the Diniz family was able to obtain personal sponsorship deals with brands such as Arisco, Duracell, Gillette, Kaiser, Marlboro, Parmalat and Sadia, in addition to backing from Unibanco, to fund Pedro's career. By 1993, through Abílio dos Santos, Forti met Carlo Gancia, an Italo-Brazilian businessman. Gancia became a co-owner of the team, buying Guerci's shares, and started working on the team's Formula One project. He finally managed to ensure a respectable budget for Formula One by late 1994, which was "effectively underwritten by the Diniz family". He also hired several experienced personnel, including designer Sergio Rinland and former Ferrari team manager Cesare Fiorio. Furthermore, retired driver René Arnoux was employed as a consultant and driver coach for Diniz. Guerci remained with Forti as one of its race engineers.

This securing of financial assistance and recruitment of staff meant that Forti's ability to participate in Formula One for 1995 was assured. Financed by the companies brought in by Abílio Diniz, the team was guaranteed financial stability in the short term, with a claimed first year budget of around $17 million. In addition, this was only the first year of a planned three-year contract with Diniz and his backers.

=== Forti FG01 car ===
The hardest task for the team was designing and building its own car for the first time, instead of buying one from a general supplier such as Dallara or Lola, as was required by the Formula One Technical Regulations. Guido Forti's first attempt at an F1 chassis, the Forti FG01, resulted in an outdated, overweight and very slow machine, and has been described as nothing more than "a revised F3000 car" and, more harshly, "a fearful pile of junk".

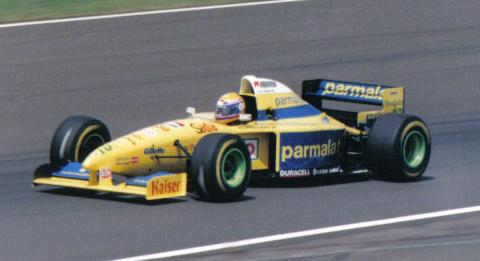
Roberto Moreno driving the FG01 at the 1995 British Grand Prix. He retired on lap 48 when the car's hydraulic pressure dropped.

"It simply wasn't efficient and we had to restart it. We took off more than 60 kg from the first version to the last and by Silverstone [for the 1995 British Grand Prix] we were on the minimum weight limit. During the year we also had to re-homologate the nose and side pods, develop the semi-automatic gearbox, which was worth about half a second a lap, and redesign the monocoque, not in terms of shape but in terms of the lay-up of the skins."

— Giorgio Stirano on the problems experienced with the FG01.

The FG01 had many influences. Design consultant Rinland had previously worked on the Brabham BT60 chassis in 1991 and Fondmetal GR02 chassis in 1992, the latter under the auspices of his own company, Astauto, before moving to the United States to work on a Champ Car project. In late 1994, Forti bought the remaining assets of the now defunct Fondmetal team, including the remaining GR02 chassis, and requested Rinland's assistance in developing the bespoke Forti chassis based on a planned Fondmetal chassis for the 1993 season. Rinland thus provided a great deal of input on the FG01 chassis, assisting experienced Italian engineers Giorgio Stirano and Giacomo Caliri in designing and building the car. The car's aerodynamics were completed by former Brabham, Fondmetal and Astauto employee Hans Fouche using wind tunnels in South Africa, and composite work was done by the Belco Avia company. However, it was rumoured that the FG01 was little more than a re-working of the GR02.

Thus the FG01 did not promise much in terms of performance. It was angular and bulky, with poor aerodynamic performance negatively affecting grip and handling; it had a plump nose, initially no airbox, and was overweight and under-powered, using a small Ford-Cosworth ED V8 customer engine largely financed by Ford do Brasil, which developed an estimated 100 bhp less than the most powerful engine in the field, the Renault V10 supplied to the Benetton and Williams teams. It was also the only car to have a manual gearbox in the 1995 F1 season. The car was liveried in a distinctive yellow-and-blue colour scheme accompanied by fluorescent green wheel-rims, illustrating the team's Brazilian influence in its first year. The precise hue of each colour was chosen as a tribute to Ayrton Senna, who had been killed at the 1994 San Marino Grand Prix; the cars were liveried in identical shades to those used on the Brazilian's helmet design.

=== 1995 season ===
Forti's number one driver for the 1995 season was rookie Pedro Diniz who had raced for Forti in F3000, but without much success. However, he was guaranteed a seat as his family and sponsors were paying a significant amount of the team's budget. The second driver was later confirmed as his more experienced compatriot Roberto Moreno, who had last competed in F1 back in 1992 when he had a disastrous year driving for the infamous Andrea Moda team. However, his seat was initially only guaranteed on a race-by-race basis, as Portuguese driver Pedro Lamy, in addition to the team's former F3000 drivers Emanuele Naspetti and Andrea Montermini, were also considered. It was speculated that whoever joined the team would be contractually bound to be number two to Diniz and that his father had insisted on an all-Brazilian driver line-up. A Forti spokesman indeed confirmed that Moreno's nationality, in addition to his experience, was the main reason for his selection. The team later attempted to enter its former F3000 driver Hideki Noda for the 1995 Pacific Grand Prix, but he was refused an FIA Super Licence despite driving in three races for Larrousse in 1994.

Unlike some of the existing teams, Forti was able to test its chassis extensively prior to the start of the season. However, Diniz proved to be around seven seconds per lap off the pace of the leading runners in group testing at the Estoril circuit in March, indicating that the team was likely to be mired at the back of the field. Diniz finished 10th in the season-opening Brazilian GP, but was seven laps down on winner Michael Schumacher. In Argentina, this situation became worse, as, although both drivers finished, they were both nine laps down on winner Damon Hill at the end of the race (with Diniz ahead) and neither were classified, as they had failed to complete 90% of the race distance. The drivers' similar fastest laps during the race were over ten seconds slower than Schumacher's fastest race lap, and almost five seconds slower than the next slowest runner's fastest lap (Domenico Schiattarella in the Simtek). Imola was similarly poor, as both drivers finished seven laps down (with Diniz again ahead) and again failed to reach the 90 per cent threshold for classification. Forti was already the butt of paddock jokes, and were far slower than the other (and financially poorer) backmarkers: Pacific, Simtek, and Minardi. However, the budget enabled improvements to be made to the car. During the season, its weight was reduced by a significant 60 kilograms (approximately 10 per cent of the F1 minimum weight limit of 595 kg (1,312 lb)), and a semi-automatic gearbox, an airbox and redesigns of the front wing, sidepods and monocoque were introduced. The personnel count also doubled during the course of the season. This resulted in a gradual improvement in pace throughout the year, and there were no more non-classified finishes.

In between the Brazilian and Argentine Grands Prix, Rinland returned to Europe full-time to take the official post of the team's Technical Director. His long-term task was to establish an English-based design office for the team, but his initial job was to improve the competitiveness of the FG01 through a series of technical upgrades. However, Rinland subsequently left the team after a few weeks, after falling out with the team's management over the car's lack of competitiveness.

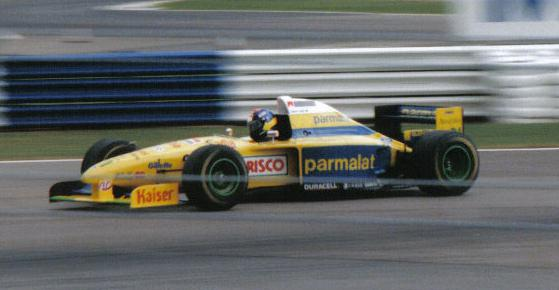
Pedro Diniz driving the FG01 at the 1995 British GP. He retired on lap 13 with a broken gearbox.

Indeed, Forti's finishing record was good for rookies at 50 per cent (excluding the non-classifications), helping Diniz to establish a reputation as a steady, dependable driver. Forti were then elevated when Simtek folded after the Monaco GP, and Pacific's lack of finance and development enabled Forti to start matching them from the half-way point of the season. At the German GP, both Fortis outqualified both the Pacifics for the first time, and this happened on two further occasions during 1995. Forti's improvement was also aided by Pacific taking on two slower pay drivers, Giovanni Lavaggi and Jean-Denis Delétraz, to ensure that the team finished the season. At the final race of the season, in Adelaide, Forti seemed to have established a firm base for the 1996 season, emphasised by Moreno qualifying within 107% of pole position for the first time – a crucial result, as this percentage of the pole time would be used to determine non-qualifiers in 1996 – and Diniz scoring the team's best result in F1, with a reliable run to seventh place, ahead of Gachot in the Pacific. This was only one position behind the points-scoring placings. Nevertheless, despite not scoring any points, Forti finished a de facto 11th in the Constructors' Championship, ahead of Pacific and Simtek by virtue of better finishes outside of the points.

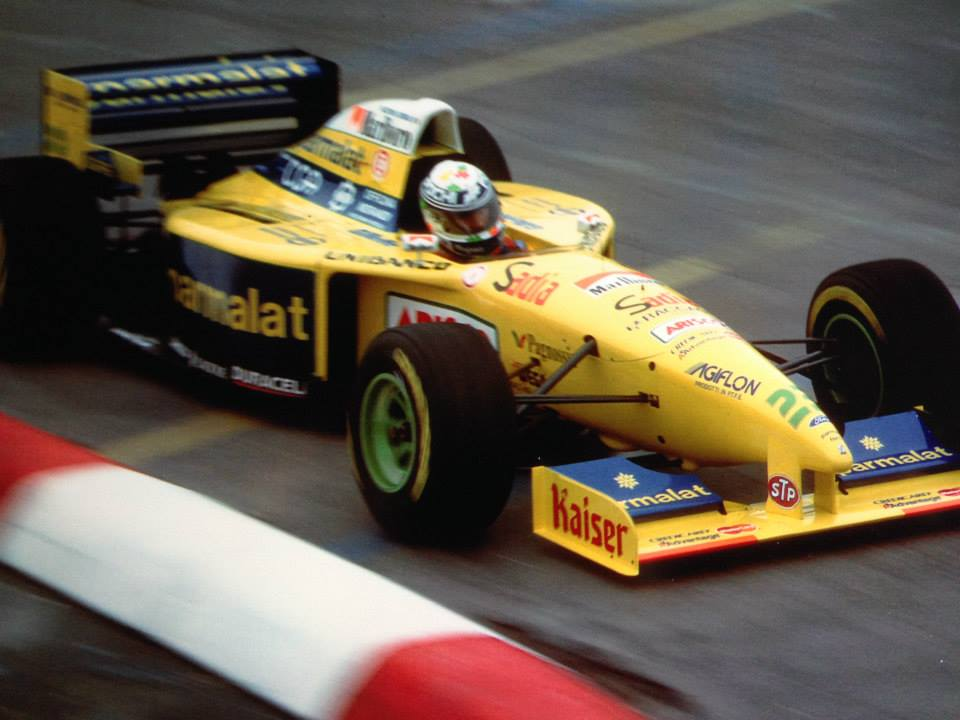
Vittorio Zoboli competing in the 1995 Bologna Motor Show.

Post-championship, Forti took part in the 1995 Bologna Motor Show, where three FG01s—driven by Montermini, Lavaggi and Vittorio Zoboli—raced against, and lost to three Minardis in the Formula One Indoor Trophy.

Despite the progress made by Forti during the course of the season, 1995 was still regarded as a failure. The team had spent more money than its immediate rivals in designing, building and developing a fundamentally inefficient car. Diniz and his sponsors were described as "throwing their money away", and the Brazilian's reputation as a serious F1 driver was damaged, as it took him several years to prove that he was not just in the sport because of his funding. In addition, Moreno's participation with Forti was lamented by many observers, who felt that the experienced driver did not deserve the ignominy of such an uncompetitive car. The only positives were the reasonable reliability record and the fact that the Diniz family were contracted to fund the team for the next two years.

=== 1996 season ===
A graph showing the Forti team's qualifying performances as a percentage of the pole position time throughout its involvement in Formula One. The 107% rule introduced for 1996 was a contributary factor to the team's failure mid-season.

With a solid base to build on and a healthy budget, 1996 looked promising for Forti. The team negotiated for the most powerful and expensive Cosworth V8 engines in late 1995 to replace the outdated and underpowered ED models, and its financial security was demonstrated by rumours during the 1995 season that the more competitive but less well-funded Minardi team was considering a merger with Forti as a means of maintaining its own presence in the sport. However, these aspirations were dealt a devastating blow when Pedro Diniz signed for the more competitive Ligier team, taking Martin Brundle's vacated seat as the latter moved to Jordan. Forti's sponsors brought in by the Diniz family, including Parmalat and Marlboro, all left; the budget was significantly dented. For a time it seemed that the team would not compete in 1996 at all, and its survival was constantly questioned. The new car was delayed, and the team was forced to use the uprated FG01B car for the start of the season with the only slightly more competitive Ford Zetec-R V8 engine (instead of the "JS" unit it had been negotiating for), and to rely on temporary sponsors. Nevertheless, Forti remained in the sport for the 1996 season. Moreno was not retained; the team signed Minardi and Pacific refugees Luca Badoer and Montermini to take the two empty seats (although Hideki Noda was also considered), both drivers bringing a small amount of personal backing. Frenchman Franck Lagorce was also signed as a test driver. Pacific had folded during the off-season, and it was clear that Forti would be some way behind the rest of the field in the slow FG01B. Badoer and Montermini failed to make the new 107 per cent cut in qualifying for the Australian Grand Prix and thus did not start the race, but both then managed to qualify for the Grands Prix held in Brazil and Argentina, scoring a 10th- and an 11th-place finish between them in the races. Badoer, however, attracted attention in Argentina for a different reason. As Diniz attempted to lap him, the two collided and Badoer's car flipped over; the Italian escaping injury. Both cars then failed to qualify at the Nürburgring.

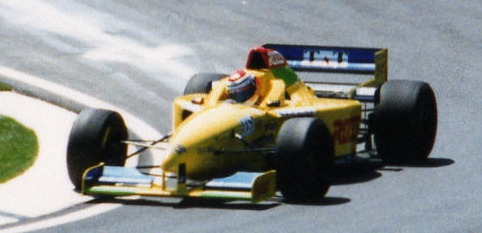
Andrea Montermini driving the FG01B in its final race, the 1996 San Marino Grand Prix.

Forti produced a new chassis, the FG03, for the next race of the season in Imola. It had been designed by the same personnel as the previous year, with further work carried out by George Ryton after the latter moved to the team from Ferrari and took up the post of Technical Director mid-season. Both drivers judged it a significant improvement over the old car, with increased aerodynamic downforce and directional sensitivity, but there was only one FG03 available, and Montermini failed to qualify in the old car. Badoer, however, qualified last, but comfortably within the 107 per cent cut-off, and only 0.7s behind Ricardo Rosset in the Footwork. Badoer finished 10th and last, but had suffered reliability problems in the new car and was two laps behind Pedro Lamy's Minardi. Both drivers qualified in Monaco, but Montermini crashed in the wet warm-up session and did not start the race, whilst Badoer struggled in the slippery conditions and took out Jacques Villeneuve as he was being lapped by the Williams. He was fined $5000 and received a two-race suspended ban.

=== Deal with Shannon Racing ===
A new livery (based on the Italian flag) signalled a major sponsorship deal with Shannon, but did nothing to save the team from its collapse mid-season. This is Luca Badoer driving the FG03 at the 1996 Canadian Grand Prix.

An illustration of the FG03's "Shannon" livery.

After the Monaco GP, there were rumours that Forti would not survive the season without some form of takeover. In the period before the next race, the Spanish GP, Belco Avia boss Arron Colombo announced that a deal had been reached between Guido Forti and an entity known as Shannon Racing for the latter to buy a 51 per cent share of the team. The deal was concluded later in the month, on June 30. Shannon Racing and its parent company FinFirst were Irish-registered sections of a Milanese financial group, and had already established teams in various Formula Three championships and in International Formula 3000 in 1996. The group was keen to move into Formula One, and Forti provided an opportunity for this to happen. It was believed that Colombo had organised the deal, which was scheduled to continue throughout 1996 with an option for 1997, because Belco Avia was owed money by Forti. As part of the management change, Cesare Fiorio left the team to join Ligier and was replaced by Daniele Coronna, whilst designer George Ryton joined from Ferrari.

For the Spanish GP, the cars therefore appeared in a new green-white-red livery (based on the Italian flag), apparently confirming Shannon Racing's acquisition of 51 per cent of Forti. This financial boost appeared to ensure the team's survival. With the off-track confusion, both drivers again failed to qualify. Nevertheless, at the Canadian and French Grands Prix, both Fortis made it to the grid, Badoer even outqualifying Rosset in Montréal. However, Forti had lost its good 1995 reliability record, as these starts only resulted in four retirements. By this time, Forti's financial problems, caused by a conflict of team ownership between Guido Forti and Shannon Racing, were becoming increasingly urgent in nature. Both cars retired with "engine problems" at the French GP, although it was widely rumoured that this was due to the team running out of engine mileage as it went into debt with engine suppliers Cosworth.

=== Bankruptcy and withdrawal ===
Guido Forti alleged that Shannon Racing had not paid him any money within the stipulated six-day deadline after the deal was concluded and refuted the claim that it now owned 51 per cent of his team. As the team ran out of money, it was doubtful whether it would turn up at the British GP. In the end, Forti took part, only for the cars to complete a mere handful of laps each in practice and thus failing to set a time quick enough to qualify. This was because it was becoming increasingly in debt to Cosworth and was running out of engine mileage for its cars, only having enough to make a token effort at participation. The team made it to the next race – the German GP – but both cars remained unassembled in the pit garages throughout the weekend after the engine supply was finally cut off.

Guido Forti, after discussing the matter with commercial rights-owner Bernie Ecclestone, had decided to withdraw the team from the German GP as negotiations over the team's ownership between himself and Shannon continued, despite the threat of the FIA (F1's governing body) imposing a fine on the outfit for missing the race. Following the failure of these negotiations, he then announced that Shannon's deal had fallen through and that he was back in charge of the team. He hoped to finalise some more sponsorship deals which would allow Forti to compete in the Hungarian GP. Shannon responded by claiming it still owned 51 per cent of the team, and that it intended to solve Forti's financial problems itself, in addition to replacing Guido Forti as Team Principal. He duly took the company to court over the matter, an arduous process in the Italian legal system.

With the team in limbo whilst the ownership dispute was judged, Forti's situation was bleak. The team faced the prospect of further heavy FIA-imposed fines for missing races if the situation did not improve, or even exclusion from the championship for bringing the sport into disrepute, as had happened to the Andrea Moda team in 1992. Forti withdrew his team from the sport; it did not make an appearance at the Hungarian GP, the Belgian GP, nor at any further point in the championship. Badoer and Montermini were left without drives, and the promising FG03 chassis would no longer race. By the time Shannon Racing won the court case in September, Forti had ceased to exist. Shannon Racing's teams in the lower motorsport categories also closed down. Coincidentally, Guido Forti had signed the 1997 Concorde Agreement shortly before his team's demise, which could have given his team a chance of surviving if it had made it into that year due to the extra television revenue that was duly granted to each of the teams under the terms of the agreement.

== Legacy ==
Forti's withdrawal marked not only the end of its participation in Formula One, but also terminated a team which had enjoyed success in International Formula 3000 and other minor categories. It is generally agreed that Forti may have succeeded if it had its 1995 budget and the FG03 car at the same time, and that Diniz's departure meant that it stood little chance of survival, but the team has become another example of a small, backmarking team unable to finance its aspirations. One of the final "privateer" teams to enter the sport in an era of increasing influence and participation from the large car manufacturers, Forti is often cited along with Pacific and Simtek as prime examples of this tendency. It was also argued that the increasing amount of money involved in financing an F1 team which was forcing many of the smaller teams to withdraw in the early to mid-1990s was a long-term threat to the future of the sport. Alternatively, some saw Forti and similar tail-enders as undeserving of a place in F1, and it has been suggested that the imposition of the 107 per cent rule by the FIA in 1996 was a move to force them to raise their game or leave the sport altogether.

However, the Forti F1 cars have since been used for other purposes. Examples of the FG03 have been used as part of F1-themed track days in the United Kingdom at motor racing circuits such as Rockingham.

== Racing record ==
=== Championships and notable race wins ===
Year	Championship/Race	Chassis	Engine	Driver	Reference(s)
1977	Italian Formula Ford 2000 Drivers' Championship	Osella	Ford	(Italy) Teo Fabi	
1979	Argentine Formula Three Drivers' Championship	Martini	Toyota	(Argentina) Oscar Larrauri	
1985	Italian Formula Three Drivers' Championship	Dallara	Alfa Romeo	(Switzerland) Franco Forini	
1987	Italian Formula Three Drivers' Championship	Dallara	Alfa Romeo	(Italy) Enrico Bertaggia	
1988	Italian Formula Three Drivers' Championship	Dallara	Alfa Romeo	(Italy) Emanuele Naspetti	
1988	Macau Grand Prix	Dallara	Alfa Romeo	(Italy) Enrico Bertaggia	
1988	Grand Prix de Monaco F3	Dallara	Alfa Romeo	(Italy) Enrico Bertaggia	
1989	Italian Formula Three Drivers' Championship	Dallara	Alfa Romeo	(Italy) Gianni Morbidelli	
1989	European Formula Three Cup	Dallara	Alfa Romeo	(Italy) Gianni Morbidelli	

=== Complete International Formula 3000 results ===
(key) (results in bold indicate pole position; results in italics indicate fastest lap)

Year	Chassis	Engine	Tyres	Driver(s)	1	2	3	4	5	6	7	8	9	10	11	Points	TC
1987	Dallara 3087	Cosworth V8	A		SIL	VAL	SPA	PAU	DON	PER	BRH	BIR	IML	BUG	JAR	0	NC
1987	Dallara 3087	Cosworth V8	A	(Italy) Nicola Larini						Ret	16		Ret		Ret	0	NC
1987	Dallara 3087	Cosworth V8	A	(Italy) Nicola Tesini								DNQ				0	NC
1988	Dallara 3087; Lola T88/50	Cosworth V8	A		JER	VAL	PAU	SIL	MNZ	PER	BRH	BIR	BUG	ZOL	DIJ	0	NC
1988	Dallara 3087; Lola T88/50	Cosworth V8	A	(Italy) Enrico Bertaggia	DNQ	DNQ	DNQ	DNQ	7	16	DNS	DNQ	DNQ	11	Ret	0	NC
1988	Dallara 3087; Lola T88/50	Cosworth V8	A	(Argentina) Fernando Croceri	DNQ	DNQ	DNQ	DNQ	DNQ							0	NC
1988	Dallara 3087; Lola T88/50	Cosworth V8	A	(Italy) Enrico Debenedetti										DNQ	DNQ	0	NC
1988	Dallara 3087; Lola T88/50	Cosworth V8	A	(Italy) Nino Fama						DNQ						0	NC
1989	Lola T89/50	Cosworth V8	A		SIL	VAL	PAU	JER	PER	BRH	BIR	SPA	BUG	DIJ		7	9th
1989	Lola T89/50	Cosworth V8	A	(Italy) Claudio Langes	12	Ret	Ret	7	2	6	9	15	9	7		7	9th
1990	Lola T90/50	Cosworth V8	A		DON	SIL	PAU	JER	MNZ	PER	HOC	BRH	BIR	BUG	NOG	20	7th
1990	Lola T90/50	Cosworth V8	A	(Italy) Gianni Morbidelli	8	Ret	3	Ret	4	1	Ret	Ret	Ret	7	**3**	20	7th
1991	Lola T91/50; Reynard 91D	Cosworth V8	A		VAL	PAU	JER	MUG	PER	HOC	BRH	SPA	BUG	NOG		43	3rd
1991	Lola T91/50; Reynard 91D	Cosworth V8	A	(Italy) Emanuele Naspetti	10	9	DNQ	DNS	**1**	1	1	1	Ret	6		43	3rd
1991	Lola T91/50; Reynard 91D	Cosworth V8	A	(Italy) Fabrizio Giovanardi	12	5	DNQ	8	Ret	13	8	6	DNS	4		43	3rd
1992	Reynard 92D	Cosworth V8	A		SIL	PAU	CAT	PER	HOC	NUR	SPA	ALB	NOG	MAG		44	2nd
1992	Reynard 92D	Cosworth V8	A	(Italy) Emanuele Naspetti	6	1	16	2	4	**Ret**						44	2nd
1992	Reynard 92D	Cosworth V8	A	(Italy) Andrea Montermini							**1**	1	4	Ret		44	2nd
1992	Reynard 92D	Cosworth V8	A	(Italy) Alessandro Zampedri	Ret	Ret	11	5	7	Ret	7	8	5	Ret		44	2nd
1993	Reynard 93D	Cosworth V8	A		DON	SIL	PAU	PER	HOC	NUR	SPA	MAG	NOG			20	5th
1993	Reynard 93D	Cosworth V8	A	(Monaco) Olivier Beretta	**1**	10	4	Ret	4	5	13	9	4			20	5th
1993	Reynard 93D	Cosworth V8	A	(Brazil) Pedro Diniz	Ret	Ret	DNQ	7	Ret	16	14	11	14			20	5th
1994	Reynard 94D	Cosworth V8	A		SIL	PAU	CAT	PER	HOC	SPA	EST	MAG				9	7th
1994	Reynard 94D	Cosworth V8	A	(Brazil) Pedro Diniz	Ret	Ret	10	Ret	Ret	9	4	Ret				9	7th
1994	Reynard 94D	Cosworth V8	A	(Japan) Hideki Noda	5	Ret	Ret	3	Ret	7	16	11				9	7th

=== Complete Formula One results ===
(key) (results in bold indicate pole position; results in italics indicate fastest lap)

Year	Chassis	Engine	Tyres	Drivers	1	2	3	4	5	6	7	8	9	10	11	12	13	14	15	16	17	Points	WCC
1995	FG01	Ford EDD 3.0 V8	G		BRA	ARG	SMR	ESP	MON	CAN	FRA	GBR	GER	HUN	BEL	ITA	POR	EUR	PAC	JPN	AUS	0	NC
1995	FG01	Ford EDD 3.0 V8	G	(Brazil) Pedro Diniz	10	NC	NC	Ret	10	Ret	Ret	Ret	Ret	Ret	13	9	16	13	17	Ret	7	0	NC
1995	FG01	Ford EDD 3.0 V8	G	(Brazil) Roberto Moreno	Ret	NC	NC	Ret	Ret	Ret	16	Ret	Ret	Ret	14	DNS	17	Ret	16	Ret	Ret	0	NC
1996	FG01B; FG03	Ford ECA Zetec-R 3.0 V8	G		AUS	BRA	ARG	EUR	SMR	MON	ESP	CAN	FRA	GBR	GER	HUN	BEL	ITA	POR	JPN		0	NC
1996	FG01B; FG03	Ford ECA Zetec-R 3.0 V8	G	(Italy) Luca Badoer	DNQ	11	Ret	DNQ	10	Ret	DNQ	Ret	Ret	DNQ	DNP							0	NC
1996	FG01B; FG03	Ford ECA Zetec-R 3.0 V8	G	(Italy) Andrea Montermini	DNQ	Ret	10	DNQ	DNQ	DNS	DNQ	Ret	Ret	DNQ	DNP							0	NC

== See also ==
- Pacific Racing
- Simtek
