= Giorgio Stirano =

Italian racing car engineer

Giorgio Stirano (born 23 February 1950 in Turin) is an Italian racing car engineer, who worked for Forti and Osella in Formula One.

== Early career ==
During his university years Stirano was a rally co-driver and used to contribute to the motor sports pages of the daily newspaper Tuttosport. In January 1976, after graduating in aeronautical engineering in 1975 at the Politecnico di Torino, he was hired by Osella Race Team as sports director and then went on to take on the role as team manager and project manager. At the time Osella raced in Formula 2, a category which they had entered into for the first time during the 1974 season after a period of minor successes in Italian sports car races and hillclimbing.

When the young Stirano started working at Osella, he was given the assignment of managing all the projects relating to the sport competitions, including Formula Super Ford, Formula 3, Formula 2 and sport. In the winter of 1978, Stirano designed an evolution of the old Osella FA2 for the 1979 season: this new car allowed Eddie Cheever to win races at Silverstone, the Pau Grand Prix and Zandvoort. Cheever's victories and the car's good performances convinced Enzo Osella to invest in the team and to move up to Formula 1.

== Formula 1 ==
For the 1980 season, Stirano support the early design of the race car, the Osella FA1, managed by Nicola Materazzi, and when in October 1979 Materazzi left the team for Ferrari, Stirano became the chief engineer. Cheever was announced driver of the FA1 which had its debut at the Argentine Grand Prix. The FA1 did not achieve good results, only a 12th place at the Italian Grand Prix at Imola, collecting 9 retirements and 4 failures to qualify. To compensate for the initial flaws, a second version of the car, the FA1B, was designed and built in collaboration with Giorgio Valentini. Stirano, together with Valentini designed the 1981 car, the FA1C, which was entrusted this time to two private drivers, Beppe Gabbiani and Miguel Ángel Guerra. The inexperience of the two drivers brought about very poor results that season. (Guerra failed to qualify at almost all the races and was involved in a serious accident). Despite the change of designers and the withdrawal of Stirano around the middle of 1981, the team never achieved good results, to the point of disappearing altogether in 1990.

== Designing ==
Meanwhile, Stirano went on to dedicate his time to activities parallel to the world of motor racing: together with three partners he founded Alba Engineering and started building a car for Formula 3, test driven by Enzo Coloni. In 1982 Alba designed a car to race in the new C Group championship for the Carma of Martino Finotto and Carlo Facetti. The car, which was fitted with a turbocharged four-cylinder engine participated in the FIA World Championship and won the FIA Cup for C Junior cars in 1983 and in 1984. These "custom" cars were also exported to the United States where they participated in the IMSA Championship with drivers such as Gianpiero Moretti, Jim Trueman and others at the wheel.

== Engineering ==
Stirano returned to the world of Formula 1 in 1984, as a consultant for Alfa Romeo, and in the years to follow he participated in the design and planning of the one-make training racing car the CSAI Alfa Boxer. In 1986 he founded PTI Alba Tech, an engineering company specializing in the planning and building of special competitive cars, and by doing so was able to expand the boundaries of the service provided to the mechanics of chassis and suspension of prototypes. Stirano, along with Giugiaro and his Italdesign, collaborated in the designing of the Machimoto, a concept-car which was presented at the Salone dell'automobile di Torino. He also participated in the designing and planning of Giugiaro's Nazca and Blitz (an electric racing car, designed by Bertone and ZER and holder of the 300 km/h (190 mph) speed record for electric cars), and of Pininfarina's Ethos (a 1992 prototype for an environmental friendly car). In 1993 he collaborated with Alfa Corse to design the Alfa 155 TS, which took part in the Italian Superturismo Championship with the drivers Gabriele Tarquini, Gianni Morbidelli and Tamara Vidali, meanwhile he was also involved with the Alfa Romeo team as Leading Engineer. In 1994 Tarquini won the British Touring Car Championship with the Alfa 155 TS.

== The return to Formula 1 ==
After the accident that cost Ayrton Senna his life during a race in 1994, Stirano was appointed by Williams as expert surveyor on the side of the Williams team, which was being accused of causing the accident due to them having created an undersized steering column. The enquiry, which started in 1997, had Stirano, Diego Milen, Roberto Vitali and Giovanni Saccenti (the surveyors team for Williams) up against Tommaso Carletti and Mauro Forghieri. On officially returning to Formula 1 in 1995, Stirano, during his short adventure in this affluent championship, was first appointed as sports director and then as team manager of Forti Corse: the team lined up drivers such as Pedro Paulo Diniz and Roberto Moreno. It was here that he developed the FG01 vehicle, originally designed by Sergio Rinland, which gained seventh place at the Australian Grand Prix driven by Diniz. This was Stirano's last race in a Formula 1 pit box. That following winter together with the help of Chris Radage, Stirano designed the Forti FG03, a much more modern and lighter vehicle, which competed in the 1996 season. In 1999 he worked together with the members of Euroteam in the STW championship with Stefano Modena's Alfa Romeo 156. From 2002 to 2005 Stirano was the consultant of the race team Opel Euroteam (OPC Opel DTM team), managing the races of the Opel Astra of Jeroen Bleekemolen and Laurent Aiello. In the same period he was also providing technical assistance with the creation of Gloria, a company founded by Enrico Glorioso and specializing in the building of racing cars for Junior Championships. In 2006 Stirano founded the company, Albatech Monaco, an atelier of design and engineering providing consultancy in the automotive and nautical fields. Stirano was for a long time a member of ACI CSAI, the Italian racing cars Federation, in the Technical Subcommittee and, as Italian Deputy Member, in the FIA Technical Commission, President of the Motorsport Safety Council until 2006, and Advisor SAE (Society of Automotive Engineers) for Italy from 1993 to 2000. He is currently involved as commentator and news analyst for television programs regarding the world of racing. Since 2001 he has been co-author for the Formula 1 yearbook published by Vallardi Editore. In 2003, together with Michael Ling, he edited the yearbook Formula 1 Championship 2003 Yearbook: The Complete Record of the Grand Prix Season. In 2006 together with Paolo D'Alessio and Mirco Lazzari, he published Formula 1 - La cronaca e le foto più belle del campionato, editing the technical part of the book. In 2007 Stirano and Paolo D'Alessio published the book Red Passion which speaks about the 60-year history of Ferrari races and in 2008 he and Paolo D’Alessio published the book Gran Prix which is about the 'modern' Formula 1.
