= Carlo Gancia =

Carlo Gancia may refer to:

- Carlo Gancia (wine), founder of the Gancia wine-producing company
- Carlo Vallarino Gancia, former co-owner of the Forti Formula One team
