= Carlo Vallarino Gancia =

Italo-Brazilian businessman

Carlo Vallarino Gancia is an Italo-Brazilian businessman.

== Biography ==
=== Early life ===
The Gancia family is famous as the owners of an Italian wine-producing company (Carlo is named after the founder of the dynasty in 1850, called Carlo Gancia). Carlo is the eldest of the 5th generation of Gancias. Carlo Vallarino was born in Canelli, Province of Asti, Italy, the son of Piero and Lulla Gancia Vallarino, with siblings Barbara Gancia Vallarino and Kika Rivetti.

His father, Piero Gancia Vallarino, was an amateur racing driver, who in 1966 was the first Brazilian Motor Racing Champion, driving an alfa Romeo Giulia Ti Super, he was among the founders of the Confederação Brasileira de Automobilismo, the national motorsport authority of Brazil. Piero was also the Owner of Team Jolly Gancia, who raced Alfa Romeos in Brazil. For Jolly Gancia drove Emilio Zambello (Piero's business partner), Carlos Pace, Emerson Fittipaldi, Wilson Fittipaldi, Ciro Cayres, Ubaldo C. Lolli, Marivaldo Fernandes, Totó Porto, Chico Lameirão, Celso Lara Barberis, among others. Jolly Gancia chief mechanic was Giuseppe Perego, a Milanese who had worked for Isotta Fraschini and Maserati, under Guerino Bertocchi. Perego's right-hand man was Spaniard Manolo Pazos Torres. Jolly Automóveis was founded in 1966 and became the importer for Brazil of Alfa Romeo and then of Lamborghini and in 1970 of Ferrari.

After growing up in Brazil, Carlo studied in Switzerland, UK and in San Diego, California where he obtained an MBA. He went on to work in several businesses in Saudi Arabia in construction, in Brazil in car dealerships and banking, in Switzerland and Luxembourg in banking and in Monaco in financial services.

=== Motorsport ===
Gancia was involved in motorsport from an early age, helping Brazilians get into Formula One, drivers such as Emerson Fittipaldi, Carlos Pace and Nelson Piquet to obtain sponsorship. He also ran a go-kart factory which helped to start Ayrton Senna's racing career. In addition, Gancia himself also raced at a competitive level, in a series of Brazilian Touring car racing championships.

By 1992, Gancia was assisting Pedro Diniz's racing career, and met Italian Formula 3000 team owner Guido Forti. The two made a deal whereby Diniz drove for the Forti team in F3000 in 1993 and 1994, and Gancia bought the shares of Guido Forti's original business partner, Paolo Guerci, thus taking over the role of fundraising.

Forti moved up to F1 in 1995 with Diniz as one of the team's drivers. Although Gancia had helped to secure a good budget, the FG01 chassis was slow and unsuccessful. When Diniz broke his original three-year contract with the team by moving to Ligier for 1996, much of the sponsorship disappeared and Gancia looked towards Indy Car racing as an alternative.

When the Shannon Racing Team company arrived mid-season as a potential major sponsor, Gancia sold his shares and left the team. A few months later, an ownership dispute between Shannon and Guido Forti led to the team's collapse and withdrawal from F1.

Gancia currently is the president of for Image Sports Marketing, a US-based company with subsidiaries in São Paulo which represents, promotes, markets and televises American open-wheel racing formulae such as the IndyCar Series in Brazil.
