= Paolo Guerci =

Italian engineer

Paolo Guerci is an Italian engineer who has spent his career in auto racing.

== Career ==
Guerci joined forces with retired racing driver Guido Forti to form the Forti racing team in 1972. He remained with the team throughout its rise through Formula Three and Formula 3000, and eventually its unsuccessful foray into Formula One in 1995 and 1996. In 1994, Guido Forti found a new business partner in Carlo Gancia, who bought Guerci's shares in the team and set about raising the budget needed for Formula One with help from the family of driver Pedro Diniz. Guerci stayed on as a race engineer for the team during its time in F1.

Following his spell with Forti, Guerci became a principal member of the technical staff of Italian Formula Three Championship Passoli Racing, alongside former Ferrari and Brabham chief mechanic Ermanno Cuoghi. Guerci left the team after Cesare Passoli's death in 2008. He then worked as Technical Director for the Italian International Formula Master team Alan Racing. He also collaborated with the racing team RP Motorsport in Piacenza.

His son, Davide Guerci, followed the steps of his father and worked for the Formula Three team Down Force and the Formula Renault team GSK Motorsport.
