= George Ryton =

British engineer (born 1948)

- Born: George Harold Ryron; 15 August 1948 (age 77); Singapore
- Occupation: Formula One engineer

George Harold Ryton (born 15 August 1948 in Singapore) is a British engineer best known for his involvement in Formula One auto racing.

== Career ==
Ryton entered the world of F1 when he was hired to work in the Haas Lola team's drawing office for 1985. When the team was disbanded, he moved to Reynard to help design the company's first Formula 3000 chassis. Soon afterwards, he moved to the design centre of John Barnard, who was Ferrari's Technical Director at the time.

At the end of 1988, Ryton was offered the position of Technical Director of the new EuroBrun team, which was never competitive and withdrew from F1 before the end of the 1990 season. Ryton then moved to become Chief Designer at Tyrrell under Harvey Postlethwaite from 1991 to 1993, when he was dropped after the team lost its sponsorship deals.

Ryton returned to work for Barnard, who had briefly moved to work for Benetton but was now back at Ferrari. On this occasion, Ryton's job was slightly different, as he was put in charge of the team's drawing office at its Maranello base. He remained in this position until mid-1996, when he accepted the position of Technical Director at the small Forti team.

After working on the FG03 chassis, Ryton was left without a job when the team folded mid-season. However, he was soon appointed Head of Research and Development at the Ligier team, which was bought by former F1 champion Alain Prost soon afterwards and took his name. In 1998, the Prost AP01's unreliable and heavy gearbox saw him fall from favour and he moved to Minardi.

Ryton stayed at Minardi until the season-ending Japanese Grand Prix in 2003, firstly as Chief Designer but latterly as a design consultant.

Having left F1, Ryton now works as an independent consultant in Cornwall.
