= Guido Forti =

Founder and team manager of Formula One team Forti

- Born: 10 July 1940; Castelnuovo Scrivia, Italy
- Died: January 11, 2013 (aged 72); Alessandria, Italy
- Occupations: Formula One and F3000 Team Owner
- Years active: 1987-2003
- Known for: Forti

Guido Forti (10 July 1940 – 11 January 2013) was the founder and team manager of the now-defunct Formula One team Forti.

Forti co-founded his "Forti Corse" racing team with businessman Paolo Guerci in the late 1970s, initially running in Italian and European Formula Three. The team made the step up to Formula 3000 in 1987, but only participated in half of the races. For his debut season in the formulae, Forti had Nicola Larini and Nicola Tesini driving his cars, supplied by fellow newcomers Dallara. The team's first of nine wins in Formula 3000 came in 1990, with Gianni Morbidelli driving. Forti opted at the start of the 1994 season that it would be the last for his team in the category, as he had engineered a move into Formula One organised by Carlo Gancia with the financial support of wealthy Brazilian driver Pedro Diniz. Forti continued with the team throughout its short stint in F1 from 1995 to 1996. However, in the middle of the 1996 Formula One season, the team were struggling to secure funding due to Diniz's departure to the Ligier team at the start of the year. As a result, a financial deal was struck with the Shannon Group, which announced that it now owned 51% of the team. However, as Forti's financial situation worsened further despite the deal, Guido took Shannon to court to try to get back the 51% of the team he had lost. After an initial loss to Shannon in a court case, Forti managed to regain control of his team, but at this stage the outfit had already missed several Grands Prix and did not return to the sport.

Forti was last involved in motor racing in 2003, when he was employed by a Euro Formula 3000 team. He died in January 2013, at the age of 72, in his home city of Alessandria.
