= 1996 Argentine Grand Prix =

Race 3 of 16 in the 1996 Formula One World Championship
← Previous race	Next race →

Race details
- Date: 7 April 1996
- Location: Autódromo Oscar Alfredo Gálvez, Buenos Aires, Argentina
- Course: Permanent race track
- Course length: 4.259 km (2.657 miles)
- Distance: 72 laps, 306.648 km (191.296 miles)
- Weather: Dry with temperatures reaching up to 21 °C (70 °F)

Pole position
Driver	(United Kingdom) Damon Hill	Williams-Renault
- Time: 1:30.346

Fastest lap
Driver	(France) Jean Alesi	Benetton-Renault
- Time: 1:29.413 on lap 66

Podium
First	(United Kingdom) Damon Hill	Williams-Renault
Second	(Canada) Jacques Villeneuve	Williams-Renault
Third	(France) Jean Alesi	Benetton-Renault

The 1996 Argentine Grand Prix was a Formula One motor race held on 7 April 1996 at Autódromo Oscar Alfredo Gálvez, Buenos Aires. Despite suffering a bout of food poisoning, Damon Hill made it three wins out of three, with Jacques Villeneuve helping Williams complete their second one-two of the season. Jos Verstappen scored his only point of the season, Andrea Montermini his only finish of the season. This was the first race of 1996 where no drivers failed to meet the 107% time.

Pedro Diniz was involved in two major incidents during the race. First he collided with Luca Badoer, whose Forti was flipped and landed upside down in the gravel, forcing the marshals to bring out the safety car. Trackside marshals were heavily criticized for their delay in aiding Badoer's escape from the car; ultimately the Italian was forced to crawl out from underneath the Forti (the explanation for which was later given by the marshals that an uncharacteristic delay in the safety car picking up the race leader had caused confusion on the trackside). Diniz managed to continue and made a pit stop as the safety car was preparing to pull in - only to retire when he came back onto the circuit and his Ligier burst into flames, because a safety-valve in the fuel tank had jammed open, with the safety car staying out for three extra laps as a result.

== Classification ==
=== Qualifying ===
Pos	No	Driver	Constructor	Time	Gap
1	5	(United Kingdom) Damon Hill	Williams-Renault	1:30.346	
2	1	(Germany) Michael Schumacher	Ferrari	1:30.598	+0.252
3	6	(Canada) Jacques Villeneuve	Williams-Renault	1:30.907	+0.561
4	3	(France) Jean Alesi	Benetton-Renault	1:31.038	+0.692
5	4	(Austria) Gerhard Berger	Benetton-Renault	1:31.262	+0.916
6	11	(Brazil) Rubens Barrichello	Jordan-Peugeot	1:31.404	+1.058
7	17	(Netherlands) Jos Verstappen	Footwork-Hart	1:31.615	+1.269
8	7	(Finland) Mika Häkkinen	McLaren-Mercedes	1:31.801	+1.455
9	8	(United Kingdom) David Coulthard	McLaren-Mercedes	1:32.001	+1.655
10	2	(United Kingdom) Eddie Irvine	Ferrari	1:32.058	+1.712
11	15	(Germany) Heinz-Harald Frentzen	Sauber-Ford	1:32.130	+1.784
12	9	(France) Olivier Panis	Ligier-Mugen-Honda	1:32.177	+1.831
13	18	(Japan) Ukyo Katayama	Tyrrell-Yamaha	1:32.407	+2.061
14	21	(Brazil) Tarso Marques	Minardi-Ford	1:32.502	+2.156
15	12	(United Kingdom) Martin Brundle	Jordan-Peugeot	1:32.696	+2.350
16	19	(Finland) Mika Salo	Tyrrell-Yamaha	1:32.903	+2.557
17	14	(United Kingdom) Johnny Herbert	Sauber-Ford	1:33.256	+2.910
18	10	(Brazil) Pedro Diniz	Ligier-Mugen-Honda	1:33.424	+3.078
19	20	(Portugal) Pedro Lamy	Minardi-Ford	1:33.727	+3.381
20	16	(Brazil) Ricardo Rosset	Footwork-Hart	1:33.752	+3.406
21	22	(Italy) Luca Badoer	Forti-Ford	1:34.830	+4.484
22	23	(Italy) Andrea Montermini	Forti-Ford	1:35.651	+5.305
107% time: 1:36.670

=== Race ===
Pos	No	Driver	Constructor	Laps	Time/Retired	Grid	Points
1	5	(United Kingdom) Damon Hill	Williams-Renault	72	1:54:55.322	1	10
2	6	(Canada) Jacques Villeneuve	Williams-Renault	72	+12.167	3	6
3	3	(France) Jean Alesi	Benetton-Renault	72	+14.754	4	4
4	11	(Brazil) Rubens Barrichello	Jordan-Peugeot	72	+55.131	6	3
5	2	(United Kingdom) Eddie Irvine	Ferrari	72	+1:04.991	10	2
6	17	(Netherlands) Jos Verstappen	Footwork-Hart	72	+1:08.913	7	1
7	8	(United Kingdom) David Coulthard	McLaren-Mercedes	72	+1:13.400	9	
8	9	(France) Olivier Panis	Ligier-Mugen-Honda	72	+1:14.295	12	
9	14	(United Kingdom) Johnny Herbert	Sauber-Ford	71	+1 Lap	17	
10	23	(Italy) Andrea Montermini	Forti-Ford	69	+3 Laps	22	
Ret	4	(Austria) Gerhard Berger	Benetton-Renault	56	Suspension	5	
Ret	1	(Germany) Michael Schumacher	Ferrari	46	Broken wing	2	
Ret	20	(Portugal) Pedro Lamy	Minardi-Ford	39	Transmission	19	
Ret	19	(Finland) Mika Salo	Tyrrell-Yamaha	36	Throttle	16	
Ret	12	(United Kingdom) Martin Brundle	Jordan-Peugeot	34	Collision	15	
Ret	21	(Brazil) Tarso Marques	Minardi-Ford	33	Collision	14	
Ret	15	(Germany) Heinz-Harald Frentzen	Sauber-Ford	32	Spun off	11	
Ret	10	(Brazil) Pedro Diniz	Ligier-Mugen-Honda	29	Fire	18	
Ret	18	(Japan) Ukyo Katayama	Tyrrell-Yamaha	28	Differential	13	
Ret	16	(Brazil) Ricardo Rosset	Footwork-Hart	24	Oil pump	20	
Ret	22	(Italy) Luca Badoer	Forti-Ford	24	Collision	21	
Ret	7	(Finland) Mika Häkkinen	McLaren-Mercedes	19	Throttle	8	

== Championship standings after the race ==
Drivers' Championship standings

Pos	Driver	Points
1	(United Kingdom) Damon Hill	30
2	(Canada) Jacques Villeneuve	12
3	(France) Jean Alesi	10
4	(United Kingdom) Eddie Irvine	6
5	(Finland) Mika Häkkinen	5

Constructors' Championship standings

Pos	Constructor	Points
1	(United Kingdom) Williams-Renault	42
2	(Italy) Benetton-Renault	13
3	(Italy) Ferrari	10
4	(United Kingdom) McLaren-Mercedes	5
5	(Republic of Ireland) Jordan-Peugeot	3

- Note: Only the top five positions are included for both sets of standings.

Previous race: 1996 Brazilian Grand Prix	FIA Formula One World Championship; 1996 season	Next race: 1996 European Grand Prix
Previous race: 1995 Argentine Grand Prix	Argentine Grand Prix	Next race: 1997 Argentine Grand Prix
