= 1996 Spanish Grand Prix =

Race 7 of 16 in the 1996 Formula One World Championship
← Previous race	Next race →

Race details
- Date: 2 June 1996
- Official name: Gran Premio Marlboro de España
- Location: Circuit de Catalunya, Montmeló, Catalonia, Spain
- Course: Permanent racing facility
- Course length: 4.727 km (2.937 miles)
- Distance: 65 laps, 307.114 km (190.832 miles)
- Weather: Rain
- Attendance: 55,000

Pole position
Driver	(United Kingdom) Damon Hill	Williams-Renault
- Time: 1:20.650

Fastest lap
Driver	(Germany) Michael Schumacher	Ferrari
- Time: 1:45.517 on lap 14

Podium
First	(Germany) Michael Schumacher	Ferrari
Second	(France) Jean Alesi	Benetton-Renault
Third	(Canada) Jacques Villeneuve	Williams-Renault

The 1996 Spanish Grand Prix was a Formula One motor race held at the Circuit de Catalunya on 2 June 1996. It was the seventh race of the 1996 Formula One World Championship.

This race, Michael Schumacher's first Ferrari victory, is generally regarded as one of his finest. In the torrential rain, he produced a stunning drive, and is a prime example of why he earned the nickname "Regenmeister" ("Rainmaster"), despite his early and unforced crash at a wet Monaco Grand Prix two weeks earlier. The race was also Schumacher's 20th career win.

== Race report ==
At the start, Schumacher lost several positions due to a clutch problem, which indirectly resulted in several clashes in the main straight involving 5 cars. Giancarlo Fisichella emerged from the carnage with a blown left front and a missing rear wing, while Olivier Panis escaped with suspension damage. Both pulled into the pits and retired a lap later.

Mika Salo was disqualified for the second time this season, for changing cars after the field was under starter's orders.

Damon Hill had started the race from pole position, but dropped to 8th after spinning twice in the opening laps, before another spin into the pit wall on lap 12 ended his race. Schumacher recovered from a poor start to take the lead from Villeneuve on lap 13, and from then on he dominated the race, lapping over three seconds a lap faster than the remainder of the field.

Rubens Barrichello was running a competitive race, getting as high as 2nd place after Jacques Villeneuve and Alesi made their pit stops. After his own scheduled (lengthy) pitstop he was sent back to the race but forced to retire from third place with 20 laps to go after a clutch problem caused his engine to fade out. On the previous lap, Gerhard Berger had spun his Benetton out of fourth place while trying to lap the Ligier of Pedro Diniz. Alesi and Villeneuve switched places on their own pitstops, Alesi taking his only one some 6 laps before Villeneuve.

After an uneventful race on his part, Heinz-Harald Frentzen finished in fourth, while Mika Häkkinen took fifth after surviving a spin off the track in the closing stages of the race. Jos Verstappen, running fifth after the retirements of Barrichello and Berger, crashed into the tyre barrier with 12 laps left, guaranteeing Diniz his first Formula One point as by this time only six drivers were left in the race. With no further retirements, Diniz brought his car home in sixth, after driving at a more cautious pace that saw him fall two laps adrift of the front runners by the end.

== Classification ==
=== Qualifying ===
Pos	No	Driver	Constructor	Time	Gap
1	5	(United Kingdom) Damon Hill	Williams-Renault	1:20.650	
2	6	(Canada) Jacques Villeneuve	Williams-Renault	1:21.084	+0.434
3	1	(Germany) Michael Schumacher	Ferrari	1:21.587	+0.937
4	3	(France) Jean Alesi	Benetton-Renault	1:22.061	+1.411
5	4	(Austria) Gerhard Berger	Benetton-Renault	1:22.125	+1.475
6	2	(United Kingdom) Eddie Irvine	Ferrari	1:22.333	+1.683
7	11	(Brazil) Rubens Barrichello	Jordan-Peugeot	1:22.379	+1.729
8	9	(France) Olivier Panis	Ligier-Mugen-Honda	1:22.685	+2.035
9	14	(United Kingdom) Johnny Herbert	Sauber-Ford	1:23.027	+2.377
10	7	(Finland) Mika Häkkinen	McLaren-Mercedes	1:23.070	+2.420
11	15	(Germany) Heinz-Harald Frentzen	Sauber-Ford	1:23.195	+2.545
12	19	(Finland) Mika Salo	Tyrrell-Yamaha	1:23.224	+2.574
13	17	(Netherlands) Jos Verstappen	Footwork-Hart	1:23.371	+2.721
14	8	(United Kingdom) David Coulthard	McLaren-Mercedes	1:23.416	+2.766
15	12	(United Kingdom) Martin Brundle	Jordan-Peugeot	1:23.438	+2.788
16	18	(Japan) Ukyo Katayama	Tyrrell-Yamaha	1:24.401	+3.751
17	10	(Brazil) Pedro Diniz	Ligier-Mugen-Honda	1:24.468	+3.818
18	20	(Portugal) Pedro Lamy	Minardi-Ford	1:25.274	+4.624
19	21	(Italy) Giancarlo Fisichella	Minardi-Ford	1:25.531	+4.881
20	16	(Brazil) Ricardo Rosset	Footwork-Hart	1:25.621	+4.971
107% time: 1:26.296
DNQ	22	(Italy) Luca Badoer	Forti-Ford	1:26.615	+5.965
DNQ	23	(Italy) Andrea Montermini	Forti-Ford	1:27.358	+6.708

=== Race ===
Pos	No	Driver	Constructor	Laps	Time/Retired	Grid	Points
1	1	(Germany) Michael Schumacher	Ferrari	65	1:59:49.307	3	10
2	3	(France) Jean Alesi	Benetton-Renault	65	+ 45.302	4	6
3	6	(Canada) Jacques Villeneuve	Williams-Renault	65	+ 48.388	2	4
4	15	(Germany) Heinz-Harald Frentzen	Sauber-Ford	64	+ 1 Lap	11	3
5	7	(Finland) Mika Häkkinen	McLaren-Mercedes	64	+ 1 Lap	10	2
6	10	(Brazil) Pedro Diniz	Ligier-Mugen-Honda	63	+ 2 Laps	17	1
Ret	17	(Netherlands) Jos Verstappen	Footwork-Hart	47	Spun off	13	
Ret	11	(Brazil) Rubens Barrichello	Jordan-Peugeot	45	Clutch	7	
Ret	4	(Austria) Gerhard Berger	Benetton-Renault	44	Spun off	5	
Ret	14	(United Kingdom) Johnny Herbert	Sauber-Ford	20	Spun off	9	
Ret	12	(United Kingdom) Martin Brundle	Jordan-Peugeot	17	Differential	15	
Ret	5	(United Kingdom) Damon Hill	Williams-Renault	10	Spun off	1	
Ret	18	(Japan) Ukyo Katayama	Tyrrell-Yamaha	8	Electrical	16	
Ret	2	(United Kingdom) Eddie Irvine	Ferrari	1	Spun off	6	
Ret	9	(France) Olivier Panis	Ligier-Mugen-Honda	1	Collision damage	8	
Ret	21	(Italy) Giancarlo Fisichella	Minardi-Ford	1	Collision damage	19	
Ret	8	(United Kingdom) David Coulthard	McLaren-Mercedes	0	Collision	14	
Ret	20	(Portugal) Pedro Lamy	Minardi-Ford	0	Collision	18	
Ret	16	(Brazil) Ricardo Rosset	Footwork-Hart	0	Collision	20	
DSQ	19	(Finland) Mika Salo	Tyrrell-Yamaha	16	Illegal car change	12	

== Championship standings after the race ==
Drivers' Championship standings

Pos	Driver	Points
1	(United Kingdom) Damon Hill	43
2	(Canada) Jacques Villeneuve	26
3	(Germany) Michael Schumacher	26
4	(France) Jean Alesi	17
5	(France) Olivier Panis	11

Constructors' Championship standings

Pos	Constructor	Points
1	(United Kingdom) Williams-Renault	69
2	(Italy) Ferrari	35
3	(Italy) Benetton-Renault	24
4	(United Kingdom) McLaren-Mercedes	18
5	(France) Ligier-Mugen-Honda	12

- Note: Only the top five positions are included for both sets of standings.

Previous race: 1996 Monaco Grand Prix	FIA Formula One World Championship; 1996 season	Next race: 1996 Canadian Grand Prix
Previous race: 1995 Spanish Grand Prix	Spanish Grand Prix	Next race: 1997 Spanish Grand Prix
