= 1996 Canadian Grand Prix =

Race 8 of 16 in the 1996 Formula One World Championship
← Previous race	Next race →

Race details
- Date: 16 June 1996
- Official name: XXXIV Grand Prix Molson du Canada
- Location: Circuit Gilles Villeneuve; Montreal, Quebec, Canada
- Course: Street circuit
- Course length: 4.421 km (2.747 miles)
- Distance: 69 laps, 305.049 km (189.549 miles)
- Weather: Mostly sunny and warm with temperatures approaching 26 °C (79 °F)

Pole position
Driver	(United Kingdom) Damon Hill	Williams-Renault
- Time: 1:21.059

Fastest lap
Driver	(Canada) Jacques Villeneuve	Williams-Renault
- Time: 1:21.916 on lap 67

Podium
First	(United Kingdom) Damon Hill	Williams-Renault
Second	(Canada) Jacques Villeneuve	Williams-Renault
Third	(France) Jean Alesi	Benetton-Renault

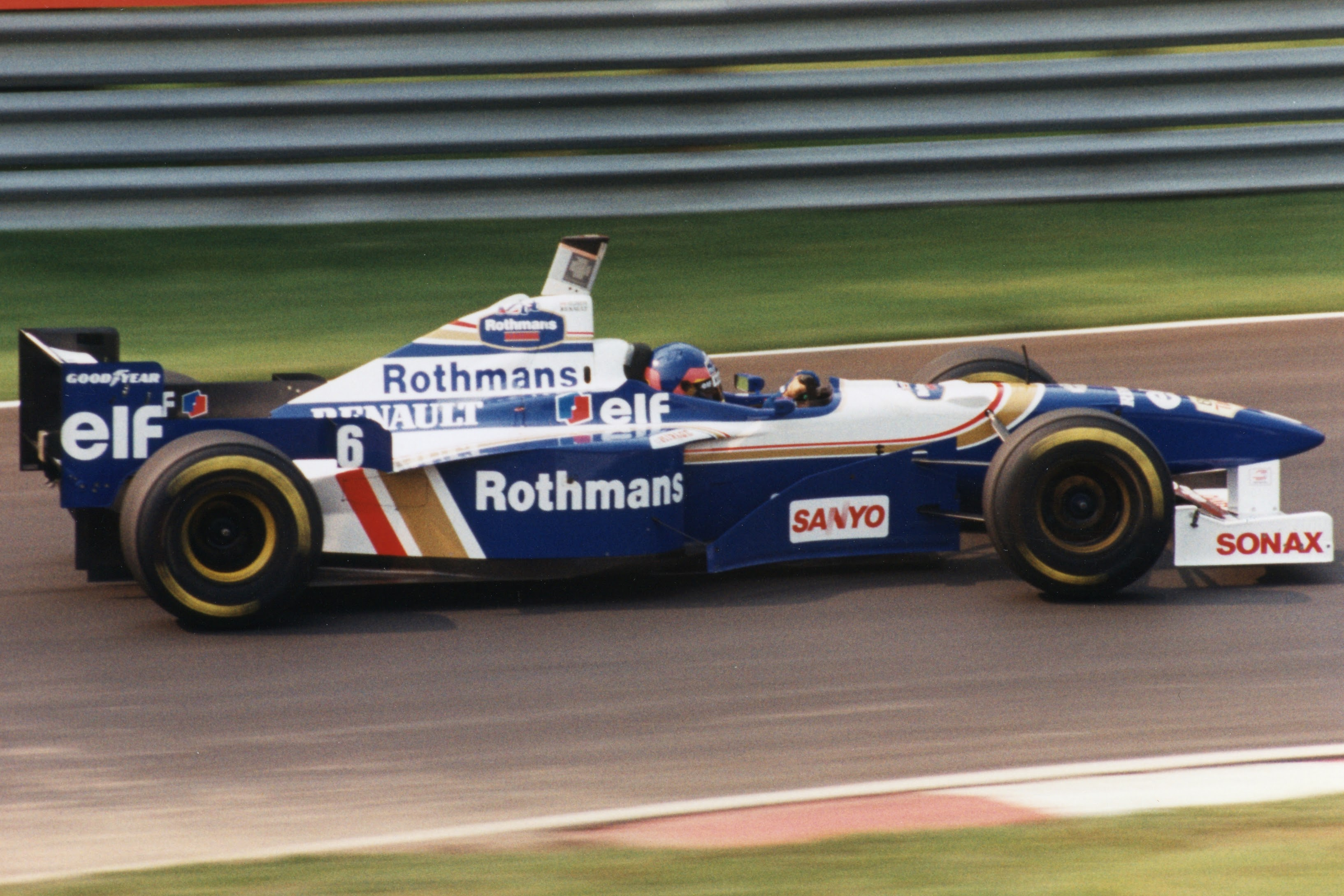
Local driver Jacques Villeneuve finished second in his Williams-Renault, his best result at home in Formula One.

The 1996 Canadian Grand Prix was a Formula One motor race held at the Circuit Gilles Villeneuve, Montreal on 16 June 1996. It was the eighth race of the 1996 Formula One World Championship.

The 69-lap race was won from pole position by Briton Damon Hill, driving a Williams-Renault. Local driver Jacques Villeneuve, Hill's teammate and the son of Gilles, finished second, with Frenchman Jean Alesi third in a Benetton-Renault.

== Report ==
Michael Schumacher started from the back of the grid, as his car suffered a fuel pressure problem as the field set off on the warm-up lap. This started a run of mechanical problems for the reigning double World Champion.

Eddie Irvine became the first retirement from 4th position in the leading Ferrari on lap 2 when his suspension failed, he was then followed out by Ukyo Katayama in the second Tyrrell and Ricardo Rosset in the second Footwork when they collided at the final chicane on lap 7 due to Katayama missing his braking point. Before Rosset's teammate Jos Verstappen in the leading Footwork retired in the pits on lap 11 when his engine failed. Rubens Barrichello in the second Jordan after passing Mika Hakkinen for 6th position would also be forced the retire on lap 23 in the pits after his first pit stop when his clutch failed. Michael Schumacher after starting at the back of the grid due to a clutch problem, was able to fight his way up to 13th position, but would soon retire due to driveshaft failure on lap 42 which started the first of three consecutive races which both Ferrari's would fail to finish a race due to mechanical failures. For the second successive race, Gerhard Berger spun off and hit the wall while trying to pass teammate Jean Alesi on lap 43 at turn 4. Alesi continued to third place, while further behind Martin Brundle, running fourth following Berger's exit, had to pit for a new nose-cone following a collision with Pedro Lamy's Minardi when Lamy inadvertently hit Brundle's front wing as he attempted to rejoin the track after a spin on lap 45, dropping Brundle to seventh and handing fourth place to David Coulthard's McLaren. Brundle eventually recovered to sixth place behind Mika Häkkinen in the sister McLaren after getting past Johnny Herbert courtesy of a faster final pit stop.

== Classification ==
=== Qualifying ===
Pos	No	Driver	Constructor	Time	Gap
1	5	(United Kingdom) Damon Hill	Williams-Renault	1:21.059	
2	6	(Canada) Jacques Villeneuve	Williams-Renault	1:21.079	+0.020
3	1	(Germany) Michael Schumacher	Ferrari	1:21.198	+0.139
4	3	(France) Jean Alesi	Benetton-Renault	1:21.529	+0.470
5	2	(United Kingdom) Eddie Irvine	Ferrari	1:21.657	+0.598
6	7	(Finland) Mika Häkkinen	McLaren-Mercedes	1:21.807	+0.748
7	4	(Austria) Gerhard Berger	Benetton-Renault	1:21.926	+0.867
8	11	(Brazil) Rubens Barrichello	Jordan-Peugeot	1:21.982	+0.923
9	12	(United Kingdom) Martin Brundle	Jordan-Peugeot	1:22.321	+1.262
10	8	(United Kingdom) David Coulthard	McLaren-Mercedes	1:22.332	+1.273
11	9	(France) Olivier Panis	Ligier-Mugen-Honda	1:22.481	+1.422
12	15	(Germany) Heinz-Harald Frentzen	Sauber-Ford	1:22.875	+1.816
13	17	(Netherlands) Jos Verstappen	Footwork-Hart	1:23.067	+2.008
14	19	(Finland) Mika Salo	Tyrrell-Yamaha	1:23.118	+2.059
15	14	(United Kingdom) Johnny Herbert	Sauber-Ford	1:23.201	+2.142
16	21	(Italy) Giancarlo Fisichella	Minardi-Ford	1:23.519	+2.460
17	18	(Japan) Ukyo Katayama	Tyrrell-Yamaha	1:23.599	+2.540
18	10	(Brazil) Pedro Diniz	Ligier-Mugen-Honda	1:23.959	+2.900
19	20	(Portugal) Pedro Lamy	Minardi-Ford	1:24.262	+3.203
20	22	(Italy) Luca Badoer	Forti-Ford	1:25.012	+3.953
21	16	(Brazil) Ricardo Rosset	Footwork-Hart	1:25.193	+4.134
22	23	(Italy) Andrea Montermini	Forti-Ford	1:26.109	+5.050
107% time: 1:26.733

=== Race ===
Pos	No	Driver	Constructor	Laps	Time/Retired	Grid	Points
1	5	(United Kingdom) Damon Hill	Williams-Renault	69	1:36:03.465	1	10
2	6	(Canada) Jacques Villeneuve	Williams-Renault	69	+ 4.183	2	6
3	3	(France) Jean Alesi	Benetton-Renault	69	+ 54.656	4	4
4	8	(United Kingdom) David Coulthard	McLaren-Mercedes	69	+ 1:03.673	10	3
5	7	(Finland) Mika Häkkinen	McLaren-Mercedes	68	+ 1 Lap	6	2
6	12	(United Kingdom) Martin Brundle	Jordan-Peugeot	68	+ 1 Lap	9	1
7	14	(United Kingdom) Johnny Herbert	Sauber-Ford	68	+ 1 Lap	15	
8	21	(Italy) Giancarlo Fisichella	Minardi-Ford	67	+ 2 Laps	16	
Ret	20	(Portugal) Pedro Lamy	Minardi-Ford	44	Collision	19	
Ret	22	(Italy) Luca Badoer	Forti-Ford	44	Gearbox	20	
Ret	4	(Austria) Gerhard Berger	Benetton-Renault	42	Spun Off	7	
Ret	1	(Germany) Michael Schumacher	Ferrari	41	Halfshaft	3	
Ret	9	(France) Olivier Panis	Ligier-Mugen-Honda	39	Engine	11	
Ret	19	(Finland) Mika Salo	Tyrrell-Yamaha	39	Engine	14	
Ret	10	(Brazil) Pedro Diniz	Ligier-Mugen-Honda	38	Engine	18	
Ret	11	(Brazil) Rubens Barrichello	Jordan-Peugeot	22	Clutch	8	
Ret	23	(Italy) Andrea Montermini	Forti-Ford	22	Electrical	22	
Ret	15	(Germany) Heinz-Harald Frentzen	Sauber-Ford	19	Gearbox	12	
Ret	17	(Netherlands) Jos Verstappen	Footwork-Hart	10	Engine	13	
Ret	16	(Brazil) Ricardo Rosset	Footwork-Hart	6	Collision Damage	21	
Ret	18	(Japan) Ukyo Katayama	Tyrrell-Yamaha	6	Collision	17	
Ret	2	(United Kingdom) Eddie Irvine	Ferrari	1	Suspension	5	

== Championship standings after the race ==
Drivers' Championship standings

Pos	Driver	Points
1	(United Kingdom) Damon Hill	53
2	(Canada) Jacques Villeneuve	32
3	(Germany) Michael Schumacher	26
4	(France) Jean Alesi	21
5	(United Kingdom) David Coulthard	13

Constructors' Championship standings

Pos	Constructor	Points
1	(United Kingdom) Williams-Renault	85
2	(Italy) Ferrari	35
3	(Italy) Benetton-Renault	28
4	(United Kingdom) McLaren-Mercedes	23
5	(France) Ligier-Mugen-Honda	12

- Note: Only the top five positions are included for both sets of standings.

Previous race: 1996 Spanish Grand Prix	FIA Formula One World Championship; 1996 season	Next race: 1996 French Grand Prix
Previous race: 1995 Canadian Grand Prix	Canadian Grand Prix	Next race: 1997 Canadian Grand Prix
