= 1996 Brazilian Grand Prix =

Race 2 of 16 in the 1996 Formula One World Championship
← Previous race	Next race →
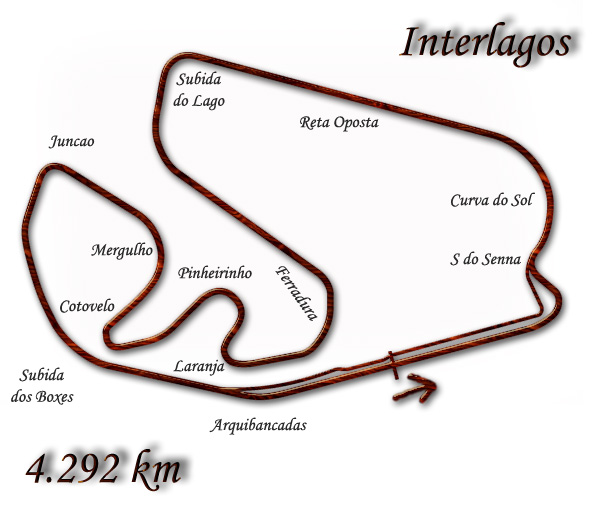

Race details
- Date: 31 March 1996
- Official name: XXV Grande Prêmio do Brasil
- Location: Autódromo José Carlos Pace; Interlagos, São Paulo, Brazil
- Course: Permanent racing facility
- Course length: 4.292 km (2.667 miles)
- Distance: 71 laps, 304.732 km (189.357 miles)
- Weather: Thunderstorm, then drying with temperatures reaching up to 24 °C (75 °F)

Pole position
Driver	(United Kingdom) Damon Hill	Williams-Renault
- Time: 1:18.111

Fastest lap
Driver	(United Kingdom) Damon Hill	Williams-Renault
- Time: 1:21.547 on lap 65

Podium
First	(United Kingdom) Damon Hill	Williams-Renault
Second	(France) Jean Alesi	Benetton-Renault
Third	(Germany) Michael Schumacher	Ferrari

The 1996 Brazilian Grand Prix was a Formula One motor race held at Interlagos, São Paulo on 31 March 1996. It was the second race of the 1996 Formula One World Championship.

The 71-lap race took place in heavy rain, and was won from pole position by Damon Hill, driving a Williams-Renault, with Jean Alesi second in a Benetton-Renault and Michael Schumacher third in a Ferrari.

== Race summary ==
Two local drivers, Tarso Marques (in his début race) and Pedro Diniz, had their qualifying times disallowed for, respectively, a push-start and missing a weight check. However, they were allowed to start from the back of the grid.

Johnny Herbert started from the pit lane after switching to the backup-car due to electrical problems.

Damon Hill, who loved driving in the rain, took the lead and won the race under these difficult conditions with a comfortable winning margin of 17 seconds. São Paulo saw the 15th GP victory of Damon Hill, who thereby outperformed a record established by his father Graham Hill, who had won 14 races.

Major battles in the race were going on between Barrichello and Alesi, Alesi and Villeneuve, Schumacher and Frentzen and Schumacher and Barrichello.

Barrichello, who had qualified as second, lost ground to Villeneuve and Alesi on the first lap, but he kept sticking to the back of the Benetton and attempted to overtake Alesi three times in the early stages of the race, outbraking him into the first corner only to slide wide on the exit allowing Alesi back through.

After a while, Alesi picked up pace and began to harry Villeneuve for 2nd place. After a battle Villeneuve eventually succumbed to the pressure and spun off. Approaching half-distance, Alesi had a brief off track excursion which finally allowed Barrichello through into 2nd place. However, Barrichello was forced to make what was supposed to be his only fuel stop on lap 35, when the track was still too wet for slick tyres. Alesi, on the other hand, did not have to pit until lap 42, by which time the track was dry enough to switch to slick tyres. This forced Barrichello to make unscheduled pit stop to make the switch to slicks, dropping him back behind Alesi.

To compound his misfortune, Barrichello made the switch too late, three laps later than Schumacher, meaning that he also dropped behind the German when he finally made his stop. With a clearly faster car, Barrichello began to harry Schumacher for the final podium spot. However, the German would not give in and eventually he braked too late and spun off into the gravel at the end of the back straight.

Gerhard Berger had to park his Benetton in the pits after 27 laps. The Austrian had difficulties during qualifying which he could not explain. When the race then started under wet conditions, Berger had to drive carefully because he had never before piloted the Benetton in the rain. Not too unsatisfied with his performance, Berger experienced cut-offs due to hydraulic problems which became worse and worse and finally forced the car back to the garage.

== Classification ==
=== Qualifying ===
Pos	No	Driver	Constructor	Time	Gap	Grid
1	5	(United Kingdom) Damon Hill	Williams-Renault	1:18.111		1
2	11	(Brazil) Rubens Barrichello	Jordan-Peugeot	1:19.092	+0.981	2
3	6	(Canada) Jacques Villeneuve	Williams-Renault	1:19.254	+1.143	3
4	1	(Germany) Michael Schumacher	Ferrari	1:19.474	+1.363	4
5	3	(France) Jean Alesi	Benetton-Renault	1:19.484	+1.373	5
6	12	(United Kingdom) Martin Brundle	Jordan-Peugeot	1:19.519	+1.408	6
7	7	(Finland) Mika Häkkinen	McLaren-Mercedes	1:19.607	+1.496	7
8	4	(Austria) Gerhard Berger	Benetton-Renault	1:19.762	+1.651	8
9	15	(Germany) Heinz-Harald Frentzen	Sauber-Ford	1:19.799	+1.688	9
10	2	(United Kingdom) Eddie Irvine	Ferrari	1:19.951	+1.840	10
11	19	(Finland) Mika Salo	Tyrrell-Yamaha	1:20.000	+1.889	11
12	14	(United Kingdom) Johnny Herbert	Sauber-Ford	1:20.144	+2.033	PL^{1}
13	17	(Netherlands) Jos Verstappen	Footwork-Hart	1:20.157	+2.046	13
14	8	(United Kingdom) David Coulthard	McLaren-Mercedes	1:20.167	+2.056	14
15	9	(France) Olivier Panis	Ligier-Mugen-Honda	1:20.426	+2.315	15
16	18	(Japan) Ukyo Katayama	Tyrrell-Yamaha	1:20.427	+2.316	16
17	16	(Brazil) Ricardo Rosset	Footwork-Hart	1:20.440	+2.329	17
18	20	(Portugal) Pedro Lamy	Minardi-Ford	1:21.491	+3.380	18
19	22	(Italy) Luca Badoer	Forti-Ford	1:23.174	+5.063	19
20	23	(Italy) Andrea Montermini	Forti-Ford	1:23.454	+5.343	20
107% time: 1:23.579
EX	10	(Brazil) Pedro Diniz	Ligier-Mugen-Honda	no time		22^{2}
EX	21	(Brazil) Tarso Marques	Minardi-Ford	no time		21^{2}
Sources:

- ^1 Herbert started at the pit lane after switching to his spare car.
- ^2 Diniz and Marques had their times deleted after receiving outside assistance, but were allowed to start at the back of the grid.

=== Race ===
Pos	No	Driver	Constructor	Laps	Time/Retired	Grid	Points
1	5	(United Kingdom) Damon Hill	Williams-Renault	71	1:49:52.976	1	10
2	3	(France) Jean Alesi	Benetton-Renault	71	+ 17.982	5	6
3	1	(Germany) Michael Schumacher	Ferrari	70	+ 1 Lap	4	4
4	7	(Finland) Mika Häkkinen	McLaren-Mercedes	70	+ 1 Lap	7	3
5	19	(Finland) Mika Salo	Tyrrell-Yamaha	70	+ 1 Lap	11	2
6	9	(France) Olivier Panis	Ligier-Mugen-Honda	70	+ 1 Lap	15	1
7	2	(United Kingdom) Eddie Irvine	Ferrari	70	+ 1 Lap	10	
8	10	(Brazil) Pedro Diniz	Ligier-Mugen-Honda	69	+ 2 Laps	22	
9	18	(Japan) Ukyo Katayama	Tyrrell-Yamaha	69	+ 2 Laps	16	
10	20	(Portugal) Pedro Lamy	Minardi-Ford	68	+ 3 Laps	18	
11	22	(Italy) Luca Badoer	Forti-Ford	67	+ 4 Laps	19	
12	12	(United Kingdom) Martin Brundle	Jordan-Peugeot	64	Spun Off	6	
Ret	11	(Brazil) Rubens Barrichello	Jordan-Peugeot	59	Spun Off	2	
Ret	15	(Germany) Heinz-Harald Frentzen	Sauber-Ford	36	Engine	9	
Ret	8	(United Kingdom) David Coulthard	McLaren-Mercedes	29	Spun Off	14	
Ret	14	(United Kingdom) Johnny Herbert	Sauber-Ford	28	Engine	PL	
Ret	6	(Canada) Jacques Villeneuve	Williams-Renault	26	Spun Off	3	
Ret	4	(Austria) Gerhard Berger	Benetton-Renault	26	Hydraulics	8	
Ret	23	(Italy) Andrea Montermini	Forti-Ford	26	Spun Off	20	
Ret	16	(Brazil) Ricardo Rosset	Footwork-Hart	24	Spun Off	17	
Ret	17	(Netherlands) Jos Verstappen	Footwork-Hart	19	Engine	13	
Ret	21	(Brazil) Tarso Marques	Minardi-Ford	0	Spun Off	21	

== Championship standings after the race ==
Drivers' Championship standings

Pos	Driver	Points
1	(United Kingdom) Damon Hill	20
2	(France) Jean Alesi	6
3	(Canada) Jacques Villeneuve	6
4	(Finland) Mika Häkkinen	5
5	(Germany) Michael Schumacher	4

Constructors' Championship standings

Pos	Constructor	Points
1	(United Kingdom) Williams-Renault	26
2	(Italy) Benetton-Renault	9
3	(Italy) Ferrari	8
4	(United Kingdom) McLaren-Mercedes	5
5	(United Kingdom) Tyrrell-Yamaha	3

- Note: Only the top five positions are included for both sets of standings.

Previous race: 1996 Australian Grand Prix	FIA Formula One World Championship; 1996 season	Next race: 1996 Argentine Grand Prix
Previous race: 1995 Brazilian Grand Prix	Brazilian Grand Prix	Next race: 1997 Brazilian Grand Prix
