= 1996 French Grand Prix =

Race 9 of 16 in the 1996 Formula One World Championship
← Previous race	Next race →

Race details
- Date: 30 June 1996
- Official name: LXXXII French Grand Prix
- Location: Circuit de Nevers, Magny-Cours, France
- Course: Permanent racing facility
- Course length: 4.250 km (2.641 miles)
- Distance: 72 laps, 305.814 km (190.024 miles)
- Weather: Dry

Pole position
Driver	(Germany) Michael Schumacher	Ferrari
- Time: 1:15.989

Fastest lap
Driver	(Canada) Jacques Villeneuve	Williams-Renault
- Time: 1:18.610 on lap 48

Podium
First	(United Kingdom) Damon Hill	Williams-Renault
Second	(Canada) Jacques Villeneuve	Williams-Renault
Third	(France) Jean Alesi	Benetton-Renault

The 1996 French Grand Prix was a Formula One motor race held at Circuit de Nevers, Magny-Cours, France on 30 June 1996. It was the ninth race of the 1996 Formula One World Championship.

The 72-lap race was won by Briton Damon Hill, driving a Williams-Renault, after he started from second position. German Michael Schumacher took pole position in his Ferrari but failed to start the race after his engine blew on the warm-up lap, leaving Hill to lead from start to finish except for the pit stops. Hill's teammate, Canadian Jacques Villeneuve, who had crashed heavily at Estoril corner in qualifying, finished second, with local driver Jean Alesi third in a Benetton-Renault.

This was the last Grand Prix where a Forti car started the race as they would fail to qualify for the remaining Grand Prix they would enter, however both cars were forced to retire.

This Grand Prix marked the debut of Mercedes-supplied safety cars to Formula One, a partnership which is still in place as of 2026.

== Classification ==
=== Qualifying ===
Pos	No	Driver	Constructor	Time	Gap
1	1	(Germany) Michael Schumacher	Ferrari	1:15.989	
2	5	(United Kingdom) Damon Hill	Williams-Renault	1:16.058	+0.069
3	3	(France) Jean Alesi	Benetton-Renault	1:16.310	+0.321
4	4	(Austria) Gerhard Berger	Benetton-Renault	1:16.592	+0.603
5	7	(Finland) Mika Häkkinen	McLaren-Mercedes	1:16.634	+0.645
6	6	(Canada) Jacques Villeneuve	Williams-Renault	1:16.905	+0.916
7	8	(United Kingdom) David Coulthard	McLaren-Mercedes	1:17.007	+1.018
8	12	(United Kingdom) Martin Brundle	Jordan-Peugeot	1:17.187	+1.198
9	9	(France) Olivier Panis	Ligier-Mugen-Honda	1:17.390	+1.401
10	11	(Brazil) Rubens Barrichello	Jordan-Peugeot	1:17.665	+1.676
11	10	(Brazil) Pedro Diniz	Ligier-Mugen-Honda	1:17.676	+1.687
12	15	(Germany) Heinz-Harald Frentzen	Sauber-Ford	1:17.739	+1.750
13	19	(Finland) Mika Salo	Tyrrell-Yamaha	1:18.021	+2.032
14	18	(Japan) Ukyo Katayama	Tyrrell-Yamaha	1:18.242	+2.253
15	17	(Netherlands) Jos Verstappen	Footwork-Hart	1:18.324	+2.335
16	14	(United Kingdom) Johnny Herbert	Sauber-Ford	1:18.556	+2.567
17	21	(Italy) Giancarlo Fisichella	Minardi-Ford	1:18.604	+2.615
18	20	(Portugal) Pedro Lamy	Minardi-Ford	1:19.210	+3.221
19	16	(Brazil) Ricardo Rosset	Footwork-Hart	1:19.242	+3.253
20	22	(Italy) Luca Badoer	Forti-Ford	1:20.562	+4.573
21	23	(Italy) Andrea Montermini	Forti-Ford	1:20.647	+4.658
107% time: 1:21.308
22	2	(United Kingdom) Eddie Irvine^{1}	Ferrari		

^1 Eddie Irvine had qualified 10th, but had all his qualifying times deleted and was demoted to the back of the grid after one of the air deflectors on his Ferrari was found to be too tall.

=== Race ===
Pos	No	Driver	Constructor	Laps	Time/Retired	Grid	Points
1	5	(United Kingdom) Damon Hill	Williams-Renault	72	1:36:28.795	2	10
2	6	(Canada) Jacques Villeneuve	Williams-Renault	72	+ 8.127	6	6
3	3	(France) Jean Alesi	Benetton-Renault	72	+ 46.442	3	4
4	4	(Austria) Gerhard Berger	Benetton-Renault	72	+ 46.859	4	3
5	7	(Finland) Mika Häkkinen	McLaren-Mercedes	72	+ 1:02.774	5	2
6	8	(United Kingdom) David Coulthard	McLaren-Mercedes	71	+ 1 lap	7	1
7	9	(France) Olivier Panis	Ligier-Mugen-Honda	71	+ 1 lap	9	
8	12	(United Kingdom) Martin Brundle	Jordan-Peugeot	71	+ 1 lap	8	
9	11	(Brazil) Rubens Barrichello	Jordan-Peugeot	71	+ 1 lap	10	
10	19	(Finland) Mika Salo	Tyrrell-Yamaha	70	+ 2 laps	13	
11	16	(Brazil) Ricardo Rosset	Footwork-Hart	69	+ 3 laps	19	
12	20	(Portugal) Pedro Lamy	Minardi-Ford	69	+ 3 laps	18	
DSQ	14	(United Kingdom) Johnny Herbert	Sauber-Ford	70	Bodywork	16	
Ret	15	(Germany) Heinz-Harald Frentzen	Sauber-Ford	56	Throttle	12	
Ret	18	(Japan) Ukyo Katayama	Tyrrell-Yamaha	33	Engine	14	
Ret	22	(Italy) Luca Badoer	Forti-Ford	29	Fuel system	20	
Ret	10	(Brazil) Pedro Diniz	Ligier-Mugen-Honda	28	Engine	11	
Ret	17	(Netherlands) Jos Verstappen	Footwork-Hart	10	Suspension	15	
Ret	2	(United Kingdom) Eddie Irvine	Ferrari	5	Gearbox	22	
Ret	21	(Italy) Giancarlo Fisichella	Minardi-Ford	2	Fuel pump	17	
Ret	23	(Italy) Andrea Montermini	Forti-Ford	2	Electrical	21	
DNS	1	(Germany) Michael Schumacher	Ferrari	0	Engine	–	

== Championship standings after the race ==
Drivers' Championship standings

Pos	Driver	Points
1	(United Kingdom) Damon Hill	63
2	(Canada) Jacques Villeneuve	38
3	(Germany) Michael Schumacher	26
4	(France) Jean Alesi	25
5	(United Kingdom) David Coulthard	14

Constructors' Championship standings

Pos	Constructor	Points
1	(United Kingdom) Williams-Renault	101
2	(Italy) Ferrari	35
3	(Italy) Benetton-Renault	35
4	(United Kingdom) McLaren-Mercedes	26
5	(France) Ligier-Mugen-Honda	12

- Note: Only the top five positions are included for both sets of standings.

Previous race: 1996 Canadian Grand Prix	FIA Formula One World Championship; 1996 season	Next race: 1996 British Grand Prix
Previous race: 1995 French Grand Prix	French Grand Prix	Next race: 1997 French Grand Prix
