= 1996 German Grand Prix =

Race 11 of 16 in the 1996 Formula One World Championship
| ← Previous race | Next race → |

Race details
- Date: 28 July 1996
- Official name: Grosser Mobil 1 Preis von Deutschland
- Location: Hockenheimring; Hockenheim, Baden-Württemberg, Germany
- Course: Permanent racing facility
- Course length: 6.823 km (4.256 miles)
- Distance: 45 laps, 307.035 km (191.537 miles)
- Weather: Sunny, dry

Pole position
| Driver | (United Kingdom) Damon Hill | Williams-Renault |
- Time: 1:43.912

Fastest lap
| Driver | (United Kingdom) Damon Hill | Williams-Renault |
- Time: 1:46.504 on lap 26

Podium
| First | (United Kingdom) Damon Hill | Williams-Renault |
| Second | (France) Jean Alesi | Benetton-Renault |
| Third | (Canada) Jacques Villeneuve | Williams-Renault |

The 1996 German Grand Prix was a Formula One motor race held at Hockenheim on 28 July 1996. It was the eleventh race of the 1996 Formula One World Championship.

The 45-lap race was won by British driver Damon Hill, driving a Williams-Renault, after he started from pole position. Austrian driver Gerhard Berger started alongside Hill on the front row in his Benetton-Renault and led for much of the race, until his engine failed with three laps remaining. Hill duly took his seventh victory of the season, with Berger's French teammate Jean Alesi second and Canadian Jacques Villeneuve third in the other Williams-Renault.

With the win, Hill extended his lead over Villeneuve in the Drivers' Championship to 21 points with five races remaining.

== Classification ==
=== Qualifying ===
| Pos | No | Driver | Constructor | Time | Diff. |
|---|---|---|---|---|---|
| 1 | 5 | (United Kingdom) Damon Hill | Williams-Renault | 1:43.912 | |
| 2 | 4 | (Austria) Gerhard Berger | Benetton-Renault | 1:44.299 | +0.387 |
| 3 | 1 | (Germany) Michael Schumacher | Ferrari | 1:44.477 | +0.565 |
| 4 | 7 | (Finland) Mika Häkkinen | McLaren-Mercedes | 1:44.644 | +0.732 |
| 5 | 3 | (France) Jean Alesi | Benetton-Renault | 1:44.670 | +0.758 |
| 6 | 6 | (Canada) Jacques Villeneuve | Williams-Renault | 1:44.842 | +0.930 |
| 7 | 8 | (United Kingdom) David Coulthard | McLaren-Mercedes | 1:44.951 | +1.039 |
| 8 | 2 | (United Kingdom) Eddie Irvine | Ferrari | 1:45.389 | +1.477 |
| 9 | 11 | (Brazil) Rubens Barrichello | Jordan-Peugeot | 1:45.452 | +1.540 |
| 10 | 12 | (United Kingdom) Martin Brundle | Jordan-Peugeot | 1:45.876 | +1.964 |
| 11 | 10 | (Brazil) Pedro Diniz | Ligier-Mugen-Honda | 1:46.575 | +2.663 |
| 12 | 9 | (France) Olivier Panis | Ligier-Mugen-Honda | 1:46.746 | +2.834 |
| 13 | 15 | (Germany) Heinz-Harald Frentzen | Sauber-Ford | 1:46.899 | +2.987 |
| 14 | 14 | (United Kingdom) Johnny Herbert | Sauber-Ford | 1:47.711 | +3.799 |
| 15 | 19 | (Finland) Mika Salo | Tyrrell-Yamaha | 1:48.139 | +4.227 |
| 16 | 18 | (Japan) Ukyo Katayama | Tyrrell-Yamaha | 1:48.381 | +4.469 |
| 17 | 17 | (Netherlands) Jos Verstappen | Footwork-Hart | 1:48.512 | +4.600 |
| 18 | 20 | (Portugal) Pedro Lamy | Minardi-Ford | 1:49.461 | +5.549 |
| 19 | 16 | (Brazil) Ricardo Rosset | Footwork-Hart | 1:49.551 | +5.639 |
107% time: 1:51.186
| DNQ | 21 | (Italy) Giovanni Lavaggi | Minardi-Ford | 1:51.357 | +7.445 |

=== Race ===
| Pos | No | Driver | Constructor | Laps | Time/Retired | Grid | Points |
|---|---|---|---|---|---|---|---|
| 1 | 5 | (United Kingdom) Damon Hill | Williams-Renault | 45 | 1:21:43.417 | 1 | 10 |
| 2 | 3 | (France) Jean Alesi | Benetton-Renault | 45 | + 11.452 | 5 | 6 |
| 3 | 6 | (Canada) Jacques Villeneuve | Williams-Renault | 45 | + 33.926 | 6 | 4 |
| 4 | 1 | (Germany) Michael Schumacher | Ferrari | 45 | + 41.517 | 3 | 3 |
| 5 | 8 | (United Kingdom) David Coulthard | McLaren-Mercedes | 45 | + 42.196 | 7 | 2 |
| 6 | 11 | (Brazil) Rubens Barrichello | Jordan-Peugeot | 45 | + 1:42.099 | 9 | 1 |
| 7 | 9 | (France) Olivier Panis | Ligier-Mugen-Honda | 45 | + 1:43.912 | 12 | |
| 8 | 15 | (Germany) Heinz-Harald Frentzen | Sauber-Ford | 44 | + 1 lap | 13 | |
| 9 | 19 | (Finland) Mika Salo | Tyrrell-Yamaha | 44 | + 1 lap | 15 | |
| 10 | 12 | (United Kingdom) Martin Brundle | Jordan-Peugeot | 44 | + 1 lap | 10 | |
| 11 | 16 | (Brazil) Ricardo Rosset | Footwork-Hart | 44 | + 1 lap | 19 | |
| 12 | 20 | (Portugal) Pedro Lamy | Minardi-Ford | 43 | + 2 laps | 18 | |
| 13 | 4 | (Austria) Gerhard Berger | Benetton-Renault | 42 | Engine | 2 | |
| Ret | 2 | (United Kingdom) Eddie Irvine | Ferrari | 34 | Gearbox | 8 | |
| Ret | 14 | (United Kingdom) Johnny Herbert | Sauber-Ford | 25 | Vibrations | 14 | |
| Ret | 10 | (Brazil) Pedro Diniz | Ligier-Mugen-Honda | 19 | Engine | 11 | |
| Ret | 18 | (Japan) Ukyo Katayama | Tyrrell-Yamaha | 19 | Spun off | 16 | |
| Ret | 7 | (Finland) Mika Häkkinen | McLaren-Mercedes | 13 | Gearbox | 4 | |
| Ret | 17 | (Netherlands) Jos Verstappen | Footwork-Hart | 0 | Collision | 17 | |

== Notes ==
- Giovanni Lavaggi replaced Giancarlo Fisichella at Minardi for the remainder of the season.
- Though the Forti team arrived, neither of its cars were assembled as the team had run out of money and therefore could not obtain any engines. It closed down shortly afterwards.

== Championship standings after the race ==
Drivers' Championship standings

| Pos | Driver | Points |
|---|---|---|
| 1 | (United Kingdom) Damon Hill | 73 |
| 2 | (Canada) Jacques Villeneuve | 52 |
| 3 | (France) Jean Alesi | 31 |
| 4 | (Germany) Michael Schumacher | 29 |
| 5 | (United Kingdom) David Coulthard | 18 |

Constructors' Championship standings

| Pos | Constructor | Points |
|---|---|---|
| 1 | (United Kingdom) Williams-Renault | 125 |
| 2 | (Italy) Benetton-Renault | 47 |
| 3 | (Italy) Ferrari | 38 |
| 4 | (United Kingdom) McLaren-Mercedes | 34 |
| 5 | (Republic of Ireland) Jordan-Peugeot | 14 |

- Note: Only the top five positions are included for both sets of standings.

| Previous race: 1996 British Grand Prix | FIA Formula One World Championship; 1996 season | Next race: 1996 Hungarian Grand Prix |
| Previous race: 1995 German Grand Prix | German Grand Prix | Next race: 1997 German Grand Prix |
