= 1996 Italian Grand Prix =

Race 14 of 16 in the 1996 Formula One World Championship
← Previous race	Next race →
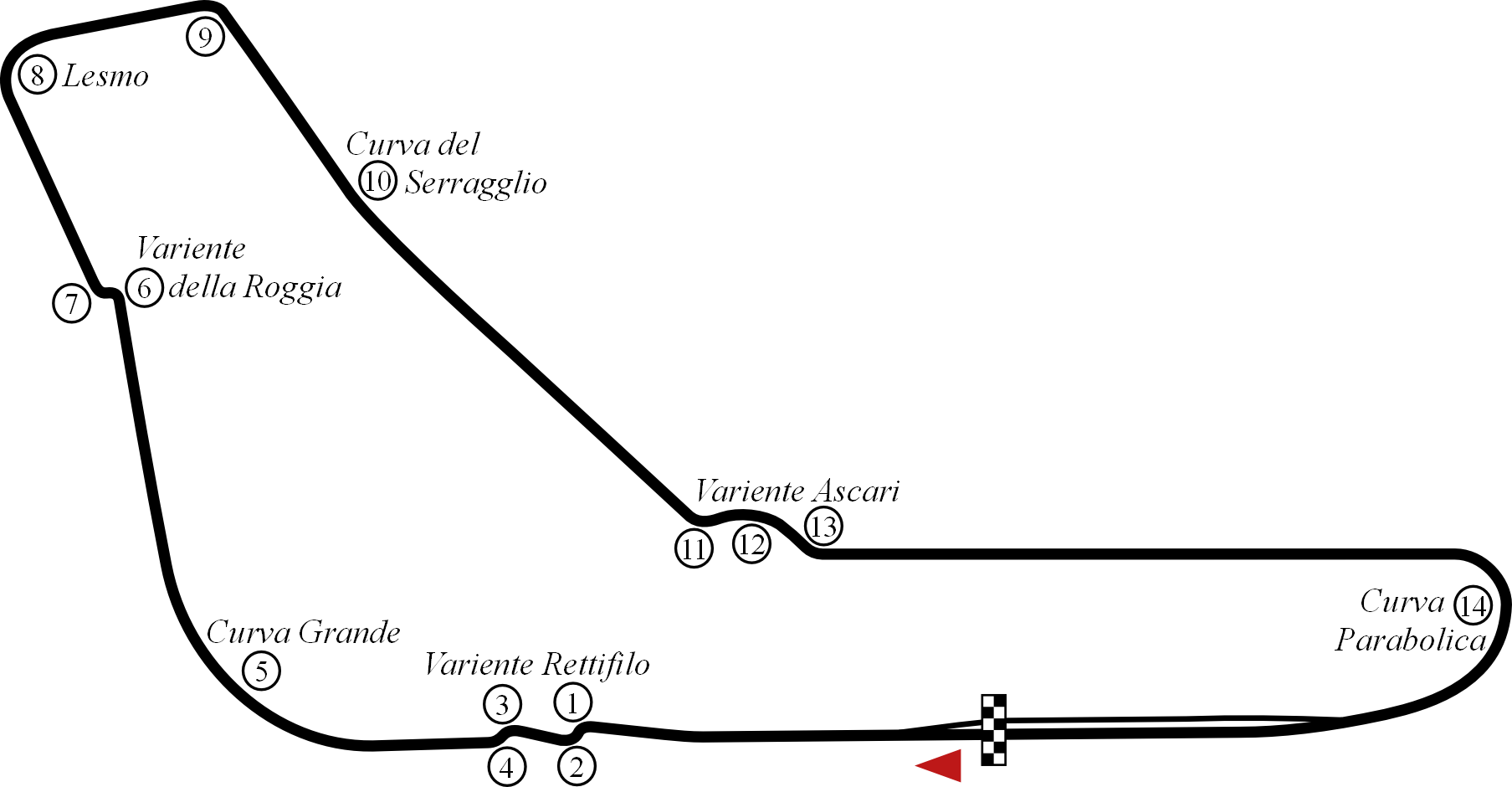

Race details
- Date: 8 September 1996
- Official name: Pioneer 67º Gran Premio d'Italia
- Location: Autodromo Nazionale di Monza; Monza, Lombardy, Italy
- Course: Permanent racing facility
- Course length: 5.770 km (3.585 miles)
- Distance: 53 laps, 305.810 km (190.022 miles)
- Weather: Dry

Pole position
Driver	(United Kingdom) Damon Hill	Williams-Renault
- Time: 1:24.204

Fastest lap
Driver	(Germany) Michael Schumacher	Ferrari
- Time: 1:26.110 on lap 50

Podium
First	(Germany) Michael Schumacher	Ferrari
Second	(France) Jean Alesi	Benetton-Renault
Third	(Finland) Mika Häkkinen	McLaren-Mercedes

The 1996 Italian Grand Prix was a Formula One motor race held on 8 September 1996 at Monza. It was the fourteenth race of the 1996 Formula One World Championship.

The 53-lap race was won by Michael Schumacher, driving a Ferrari, after he started from third position. It was Schumacher's third victory of the season and the Ferrari team's first victory at Monza since 1988. With Schumacher also having won the previous race in Belgium, these were also the first consecutive Ferrari victories since the 1990 season.

Jean Alesi finished second in a Benetton-Renault, with Mika Häkkinen third in a McLaren-Mercedes. Drivers' Championship leader Damon Hill took pole position in his Williams-Renault and led until he made an error and spun off on lap 6, while his teammate and rival, Jacques Villeneuve, could only manage seventh.

== Pre-race ==
To stop cars kerb-hopping at chicanes due to ongoing track modifications at the time of the race, tyre barriers were erected at each chicane. However this caused much controversy during the race, particularly in the opening laps, when two tyres ran free across the track in the path of other drivers. Damon Hill had a comfortable lead but would retire after colliding with the tyres.

== Race ==
Jean Alesi made an excellent start from sixth to lead polesitter Damon Hill into the first corner, but ran wide and struck a tyre stack between the two Lesmos on the opening lap and lost the lead to Hill. Alesi was fortunate to escape with his own car undamaged, but his error caused a tyre to fall on the track and break the front wing of Mika Häkkinen's McLaren. Häkkinen was forced to pit for a new nose-cone, dropping him to seventeenth on the track.

Jacques Villeneuve sent a tyre spinning into David Coulthard's car at the Ascari chicane on the opening lap in a similar incident while trying to pass Michael Schumacher. Villeneuve was able to continue, although the collision with the tyre stack bent his suspension, which slowed his car and forced him to pit for a new set of tyres, a new nose-cone and a new steering wheel, dropping him to sixteenth place and putting him a lap behind. Coulthard was less fortunate, and immediately spun off with a broken suspension pushrod. Villeneuve apologised to Coulthard after the race. Whilst Gerhard Berger in the second Benetton had eventually pulled off before Parabolica when his gearbox failed on lap 5.

Hill was leading by four seconds on lap six when he hit the tyre barriers at the first chicane and retired with broken suspension. Eddie Irvine ran in third place for most of the first half of the race before having a similar accident. In all, eight cars made contact with the tyre barriers after running wide on the track, of which five (Hill, Heinz-Harald Frentzen, Olivier Panis, Ricardo Rosset and Irvine) retired.

Michael Schumacher also hit a tyre stack in the closing stages but continued without damage to his car and won the race. This was his first ever Italian Grand Prix victory after years of misfortunes including the collision with Hill the previous year, as well as his team's first win at Monza since 1988. Alesi, who re-took the lead following Hill's exit, finished second after losing out to Schumacher in the pit stops, and Häkkinen eventually recovered to third place thanks in part to Irvine's retirement. The Jordan-Peugeots of Martin Brundle and Rubens Barrichello finished in fourth and fifth positions respectively after a race-long battle for fourth place, Brundle overtaking at the Parabolica corner after Barrichello accidentally turned his engine off while trying to investigate a clutch problem, and had to get a push-start from the marshalls to continue. Pedro Diniz finished sixth ahead of Villeneuve, who only managed seventh place after Johnny Herbert's engine cut out on the final lap.

== Classification ==
=== Qualifying ===
Pos	No	Driver	Constructor	Time	Diff.
1	5	(United Kingdom) Damon Hill	Williams-Renault	1:24.204	
2	6	(Canada) Jacques Villeneuve	Williams-Renault	1:24.521	+0.317
3	1	(Germany) Michael Schumacher	Ferrari	1:24.781	+0.577
4	7	(Finland) Mika Häkkinen	McLaren-Mercedes	1:24.939	+0.735
5	8	(United Kingdom) David Coulthard	McLaren-Mercedes	1:24.976	+0.772
6	3	(France) Jean Alesi	Benetton-Renault	1:25.201	+0.997
7	2	(United Kingdom) Eddie Irvine	Ferrari	1:25.226	+1.022
8	4	(Austria) Gerhard Berger	Benetton-Renault	1:25.470	+1.266
9	12	(United Kingdom) Martin Brundle	Jordan-Peugeot	1:26.037	+1.833
10	11	(Brazil) Rubens Barrichello	Jordan-Peugeot	1:26.194	+1.990
11	9	(France) Olivier Panis	Ligier-Mugen-Honda	1:26.206	+2.002
12	14	(United Kingdom) Johnny Herbert	Sauber-Ford	1:26.345	+2.141
13	15	(Germany) Heinz-Harald Frentzen	Sauber-Ford	1:26.505	+2.301
14	10	(Brazil) Pedro Diniz	Ligier-Mugen-Honda	1:26.726	+2.522
15	17	(Netherlands) Jos Verstappen	Footwork-Hart	1:27.270	+3.066
16	18	(Japan) Ukyo Katayama	Tyrrell-Yamaha	1:28.234	+4.030
17	19	(Finland) Mika Salo	Tyrrell-Yamaha	1:28.472	+4.268
18	20	(Portugal) Pedro Lamy	Minardi-Ford	1:28.933	+4.729
19	16	(Brazil) Ricardo Rosset	Footwork-Hart	1:29.181	+4.977
20	21	(Italy) Giovanni Lavaggi	Minardi-Ford	1:29.833	+5.629
107% time: 1:30.098

=== Race ===
Pos	No	Driver	Constructor	Laps	Time/Retired	Grid	Points
1	1	(Germany) Michael Schumacher	Ferrari	53	1:17:43.632	3	10
2	3	(France) Jean Alesi	Benetton-Renault	53	+ 18.265	6	6
3	7	(Finland) Mika Häkkinen	McLaren-Mercedes	53	+ 1:06.635	4	4
4	12	(United Kingdom) Martin Brundle	Jordan-Peugeot	53	+ 1:25.217	9	3
5	11	(Brazil) Rubens Barrichello	Jordan-Peugeot	53	+ 1:25.475	10	2
6	10	(Brazil) Pedro Diniz	Ligier-Mugen-Honda	52	+ 1 Lap	14	1
7	6	(Canada) Jacques Villeneuve	Williams-Renault	52	+ 1 Lap	2	
8	17	(Netherlands) Jos Verstappen	Footwork-Hart	52	+ 1 Lap	15	
9	14	(United Kingdom) Johnny Herbert	Sauber-Ford	51	Engine	12	
10	18	(Japan) Ukyo Katayama	Tyrrell-Yamaha	51	+ 2 Laps	16	
Ret	16	(Brazil) Ricardo Rosset	Footwork-Hart	36	Spun Off	19	
Ret	2	(United Kingdom) Eddie Irvine	Ferrari	23	Spun Off	7	
Ret	20	(Portugal) Pedro Lamy	Minardi-Ford	12	Engine	18	
Ret	19	(Finland) Mika Salo	Tyrrell-Yamaha	9	Engine	17	
Ret	15	(Germany) Heinz-Harald Frentzen	Sauber-Ford	7	Spun Off	13	
Ret	5	(United Kingdom) Damon Hill	Williams-Renault	5	Spun Off	1	
Ret	21	(Italy) Giovanni Lavaggi	Minardi-Ford	5	Engine	20	
Ret	4	(Austria) Gerhard Berger	Benetton-Renault	4	Gearbox	8	
Ret	9	(France) Olivier Panis	Ligier-Mugen-Honda	2	Spun Off	11	
Ret	8	(United Kingdom) David Coulthard	McLaren-Mercedes	1	Spun Off	5	

== Championship standings after the race ==
- **Bold text** indicates the World Champions.

Drivers' Championship standings

Pos	Driver	Points
1	(United Kingdom) **Damon Hill***	81
2	(Canada) **Jacques Villeneuve***	68
3	(Germany) Michael Schumacher	49
4	(France) Jean Alesi	44
5	(Finland) Mika Häkkinen	27

Constructors' Championship standings

Pos	Constructor	Points
1	(United Kingdom) **Williams-Renault**	149
2	(Italy) Benetton-Renault	61
3	(Italy) Ferrari	58
4	(United Kingdom) McLaren-Mercedes	45
5	(Republic of Ireland) Jordan-Peugeot	20

- Note: Only the top five positions are included for both sets of standings.

Previous race: 1996 Belgian Grand Prix	FIA Formula One World Championship; 1996 season	Next race: 1996 Portuguese Grand Prix
Previous race: 1995 Italian Grand Prix	Italian Grand Prix	Next race: 1997 Italian Grand Prix
