= 1996 Belgian Grand Prix =

Race 13 of 16 in the 1996 Formula One World Championship
← Previous race	Next race →
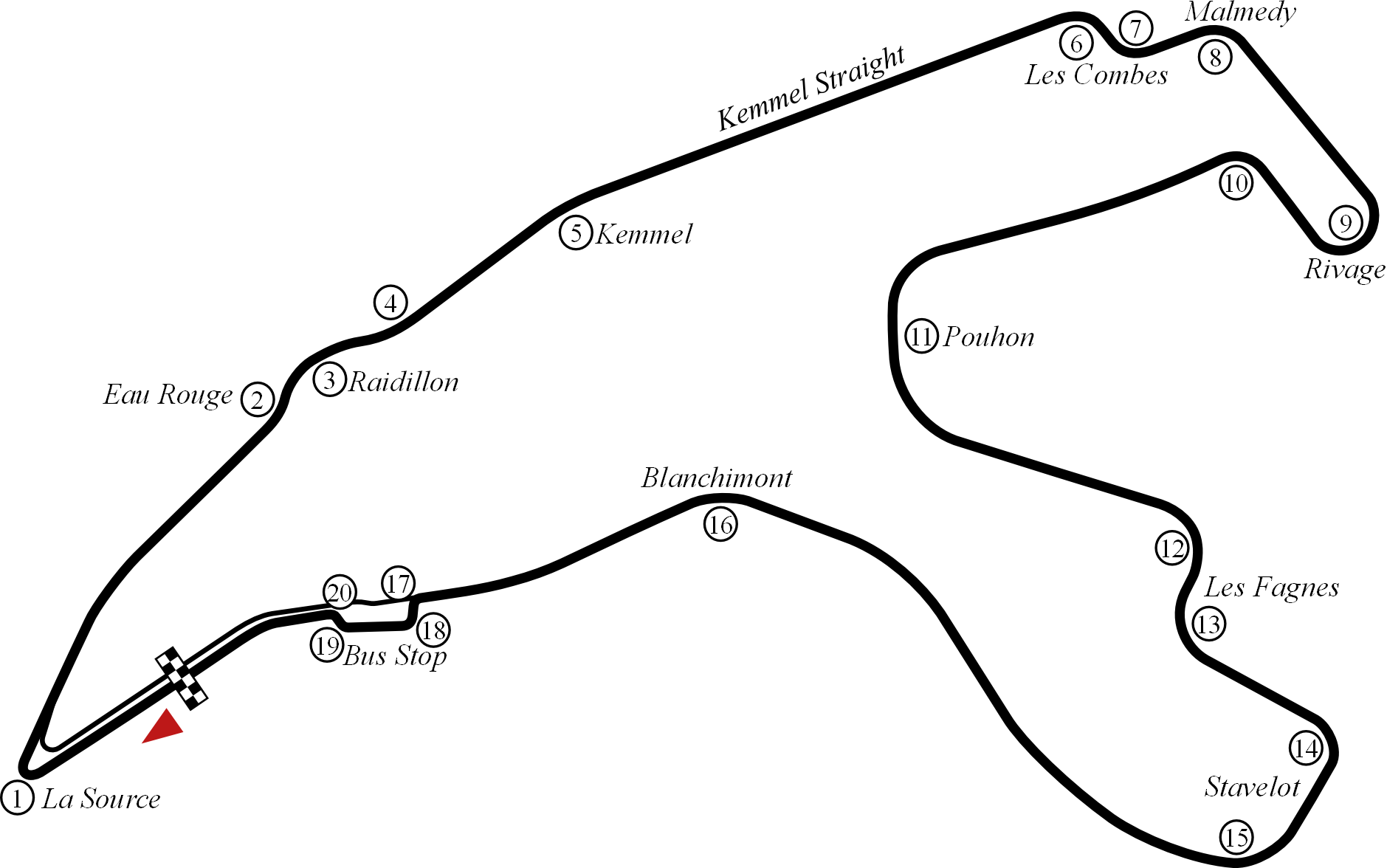

Race details
- Date: 25 August 1996
- Official name: LIV Grand Prix de Belgique
- Location: Circuit de Spa-Francorchamps; Francorchamps, Wallonia, Belgium
- Course: Permanent racing facility
- Course length: 6.968 km (4.330 miles)
- Distance: 44 laps, 306.592 km (190.507 miles)
- Weather: Overcast and dry with temperatures reaching up to 17 °C (63 °F)

Pole position
Driver	(Canada) Jacques Villeneuve	Williams-Renault
- Time: 1:50.574

Fastest lap
Driver	(Austria) Gerhard Berger	Benetton-Renault
- Time: 1:53.067 on lap 42

Podium
First	(Germany) Michael Schumacher	Ferrari
Second	(Canada) Jacques Villeneuve	Williams-Renault
Third	(Finland) Mika Häkkinen	McLaren-Mercedes

The 1996 Belgian Grand Prix (formally the LIV Grand Prix de Belgique) was a Formula One motor race held on 25 August 1996 at Spa-Francorchamps. It was the thirteenth race of the 1996 FIA Formula One World Championship.

The 44-lap race was won by Michael Schumacher, driving a Ferrari. Schumacher had crashed heavily in Friday practice, but recovered to qualify third before taking his second win of the season. Jacques Villeneuve, who had started from pole position, finished second in his Williams-Renault, with Mika Häkkinen third in a McLaren-Mercedes. Villeneuve's teammate and Drivers' Championship leader, Damon Hill, finished fifth.

== Qualifying ==
Pos	No	Driver	Constructor	Time	Diff.
1	6	(Canada) Jacques Villeneuve	Williams-Renault	1:50.574	
2	5	(United Kingdom) Damon Hill	Williams-Renault	1:50.980	+0.406
3	1	(Germany) Michael Schumacher	Ferrari	1:51.778	+1.204
4	8	(United Kingdom) David Coulthard	McLaren-Mercedes	1:51.884	+1.310
5	4	(Austria) Gerhard Berger	Benetton-Renault	1:51.960	+1.386
6	7	(Finland) Mika Häkkinen	McLaren-Mercedes	1:52.318	+1.744
7	3	(France) Jean Alesi	Benetton-Renault	1:52.354	+1.780
8	12	(United Kingdom) Martin Brundle	Jordan-Peugeot	1:52.977	+2.403
9	2	(United Kingdom) Eddie Irvine	Ferrari	1:53.043	+2.469
10	11	(Brazil) Rubens Barrichello	Jordan-Peugeot	1:53.152	+2.578
11	15	(Germany) Heinz-Harald Frentzen	Sauber-Ford	1:53.199	+2.625
12	14	(United Kingdom) Johnny Herbert	Sauber-Ford	1:53.993	+3.419
13	19	(Finland) Mika Salo	Tyrrell-Yamaha	1:54.095	+3.521
14	9	(France) Olivier Panis	Ligier-Mugen-Honda	1:54.220	+3.646
15	10	(Brazil) Pedro Diniz	Ligier-Mugen-Honda	1:54.700	+4.126
16	17	(Netherlands) Jos Verstappen	Footwork-Hart	1:55.150	+4.576
17	18	(Japan) Ukyo Katayama	Tyrrell-Yamaha	1:55.371	+4.797
18	16	(Brazil) Ricardo Rosset	Footwork-Hart	1:56.286	+5.712
19	20	(Portugal) Pedro Lamy	Minardi-Ford	1:56.830	+6.256
107% time: 1:58.314
DNQ	21	(Italy) Giovanni Lavaggi	Minardi-Ford	1:58.579	+8.005

== Race ==
The start of the race saw the two Saubers of Heinz-Harald Frentzen and Johnny Herbert eliminated immediately when they collided at the La Source hairpin after attempting to evade an incident where Olivier Panis spun his Ligier after making contact with Rubens Barrichello's Jordan. Panis also retired on the spot; Barrichello was able to continue, pitting to repair his suspension, although it eventually failed altogether on lap 30.

On lap 10, Jos Verstappen pitted with a sticking throttle. The Footwork Arrows pit crew found no damage and sent Verstappen back out, only for the Dutchman to crash almost immediately. Team boss Tom Walkinshaw confirmed after the race that the throttle problem had not recurred, and that the crash was caused by a faulty wheel bearing. The incident brought out the safety car for seven laps, during which time all the drivers besides the McLarens of Mika Häkkinen and David Coulthard (both running a one-stop strategy) made pit stops. Jacques Villeneuve, leading the race when the safety car came out, missed his pit stop on lap 13. As a result, he lost the lead to Michael Schumacher, who eventually won the race by 5.6 seconds from Villeneuve. The Canadian driver later explained that he had misunderstood the radio instruction to come in, due to the confusion brought about by the deployment of the safety car (as Villeneuve had already passed the site of the crash, and was not fully aware of what had happened). As a further consequence of Villeneuve's error, his teammate Damon Hill was instructed to pit by the Williams engineers on lap 14, only to then be told to stay out - however, as the team were delayed in relaying this change to Hill due to confusion brought about by Villeneuve's failure to make his stop, by the time the team radioed Hill to advise him he needed to remain out, he was already on his way into the pit lane, and had to use the emergency escape lane to rejoin the track. Hill was driving the spare Williams following a misfire in the Sunday morning warm-up session. By the time he finally got to make his pit stop, he had fallen to 13th, but he recovered to finish fifth.

Running in fourth place just after half distance, Gerhard Berger spun off in his Benetton while trying to pass Eddie Irvine's Ferrari, an error which dropped him to 12th. After setting a string of fastest laps he recovered to sixth by the end of the race, coincidentally thanks in part to Irvine's retirement with gearbox problems. Berger's Benetton teammate Jean Alesi finished fourth after Coulthard had spun off into retirement and crashed on lap 38.

The Tyrrells of Mika Salo and Ukyo Katayama finished in seventh and eighth places respectively; however, a fast early stop during the safety car period saw Salo briefly running as high as third at one point.

=== Race classification ===
Pos	No	Driver	Constructor	Laps	Time/Retired	Grid	Points
1	1	(Germany) Michael Schumacher	Ferrari	44	1:28:15.125	3	10
2	6	(Canada) Jacques Villeneuve	Williams-Renault	44	+ 5.602	1	6
3	7	(Finland) Mika Häkkinen	McLaren-Mercedes	44	+ 15.710	6	4
4	3	(France) Jean Alesi	Benetton-Renault	44	+ 19.125	7	3
5	5	(United Kingdom) Damon Hill	Williams-Renault	44	+ 29.179	2	2
6	4	(Austria) Gerhard Berger	Benetton-Renault	44	+ 29.896	5	1
7	19	(Finland) Mika Salo	Tyrrell-Yamaha	44	+ 1:00.754	13	
8	18	(Japan) Ukyo Katayama	Tyrrell-Yamaha	44	+ 1:40.227	17	
9	16	(Brazil) Ricardo Rosset	Footwork-Hart	43	+ 1 Lap	18	
10	20	(Portugal) Pedro Lamy	Minardi-Ford	43	+ 1 Lap	19	
Ret	8	(United Kingdom) David Coulthard	McLaren-Mercedes	37	Spun Off	4	
Ret	12	(United Kingdom) Martin Brundle	Jordan-Peugeot	34	Engine	8	
Ret	2	(United Kingdom) Eddie Irvine	Ferrari	29	Gearbox	9	
Ret	11	(Brazil) Rubens Barrichello	Jordan-Peugeot	29	Suspension	10	
Ret	10	(Brazil) Pedro Diniz	Ligier-Mugen-Honda	22	Electrical	15	
Ret	17	(Netherlands) Jos Verstappen	Footwork-Hart	11	Accident	16	
Ret	15	(Germany) Heinz-Harald Frentzen	Sauber-Ford	0	Collision	11	
Ret	14	(United Kingdom) Johnny Herbert	Sauber-Ford	0	Collision	12	
Ret	9	(France) Olivier Panis	Ligier-Mugen-Honda	0	Collision	14	

== Championship standings after the race ==
- **Bold text** indicates the World Champions.

Drivers' Championship standings

Pos	Driver	Points
1	(United Kingdom) Damon Hill	81
2	(Canada) Jacques Villeneuve	68
3	(Germany) Michael Schumacher	39
4	(France) Jean Alesi	38
5	(Finland) Mika Häkkinen	23

Constructors' Championship standings

Pos	Constructor	Points
1	(United Kingdom) **Williams-Renault**	149
2	(Italy) Benetton-Renault	55
3	(Italy) Ferrari	48
4	(United Kingdom) McLaren-Mercedes	41
5	(Republic of Ireland) Jordan-Peugeot	15

- Note: Only the top five positions are included for both sets of standings.

Previous race: 1996 Hungarian Grand Prix	FIA Formula One World Championship; 1996 season	Next race: 1996 Italian Grand Prix
Previous race: 1995 Belgian Grand Prix	Belgian Grand Prix	Next race: 1997 Belgian Grand Prix
