= 1996 Hungarian Grand Prix =

Race 12 of 16 in the 1996 Formula One World Championship
← Previous race	Next race →

Race details
- Date: 11 August 1996
- Official name: XII Marlboro Magyar Nagydíj
- Location: Hungaroring; Mogyoród, Pest, Hungary
- Course: Permanent racing facility
- Course length: 3.968 km (2.466 miles)
- Distance: 77 laps, 305.536 km (189.851 miles)
- Weather: Sunny with temperatures reaching up to 27 °C (81 °F)

Pole position
Driver	(Germany) Michael Schumacher	Ferrari
- Time: 1:17.129

Fastest lap
Driver	(United Kingdom) Damon Hill	Williams-Renault
- Time: 1:20.093 on lap 67

Podium
First	(Canada) Jacques Villeneuve	Williams-Renault
Second	(United Kingdom) Damon Hill	Williams-Renault
Third	(France) Jean Alesi	Benetton-Renault

The 1996 Hungarian Grand Prix (formally the XII Marlboro Magyar Nagydíj) was a Formula One motor race held at the Hungaroring, Mogyoród, Pest, Hungary on 11 August 1996. It was the twelfth race of the 1996 Formula One World Championship and the eleventh Hungarian Grand Prix.

The 77-lap race was won by Canadian driver Jacques Villeneuve, driving a Williams-Renault, after starting from third position. Villeneuve's teammate and Drivers' Championship leader, Briton Damon Hill, finished second, with Frenchman Jean Alesi third in a Benetton-Renault. This was Williams' fifth 1–2 finish of the season, and it secured their fourth Constructors' Championship in five years.

== Classification ==
=== Qualifying ===
Pos	No	Driver	Constructor	Time	Gap
1	1	(Germany) Michael Schumacher	Ferrari	1:17.129	
2	5	(United Kingdom) Damon Hill	Williams-Renault	1:17.182	+0.053
3	6	(Canada) Jacques Villeneuve	Williams-Renault	1:17.259	+0.130
4	2	(United Kingdom) Eddie Irvine	Ferrari	1:18.617	+1.488
5	3	(France) Jean Alesi	Benetton-Renault	1:18.754	+1.625
6	4	(Austria) Gerhard Berger	Benetton-Renault	1:18.794	+1.665
7	7	(Finland) Mika Häkkinen	McLaren-Mercedes	1:19.116	+1.987
8	14	(United Kingdom) Johnny Herbert	Sauber-Ford	1:19.292	+2.163
9	8	(United Kingdom) David Coulthard	McLaren-Mercedes	1:19.384	+2.255
10	15	(Germany) Heinz-Harald Frentzen	Sauber-Ford	1:19.436	+2.307
11	9	(France) Olivier Panis	Ligier-Mugen-Honda	1:19.538	+2.409
12	12	(United Kingdom) Martin Brundle	Jordan-Peugeot	1:19.828	+2.699
13	11	(Brazil) Rubens Barrichello	Jordan-Peugeot	1:19.966	+2.837
14	18	(Japan) Ukyo Katayama	Tyrrell-Yamaha	1:20.499	+3.370
15	10	(Brazil) Pedro Diniz	Ligier-Mugen-Honda	1:20.665	+3.536
16	19	(Finland) Mika Salo	Tyrrell-Yamaha	1:20.678	+3.549
17	17	(Netherlands) Jos Verstappen	Footwork-Hart	1:20.781	+3.652
18	16	(Brazil) Ricardo Rosset	Footwork-Hart	1:21.590	+4.461
19	20	(Portugal) Pedro Lamy	Minardi-Ford	1:21.713	+4.584
20	21	(Italy) Giovanni Lavaggi	Minardi-Ford	1:22.468	+5.339
107% time: 1:22.528

=== Race ===
Pos	No	Driver	Constructor	Laps	Time/Retired	Grid	Points
1	6	(Canada) Jacques Villeneuve	Williams-Renault	77	1:46:21.134	3	10
2	5	(United Kingdom) Damon Hill	Williams-Renault	77	+ 0.771	2	6
3	3	(France) Jean Alesi	Benetton-Renault	77	+ 1:24.212	5	4
4	7	(Finland) Mika Häkkinen	McLaren-Mercedes	76	+ 1 lap	7	3
5	9	(France) Olivier Panis	Ligier-Mugen-Honda	76	+ 1 lap	11	2
6	11	(Brazil) Rubens Barrichello	Jordan-Peugeot	75	+ 2 laps	13	1
7	18	(Japan) Ukyo Katayama	Tyrrell-Yamaha	74	+ 3 laps	14	
8	16	(Brazil) Ricardo Rosset	Footwork-Hart	74	+ 3 laps	18	
9	1	(Germany) Michael Schumacher	Ferrari	70	Throttle	1	
10	21	(Italy) Giovanni Lavaggi	Minardi-Ford	69	Spun off	20	
Ret	4	(Austria) Gerhard Berger	Benetton-Renault	64	Engine	6	
Ret	15	(Germany) Heinz-Harald Frentzen	Sauber-Ford	50	Electrical	10	
Ret	14	(United Kingdom) Johnny Herbert	Sauber-Ford	35	Engine	8	
Ret	2	(United Kingdom) Eddie Irvine	Ferrari	31	Gearbox	4	
Ret	20	(Portugal) Pedro Lamy	Minardi-Ford	24	Suspension	19	
Ret	8	(United Kingdom) David Coulthard	McLaren-Mercedes	23	Engine	9	
Ret	17	(Netherlands) Jos Verstappen	Footwork-Hart	10	Spun off	17	
Ret	12	(United Kingdom) Martin Brundle	Jordan-Peugeot	5	Spun off	12	
Ret	10	(Brazil) Pedro Diniz	Ligier-Mugen-Honda	1	Collision	15	
Ret	19	(Finland) Mika Salo	Tyrrell-Yamaha	0	Collision	16	

== Championship standings after the race ==
- **Bold text** indicates the World Champions.

Drivers' Championship standings

Pos	Driver	Points
1	(United Kingdom) Damon Hill	79
2	(Canada) Jacques Villeneuve	62
3	(France) Jean Alesi	35
4	(Germany) Michael Schumacher	29
5	(Finland) Mika Häkkinen	19

Constructors' Championship standings

Pos	Constructor	Points
1	(United Kingdom) **Williams-Renault**	141
2	(Italy) Benetton-Renault	51
3	(Italy) Ferrari	38
4	(United Kingdom) McLaren-Mercedes	37
5	(Republic of Ireland) Jordan-Peugeot	15

- Note: Only the top five positions are included for both sets of standings.

Previous race: 1996 German Grand Prix	FIA Formula One World Championship; 1996 season	Next race: 1996 Belgian Grand Prix
Previous race: 1995 Hungarian Grand Prix	Hungarian Grand Prix	Next race: 1997 Hungarian Grand Prix
