= Ford-Cosworth EC / ED engine =

Ford-Cosworth EC / ED

Overview
- Manufacturer: (United States) (United Kingdom) Ford-Cosworth
- Designer: Geoff Goddard
- Production: 1994–1997

Layout
- Configuration: 75° V8
- Displacement: 3.5 L (3,499 cc); 3.0 L (2,994 cc)
- Cylinder bore: 100 mm (3.9 in); 94 mm (3.7 in)
- Piston stroke: 55.69 mm (2.2 in); 53.93 mm (2.1 in)
- Valvetrain: 32-valve, DOHC, four-valves per cylinder

Combustion
- Turbocharger: No
- Fuel system: Direct fuel injection
- Oil system: Dry sump

Output
- Power output: 580–765 hp (433–570 kW)
- Torque output: approx. 230–330 lb⋅ft (312–447 N⋅m)

Chronology
- Predecessor: Ford-Cosworth HB engine
- Successor: Cosworth JD / VJ engine

The EC and ED family are a series of 3.0-litre and 3.5-litre, naturally-aspirated, V8, Formula One racing engines, designed, developed and produced by Ford and Cosworth; and used between 1994 and 1997. The customer engines were used by Benetton, Sauber, Forti, Lola, Simtek, Pacific, Minardi, and Tyrrell.

== Background ==
The HB was developed into 3,498 cc (213.5 cu in) (100 mm x 55.7 mm) EC V8 for the 1994 season. This engine, producing about 740 bhp @ 14,500rpm, was badged as Ford Zetec-R, and Michael Schumacher won the Drivers' World Championship with Benetton (his first of a record 7 championships), in 1994. This was the last Ford-powered F1 title.

For the 1995 season, the F1 engine regulation changed to 3 litres, and the EC's bore and stroke were changed to 94mm x 53.9mm, resulting in 2,992 cc (182.6 cu in) ECA, which was introduced at about 600 brake horsepower (450 kW), and developed to 610 brake horsepower (450 kW) to 630 brake horsepower (470 kW) at 14,000rpm. It was exclusively used by the Sauber team, whose biggest success of the year was Heinz-Harald Frentzen's third place at Monza.

Customer unit Cosworth ED (not badged as Ford Zetec-R) for non-works teams was also made for 1995 with about 580 bhp for Minardi, Simtek (called the EDB), Pacific Racing (EDC) and Forti (EDD) teams. Minardi realised the power deficiency before the season and asked Magneti Marelli to develop a replacement engine management system, with which the engine was called the EDM. Cosworth later updated the ED to ED 2/4 for Tyrrell with 2,995 cc (182.8 cu in) (94mm x 53.95mm) displacement for 600 bhp, which was used until the end of 1997 season. The ill-fated Mastercard Lola team initially entered in 1997 using the Ford ECA engine used by Sauber in 1995 and Forti in 1996. However the team withdrew from the championship before the second round of the season in Brazil, having failed to comfortably failed to qualify for the first race in Australia.

== Cosworth EC (1994) ==
The Cosworth EC is a Cosworth-built and Ford-financed 8-cylinder, 3.5-litre racing engine that was used exclusively by Benetton in the 1994 Formula 1 World Championship under the name Ford Zetec-R. Michael Schumacher won the driver's world championship with the EC this year. The reduced to 3.0-litre version Cosworth ECA, again called Zetec-R, appeared in the 1995 season at Sauber but was far less successful there. It was replaced in 1996 after just two years with the newly designed ten-cylinder engine Cosworth JD in the function of the works engine. As a customer motor, the ECA played practically no role.

In its original form as a 3.5-litre engine, the EC was only in service in 1994. At the same time, Cosworth continued to have the old HB eight-cylinder in its range this year. Because the FIA, under the impression of the fatal accidents of Roland Ratzenberger and Ayrton Senna at the San Marino Grand Prix in 1994 reduced the displacement limit to 3.0 litres for the 1995 season, the EC had to be revised after its first year.

For the third generation of naturally aspirated engines after the DFV/DFZ/DFR and the HB, Cosworth once again opted for the eight-cylinder concept. The main reason was the assumption that by limiting the moving parts compared to ten or twelve cylinders, the overall weight and also the friction losses could be reduced. Like its predecessor, the EC has a cylinder bank angle of 75 degrees. Cosworth changed the bore and stroke ratio in favor of a large bore. The dimensions given by the factory were 99.75 × 55.9 mm; this results in a displacement of 3494.8 cm³. The EC thus has the largest bore of any engine of the 1994 season; only Renault's RS6 ten-cylinder (98 mm) reached similar values. The large bore also affected the engine's length: at 620 mm (24 in), it was as long as the ten-cylinder Honda, Peugeot, and Renault engines; Ilmor's V10, which ran as a Mercedes in the Sauber team in 1994, was even 25 mm shorter. Like all other engines of the 1994 generation, the EC had two overhead camshafts for each bank of cylinders, and for each cylinder, there were two intakes and two exhaust valves. The camshafts were driven by chains and gears. The engine electronics came from Ford. With the EC, Cosworth used expensive special materials for the first time: the combustion chambers were coated with ceramic, the connecting rods and valves were made of titanium and the pistons were made of a magnesium-copper-nickel alloy. A piston weighed only 305 grams. Nevertheless, the weight of the EC at 135 kg was roughly at the level of the current ten-cylinder engines. Engine power of the EC was estimated at around 755 hp in race trim and 765 hp in qualifying trim. This meant that the EC was about 30 hp short of the most powerful ten-cylinder engines, but its power to weight ratio, the most important performance figure was on par or even better than the ten-cylinder engines- although these engines were more powerful, they weighed more.

The EC was an expensive engine to run. A revision was already due after 350 km, so that one engine did not even last a whole weekend.

=== Race entry: Benetton ===
The Benetton team, led by Flavio Briatore and Tom Walkinshaw, has been the preferred partner of Cosworth and Ford since 1987 and during this time has received the latest and most powerful engines exclusively. The Cosworth HB engine, which has been in use since 1989, was considered reliable, but despite continuous further development, depending on the source, had a significant performance deficit compared to the ten or twelve-cylinder engines from Renault and Honda, so that Benetton had no prospect of winning the early 1990s championships. 1992 and 1993 Benetton finished third in the constructors' world championship with the HB, Benetton's top driver Michael Schumacher finished third (1992) and fourth (1993) in the drivers' championship.

For 1994, the redesigned EC again went exclusively to preferred customer Benetton. At the start of the season, it was widely expected that Ayrton Senna and Williams-Renault would once again win the Drivers' and Constructors' Championships. Although the Benetton management called for a significant development but expected only individual victories and no influence on the world title. Flavio Briatore announced second place in the Constructors' Championship as his goal. Schumacher won the first two races of the year while Senna struggled with the new Williams FW16. After Senna's fatal accident in Imola, neither Williams nor McLaren, the top teams of recent years, could compete with Benetton in the long term: Williams was traumatized by the death of Senna and spent the rest of the year mainly with the young, inexperienced driver pairing of Damon Hill and David Coulthard, who could not fully exploit the potential of the Williams FW16, and McLaren had to struggle with adjustment difficulties to the new engine partner Peugeot. After Senna's death, Schumacher won six more world championship races but was also disqualified twice and banned for two races because he disregarded a disqualification in Great Britain. At the end of the year, eight wins and two second places were enough to make Schumacher the 1994 Formula 1 World Champion with 92 points.

== Cosworth ECA (1995-1997) ==
In July 1994 work began on the 3.0-litre version of the EC. Due to lack of time, Cosworth could not design a completely new engine. Rather, the engineers only adapted the block of the EC to the new displacement limit. The displacement of the engine called ECA is 2994 cm³. There was no concrete information about the ratio of bore and stroke of the engine, now called ECA. Furthermore, special materials such as titanium, magnesium, and plastics were used. At 610 mm, the ECA was only 10 mm shorter than its 3.5-litre predecessor, the EC. Most ten-cylinder engines were of similar dimensions. Compared to the EC, the weight was only 5 kg lower at 130 kg. It was similar in weight to the ten-cylinder engines from Renault (132 kg) and Mugen (135 kg), while the V10 blocks from Ilmor (120 kg) and Yamaha (117 kg) as well as the twelve-cylinder from Ferrari (118 kg) were significantly lighter. The maximum speed of the ECA was 15,300 rpm in qualifying mode, while the Renault engine already managed over 16,000 and the Ferrari engine even over 17,000 rpm. The maximum output of the Cosworth eight-cylinder was estimated at 625 to 640 hp. Renault and Ferrari were already at over 700 hp. After initial test runs on the test bench, the ECA was presented to the public in Zurich in January 1995, and the first test drives with Sauber took place in February 1995.

=== 1995: Sauber ===
Peter Sauber's Swiss team, Sauber Motorsport, appeared in Formula 1 in 1993 with Ilmor engines, dubbed Mercedes. With the start of the 1995 season, Mercedes entered into a partnership with McLaren that lasted 20 years. Since McLaren, as usual, insisted on an exclusive relationship, Sauber was no longer an engine partner. After Cosworth's failed attempt to land Jordan Grand Prix as a future exclusive partner - Eddie Jordan was instead able to take over the Peugeot engines in the fall of 1994, which had previously been used by McLaren - Cosworth chose Sauber as the new works team in November 1994, which in this respect took over the role of Benetton Formula. The relationship, which also included personal ties between Sauber and Cosworth, was designed to last two years.

In 1995, Sauber exclusively received the 3.0-litre ECA engine that previously used by Benetton Formula. It did not harmonize with the Sauber C14, which had been designed in late summer 1994 to accommodate the significantly lighter Mercedes engine. Because the decision in favor of the Cosworth engine was made late, the Sauber engineers were only able to superficially adopt the C14 to the ECA engine. This had an adverse effect on the handling, which was described as unpredictable ("erratic"); moreover, the aerodynamics of the C14 was not efficient. In 1995, with the ECA, Sauber was unable to repeat the success that Benetton had achieved the previous year with the original EC version. Third place for Heinz-Harald Frentzen at the Italian Grand Prix was the team's best result this year and also the only podium finish achieved by the ECA in its three-year history. Frentzen came forth again, fifth twice, and sixth four times over the course of the year. His teammate Karl Wendlinger didn't finish at all in six races, Wendlinger's replacement Jean-Christophe Boullion only finished in the points twice in eleven races. Boullion's best finish was fifth place in Germany. At the end of the year, Sauber was seventh in the constructors' championship with 18 points, Frentzen was ninth in the drivers' championship. In 1995, Sauber was by far the best Cosworth team. Of the four customer teams that consistently used ED engines this year, only Minardi score a World Championship point. Simtek, Pacific, and Forti Corse remained without points.

In the 1996 season, Sauber received completely newly developed ten-cylinder engines, which were designated by the manufacturer as Cosworth JD, but was reported by Ford under the designation Zetec-R.

=== 1996: Forti Corse ===
The Forti Corse team from Alessandria made its debut in Formula 1 in 1995 after having been successful in Formula 3000 for many years. Forti entered 1995 with a Cosworth ED customer engine and a chassis harking back to the 1992 Fondmetal GR02. Diniz and teammate Roberto Moreno were the slowest drivers all season; they were often lapped five or six times during races, and were lapped nine times in Argentina.

For the second season, Guido Forti entered into a contract for the expensive ECA customer engines, which should have set the racing team apart from the other Cosworth customer teams. When Pedro Diniz surprisingly switched to Ligier in the winter of 1995/1996 and took his sponsors with him, Forti experienced financial trouble. The completion of the chassis for the 1995 season was delayed, so the team had to continue to use the outdated FG01 in a B version for the first five races of the 1996 season. Forti's drivers, Andrea Montermini and Luca Badoer, had trouble following the 107 percent rule to qualify, which was introduced in view of Forti's poor performances at the beginning of the 1995 season in order to have a reasonably even field in races. With the help of their new sponsor Fin First, Forti finally managed to complete the new FG03, also powered by the customer ECA, for the 1996 San Marino Grand Prix. However, there was no problem-free racing with it. Forti's sponsor Fin First failed to deliver the promised payments. The team then collapsed. Montermini and Badoer could, at the British GP, only manage a few laps to meet the attendance requirement. At the subsequent World Championship race in Germany, the Forti didn't leave the pits, since Cosworth no longer delivered engines to the racing team. After that, Forti Corse ceased racing. Overall, Badoer competed in six races and Montermini competed in four races with the ECA customer engine. Badoer failed to qualify four times and Montermini five times. The customer engine's best result was two tenth places; in Argentina (Montermini in FG01) and San Marino (Badoer in FG03).

=== 1997: Lola ===
The British racing car manufacturer Lola Cars had repeatedly designed customer vehicles for Formula 1 teams since the 1970s, but had never been involved with a works team in the world championship. Lola's clients were Embassy Hill (1974 and 1975), Larrousse (1987 to 1991), and BMS Scuderia Italia (1993). After the 1993 season had been disastrous, Lola was initially unable to find another customer team in Formula 1. In autumn 1996, the company founder Eric Broadley decided on the first factory commitment in Formula 1, which was originally planned to take place in 1998, but then - probably at the insistence of the sponsor Mastercard – was brought forward to 1997 at short notice. Lola didn't have enough time to construct a new chassis in the remaining months. Therefore, the company limited itself to the revision of the prototype T95/30, which had already been built in 1994 for the 1995 season, but was never used. This resulted in the T97/30, which Lola equipped with an ECA eight-cylinder. With it, Lola stood out from the Tyrrell Racing Organization, which was the last Cosworth customer team to use an ED eight-cylinder. However, there is evidence that Tyrrell's engine, which had been further developed into the ED4, was now at least as powerful as the ECA, which Cosworth had not revised since 1995. For Broadley, the Cosworth engine was only to be an interim solution until a ten-cylinder engine developed by Melling Sportscars on Lola's behalf was ready for use.

Lola's Formula 1 project was poorly prepared and underfunded. At the opening race in Australia, the Lola drivers Vincenzo Sospiri and Ricardo Rosset missed qualifying under the 107 percent rule by 6 and 9 seconds respectively. At the subsequent race in Brazil, the cars still appeared in the pit lane, but they were not completed. After failing to qualify in Australia, Eric Broadley announced that he would immediately start designing a new car for Formula 1, but nothing came of it. Two days after the Australian race, sponsor Mastercard terminated the agreement with Lola, resulting in the bankruptcy of the racing team and parent company Lola Cars.

== Cosworth ED ==
The Cosworth ED (also called the Ford ED) was an eight-cylinder naturally aspirated engine designed by Cosworth for Formula 1, which was used at the beginning of the second 3.0-litre era from 1995 to 1997. It was purely a customer engine for smaller teams and in this function replaced the HB used until 1994, to which it was technically related. It was Cosworth's last eight-cylinder engine until the rule change in 2006. The ED was not competitive. It only scored three world championship points in three years.

=== Details ===
The development of the ED was led by Cosworth engineer Stewart Banks. While Cosworth had redesigned the works engine EC (or ECA) from scratch, the ED was a mere further development of the old customer engine HB.

The displacement of the ED was 2995 cm³. Cosworth did not provide precise information on the bore and stroke. The ED was an eight-cylinder V-engine with a cylinder bank angle of 75 degrees. Each bank of cylinders had two overhead camshafts. There were two intakes and two exhaust valves for each cylinder, which were reset pneumatically. At 595 mm, the ED was just as long as the HB, but 15 mm shorter than the EC, which had a comparatively large bore and was therefore longer. The overall height of the ED (542 mm) exceeded that of the compact EC by 27 mm and that of the HB by 20 mm. Although Cosworth also used expensive materials such as titanium, magnesium, and plastics for the ED, its weight was 500 grams more than the EC. The electronics came regularly from Cosworth. The only difference was for the engines intended for Minardi: they received control electronics from Magneti Marelli. Minardi's engines were therefore also referred to internally as EDM. The power output of the ED was low. Initially, they produced between 580 and 590 hp, this being a substantially lower specific output than the previous 725hp 3.5 litre HB. Scaling the capacity reduction from HB to EC gives an expected power of over 620hp. This made them the weakest engines in the starting field. They remained so until the end of 1997, even if output increased gradually over the next few years.

=== Stages of development ===
Five versions of the Cosworth ED were made from 1995 to 1997:

==== ED1 (1995) ====
The basic version, retrospectively designated the ED1, was in service with all customer teams (Forti, Minardi, Pacific, and Simtek) throughout the 1995 season. During that year, Cosworth brought no further developments.

==== ED2 (1996) ====
At the beginning of the 1996 season, the first expansion stage of the ED appeared. Dubbed the ED2 in-house, the engine produced 15 hp more than the base 1995 version, but it was still the weakest powerplant that season. The next least powerful engine, the Hart 830 used by Arrows, achieved 620 hp, while Tyrrell's OX11A-V10 from Yamaha achieved 650 hp, as did the new Cosworth ten-cylinder engine used by Sauber. All other Formula 1 engines now had more than 700 hp, Renault's RS8 even 750 hp. The ED2 only drove at Minardi.

==== ED3 (1996) ====
The further developed version ED3 appeared at the Spanish Grand Prix in 1996. The main difference to the ED2 was a speed limit raised to 14,500 rpm. The ED3 was used exclusively by Minardi.

==== ED4 (1997) ====
The ED4 was the base version of the Cosworth customer engine for the 1997 season. Minardi had already tested the ED4 in early October 1996, but did not race it during the 1996 season. The ED4 was only driven by Tyrrell.

==== ED5 (1997) ====
The last version of the ED range was the ED5, which appeared at the 1997 Spanish Grand Prix. With it came significant modifications. Although the engine block remained unchanged, the cylinder head, all moving parts, and the ancillaries were new. According to the factory, the engine was 20 kg lighter than the ED4, had 20 hp more power, and now reached 15,000 revolutions per minute. This version was only released by Tyrrell.

== Racing inserts ==
=== 1995: Forti Corse ===
After many years of success in Formula 3000, the Forti Corse team from Alessandria made its Formula 1 debut in 1995. The Formula 1 commitment was essentially based on the payments made by the Brazilian sponsors brokered by Pedro Diniz. The team competed in 1995 with the ED1 customer engine and chassis FG01, which harked back to the 1992 Fondmetal GR02 and was 60 kg over the minimum permitted weight. In the first races of the year, the Forti pilots regularly started from the back row; only during the summer, when the financially troubled Pacific team inexperienced pay driver allowed Diniz and his teammate Roberto Moreno to occasionally qualify for the penultimate row. Diniz finished ten times and Moreno eight times over the course of the season. The team's best finish was Diniz's seventh-place finish at the final race of the year in Australia. However, the Forti was extremely slow in the races. The Forti drivers were each lapped several times; usually, they were five or six rounds behind the winner, in Argentina even nine. On the one hand, the low speeds were due to the uncompetitive package of car and engine; on the other hand, team boss Guido FortiIn the first season, the focus was on reliability in order to gain experience by racing as many laps as possible. Forti came under criticism. With explicit reference to Forti Corse, the FIA introduced the 107 percent rule at the beginning of the 1996 season in order to exclude cars or drivers that were too slow from participating in the race during qualifying. In 1996, Forti switched to ECA customer engines, which, however, were hardly more powerful than the ED engines. The team had to stop racing in the summer of 1996 due to financial difficulties.

=== 1995: Pacific ===
British team Pacific, like Forti Corse, had its roots in Formula 3000. In 1994, Pacific debuted in Formula using a three-year-old Reynard chassis and a 1992- stage Ilmor ten-cylinder engine, serviced at Mader 1. Pacific was the weakest team this year. It failed to achieve a finish. Both drivers failed to qualify at every race from the French Grand Prix until the end of the season. For 1995, Pacific switched to Cosworth ED1 custom engines. The PR02 chassis was a new design by Frank Coppuck. The car was said to have significant aerodynamic problems that the team was unable to fix due to a lack of funds for testing. Pacific began the season with drivers Andrea Montermini and Bertrand Gachot. When the financial situation became difficult during the course of the year, pay drivers Giovanni Lavaggi and Jean-Denis Delétraz took over the cockpit for individual races from Gachot, who was co-owner of the team. Pacific's second season was again unsuccessful: there were 16 defects, eight accidents, one retirement, and one disqualification. Once Gachot couldn't start because of gearbox problems, and once they weren't classified because they were far behind. However, it is doubtful whether all the failures were actually due to technical reasons. Andrea Montermini later explained that his duties were often due to the team's financial needs: Since Pacific had no money for regular engine overhauls, he was instructed to only do a few laps in the races and then give up, in order to extend the life of the engines to stretch. At the end of the season, as in the previous year, the team had not scored a point in the constructors' championship. For 1996, Pacific endeavored with John Judd around Yamaha customer engines. However, this did not happen because the team could not budget for another Formula 1 season and instead returned to the Formula 3000 championship in 1996.

=== 1995: Simtek ===
The British design office Simtek, which had been developing Formula 1 cars for BMW, Andrea Moda, and Bravo on the commission since 1991, made its debut in Formula 1 together with Pacific in 1994. In the team's third race at Imola, Roland Ratzenberger was fatal in a Simtek S941 crashed. As the 1994 season progressed, the team, with changing drivers, managed to control competitor Pacific. However, Simtek did not achieve world championship points. In 1995 Simtek switched from Cosworth HB to ED1 engines, which were used in the S951, an evolution of last year's chassis. The rear axle and gearbox were purchased from Benetton; they corresponded to the designs of last year Benetton B194. The Simtek was considered the most competitive car with an ED customer engine at the start of the 1995 season, which was also superior to the Minardi M195. Driver Jos Verstappen, who was also Benetton's test pilot, was able to regularly qualify for the middle grid positions and compete with the middle field during the race phases despite numerous failures. At the Monaco Grand Prix, team boss Nick Wirth announced the imminent insolvency of the racing team. Because no other sponsors were found, the team skipped the subsequent race in Canada and filed for bankruptcy.

=== 1995 and 1996: Minardi ===
The Italian team Minardi used Cosworth HB customer engines in 1993 and 1994. In 1993 the engines came from Tom Walkinshaw Racing, in 1994 they came directly from Cosworth. For the 1995 season, Minardi had signed a contract with Mugen for ten-cylinder engines, which, however, was not implemented. Tom Walkinshaw, now the owner of Équipe Ligier, convinced Mugen to supply the engines to Ligier instead of Minardi, so Minardi had to switch to Cosworth ED engines at short notice in the winter of 1994/1995. Minardi filed a breach of contract suit but ultimately dropped it after Walkinshaw himself took action against Minardi over unpaid bills dating back to 1993 and at the French Grand Prix 1995 Minardi's racing car had been confiscated. As part of an out-of-court settlement, Minardi received $3.5 million in compensation from Mugen, which did not even cover the cost of leasing the 1995 ED engines.

In 1995, Minardi was the best ED customer team for the year but fell behind midfield teams like Tyrrell-Yamaha and Arrows-Hart. Pierluigi Martini, who contested his last Formula 1 race here, came seventh twice in the Minardi M195, his successor Pedro Lamy scored Minardi's only world championship point in Australia. Luca Badoer, the second driver, achieved two finishes in eighth place as best results. In the other races, there were a number of technical failures. Minardi finished tenth in the Constructors' Championship behind Tyrrell and Arrows, who each scored five points.

After Giancarlo Minardi's hopes for a customer engine from Ferrari had been shattered, his team came back in 1996 with ED engines. Minardi was the only ED customer team that year. The competitor Forti instead used the more expensive and renowned, but actually not more powerful "Zetec-R" engines of the ECA series. At the beginning of the season, Minardi received the ED2; the further developed version ED3 appeared in the spring. In the fall, Minardi finally tested the ED4, which was also used in practice for the Australian Grand Prix but was not used in the race. The car used was the M195B, a slightly revised version of the previous year's car. Minardi's regular driver Pedro Lamy failed in eight of 16 races; his best finish was ninth at Imola. The second car was driven alternately by the debutants Giancarlo Fisichella and Tarso Marques as well as Giovanni Lavaggi, who, like last year at Pacific, bought into the team and kept the racing team alive with his payments. In 1996, Minardi scored no World Championship points. The team finished 10th in the constructors' championship. Direct competitors Arrows and Tyrrell were ahead of Minardi by one and five points, respectively. For the 1997 season, the team switched to Hart eight-cylinder engines.

=== 1997: Tyrrell ===
In 1997, the traditional British racing team Tyrrell 1997 was the only team that used ED customer engines. The revival of the relationship with Cosworth, which ended in 1990, had become necessary because Tyrrell's previous engine partner Yamaha had entered into an exclusive association with Arrows for 1997. Although Tyrrell tried to customer versions of Cosworth's ten-cylinder engines that ran as factory engines this year at the newly formed Team Stewart Grand Prix; its owner Jackie Stewart, who had become world champion driver three times with Tyrrell from 1969 to 1973, however, refused to pass on the ten-cylinder. At the start of the season, Tyrrell received the ED4 version, which was heavier and weaker than last year's Yamaha engine, and from the Spanish Grand Prix onwards the lighter and slightly more powerful ED5 version appeared. For Tyrrell, the switch to ED engines meant not only the sporting setback but also a financial burden, because while Yamaha had supplied the engines free of charge up to 1996, Tyrrell had to pay around US$ 5.5 million for Cosworth's eight-cylinder in 1997. Tyrrell used the 025 designed by Harvey Postlethwaite that year, based on the previous 024 and was mechanically limited to changes necessitated by the installation of the larger and heavier engine. The team tried to compensate for the weaknesses of the chassis and engine with aerodynamic innovations. The most striking feature was the X-Wings or X-Towers so-called air deflectors, which were attached to the side pods at the level of the cockpit and stood on struts. They appeared at most races and were copied by almost every team throughout the year. 1997 was largely unsuccessful for Tyrrell. The drivers Mika Salo and Jos Verstappen managed to outperform the Stewart team's new cars in qualifying at least in a few races at the start of the season (e.g. in Australia and Spain ); all in all, Tyrrell was all about staying ahead of the Minardi. World Championship points were only awarded under the special circumstances of the rainy Monaco Grand Prix, which Salo finished without refueling (for the first time since refueling stops were reintroduced in 1994) and finished fifth thanks to the time advantage. At the end of the season, Tyrrell finished 10th in the constructors' championship with two points, ahead of Minardi and Lola. In 1998, the team competed with customer versions of Cosworth's ten-cylinder engine.
