= 1995 Formula One World Championship =

49th season of FIA Formula One motor racing

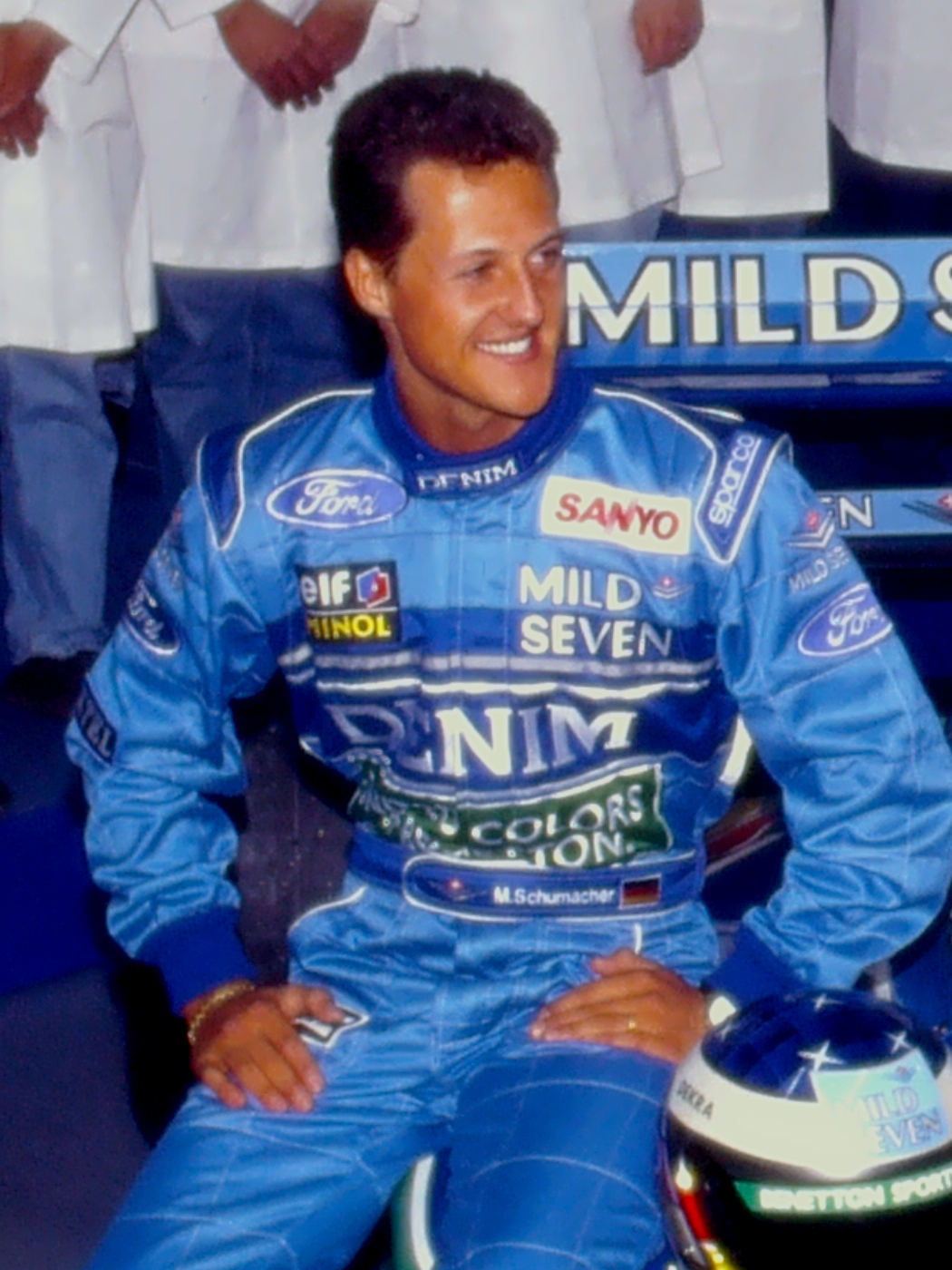
Michael Schumacher (pictured in 1994) won a second consecutive title with Benetton in his last year with the team.

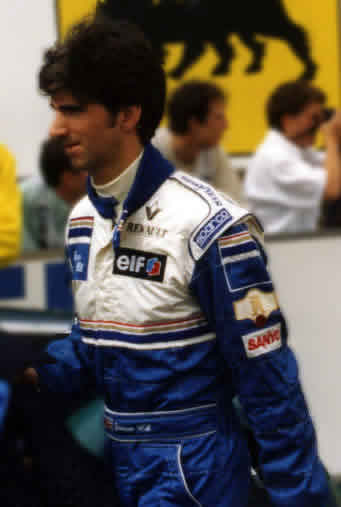
Damon Hill finished as runner-up 33 points behind with Williams.

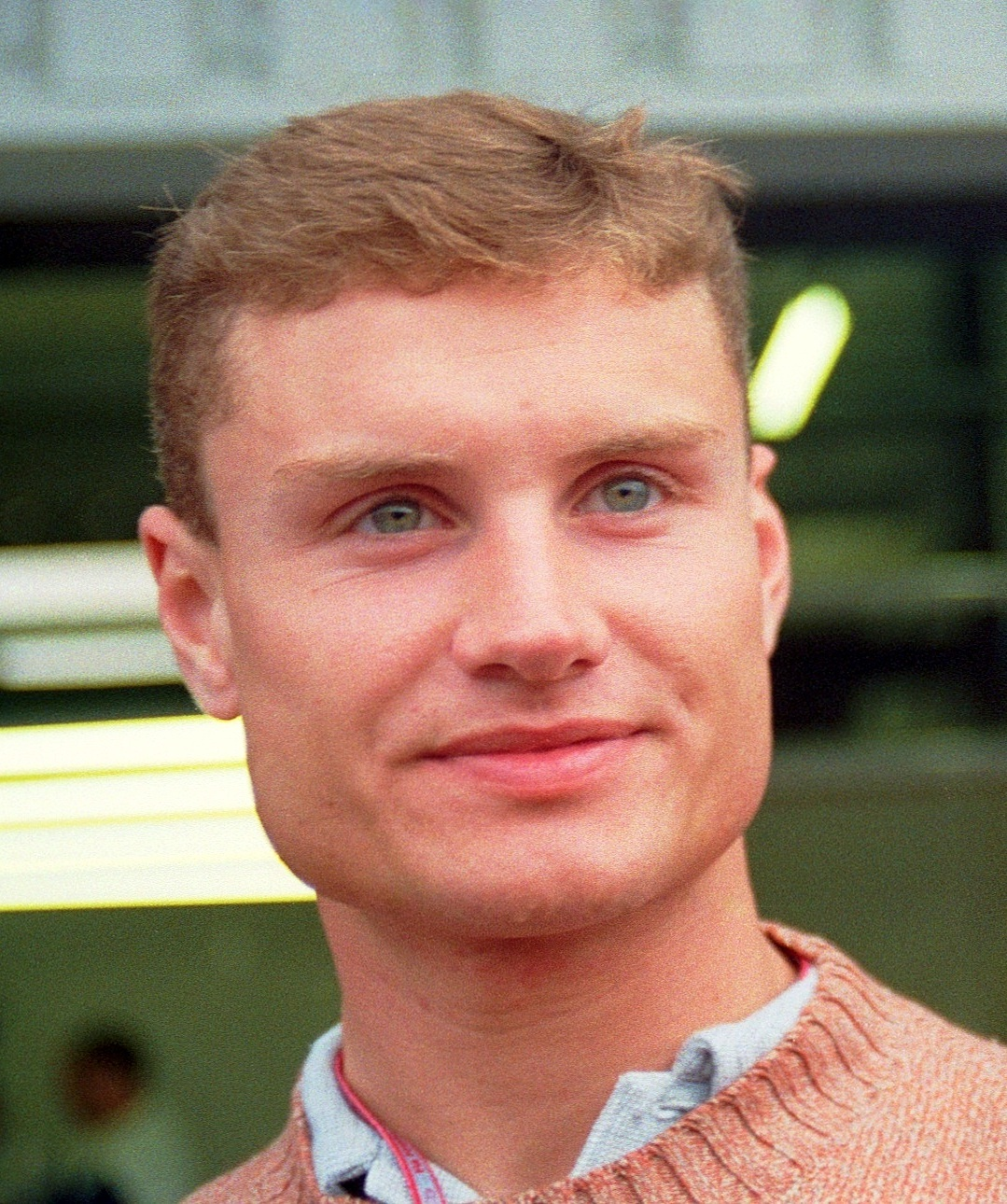
Hill's teammate, David Coulthard, finished the season ranked third, scoring his 1st win.

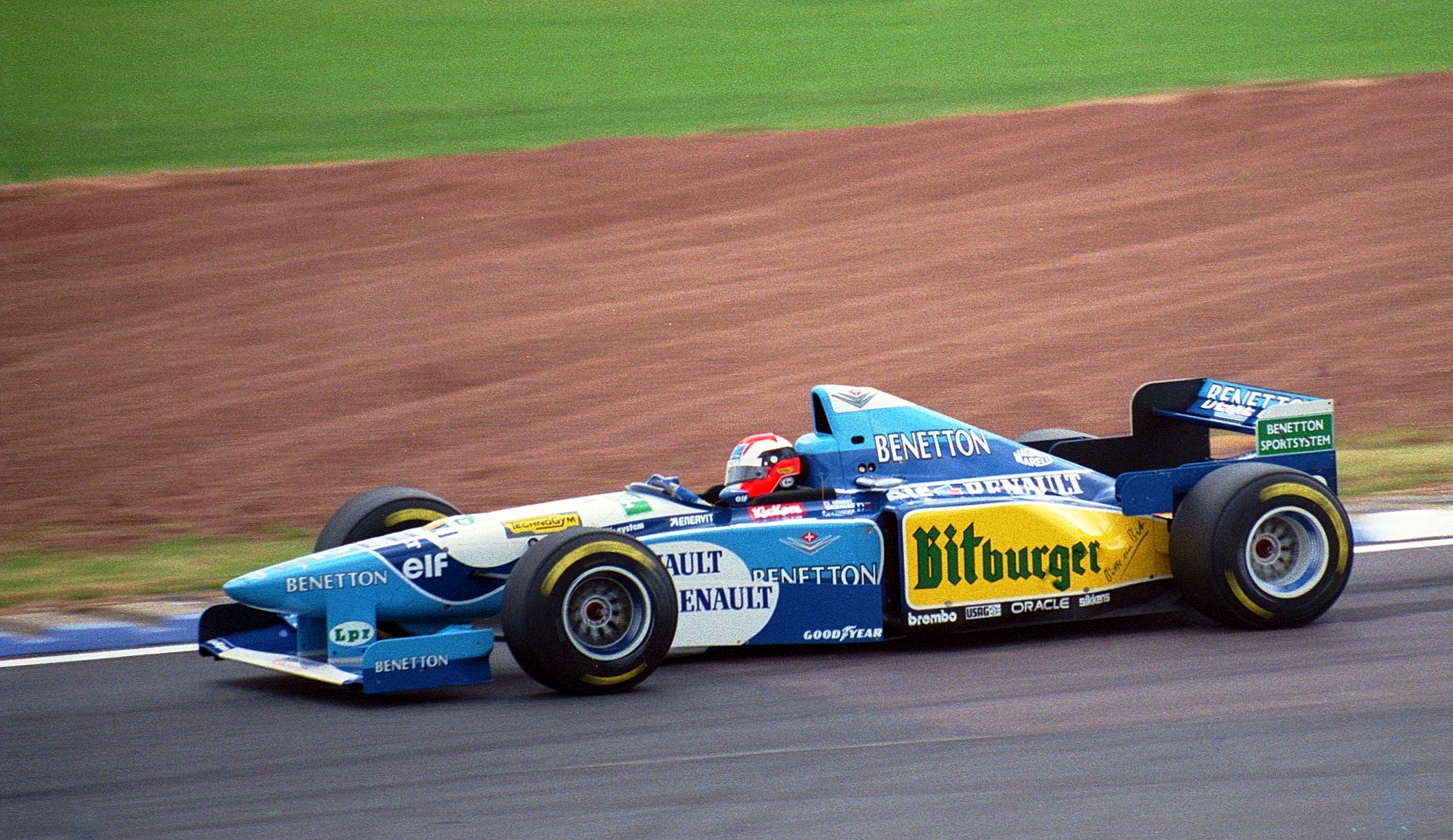
Benetton-Renault won the Consturctors' Championship with the B195.

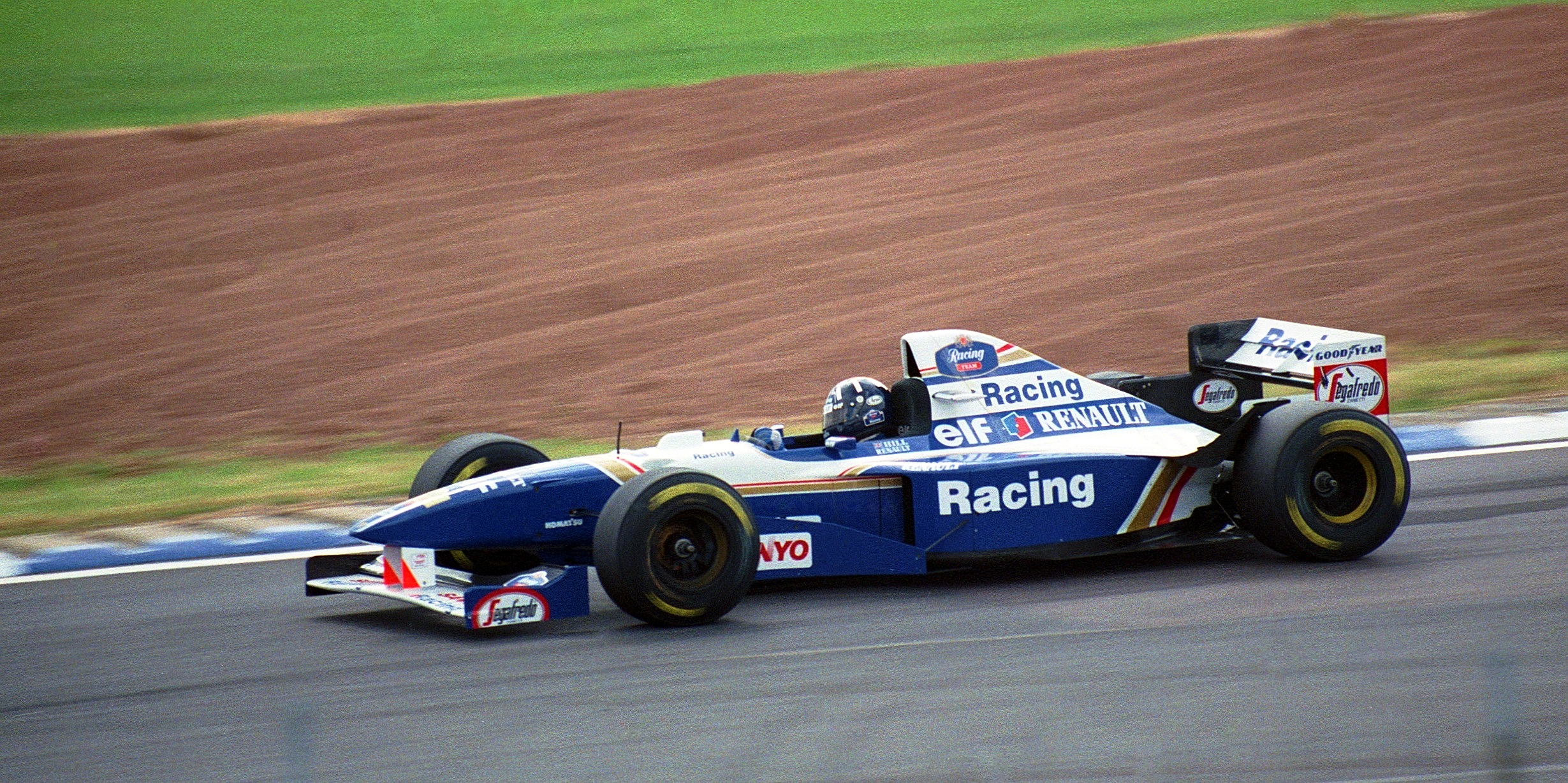
Williams's constant issues cost them both championships. They finished second in the Constructors' Championship with the FW17 and FW17B.

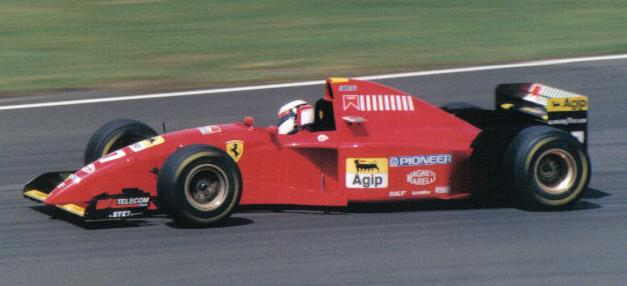
Ferrari finished third with the 412T2, the last V12-powered car in F1 history.

The 1995 FIA Formula One World Championship was the 49th season of FIA Formula One motor racing. It featured the 1995 Formula One World Championship for Drivers and the 1995 Formula One World Championship for Constructors, which were contested concurrently over a seventeen-race series that commenced on 26 March and ended on 12 November.

Michael Schumacher won his second consecutive Drivers' Championship, and Benetton won the Constructors' Championship, the first and only Constructors' title for the Benetton team. Schumacher won nine races en route to the championship, equalling the record set by Nigel Mansell in 1992. He also continued his rivalry with Williams-Renault driver Damon Hill, including collisions at the British and Italian Grands Prix.

Both those races were won by Schumacher's teammate Johnny Herbert, taking his first two F1 victories. Hill's Williams teammate, David Coulthard, claimed his first victory in Portugal, while Ferrari's Jean Alesi achieved his only F1 victory in Canada. Just like Honda in 1988, Renault engines won all but one race in this season.

1995 was also the last season in which the numbering system introduced in 1974 was used. From 1996 car numbers would generally be allocated based on the Constructors' Championship order of the previous season. This was also the first season of new 3 litre engine Formula and last season in which a V12 engine would race in Formula One. Ferrari, the only team racing with V12 in 1995, would switch to using a V10 engine for 1996. This was also the last season during which 1992 champion Nigel Mansell competed as he left the sport once more after a shambolic short-lived two-race stint with McLaren which saw him initially unable to fit comfortably in the Woking team's MP4-10 car during pre-season requiring a wider cockpit to be built to suit Mansell which in turn delayed his debut for the team until the third round of the season at Imola before quitting the team after struggling further at the following round in Spain. Mansell would never race in the sport again thereafter.

This was also the first season featuring 17 races since 1977.

== Drivers and constructors ==
The following teams and drivers competed in the 1995 FIA Formula One World Championship. All teams competed with tyres supplied by Goodyear.

Entrant	Constructor	Chassis	Engine	No	Driver	Rounds
(United Kingdom) Mild Seven Benetton Renault	Benetton-Renault	B195	Renault RS7 3.0 V10	1	(Germany) Michael Schumacher	All
(United Kingdom) Mild Seven Benetton Renault	Benetton-Renault	B195	Renault RS7 3.0 V10	2	(United Kingdom) Johnny Herbert	All
(United Kingdom) Nokia Tyrrell Yamaha	Tyrrell-Yamaha	023	Yamaha OX10C 3.0 V10	3	(Japan) Ukyo Katayama	1–13, 15–17
(United Kingdom) Nokia Tyrrell Yamaha	Tyrrell-Yamaha	023	Yamaha OX10C 3.0 V10	3	(Italy) Gabriele Tarquini	14
(United Kingdom) Nokia Tyrrell Yamaha	Tyrrell-Yamaha	023	Yamaha OX10C 3.0 V10	4	(Finland) Mika Salo	All
(United Kingdom) Rothmans Williams Renault	Williams-Renault	FW17; FW17B	Renault RS7 3.0 V10	5	(United Kingdom) Damon Hill	All
(United Kingdom) Rothmans Williams Renault	Williams-Renault	FW17; FW17B	Renault RS7 3.0 V10	6	(United Kingdom) David Coulthard	All
(United Kingdom) Marlboro McLaren Mercedes	McLaren-Mercedes	MP4/10; MP4/10B; MP4/10C	Mercedes FO 110 3.0 V10	7	(United Kingdom) Mark Blundell	1–2, 5–17
(United Kingdom) Marlboro McLaren Mercedes	McLaren-Mercedes	MP4/10; MP4/10B; MP4/10C	Mercedes FO 110 3.0 V10	7	(United Kingdom) Nigel Mansell	3–4
(United Kingdom) Marlboro McLaren Mercedes	McLaren-Mercedes	MP4/10; MP4/10B; MP4/10C	Mercedes FO 110 3.0 V10	8	(Finland) Mika Häkkinen	1–14, 16–17
(United Kingdom) Marlboro McLaren Mercedes	McLaren-Mercedes	MP4/10; MP4/10B; MP4/10C	Mercedes FO 110 3.0 V10	8	(Denmark) Jan Magnussen	15
(United Kingdom) Footwork Hart	Footwork-Hart	FA16	Hart 830 3.0 V8	9	(Italy) Gianni Morbidelli	1–7, 15–17
(United Kingdom) Footwork Hart	Footwork-Hart	FA16	Hart 830 3.0 V8	9	(Italy) Massimiliano Papis	8–14
(United Kingdom) Footwork Hart	Footwork-Hart	FA16	Hart 830 3.0 V8	10	(Japan) Taki Inoue	All
(United Kingdom) MTV Simtek Ford (Note: The Simtek team withdrew from the championship after the Monaco Grand Prix.)	Simtek-Ford	S951	Ford-Cosworth EDB1 3.0 V8	11	(Italy) Domenico Schiattarella	1–5
(United Kingdom) MTV Simtek Ford	Simtek-Ford	S951	Ford-Cosworth EDB1 3.0 V8	12	(Netherlands) Jos Verstappen	1–5
(Republic of Ireland) Total Jordan Peugeot	Jordan-Peugeot	195	Peugeot A10 3.0 V10	14	(Brazil) Rubens Barrichello	All
(Republic of Ireland) Total Jordan Peugeot	Jordan-Peugeot	195	Peugeot A10 3.0 V10	15	(United Kingdom) Eddie Irvine	All
(United Kingdom) Pacific Team Lotus	Pacific-Ford	PR02	Ford-Cosworth EDC1 3.0 V8	16	(France) Bertrand Gachot	1–8, 15–17
(United Kingdom) Pacific Team Lotus	Pacific-Ford	PR02	Ford-Cosworth EDC1 3.0 V8	16	(Italy) Giovanni Lavaggi	9–12
(United Kingdom) Pacific Team Lotus	Pacific-Ford	PR02	Ford-Cosworth EDC1 3.0 V8	16	(Switzerland) Jean-Denis Delétraz	13–14
(United Kingdom) Pacific Team Lotus	Pacific-Ford	PR02	Ford-Cosworth EDC1 3.0 V8	17	(Italy) Andrea Montermini	All
(France) Junior Larrousse F1 (Note: Despite being on the entry list, the Larrousse team did not contest any races.)	Larrousse-Ford	LH95	Ford ED 3.0 V8	19	(France) Christophe Bouchut	None
(France) Junior Larrousse F1	Larrousse-Ford	LH95	Ford ED 3.0 V8	20	(France) Éric Bernard	None
(Italy) Parmalat Forti Ford	Forti-Ford	FG01	Ford-Cosworth EDD1 3.0 V8	21	(Brazil) Pedro Diniz	All
(Italy) Parmalat Forti Ford	Forti-Ford	FG01	Ford-Cosworth EDD1 3.0 V8	22	(Brazil) Roberto Moreno	All
(Italy) Minardi Scuderia Italia	Minardi-Ford	M195	Ford-Cosworth EDM1 3.0 V8	23	(Italy) Pierluigi Martini	1–9
(Italy) Minardi Scuderia Italia	Minardi-Ford	M195	Ford-Cosworth EDM1 3.0 V8	23	(Portugal) Pedro Lamy	10–17
(Italy) Minardi Scuderia Italia	Minardi-Ford	M195	Ford-Cosworth EDM1 3.0 V8	24	(Italy) Luca Badoer	All
(France) Ligier Gitanes Blondes	Ligier-Mugen-Honda	JS41	Mugen-Honda MF-301 3.0 V10	25	(Japan) Aguri Suzuki	1–3, 9, 15–16
(France) Ligier Gitanes Blondes	Ligier-Mugen-Honda	JS41	Mugen-Honda MF-301 3.0 V10	25	(United Kingdom) Martin Brundle	4–8, 10–14, 17
(France) Ligier Gitanes Blondes	Ligier-Mugen-Honda	JS41	Mugen-Honda MF-301 3.0 V10	26	(France) Olivier Panis	All
(Italy) Scuderia Ferrari	Ferrari	412T2	Ferrari Tipo 044/1 3.0 V12	27	(France) Jean Alesi	All
(Italy) Scuderia Ferrari	Ferrari	412T2	Ferrari Tipo 044/1 3.0 V12	28	(Austria) Gerhard Berger	All
(Switzerland) Red Bull Sauber Ford	Sauber-Ford	C14	Ford ECA Zetec-R 3.0 V8	29	(Austria) Karl Wendlinger	1–4, 16–17
(Switzerland) Red Bull Sauber Ford	Sauber-Ford	C14	Ford ECA Zetec-R 3.0 V8	29	(France) Jean-Christophe Boullion	5–15
(Switzerland) Red Bull Sauber Ford	Sauber-Ford	C14	Ford ECA Zetec-R 3.0 V8	30	(Germany) Heinz-Harald Frentzen	All

=== Background ===
There was a threat of a drivers' strike over the terms of the 1995 Fédération Internationale de l'Automobile (FIA) Super Licences, which allowed the FIA to demand promotional appearances and forbade the drivers from criticising the championship. This was resolved by the governing body prior to the race, ensuring full driver participation.

=== Team changes ===
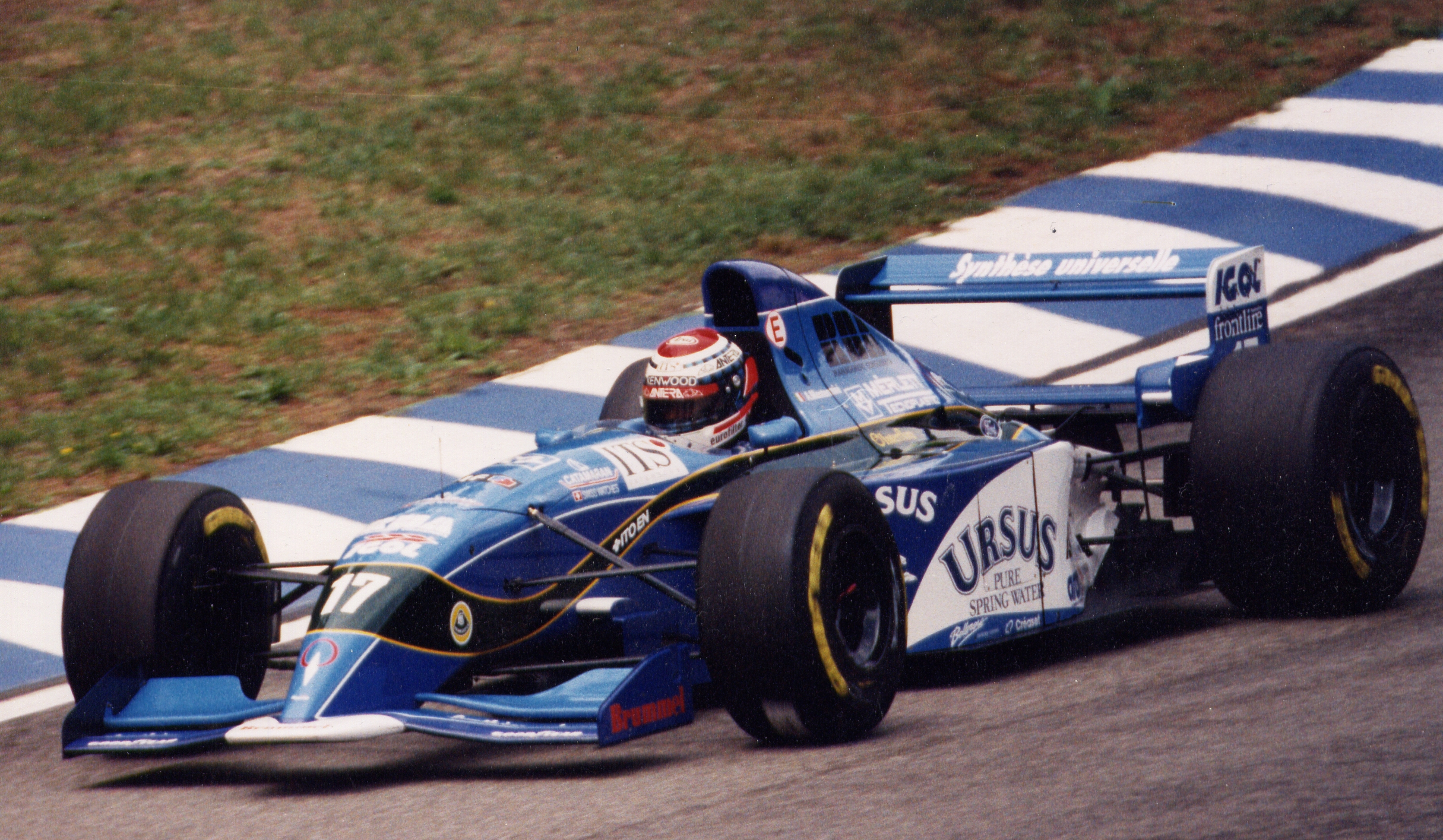
Andrea Montermini, driving for Pacific Team Lotus

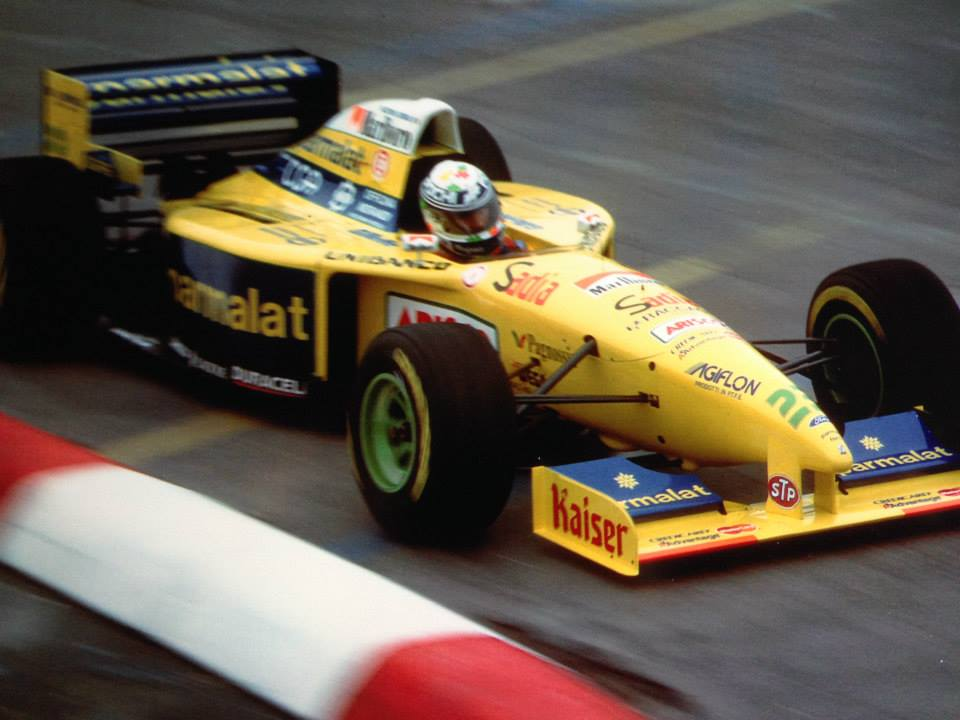
Vittorio Zoboli, test driver for Forti in 1995

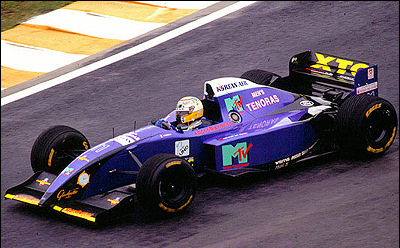
1995 was the last year for team Simtek

- At the end of the 1994 season, Team Lotus left F1 after 36 years in the sport, winning 6 Drivers' and 7 Constructors' Championships, with the team ceasing operations in January 1995. Shortly before the team closed doors, the team's assets were bought by David Hunt, brother of 1976 Formula One champion James Hunt, who later announced that the Lotus name would be used by Pacific Grand Prix under the name Pacific Team Lotus.
- The Larrousse team, with drivers Éric Bernard and Christophe Bouchut, failed to turn up for any of the on-track sessions. With French government aid not forthcoming, the team ran out of money. And with a 1995 chassis not yet built, team owner Gérard Larrousse elected to miss the first two rounds of the season in the hope of competing from the San Marino Grand Prix onwards. No funding ever arrived and it was too late for them to build a car for the season. There were talks with the DAMS Formula 3000 team, but Jean-Paul Driot, boss of DAMS, wanted to buy Larrousse and run the team themselves. After a sponsor deal with Malaysian oil company Petronas also fell through, Driot announced on 13 February that they had abandoned plans to enter F1 for 1995. He intended to return to Formula 3000 and prepare for an F1 bid in 1996.
- Formula 3000 team Forti made the step up to Formula One, with their Forti FG01 being the last F1 car to use a manual gearbox.
- The status and the ownership of Ligier was under scrutiny. When Martin Brundle signed with them for 1995, rumours spread that Tom Walkinshaw would take up the function of team boss, since Brundle and Walkinshaw had many successful collaborations in the past. Walkinshaw worked for Benetton in 1994 as Engineering Director), but when that team was found to use an illegal fuel filter at the German Grand Prix, they were let off the hook, after promising to fire Walkinshaw and implementing major changes within the team. On the side of Benetton, this deal was negotiated by Flavio Briatore. However, since he was also the owner of Ligier, it seemed more like a promotion for Walkinshaw, albeit with a smaller team. Furthermore, rivals compared the Ligier JS41 to the Benetton B195, the only apparent difference being the engine in each car. Commenting on the design similarities, Walkinshaw said:

Mechanically it [the JS41] is totally different [from the B195] and structurally it is quite different as well. Aerodynamically, it's as close as we can make it to being the same. I don't know how you would end up with anything else if you take a core of engineers who have been working on the Benetton. Of course the damn thing looks the same. But if you go into the detail of the car, there is nothing interchangeable.

- The 1995 season saw a major reshuffle among the engine suppliers: Benetton ended their 7-year association with Ford Motor Company by switching to the Renault RS7 engines (which were the same used by Renault's business partner Williams F1 team). The contract with Ford was taken up by Sauber and they parted ways with long time partner Mercedes-Benz. McLaren then offered a new home for the Mercedes engine supplier, ending their relationship with Peugeot after just one season. Jordan took on the Peugeot engine deal, replacing their Hart contract. And so, finally, the Hart company moved teams to Footwork Arrows. After four years as an independent engine supplier, Ilmor eventually shifted focus to trusted engine designer, builder, assembler and tuner to Mercedes-Benz High Performance Engines despite the partnership started from 1994 season onwards.
- Pacific Racing replaced their 1993-spec Ilmor engines for customer Ford EDC engines.
- Minardi had been expected to run with Mugen-Honda engines, but at the last minute, Ligier boss Flavio Briatore persuaded the Japanese engine supplier to supply his team, leaving Minardi in a mess. Their M195 was designed for the Mugen-Honda V10 and parts were already being made. The team then had to work flat out to build a brand new car with a Ford ED engine, tuned by Magneti Marelli. Team owner Giancarlo Minardi announced he was taking legal action against the Japanese supplier.
- The Simtek team went bankrupt on 1 June, after the fifth race of the season.

=== Driver changes ===
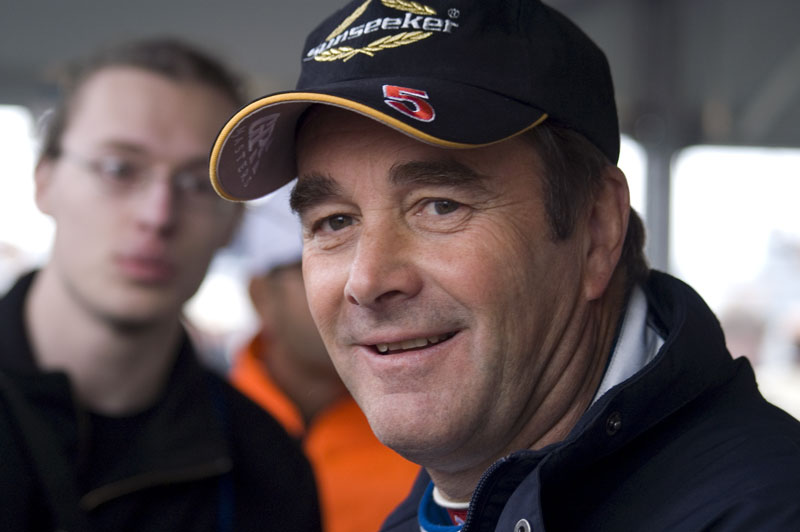
Nigel Mansell retired from Formula One after 15 seasons.

- On 28 October 1994, Ligier issued a press release stating that Olivier Panis and Johnny Herbert were going to be their official drivers for all of the 1995 season. However, at the end of January, they announced that Herbert was no longer at the team, joining Benetton instead, and that Aguri Suzuki and Martin Brundle would share the second seat. The announcement came as a big shock to Suzuki and his Japanese backers, who believed he had secured the Ligier seat for the whole season. During his "off" races, Brundle joined veteran commentator Murray Walker in the BBC commentary box. They later became commentators for ITV, after Brundle retired from F1 in 1996, and Brundle is now working for Sky Sports F1 alongside David Croft.
- After Ayrton Senna's passing, his seat at Williams had alternated between Nigel Mansell and David Coulthard. Mansell left the team at the beginning of January and Coulthard was offered a full-time drive.
- Mika Salo replaced Mark Blundell at Tyrrell, with Gabriele Tarquini now the team's test driver. Before being confirmed as race driver, Salo was involved in a contract dispute with the Pacific team. He had raced for Team Lotus in 1994 and was thought to be free when the team withdrew, until new owner David Hunt coupled the name with the Pacific team and insisted Salo was obliged to race for them. The Contract Recognition Board lawyers and Tyrrell representatives were astounded by Hunt, but announced on 13 February that it had ruled in favour of Tyrrell, because the Team Lotus which Salo had signed for was not the same Team Lotus which now claimed his services. Salo was unveiled as Tyrrell driver later that evening when they unveiled their 1995 car.
- Mark Blundell replaced fellow countryman Martin Brundle at McLaren. However, Nigel Mansell was in the McLaren seat from the San Marino Grand Prix. He had already been confirmed at the team when he left Williams, but he could not fit in the car. His deal was also dropped from $15 million to $10 million because Marlboro refused to pay his asking price. Mansell said that the 1995 season would almost certainly be his last in Formula One.
- Simtek brought in Jos Verstappen from Benetton instead of Hideki Noda, who was scheduled to be the team's first driver, but was not able to race, after the Great Hanshin earthquake resulted in a lack of personal funds, and was therefore relegated to share the second drive with Domenico Schiattarella. Noda ended up not driving for the team at all, as they went bankrupt after the Monaco round.
- New team Forti brought in veteran Roberto Moreno along with rookie Pedro Diniz. Diniz was partly selected as his family controls one of Brazil's largest food distribution companies.
- Christian Fittipaldi was replaced by Taki Inoue at Footwork.
- Pacific replaced Paul Belmondo with Andrea Montermini.
- Minardi replaced Michele Alboreto with Luca Badoer.

==== Mid-season changes ====
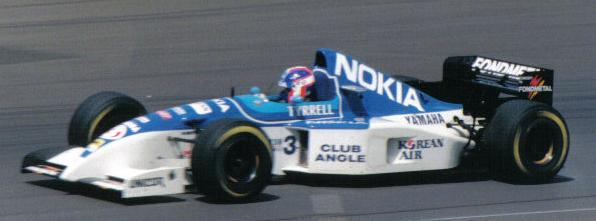
Tyrrell driver Ukyo Katayama (pictured during the British GP) was injured in Portugal and replaced by Gabriele Tarquini.

- Going into the Monaco Grand Prix, McLaren replaced Nigel Mansell with test driver Mark Blundell. At the same time, Karl Wendlinger's seat at Sauber was given to Williams test driver and reigning International Formula 3000 champion Jean-Christophe Boullion.
- From the British Grand Prix on, Footwork replaced Gianni Morbidelli with International Formula 3000 driver Massimiliano Papis, citing sponsorship reasons. Morbidelli would eventually return for the final three races of the season. Before that same weekend, Bertrand Gachot stepped away from driving duties with Pacific. The seat was temporarily filled by Giovanni Lavaggi and Jean-Denis Delétraz. The team tried to hire Katsumi Yamamoto and Oliver Gavin, but they were not granted their Super Licences, and Gachot returned for the last three races.
- Minardi replaced Pierluigi Martini with Pedro Lamy from the Hungarian Grand Prix onwards.
- After having done two years of touring car racing, Gabriele Tarquini made a one-off return to F1 when he filled in for Ukyo Katayama at the European Grand Prix, as the Japanese was still recovering from neck injuries and severe bruising sustained during a crash at the previous round in Portugal.
- Jan Magnussen was promoted from test driver at McLaren to replace Mika Häkkinen for the Pacific Grand Prix, due to the Finn suffering from appendicitis.

== Calendar ==
Round	Grand Prix	Circuit	Date
1	Brazilian Grand Prix	(Brazil) Autódromo José Carlos Pace, São Paulo	26 March
2	Argentine Grand Prix	(Argentina) Autódromo Oscar Alfredo Gálvez, Buenos Aires	9 April
3	San Marino Grand Prix	(Italy) Autodromo Enzo e Dino Ferrari, Imola	30 April
4	Spanish Grand Prix	(Spain) Circuit de Barcelona-Catalunya, Montmeló	14 May
5	Monaco Grand Prix	Circuit de Monaco, Monte Carlo	28 May
6	Canadian Grand Prix	(Canada) Circuit Gilles Villeneuve, Montreal	11 June
7	French Grand Prix	(France) Circuit de Nevers Magny-Cours, Magny-Cours	2 July
8	British Grand Prix	(United Kingdom) Silverstone Circuit, Silverstone	16 July
9	German Grand Prix	(Germany) Hockenheimring, Hockenheim	30 July
10	Hungarian Grand Prix	(Hungary) Hungaroring, Mogyoród	13 August
11	Belgian Grand Prix	(Belgium) Circuit de Spa-Francorchamps, Stavelot	27 August
12	Italian Grand Prix	(Italy) Autodromo Nazionale di Monza, Monza	10 September
13	Portuguese Grand Prix	(Portugal) Autódromo do Estoril, Estoril	24 September
14	European Grand Prix	(Germany) Nürburgring, Nürburg	1 October
15	Pacific Grand Prix	(Japan) TI Circuit, Aida	22 October (Note: The Pacific Grand Prix was originally due to take place on 16 April, but was postponed to 22 October due to the effects of the Great Hanshin earthquake in Japan.)
16	Japanese Grand Prix	(Japan) Suzuka Circuit, Suzuka	29 October
17	Australian Grand Prix	(Australia) Adelaide Street Circuit, Adelaide	12 November

=== Background ===
The calendar was initially announced at the beginning of 1995, but there were doubts over the selected dates:

- The Argentine Grand Prix was the only newly announced race, with it taking place at the Autódromo Oscar Alfredo Gálvez circuit. The circuit was due to begin the season on 12 March, but there were doubts over whether the circuit would be ready in time.
- The Second race in Japan on 16 April was also under threat, as the TI Circuit was badly affected after the Great Hanshin earthquake, which damaged local infrastructure.
- The San Marino round, Spanish round and the Italian round required safety upgrades. The Circuit de Catalunya was also in financial difficulty.

On 6 February, a revised calendar was announced. However, some tracks still needed clearance to race.

- The Argentine Grand Prix moved to 9 April, despite the fact it had now received official clearance from FIA safety inspector Roland Bruynseraede. It gave the honor of being the season opener to Brazil.
- The Pacific round was pushed back due to the earthquake, placing it just one week before the Japanese Grand Prix.
- The European Grand Prix was moved forward seven days, leading to another space in the schedule of just one week.

=== Calendar changes ===
- The Argentine Grand Prix returned after a fourteen-year absence.
- The Spanish Grand Prix and Monaco Grand Prix swapped places on the calendar so that the Monaco round follows the Spanish Grand Prix.
- The European Grand Prix moved from the Circuito Permanente de Jerez to the Nürburgring. (Note: All Formula One Grands Prix held at the Nürburgring since 1984 have used the 5 km (3.1 mi) long GP-Strecke and not the 21 km (13 mi) long Nordschleife, which was last used by Formula One in 1976.) It was the first time since 1985 that F1 raced there.

== Regulation changes ==
=== Regulations from 1994 ===
In the aftermath of the deaths of Roland Ratzenberger and Ayrton Senna, during the weekend of the 1994 San Marino Grand Prix, a number of regulation were implemented as of the 1994 German Grand Prix, intended to increase safety of the cars and to limit their performance. These regulations were formalised going into 1995:

- The rear wing could not extend forward of the rear wheel centreline and rear wing elements could only occupy 70% of the space between 60 centimetres (24 in) and 95 centimetres (37 in) above the ground.
- A 10 millimetres (0.39 in) thick skid block made of impregnated wood was affixed to the underside of every car and was permitted to wear by up to only 1 millimetre (0.039 in). This was done to force an increase in ride height and thus reduce ground effect advantages.

=== New regulations ===
More regulation changes followed before the start of the 1995 season:

==== Power ====
The allowed engine capacity was reduced to 3 litres (down from 3.5 litres) and the description for the type of fuel that was allowed was stringently specified, to reach an approximate 100 BHP reduction in power.

==== Aerodynamics ====
- The cars' ride height was raised by 50 millimetres (2.0 in).
- The flat-bottomed undertray which was made mandatory in 1983 was to now feature a large "stepped" section underneath each sidepod, raised about an inch higher and parallel to the wooden plank originally introduced in 1994.
- The rear wing could not extend more than 80 cm (31 in) above the "reference plane" (bottom of the car) - this used to be 95 cm (37 in).
- The front wing had to be at least 50 mm (2.0 in) above the bottom of the car, up from 40 mm (1.6 in).
- The maximum width of the rear diffuser was brought down from 100 cm (39 in) to 30 cm (12 in).
- The exclusion zones above the front and rear wheels, in which no wings or other body parts with aerodynamic influence could be placed, were extended.

All aerodynamic changes summed up were expected to reduce downforce by 30–40%.

==== Safety and other ====
- Cars had to have impact absorbing side structures, which would have to undergo impact tests.
- Frontal crash tests were now performed at 12 m/s (39 ft/s) instead of 11 m/s (36 ft/s).
- Cockpit openings had to be larger and feature better headrest installations.
- The survival cell had to extend higher alongside the driver.
- The minimum weight of the cars was increased from 515 kilograms (1,135 lb) to 525 kilograms (1,157 lb) to account for the new safety measures, and then increased to 595 kilograms (1,312 lb) to include the driver. Prior to the first session of the season, all of the drivers were weighed to establish a reference weight, to be used on occasions when the two were weighed separately, or if the driver was unavailable to be weighed. As such, a small competitive advantage could be established if the driver attempted to register a weight as heavy as possible before the season and then getting their weight down to lower the total weight of the car on track.

=== Other changes ===
Due to the demise of the Lotus team following the end of the 1994 season, the grid was reduced to 13 teams and 26 cars at the start of season - the same number as the maximum number of cars permitted to start a race. Therefore, every driver entered for a Grand Prix would be guaranteed a slot on the grid, with any withdrawals classed as non-starts rather than non-qualifications.

== Season review ==
=== Pre-season ===
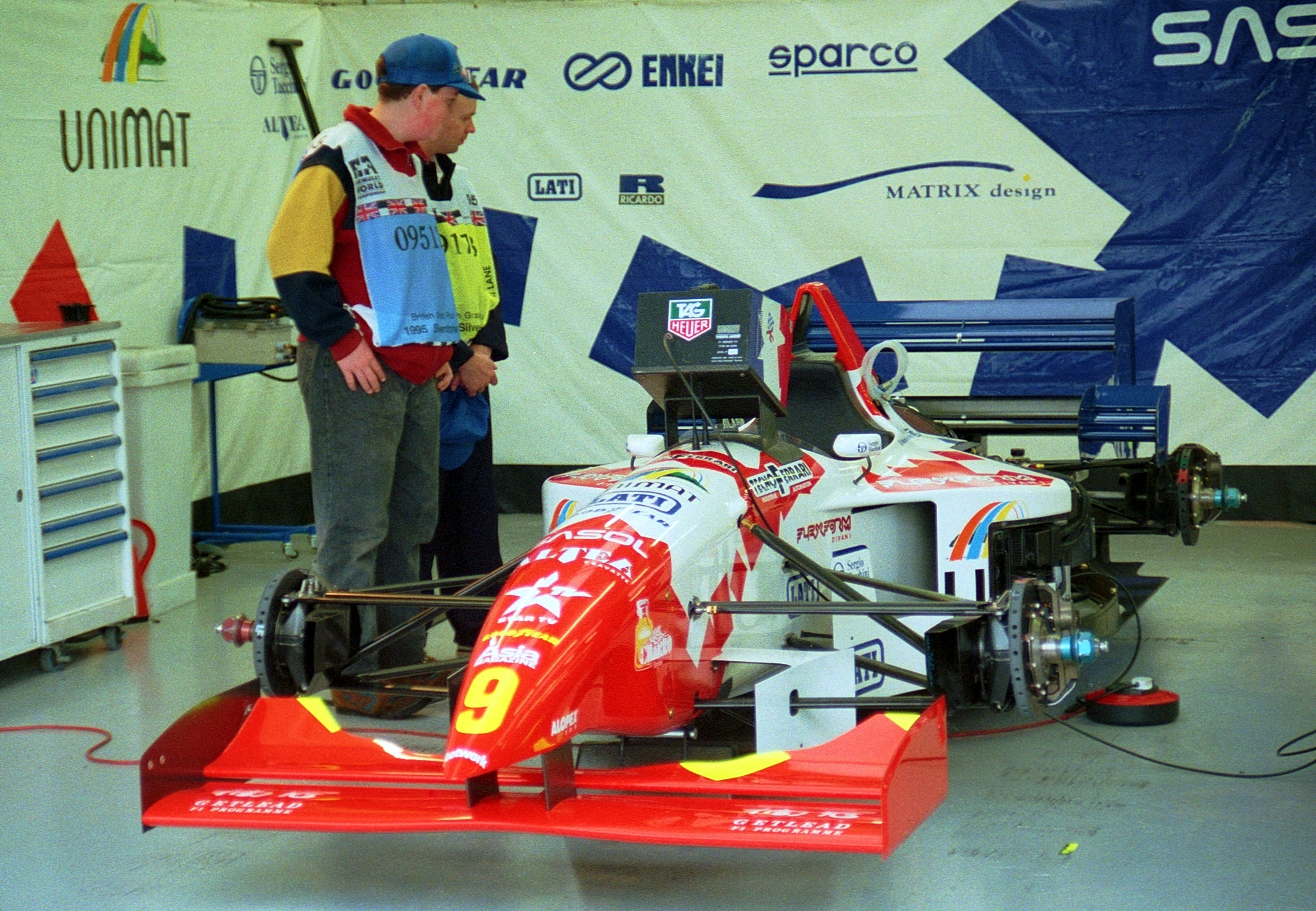
The Footwork FA16 during the 1995 British Grand Prix

The cars were still in various stages of development heading into the new season; the Footwork FA16 and Simtek S951 chassis arrived at the event with virtually no testing, having been completed shortly beforehand.

Luckily for them and other teams that were expected to be fighting over last places, the withdrawal of teams Larrousse and Lotus dropped the number of participating cars to 26, guaranteeing all entrants of a race start, without the threat of failing to qualify, for the first time since the 1994 Canadian Grand Prix.

At the front of the field, Michael Schumacher for Benetton and Damon Hill for Williams were the favourites to battle for the Drivers' Championship, with Schumacher anticipating a "struggle" for the championship. Bernard Dudot, Renault's Chief Engineer, said that he believed Benetton was less well-prepared than Williams, as the former team had just changed its engine supplier to Renault, whereas Williams had been in partnership with the company since 1989.

McLaren were concerned about the standard refuelling equipment provided for 1995 by suppliers Intertechnique, having suffered a major leak in a test of the new rig outside of its factory. Intertechnique had redesigned the fuel equipment, which was used by all of the teams, in the wake of the pit lane fire suffered by driver Jos Verstappen during the previous year's German Grand Prix. The new fuel rigs, in addition to being half the size of the 1994, also featured longer nozzles, and were designed to lock onto the car before any fuel could begin to flow. Intertechnique traced the problem to a faulty valve within the equipment, which caused 10 kilograms (22 lb) of fuel to leak, and modified the parts accordingly.

=== Rounds 1 to 4 ===
1994 runner-up Damon Hill for Williams achieved pole position for the first race of the season in Brazil. Champion Michael Schumacher lined up in second in his Benetton. Hill had a bad start and was immediately overtaken by Schumacher. They utilised different pit stop strategies and the battle was heating up until, on lap 31, the Williams driver spun off the track when his gearbox seized. Schumacher comfortably won the race ahead of Hill's teammate David Coulthard. Third place was contested by Mika Salo in the Tyrrell until he spun on lap 39, suffering from cramp in his hand, and was overtaken by Mika Häkkinen in the McLaren and the Ferraris of Gerhard Berger and Jean Alesi. After the second round pit stops, Berger took third place and stayed there.

After the race, Schumacher and Coulthard were both disqualified, as the fuel sample taken from their cars after qualifying did not match the regulations. All classified drivers moved up two places and Berger was declared the victor. However, a successful appeal by the two teams saw their drivers' results reinstated, since the illegal fuel did not offer a performance advantage. Still, the teams did not receive any points for the Constructors' Championship and were penalized $200,000. This division between car and driver was met with criticism.

For the second race in Argentina, Coulthard achieved pole position, the first of his career, with Hill and Schumacher behind him. The start saw collisions between eight drivers and the race was suspended. On lap six of the restarted race, Coulthard's throttle failed, allowing Schumacher and Hill past, and leading to the Scot's retirement shortly after. During the pit stops, Hill grabbed the lead and Alesi took second place. Schumacher finished third.

Before the race in San Marino, it was Benetton's Michael Schumacher on pole position for the first time this season. Berger started second, much to the joy of the local tifosi. Hill started in fourth. Light rain was falling and teams faced a difficult choice in tyres. The first five drivers on the grid started on rain tyres and, after the start, were five seconds per lap quicker than the rest of the field. Rubens Barrichello, the only other driver on wet tyres, started in tenth in his Jordan and quickly got up to sixth. Things turned out in the pit stops: Schumacher crashed, coming out on his cold tyres, and Berger's car stalled, giving the lead to Damon Hill. Coulthard and Alesi fought hard over then-second place, but the over-eager Williams driver exceeded the pit lane speed limit and had to undertake a 10-second stop-go penalties. The podium order was Hill, Alesi, Berger.

In Spain, it was Schumacher on pole for the second time and he led from start to finish. On the last lap, Hill was in second, but when he suffered from a hydraulic problem, he crawled across the line in fourth. This allowed Schumacher's teammate Johnny Herbert through to second place, his first ever podium. Berger finished third, while Alesi and Coulthard retired.

After four races, Schumacher in the Benetton led the Drivers' Championship with 24 points, just one ahead of Hill in the Williams. Alesi and Berger in the Ferrari followed with 14 and 13 points, respectively. In the Constructors' Championship, Ferrari (27) led Williams (26) and Benetton (23).

=== Rounds 5 to 10 ===
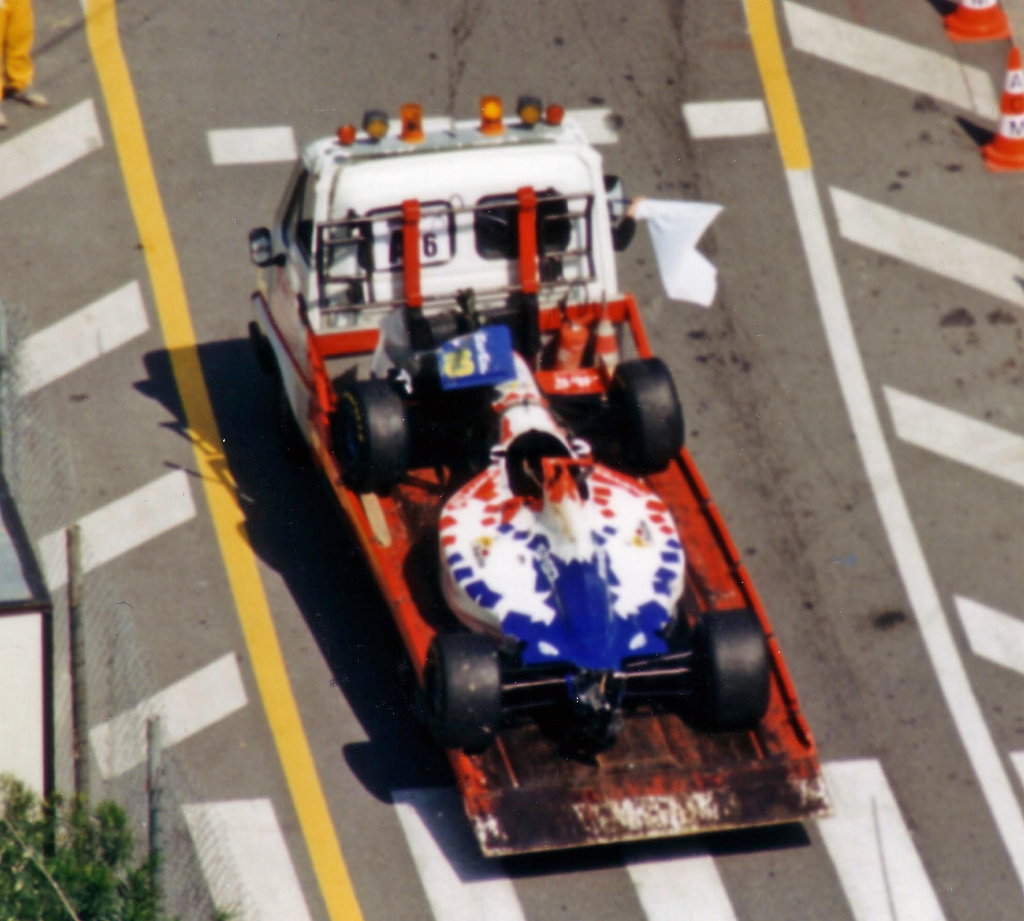
A bizarre incident in Saturday practice saw the Renault Clio safety car crash into Taki Inoue's stalled Footwork.

On the narrow streets of Monaco, Damon Hill for Williams qualified in pole position. Championship leader Michael Schumacher in the Benetton started next to him. David Coulthard (Williams), Gerhard Berger and Jean Alesi (both Ferrari) completed the top five, but the three collided going in the first corner. The track was blocked and the race was suspended. At the second start, the top drivers remained in order, but during the pit stops, Hill fell back behind Schumacher and Alesi. The Ferrari then crashed whilst attempting to avoid Martin Brundle, who had spun. Coulthard retired, so the top three at the finish was Schumacher, Hill, Berger.

This was the last race for the Simtek team, who withdrew from the championship because they ran out of budget.

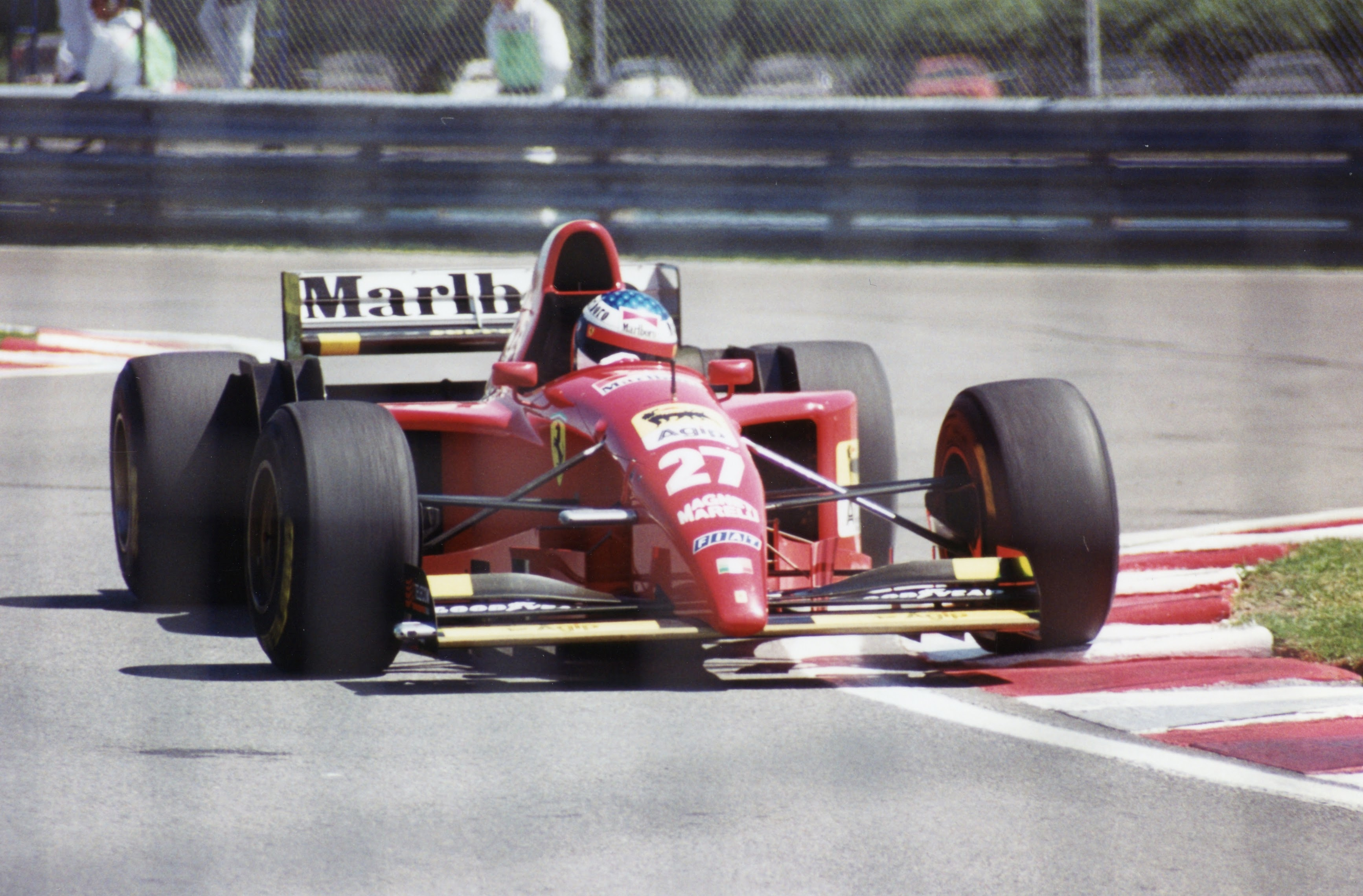
Jean Alesi (Ferrari won the 1995 Canadian Grand Prix

In Canada, Michael Schumacher achieved pole position, the 100th for a Renault-powered F1 car, and led away comfortably, until on lap 57, an electrical problem forced him into the pits. He was stationary for 70 seconds to change his steering wheel and perform an on-board computer adjustment. He recovered to fifth position at the finish. Jean Alesi went on to win the race on his 31st birthday. This would be his only career victory and also marked the last time to date that a car with a V12 engine won. After several other front-runners encountered problems late in the race, the Jordans of Rubens Barrichello and Eddie Irvine completed the surprising podium.

Just like in Monaco, Hill started on pole position in France, but lost out to second-starting Schumacher during the pit stops. His teammate Coulthard started and finished in third.

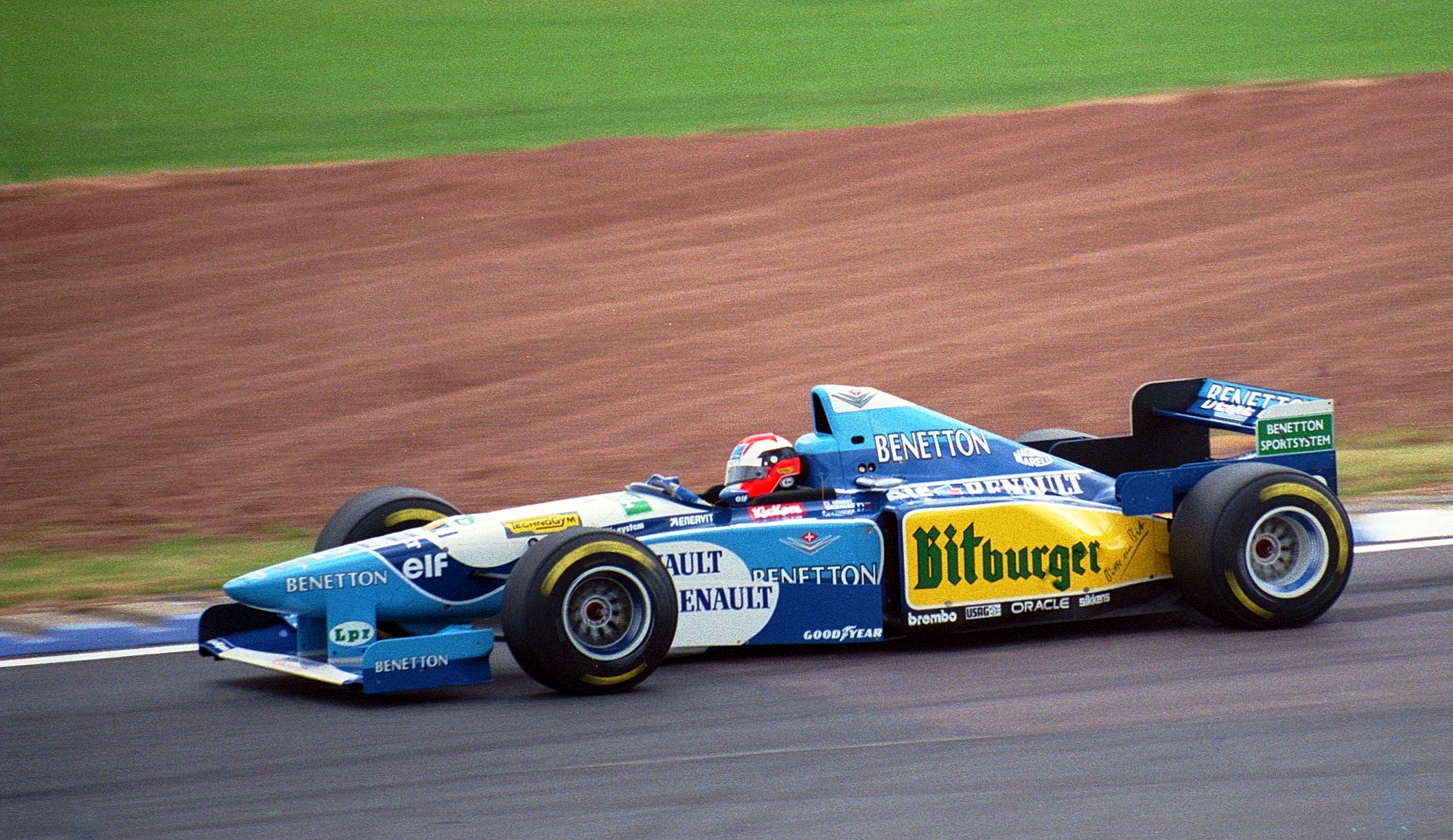
Johnny Herbert (Benetton) won the 1995 British Grand Prix

During the British Grand Prix, championship rivals Hill and Schumacher clashed for the first time. Hill had started from pole, while Schumacher fell behind third-starting Alesi. As happened regularly this season, Schumacher took the lead by only needing one pit stop, compared to Hill's two. But when the Williams tried to repass the Benetton, the two collided and retired. This promoted their teammates Johnny Herbert and David Coulthard to the front. Coulthard took the lead, but incurred a stop-go penalty for speeding in the pit lane. Herbert won the first race of his career, ahead of Jean Alesi in the Ferrari.

Two weeks later, Michael Schumacher won his home race, the German Grand Prix. Damon Hill had achieved pole position once again, but this time, spun off on the second lap as a result of driveshaft failure. David Coulthard finished second, Gerhard Berger was third, recovering from a 10-second stop-go penalty for jumping the start.

The 1995 Hungarian Grand Prix was a grand slam for Damon Hill: he won from pole position and set the fastest lap. Coulthard finished second and Berger third. Michael Schumacher was classified three laps down, suffering from fuel pump issues. During the race, Taki Inoue had his second coming together with the safety car. This time, he himself was hit by the Tatra 623 when running over to his Footwork with a fire extinguisher. He suffered minor injuries to his leg.

In the Drivers' Championship, Michael Schumacher was leading with 56 points, ahead of Damon Hill with 45 and Jean Alesi with 32. It was closer at the front of the Constructors' Championship, with Benetton and Williams separated by just six points (74 and 68, respectively), followed by Ferrari with 57.

=== Rounds 11 to 14 ===
Qualifying for the Belgian Grand Prix took place in varying weather conditions and championship rivals Michael Schumacher and Damon Hill could only achieve sixteenth and eighth place on the grid, respectively. Ferrari's Gerhard Berger and Jean Alesi blocked out on the front row, but both retired during the race. Schumacher's teammate Johnny Herbert briefly led the race, but struggled for pace on the drying track. Hill took the lead after his teammate David Coulthard retired with gearbox issues, but then, as it was seen at least three times during the season already, Schumacher passed him during the round of pit stops. The story did not end there, however: the rain arrived and Hill made a second pit stop for rain tyres, while Schumacher tried to brave it out, at one point lapping six seconds slower than his rival. To make matters worse, he went off the track and the Williams took the lead until the rain stopped, the track dried, and the Benetton was back on top. When the safety car came out, the playing field was levelled and Schumacher led away from Hill, both on wet tyres. It looked like a thrilling battle to come, until the Brit was served a 10-second stop-go penalty for speeding in the pit lane. He did recover to second place, but finished far behind the German. Martin Brundle came home in a surprising third position. After the race, Schumacher was given a one-race suspended ban for defending too aggressively.

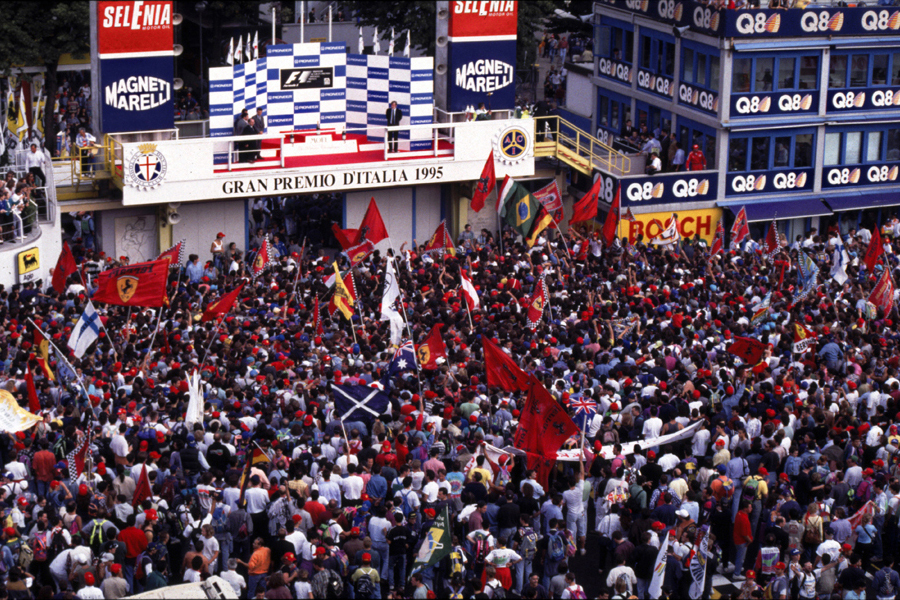
Podium celebration after the Italian Grand Prix

On the formation lap of the Italian Grand Prix, pole-sitter David Coulthard spun off and retired with terminal damage. However, when the race was suspended after a first-lap collision in the same corner, with the track being blocked by four stranded cars, Coulthard was able to take the restart in a spare car, on pole position. Michael Schumacher and Gerhard Berger started behind him. On lap 13, Coulthard retired again, this time with a wheel bearing failure, and Schumacher crashed out when he was hit in the back by championship rival Damon Hill. After the incident, reminiscent of the one at Silverstone, Schumacher was furious with Hill, but calmed down when learning that the Brit had had to take evasive action when lapping Taki Inoue. The Ferraris were running 1–2 on home soil, until a TV camera on Alesi's rear wing fell off and destroyed Berger's suspension. With eight laps to go, the Frenchman also retired and handed a second victory to Benetton's Johnny Herbert. Mika Häkkinen (McLaren) and Heinz-Harald Frentzen (Sauber) achieved their best results yet in second and third, respectively. After the race, Hill was given a one-race suspended ban for his part in the collision.

In Portugal, Coulthard started on pole position again and this time, he held on to achieve his first career win. Hill started in second, before Schumacher in third, but they finished the other way around. At the start, Ukyo Katayama in the Tyrrell made contact with Luca Badoer's Minardi and went airborne. After being extracted from the car, he was hospitalised for two days, suffering from a strained neck and bruising in several places.

The European Grand Prix was held at the Nürburgring and saw Coulthard start on pole, ahead of teammate Damon Hill and championship leader Michael Schumacher. Coulthard did start in the spare car, however, after stalling his engine during his reconnaissance lap. Many teams decided to start on rain tyres, but Ferrari and McLaren switched to dries after the first start was abandoned. This only turned out to be the right decision after seventeen laps, when most other drivers had pitted. Schumacher and Hill battled again, switching positions several times, while Coulthard suffered from excessive oversteer and fell behind them. Meanwhile, Alesi was in the lead and extended his advantage to 45 seconds. During the second round of pit stops, however, he collided with Hill and had to pit for repairs. Berger retired with engine problems and Hill crashed out on lap 58. Schumacher passed Alesi for the lead, two laps from the end, and Coulthard completed the podium.

With three races to go, Schumacher was leading the Drivers' Championship, 27 points ahead of Hill. This meant that the Williams driver needed to win all remaining races, with his Benetton rival scoring less than three points. In the Constructors' Championship, Benetton was leading Williams with 112 over 92 points.

=== Rounds 15 to 17 ===
The F1 circus landed in Japan for two races, the first one dubbed the Pacific Grand Prix. Williams driver David Coulthard achieved his fourth pole position in a row, ahead of teammate Damon Hill and championship leader Michael Schumacher in his Benetton. At the start, fourth-starting Jean Alesi got up to second place. After Schumacher overtook Hill and Alesi during the first round of pit stops, he closed in on the leader and lapped consistently faster, so that the German just came out in front after all pit stops were made. Scoring his eighth victory of the season and gaining enough points to make it impossible for Hill to catch him, the Schumi was crowned the 1995 Drivers' Champion. He was the youngest double Drivers' Champion up to that point (his record was subsequently surpassed by Sebastian Vettel).

Schumacher did not settle down: he started on pole position for the Japanese Grand Prix. The Williams cars could not match the pace and made room for Jean Alesi and Mika Häkkinen in the top three on the grid. All drivers started on rain tyres, as it had rained in the morning and the track was damp, but it did not stop the champion from leading away. Both Ferraris were judged to have jumped the start and served a 10-second stop-go penalty. But Alesi was the first to switch to dry tyres and began making his way through the field. On lap 25, he was only six seconds behind leader Schumacher, when he had to retire with a driveshaft failure. When the rain arrived, but only on one edge of the circuit, teammates Hill and Coulthard crashed out in the same corner, one lap after each other. Schumacher won and his teammate Johnny Herbert came home in third, earning Benetton the 1995 Constructors' Champions.

The final race of the season was held in Australia and saw most of the front-running cars retire, except for polesitter Damon Hill. David Coulthard crashed while entering the pit lane, Schumacher and Alesi collided, and Herbert and Berger retired with mechanical issues. Hill won, over two laps ahead of Ligier's Olivier Panis and Gianni Morbidelli in a Footwork, equalling Jackie Stewart's feat during the 1969 Spanish Grand Prix.

== Results and standings ==
=== Grands Prix ===
Round	Grand Prix	Pole position	Fastest lap	Winning driver	Winning constructor	Report
1	(Brazil) Brazilian Grand Prix	(United Kingdom) Damon Hill	(Germany) Michael Schumacher	(Germany) Michael Schumacher	(United Kingdom) Benetton-Renault	Report
2	(Argentina) Argentine Grand Prix	(United Kingdom) David Coulthard	(Germany) Michael Schumacher	(United Kingdom) Damon Hill	(United Kingdom) Williams-Renault	Report
3	(Italy) San Marino Grand Prix	(Germany) Michael Schumacher	(Austria) Gerhard Berger	(United Kingdom) Damon Hill	(United Kingdom) Williams-Renault	Report
4	(Spain) Spanish Grand Prix	(Germany) Michael Schumacher	(United Kingdom) Damon Hill	(Germany) Michael Schumacher	(United Kingdom) Benetton-Renault	Report
5	Monaco Grand Prix	(United Kingdom) Damon Hill	(France) Jean Alesi	(Germany) Michael Schumacher	(United Kingdom) Benetton-Renault	Report
6	(Canada) Canadian Grand Prix	(Germany) Michael Schumacher	(Germany) Michael Schumacher	(France) Jean Alesi	(Italy) Ferrari	Report
7	(France) French Grand Prix	(United Kingdom) Damon Hill	(Germany) Michael Schumacher	(Germany) Michael Schumacher	(United Kingdom) Benetton-Renault	Report
8	(United Kingdom) British Grand Prix	(United Kingdom) Damon Hill	(United Kingdom) Damon Hill	(United Kingdom) Johnny Herbert	(United Kingdom) Benetton-Renault	Report
9	(Germany) German Grand Prix	(United Kingdom) Damon Hill	(Germany) Michael Schumacher	(Germany) Michael Schumacher	(United Kingdom) Benetton-Renault	Report
10	(Hungary) Hungarian Grand Prix	(United Kingdom) Damon Hill	(United Kingdom) Damon Hill	(United Kingdom) Damon Hill	(United Kingdom) Williams-Renault	Report
11	(Belgium) Belgian Grand Prix	(Austria) Gerhard Berger	(United Kingdom) David Coulthard	(Germany) Michael Schumacher	(United Kingdom) Benetton-Renault	Report
12	(Italy) Italian Grand Prix	(United Kingdom) David Coulthard	(Austria) Gerhard Berger	(United Kingdom) Johnny Herbert	(United Kingdom) Benetton-Renault	Report
13	(Portugal) Portuguese Grand Prix	(United Kingdom) David Coulthard	(United Kingdom) David Coulthard	(United Kingdom) David Coulthard	(United Kingdom) Williams-Renault	Report
14	(Germany) European Grand Prix	(United Kingdom) David Coulthard	(Germany) Michael Schumacher	(Germany) Michael Schumacher	(United Kingdom) Benetton-Renault	Report
15	(Japan) Pacific Grand Prix	(United Kingdom) David Coulthard	(Germany) Michael Schumacher	(Germany) Michael Schumacher	(United Kingdom) Benetton-Renault	Report
16	(Japan) Japanese Grand Prix	(Germany) Michael Schumacher	(Germany) Michael Schumacher	(Germany) Michael Schumacher	(United Kingdom) Benetton-Renault	Report
17	(Australia) Australian Grand Prix	(United Kingdom) Damon Hill	(United Kingdom) Damon Hill	(United Kingdom) Damon Hill	(United Kingdom) Williams-Renault	Report

=== Points scoring system ===
Points were awarded to the top six finishers in each race as follows:

Position	1st	2nd	3rd	4th	5th	6th
Points	10	6	4	3	2	1

=== World Drivers' Championship standings ===
Pos.	Driver	BRA (Brazil)	ARG (Argentina)	SMR (Italy)	ESP (Spain)	MON (Monaco)	CAN (Canada)	FRA (France)	GBR (United Kingdom)	GER (Germany)	HUN (Hungary)	BEL (Belgium)	ITA (Italy)	POR (Portugal)	EUR (Germany)	PAC (Japan)	JPN (Japan)	AUS (Australia)	Points
1	(Germany) Michael Schumacher	1^{F}	3^{F}	Ret^{P}	1^{P}	1	5^{P}^{F}	1^{F}	Ret	1^{F}	11^{†}	1	Ret	2	1^{F}	1^{F}	1^{P}^{F}	Ret	102
2	(United Kingdom) Damon Hill	Ret^{P}	1	1	4^{F}	2^{P}	Ret	2^{P}	Ret^{P}^{F}	Ret^{P}	1^{P}^{F}	2	Ret	3	Ret	3	Ret	1^{P}^{F}	69
3	(United Kingdom) David Coulthard	2	Ret^{P}	4	Ret	Ret	Ret	3	3	2	2	Ret^{F}	Ret^{P}	1^{P}^{F}	3^{P}	2^{P}	Ret	Ret	49
4	(United Kingdom) Johnny Herbert	Ret	4	7	2	4	Ret	Ret	1	4	4	7	1	7	5	6	3	Ret	45
5	(France) Jean Alesi	5	2	2	Ret	Ret^{F}	1	5	2	Ret	Ret	Ret	Ret	5	2	5	Ret	Ret	42
6	(Austria) Gerhard Berger	3	6	3^{F}	3	3	11^{†}	12	Ret	3	3	Ret^{P}	Ret^{F}	4	Ret	4	Ret	Ret	31
7	(Finland) Mika Häkkinen	4	Ret	5	Ret	Ret	Ret	7	Ret	Ret	Ret	Ret	2	Ret	8		2	DNS	17
8	(France) Olivier Panis	Ret	7	9	6	Ret	4	8	4	Ret	6	9	Ret	Ret	Ret	8	5	2	16
9	(Germany) Heinz-Harald Frentzen	Ret	5	6	8	6	Ret	10	6	Ret	5	4	3	6	Ret	7	8	Ret	15
10	(United Kingdom) Mark Blundell	6	Ret			5	Ret	11	5	Ret	Ret	5	4	9	Ret	9	7	4	13
11	(Brazil) Rubens Barrichello	Ret	Ret	Ret	7	Ret	2	6	11^{†}	Ret	7	6	Ret	11	4	Ret	Ret	Ret	11
12	(United Kingdom) Eddie Irvine	Ret	Ret	8	5	Ret	3	9	Ret	9^{†}	13^{†}	Ret	Ret	10	6	11	4	Ret	10
13	(United Kingdom) Martin Brundle				9	Ret	10^{†}	4	Ret		Ret	3	Ret	8	7			Ret	7
14	(Italy) Gianni Morbidelli	Ret	Ret	13	11	9	6	14								Ret	Ret	3	5
15	(Finland) Mika Salo	7	Ret	Ret	10	Ret	7	15	8	Ret	Ret	8	5	13	10	12	6	5	5
16	(France) Jean-Christophe Boullion					8^{†}	Ret	Ret	9	5	10	11	6	12	Ret	Ret			3
17	(Japan) Aguri Suzuki	8	Ret	11						6						Ret	DNS		1
18	(Portugal) Pedro Lamy										9	10	Ret	Ret	9	13	11	6	1
19	(Italy) Pierluigi Martini	DNS	Ret	12	14	7	Ret	Ret	7	Ret									0
20	(Japan) Ukyo Katayama	Ret	8	Ret	Ret	Ret	Ret	Ret	Ret	7	Ret	Ret	10	Ret		14	Ret	Ret	0
21	(Brazil) Pedro Diniz	10	NC	NC	Ret	10	Ret	Ret	Ret	Ret	Ret	13	9	16	13	17	Ret	7	0
22	(Italy) Massimiliano Papis								Ret	Ret	Ret	Ret	7	Ret	12				0
23	(Italy) Luca Badoer	Ret	DNS	14	Ret	Ret	8	13	10	Ret	8	Ret	Ret	14	11	15	9	DNS	0
24	(Japan) Taki Inoue	Ret	Ret	Ret	Ret	Ret	9	Ret	Ret	Ret	Ret	12	8	15	Ret	Ret	12	Ret	0
25	(Italy) Andrea Montermini	9	Ret	Ret	DNS	DSQ	Ret	NC	Ret	8	12	Ret	DNS	Ret	Ret	Ret	Ret	Ret	0
26	(France) Bertrand Gachot	Ret	Ret	Ret	Ret	Ret	Ret	Ret	12							Ret	Ret	8	0
27	(Italy) Domenico Schiattarella	Ret	9	Ret	15	DNS													0
28	(Austria) Karl Wendlinger	Ret	Ret	Ret	13												10	Ret	0
29	(United Kingdom) Nigel Mansell			10	Ret														0
30	(Denmark) Jan Magnussen															10			0
31	(Netherlands) Jos Verstappen	Ret	Ret	Ret	12	DNS													0
32	(Brazil) Roberto Moreno	Ret	NC	NC	Ret	Ret	Ret	16	Ret	Ret	Ret	14	DNS	17	Ret	16	Ret	Ret	0
33	(Italy) Gabriele Tarquini														14				0
34	(Switzerland) Jean-Denis Delétraz													Ret	15				0
—	(Italy) Giovanni Lavaggi									Ret	Ret	Ret	Ret						0
Pos.	Driver	BRA (Brazil)	ARG (Argentina)	SMR (Italy)	ESP (Spain)	MON (Monaco)	CAN (Canada)	FRA (France)	GBR (United Kingdom)	GER (Germany)	HUN (Hungary)	BEL (Belgium)	ITA (Italy)	POR (Portugal)	EUR (Germany)	PAC (Japan)	JPN (Japan)	AUS (Australia)	Points

Key
Colour	Result
Gold	Winner
Silver	Second place
Bronze	Third place
Green	Other points position
Blue	Other classified position
Blue	Not classified, finished (NC)
Purple	Not classified, retired (Ret)
Red	Did not qualify (DNQ)
Black	Disqualified (DSQ)
White	Did not start (DNS)
White	Race cancelled (C)
Blank	Did not practice (DNP)
Blank	Excluded (EX)
Blank	Did not arrive (DNA)
Blank	Withdrawn (WD)
Blank	Did not enter (empty cell)
Annotation	Meaning
P	Pole position
F	Fastest lap

Notes:

- † – Driver did not finish the Grand Prix but was classified, as he completed more than 90% of the race distance.

=== World Constructors' Championship standings ===
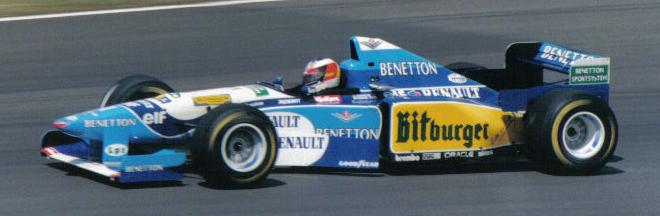
Benetton-Renault won the 1995 FIA Formula One World Championship for Constructors.

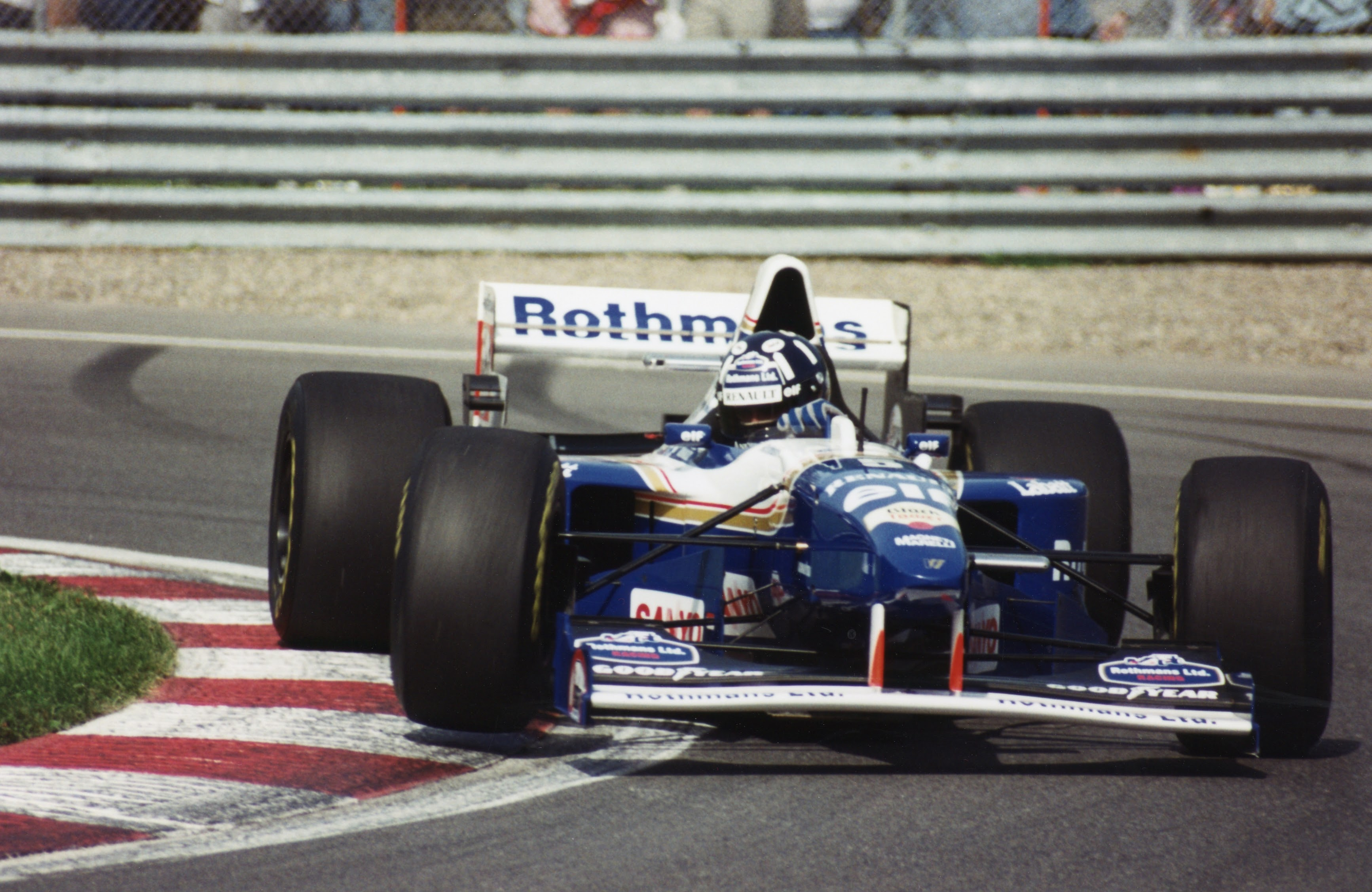
Williams-Renault placed second in the Constructors' Championship.

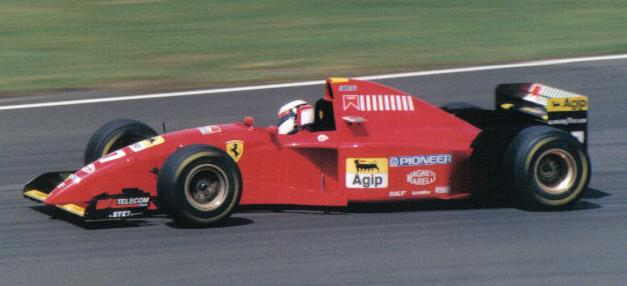
Ferrari placed third in the Constructors' Championship.

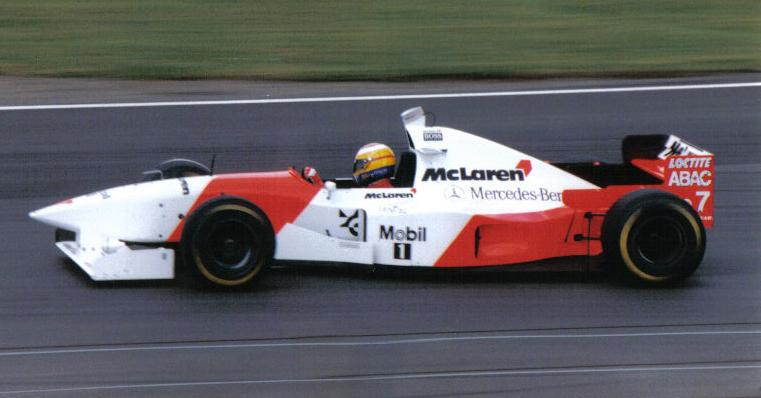
McLaren-Mercedes placed fourth in the Constructors' Championship.

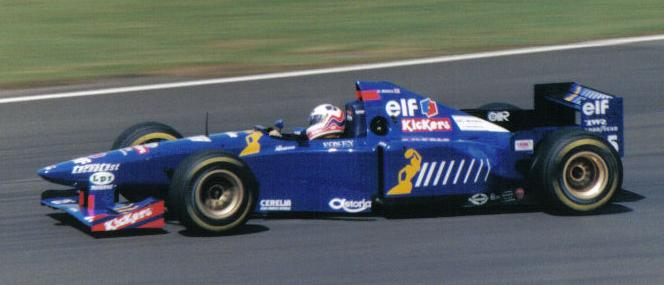
Ligier-Mugen-Honda placed fifth in the Constructors' Championship.

Pos.	Constructor	No.	BRA (Brazil)	ARG (Argentina)	SMR (Italy)	ESP (Spain)	MON (Monaco)	CAN (Canada)	FRA (France)	GBR (United Kingdom)	GER (Germany)	HUN (Hungary)	BEL (Belgium)	ITA (Italy)	POR (Portugal)	EUR (Germany)	PAC (Japan)	JPN (Japan)	AUS (Australia)	Points
1	(United Kingdom) Benetton-Renault	1	1^{F} (Note: Neither Benetton nor Williams were awarded constructor points for Schumacher's win or Coulthard's second place in Brazil as both teams were deemed to be using illegal fuel.)	3^{F}	Ret^{P}	1^{P}	1	5^{P}^{F}	1^{F}	Ret	1^{F}	11^{†}	1	Ret	2	1^{F}	1^{F}	1^{P}^{F}	Ret	137
1	(United Kingdom) Benetton-Renault	2	Ret	4	7	2	4	Ret	Ret	1	4	4	7	1	7	5	6	3	Ret	137
2	(United Kingdom) Williams-Renault	5	Ret^{P}	1	1	4^{F}	2^{P}	Ret	2^{P}	Ret^{P}^{F}	Ret^{P}	1^{P}^{F}	2	Ret	3	Ret	3	Ret	1^{P}^{F}	112
2	(United Kingdom) Williams-Renault	6	2	Ret^{P}	4	Ret	Ret	Ret	3	3	2	2	Ret^{F}	Ret^{P}	1^{P}^{F}	3^{P}	2^{P}	Ret	Ret	112
3	(Italy) Ferrari	27	5	2	2	Ret	Ret^{F}	1	5	2	Ret	Ret	Ret	Ret	5	2	5	Ret	Ret	73
3	(Italy) Ferrari	28	3	6	3^{F}	3	3	11^{†}	12	Ret	3	3	Ret^{P}	Ret^{F}	4	Ret	4	Ret	Ret	73
4	(United Kingdom) McLaren-Mercedes	7	6	Ret	10	Ret	5	Ret	11	5	Ret	Ret	5	4	9	Ret	9	7	4	30
4	(United Kingdom) McLaren-Mercedes	8	4	Ret	5	Ret	Ret	Ret	7	Ret	Ret	Ret	Ret	2	Ret	8	10	2	DNS	30
5	(France) Ligier-Mugen-Honda	25	8	Ret	11	9	Ret	10^{†}	4	Ret	6	Ret	3	Ret	8	7	Ret	DNS	Ret	24
5	(France) Ligier-Mugen-Honda	26	Ret	7	9	6	Ret	4	8	4	Ret	6	9	Ret	Ret	Ret	8	5	2	24
6	(Republic of Ireland) Jordan-Peugeot	14	Ret	Ret	Ret	7	Ret	2	6	11^{†}	Ret	7	6	Ret	11	4	Ret	Ret	Ret	21
6	(Republic of Ireland) Jordan-Peugeot	15	Ret	Ret	8	5	Ret	3	9	Ret	9^{†}	13^{†}	Ret	Ret	10	6	11	4	Ret	21
7	(Switzerland) Sauber-Ford	29	Ret	Ret	Ret	13	8^{†}	Ret	Ret	9	5	10	11	6	12	Ret	Ret	10	Ret	18
7	(Switzerland) Sauber-Ford	30	Ret	5	6	8	6	Ret	10	6	Ret	5	4	3	6	Ret	7	8	Ret	18
8	(United Kingdom) Footwork-Hart	9	Ret	Ret	13	11	9	6	14	Ret	Ret	Ret	Ret	7	Ret	12	Ret	Ret	3	5
8	(United Kingdom) Footwork-Hart	10	Ret	Ret	Ret	Ret	Ret	9	Ret	Ret	Ret	Ret	12	8	15	Ret	Ret	12	Ret	5
9	(United Kingdom) Tyrrell-Yamaha	3	Ret	8	Ret	Ret	Ret	Ret	Ret	Ret	7	Ret	Ret	10	Ret	14	14	Ret	Ret	5
9	(United Kingdom) Tyrrell-Yamaha	4	7	Ret	Ret	10	Ret	7	15	8	Ret	Ret	8	5	13	10	12	6	5	5
10	(Italy) Minardi-Ford	23	DNS	Ret	12	14	7	Ret	Ret	7	Ret	9	10	Ret	Ret	9	13	11	6	1
10	(Italy) Minardi-Ford	24	Ret	DNS	14	Ret	Ret	8	13	10	Ret	8	Ret	Ret	14	11	15	9	DNS	1
11	(Italy) Forti-Ford	21	10	NC	NC	Ret	10	Ret	Ret	Ret	Ret	Ret	13	9	16	13	17	Ret	7	0
11	(Italy) Forti-Ford	22	Ret	NC	NC	Ret	Ret	Ret	16	Ret	Ret	Ret	14	DNS	17	Ret	16	Ret	Ret	0
12	(United Kingdom) Pacific-Ford	16	Ret	Ret	Ret	Ret	Ret	Ret	Ret	12	Ret	Ret	Ret	Ret	Ret	15	Ret	Ret	8	0
12	(United Kingdom) Pacific-Ford	17	9	Ret	Ret	DNS	DSQ	Ret	NC	Ret	8	12	Ret	Ret	Ret	Ret	Ret	Ret	Ret	0
13	(United Kingdom) Simtek-Ford	11	Ret	9	Ret	15	DNS													0
13	(United Kingdom) Simtek-Ford	12	Ret	Ret	Ret	12	DNS													0
Pos.	Constructor	No.	BRA (Brazil)	ARG (Argentina)	SMR (Italy)	ESP (Spain)	MON (Monaco)	CAN (Canada)	FRA (France)	GBR (United Kingdom)	GER (Germany)	HUN (Hungary)	BEL (Belgium)	ITA (Italy)	POR (Portugal)	EUR (Germany)	PAC (Japan)	JPN (Japan)	AUS (Australia)	Points

Notes:

- † – Driver did not finish the Grand Prix but was classified, as he completed more than 90% of the race distance.

== Non-championship event results ==
The 1995 season also included a single event which did not count towards the World Championship, the Formula One Indoor Trophy at the Bologna Motor Show.

Race name	Venue	Date	Winning driver	Constructor	Report
(Italy) Formula One Indoor Trophy	Bologna Motor Show	7–8 December	(Italy) Luca Badoer	(Italy) Minardi	Report
