= 1995 Portuguese Grand Prix =

Race 13 of 17 in the 1995 Formula One World Championship
← Previous race	Next race →
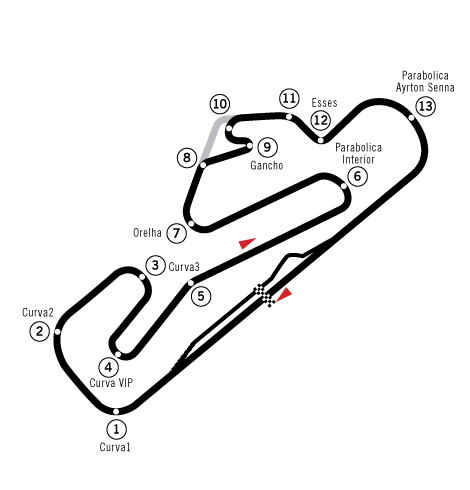

Race details
- Date: 24 September 1995
- Official name: XXIV Grande Prémio de Portugal
- Location: Autódromo do Estoril in Estoril, Portugal
- Course: Permanent racing facility
- Course length: 4.360 km (2.725 miles)
- Distance: 71 laps, 309.560 km (193.475 miles)
- Weather: Sunny

Pole position
Driver	(United Kingdom) David Coulthard	Williams-Renault
- Time: 1:20.537

Fastest lap
Driver	(United Kingdom) David Coulthard	Williams-Renault
- Time: 1:23.220 on lap 2

Podium
First	(United Kingdom) David Coulthard	Williams-Renault
Second	(Germany) Michael Schumacher	Benetton-Renault
Third	(United Kingdom) Damon Hill	Williams-Renault

The 1995 Portuguese Grand Prix (formally the XXIV Grande Prémio de Portugal) was a Formula One motor race held on 24 September 1995 at the Autódromo do Estoril, Estoril, Portugal. It was the thirteenth race of the 1995 Formula One season. The 71-lap race was the first Formula One win for David Coulthard of the Williams team after starting from pole position Coulthard became the first Scottish driver to win a Grand Prix since Jackie Stewart won the 1973 German Grand Prix 22 years previously. Michael Schumacher was second in a Benetton, with Damon Hill third in the latter Williams car. After several controversial incidents previously involving Schumacher and Hill in the 1995 season, including collisions at Silverstone, Spa and Monza (the latter two of which saw confrontations between the two drivers respectively on the podium and at track-side), Schumacher and Hill shook hands with each other at the podium presentation following this race.

== Report ==
=== Background ===
To optimise their chances of winning at the Autódromo do Estoril, Williams brought an upgraded chassis to the race, a "B" specification of their FW17 car. The upgraded chassis would be used throughout the remainder of the season.

=== Practice and qualifying ===
Two practice sessions were held before the race; the first was held on Friday morning and the second on Saturday morning. Both sessions lasted 1 hour and 45 minutes with weather conditions dry throughout. Häkkinen set the fastest time in the first session, posting a lap of 1:23.073, one-tenth of a second quicker than Hill and Schumacher, in second and third places respectively. Coulthard was fourth, with the Ferrari cars fifth and sixth fastest; Gerhard Berger ahead of Jean Alesi. Häkkinen was eleventh in the second practice session, two seconds slower than Hill, who was fastest with a time of 1:21.443. Coulthard was second in the Williams, eight-tenths of a second behind Hill. Schumacher was third, with Alesi fourth, both over a second behind Hill. Heinz-Harald Frentzen in a Sauber was fifth with Martin Brundle in the Ligier, Eddie Irvine in a Jordan and Berger rounding out the top eight positions.

=== Race ===
As the race began from its standing start, Ukyo Katayama who qualified in 16th moved into the racing path of Luca Badoer, whose Minardi began in 18th. The contact caused Katayama's Tyrrell to launch airborne and spin several times upside down along the start/finish straight. Katayama was extracted from the car and hospitalized for two days with what was later diagnosed with a strained neck and bruising in the crash.

== Classification ==
=== Qualifying ===
Pos	No	Driver	Constructor	Q1 Time	Q2 Time	Gap
1	6	(United Kingdom) David Coulthard	Williams-Renault	1:21.423	1:20.537	
2	5	(United Kingdom) Damon Hill	Williams-Renault	1:21.322	1:20.905	+0.368
3	1	(Germany) Michael Schumacher	Benetton-Renault	1:21.885	1:21.301	+0.764
4	28	(Austria) Gerhard Berger	Ferrari	1:22.281	1:21.970	+1.433
5	30	(Germany) Heinz-Harald Frentzen	Sauber-Ford	1:23.485	1:22.226	+1.689
6	2	(United Kingdom) Johnny Herbert	Benetton-Renault	1:23.786	1:22.322	+1.785
7	27	(France) Jean Alesi	Ferrari	1:22.656	1:22.391	+1.854
8	14	(Brazil) Rubens Barrichello	Jordan-Peugeot	1:23.142	1:22.538	+2.001
9	25	(United Kingdom) Martin Brundle	Ligier-Mugen-Honda	1:23.244	1:22.588	+2.051
10	15	(United Kingdom) Eddie Irvine	Jordan-Peugeot	1:22.957	1:22.831	+2.294
11	26	(France) Olivier Panis	Ligier-Mugen-Honda	1:23.284	1:22.904	+2.367
12	7	(United Kingdom) Mark Blundell	McLaren-Mercedes	1:24.583	1:22.914	+2.377
13	8	(Finland) Mika Häkkinen	McLaren-Mercedes	1:23.064	1:23.114	+2.527
14	29	(France) Jean-Christophe Boullion	Sauber-Ford	no time	1:23.934	+3.397
15	4	(Finland) Mika Salo	Tyrrell-Yamaha	1:24.942	1:23.936	+3.399
16	3	(Japan) Ukyo Katayama	Tyrrell-Yamaha	1:24.631	1:24.287	+3.750
17	23	(Portugal) Pedro Lamy	Minardi-Ford	1:26.210	1:24.657	+4.120
18	24	(Italy) Luca Badoer	Minardi-Ford	1:25.746	1:24.778	+4.241
19	10	(Japan) Taki Inoue	Footwork-Hart	1:24.883	1:25.031	+4.346
20	9	(Italy) Massimiliano Papis	Footwork-Hart	1:25.696	1:25.179	+4.642
21	17	(Italy) Andrea Montermini	Pacific-Ford	1:27.659	1:26.172	+5.634
22	21	(Brazil) Pedro Diniz	Forti-Ford	1:29.137	1:27.292	+6.755
23	22	(Brazil) Roberto Moreno	Forti-Ford	1:28.672	1:27.523	+6.986
24	16	(Switzerland) Jean-Denis Délétraz	Pacific-Ford	no time	1:32.769	+12.232

=== Race ===
Pos	No	Driver	Constructor	Laps	Time/Retired	Grid	Points
1	6	(United Kingdom) David Coulthard	Williams-Renault	71	1:41:52.145	1	10
2	1	(Germany) Michael Schumacher	Benetton-Renault	71	+7.248	3	6
3	5	(United Kingdom) Damon Hill	Williams-Renault	71	+22.121	2	4
4	28	(Austria) Gerhard Berger	Ferrari	71	+1:24.879	4	3
5	27	(France) Jean Alesi	Ferrari	71	+1:25.429	7	2
6	30	(Germany) Heinz-Harald Frentzen	Sauber-Ford	70	+1 Lap	5	1
7	2	(United Kingdom) Johnny Herbert	Benetton-Renault	70	+1 Lap	6	
8	25	(United Kingdom) Martin Brundle	Ligier-Mugen-Honda	70	+1 Lap	9	
9	7	(United Kingdom) Mark Blundell	McLaren-Mercedes	70	+1 Lap	12	
10	15	(United Kingdom) Eddie Irvine	Jordan-Peugeot	70	+1 Lap	10	
11	14	(Brazil) Rubens Barrichello	Jordan-Peugeot	70	+1 Lap	8	
12	29	(France) Jean-Christophe Boullion	Sauber-Ford	70	+1 Lap	14	
13	4	(Finland) Mika Salo	Tyrrell-Yamaha	69	+2 Laps	15	
14	24	(Italy) Luca Badoer	Minardi-Ford	68	+3 Laps	18	
15	10	(Japan) Taki Inoue	Footwork-Hart	68	+3 Laps	19	
16	21	(Brazil) Pedro Diniz	Forti-Ford	66	+5 Laps	22	
17	22	(Brazil) Roberto Moreno	Forti-Ford	64	+7 Laps	23	
Ret	17	(Italy) Andrea Montermini	Pacific-Ford	53	Gearbox	21	
Ret	8	(Finland) Mika Häkkinen	McLaren-Mercedes	44	Engine	13	
Ret	16	(Switzerland) Jean-Denis Délétraz	Pacific-Ford	14	Cramp	24	
Ret	26	(France) Olivier Panis	Ligier-Mugen-Honda	10	Spun off	11	
Ret	23	(Portugal) Pedro Lamy	Minardi-Ford	7	Gearbox	17	
Ret	9	(Italy) Massimiliano Papis	Footwork-Hart	0	Gearbox	20	
Ret	3	(Japan) Ukyo Katayama	Tyrrell-Yamaha	0	Collision^{1}	16	

Notes

- ^1 – Katayama started the original race but was involved in the first lap collision that resulted in a red flag. He did not take the restart but is listed as 'Retired' in the official results

== Championship standings after the race ==
- **Bold text** indicates who still has a theoretical chance of becoming World Champion.

Drivers' Championship standings

Pos	Driver	Points
1	(Germany) **Michael Schumacher**	72
2	(United Kingdom) **Damon Hill**	55
3	(United Kingdom) **David Coulthard**	39
4	(United Kingdom) **Johnny Herbert**	38
5	(France) **Jean Alesi**	34

Constructors' Championship standings

Pos	Constructor	Points
1	(United Kingdom) **Benetton-Renault**	100
2	(United Kingdom) **Williams-Renault**	88
3	(Italy) **Ferrari**	62
4	(United Kingdom) McLaren-Mercedes	21
5	(Switzerland) Sauber-Ford	18

- Note: Only the top five positions are included for both sets of standings.

Previous race: 1995 Italian Grand Prix	FIA Formula One World Championship; 1995 season	Next race: 1995 European Grand Prix
Previous race: 1994 Portuguese Grand Prix	Portuguese Grand Prix	Next race: 1996 Portuguese Grand Prix
