= 1995 Italian Grand Prix =

Race 12 of 17 in the 1995 Formula One World Championship
← Previous race	Next race →
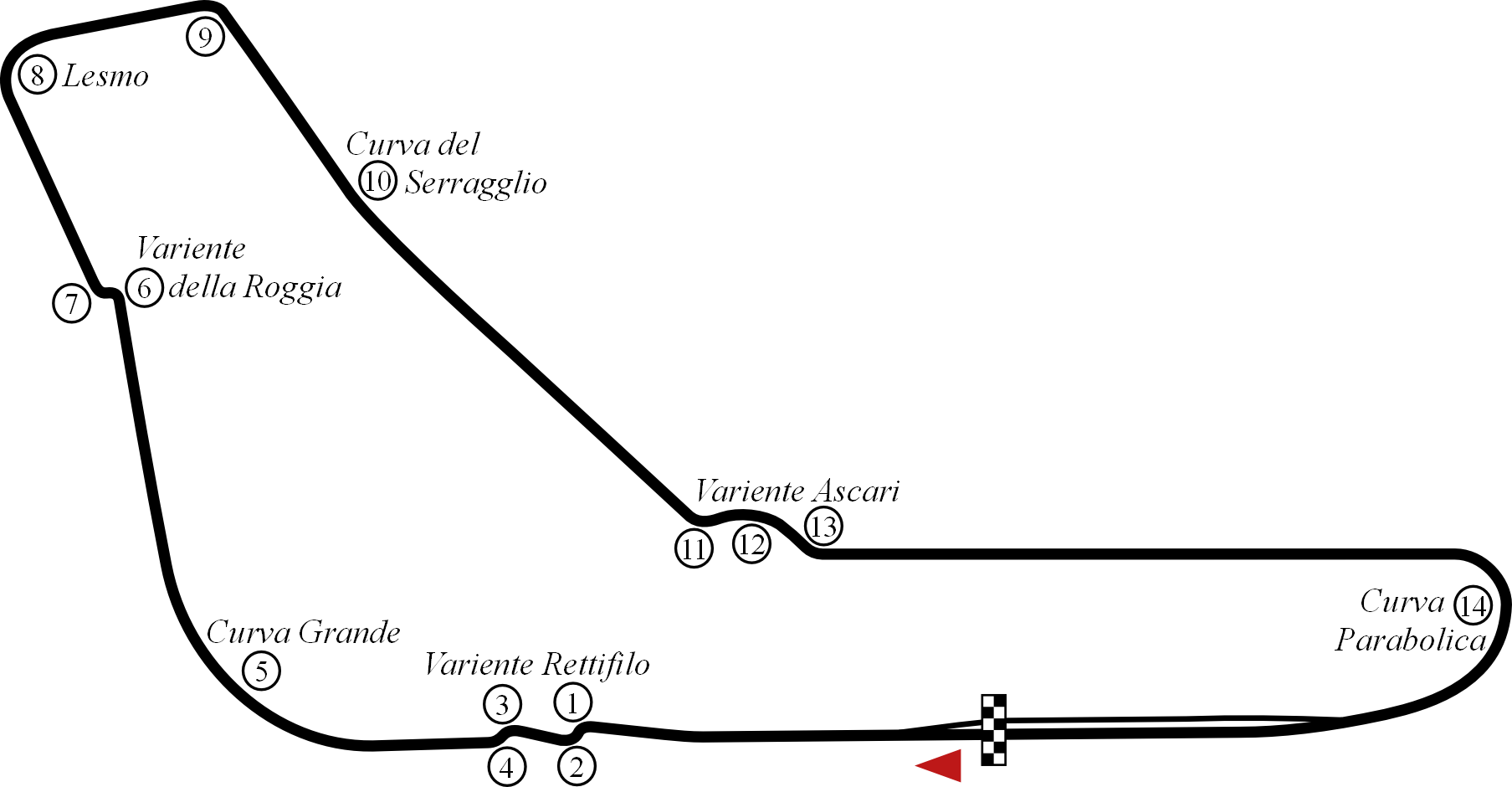

Race details
- Date: 10 September 1995
- Official name: Pioneer 66º Gran Premio d'Italia
- Location: Autodromo Nazionale di Monza; Monza, Lombardy, Italy
- Course: Permanent racing facility
- Course length: 5.834 km (3.625 miles)
- Distance: 53 laps, 309.202 km (192.125 miles)
- Weather: Sunny

Pole position
Driver	(United Kingdom) David Coulthard	Williams-Renault
- Time: 1:24.462

Fastest lap
Driver	(Austria) Gerhard Berger	Ferrari
- Time: 1:26.419 on lap 24

Podium
First	(United Kingdom) Johnny Herbert	Benetton-Renault
Second	(Finland) Mika Häkkinen	McLaren-Mercedes
Third	(Germany) Heinz-Harald Frentzen	Sauber-Ford

The 1995 Italian Grand Prix (formally the Pioneer 66º Gran Premio d'Italia) was a Formula One motor race held on 10 September 1995 at the Autodromo Nazionale di Monza, Monza, Italy. It was the twelfth race of the 1995 Formula One World Championship.

The 53-lap race was won by British driver Johnny Herbert, driving a Benetton-Renault, after starting from eighth position. Finn Mika Häkkinen was second in a McLaren-Mercedes, with German Heinz-Harald Frentzen third in a Sauber-Ford, achieving both his and the Sauber team's first F1 podium finish.

== Report ==
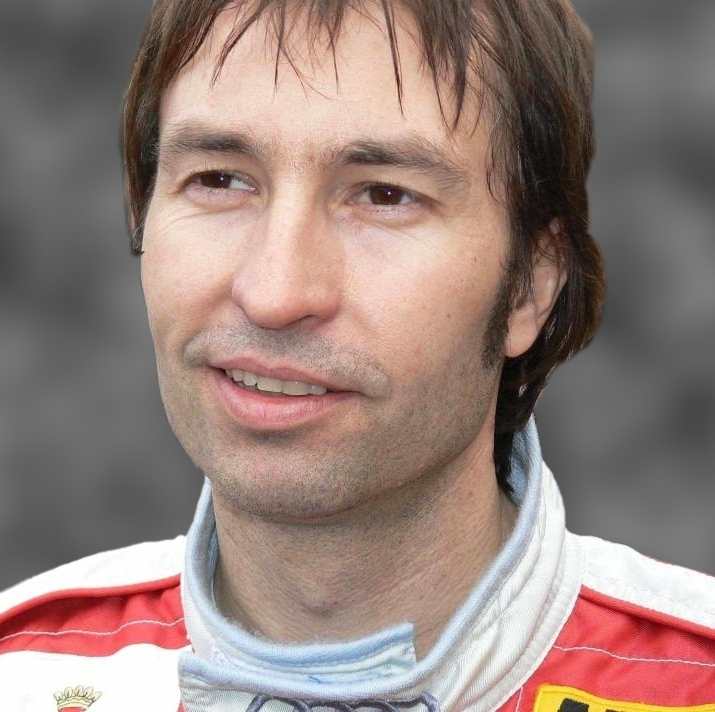
Heinz-Harald Frentzen scored the first podium of his Formula One career, driving in Sauber.

Pole-sitter David Coulthard spun off on the formation lap exiting the Ascari chicane, and retired in the pitlane as the grid formed for the start. However, the race was stopped after a first lap collision at the same spot (on dust he had dragged onto the corner when attempting to rejoin) involving Max Papis, Jean-Christophe Boullion, Roberto Moreno, and Andrea Montermini, resulting in a blocked track. Coulthard was able to take the restart from pole again (in a spare car set up for Damon Hill), whilst Moreno and Montermini failed to take the restart due to a lack of spare cars. Coulthard led until a wheel bearing failed, leaving Gerhard Berger in the lead. Behind, Hill and Michael Schumacher had their second major collision of the season; the previous one having happened at the British Grand Prix. As Hill attempted to lap Taki Inoue's Footwork, Hill crashed into the back of Schumacher when braking for the second chicane, causing both to retire. Schumacher ran over to the Williams to confront Hill whilst the British driver sat in his cockpit, but was immediately pulled away by marshals. Schumacher later apologised to Hill when Inoue admitted the incident was his fault, as he had slid in front of Hill while being passed by Schumacher, causing Hill to take evasive action and inadvertently run into the back of Schumacher's car. Hill was subsequently given a one race suspended ban for his part in the collision.

After the pitstops the Ferraris were running first and second. Berger suffered a bizarre retirement when a TV camera on Jean Alesi's rear wing flew off and destroyed Berger's suspension. Alesi looked set to win his second Grand Prix but subsequently retired with a wheel bearing failure with just 8 laps to go. Alesi had also retired from the lead the previous year. This succession of retirements handed a second victory to Johnny Herbert, and then best-ever results to Mika Häkkinen and Heinz-Harald Frentzen - the first podium finish for the Sauber team in F1. Papis was on course for his first points finish, until he was overtaken by Boullion on the final lap.

== Classification ==
=== Qualifying ===
Pos	No	Driver	Constructor	Q1 Time	Q2 Time	Gap
1	6	(United Kingdom) David Coulthard	Williams-Renault	1:25.516	1:24.462	
2	1	(Germany) Michael Schumacher	Benetton-Renault	1:26.098	1:25.026	+0.564
3	28	(Austria) Gerhard Berger	Ferrari	1:25.904	1:25.353	+0.891
4	5	(United Kingdom) Damon Hill	Williams-Renault	1:25.912	1:25.699	+1.237
5	27	(France) Jean Alesi	Ferrari	1:26.323	1:25.707	+1.245
6	14	(Brazil) Rubens Barrichello	Jordan-Peugeot	1:26.981	1:25.919	+1.457
7	8	(Finland) Mika Häkkinen	McLaren-Mercedes	1:28.895	1:25.920	+1.458
8	2	(United Kingdom) Johnny Herbert	Benetton-Renault	1:26.631	1:26.433	+1.971
9	7	(United Kingdom) Mark Blundell	McLaren-Mercedes	1:27.308	1:26.472	+2.010
10	30	(Germany) Heinz-Harald Frentzen	Sauber-Ford	1:27.245	1:26.541	+2.079
11	25	(United Kingdom) Martin Brundle	Ligier-Mugen-Honda	1:29.200	1:27.067	+2.605
12	15	(United Kingdom) Eddie Irvine	Jordan-Peugeot	1:27.573	1:27.271	+2.809
13	26	(France) Olivier Panis	Ligier-Mugen-Honda	1:28.418	1:27.384	+2.922
14	29	(France) Jean-Christophe Boullion	Sauber-Ford	1:30.997	1:28.741	+4.279
15	9	(Italy) Massimiliano Papis	Footwork-Hart	No time	1:28.870	+4.408
16	4	(Finland) Mika Salo	Tyrrell-Yamaha	1:29.535	1:29.028	+4.566
17	3	(Japan) Ukyo Katayama	Tyrrell-Yamaha	1:31.399	1:29.287	+4.825
18	24	(Italy) Luca Badoer	Minardi-Ford	1:30.731	1:29.559	+5.097
19	23	(Portugal) Pedro Lamy	Minardi-Ford	1:29.936	1:31.402	+5.474
20	10	(Japan) Taki Inoue	Footwork-Hart	1:30.632	1:30.515	+6.053
21	17	(Italy) Andrea Montermini	Pacific-Ford	1:32.121	1:30.721	+6.259
22	22	(Brazil) Roberto Moreno	Forti-Ford	1:32.491	1:30.834	+6.372
23	21	(Brazil) Pedro Diniz	Forti-Ford	1:32.540	1:32.102	+7.640
24	16	(Italy) Giovanni Lavaggi	Pacific-Ford	1:32.935	1:32.470	+8.008

=== Race ===
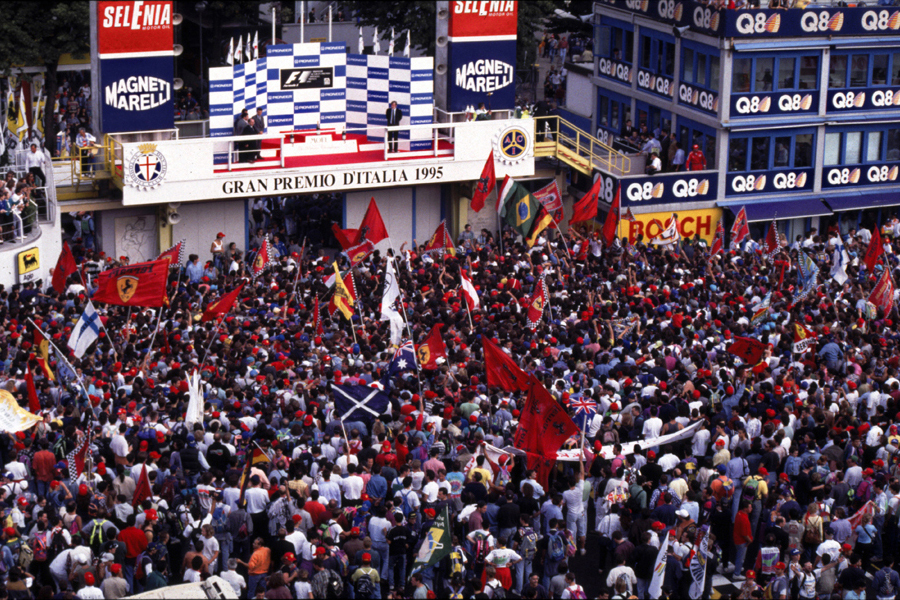
Podium celebration after the race

Pos	No	Driver	Constructor	Laps	Time/Retired	Grid	Points
1	2	(United Kingdom) Johnny Herbert	Benetton-Renault	53	1:18:27.916	8	10
2	8	(Finland) Mika Häkkinen	McLaren-Mercedes	53	+ 17.779	7	6
3	30	(Germany) Heinz-Harald Frentzen	Sauber-Ford	53	+ 24.321	10	4
4	7	(United Kingdom) Mark Blundell	McLaren-Mercedes	53	+ 28.223	9	3
5	4	(Finland) Mika Salo	Tyrrell-Yamaha	52	+ 1 lap	16	2
6	29	(France) Jean-Christophe Boullion	Sauber-Ford	52	+ 1 lap	14	1
7	9	(Italy) Massimiliano Papis	Footwork-Hart	52	+ 1 lap	15	
8	10	(Japan) Taki Inoue	Footwork-Hart	52	+ 1 lap	20	
9	21	(Brazil) Pedro Diniz	Forti-Ford	50	+ 3 laps	23	
10	3	(Japan) Ukyo Katayama	Tyrrell-Yamaha	47	+ 6 laps	17	
Ret	27	(France) Jean Alesi	Ferrari	45	Wheel bearing	5	
Ret	14	(Brazil) Rubens Barrichello	Jordan-Peugeot	43	Clutch	6	
Ret	15	(United Kingdom) Eddie Irvine	Jordan-Peugeot	40	Engine	12	
Ret	28	(Austria) Gerhard Berger	Ferrari	32	Suspension	3	
Ret	24	(Italy) Luca Badoer	Minardi-Ford	26	Accident	18	
Ret	1	(Germany) Michael Schumacher	Benetton-Renault	23	Collision	2	
Ret	5	(United Kingdom) Damon Hill	Williams-Renault	23	Collision	4	
Ret	26	(France) Olivier Panis	Ligier-Mugen-Honda	20	Spun off	13	
Ret	6	(United Kingdom) David Coulthard	Williams-Renault	13	Wheel bearing	1	
Ret	25	(United Kingdom) Martin Brundle	Ligier-Mugen-Honda	10	Puncture	11	
Ret	16	(Italy) Giovanni Lavaggi	Pacific-Ford	6	Spun off	24	
Ret	23	(Portugal) Pedro Lamy	Minardi-Ford	0	Transmission	19	
DNS	17	(Italy) Andrea Montermini	Pacific-Ford	0	Collision^{1}	21	
DNS	22	(Brazil) Roberto Moreno	Forti-Ford	0	Collision^{1}	22	

Notes

- ^1 – Montermini and Moreno started the original race but were involved in the first lap collision that resulted in a red flag. They did not take the restart and are omitted in the official results indicating they are credited as "Did not start"

== Championship standings after the race ==
Drivers' Championship standings

Pos	Driver	Points
1	(Germany) Michael Schumacher	66
2	(United Kingdom) Damon Hill	51
3	(United Kingdom) Johnny Herbert	38
4	(France) Jean Alesi	32
5	(United Kingdom) David Coulthard	29

Constructors' Championship standings

Pos	Constructor	Points
1	(United Kingdom) Benetton-Renault	94
2	(United Kingdom) Williams-Renault	74
3	(Italy) Ferrari	57
4	(United Kingdom) McLaren-Mercedes	21
5	(Switzerland) Sauber-Ford	17

- Note: Only the top five positions are included for both sets of standings.

Previous race: 1995 Belgian Grand Prix	FIA Formula One World Championship; 1995 season	Next race: 1995 Portuguese Grand Prix
Previous race: 1994 Italian Grand Prix	Italian Grand Prix	Next race: 1996 Italian Grand Prix
