= Js41 =

JS41 may refer to:

- BAe Jetstream 41, a regional airliner designed by British Aerospace
- Ligier JS41, a Formula One car
