= Prost JS45 =

Formula One racing car

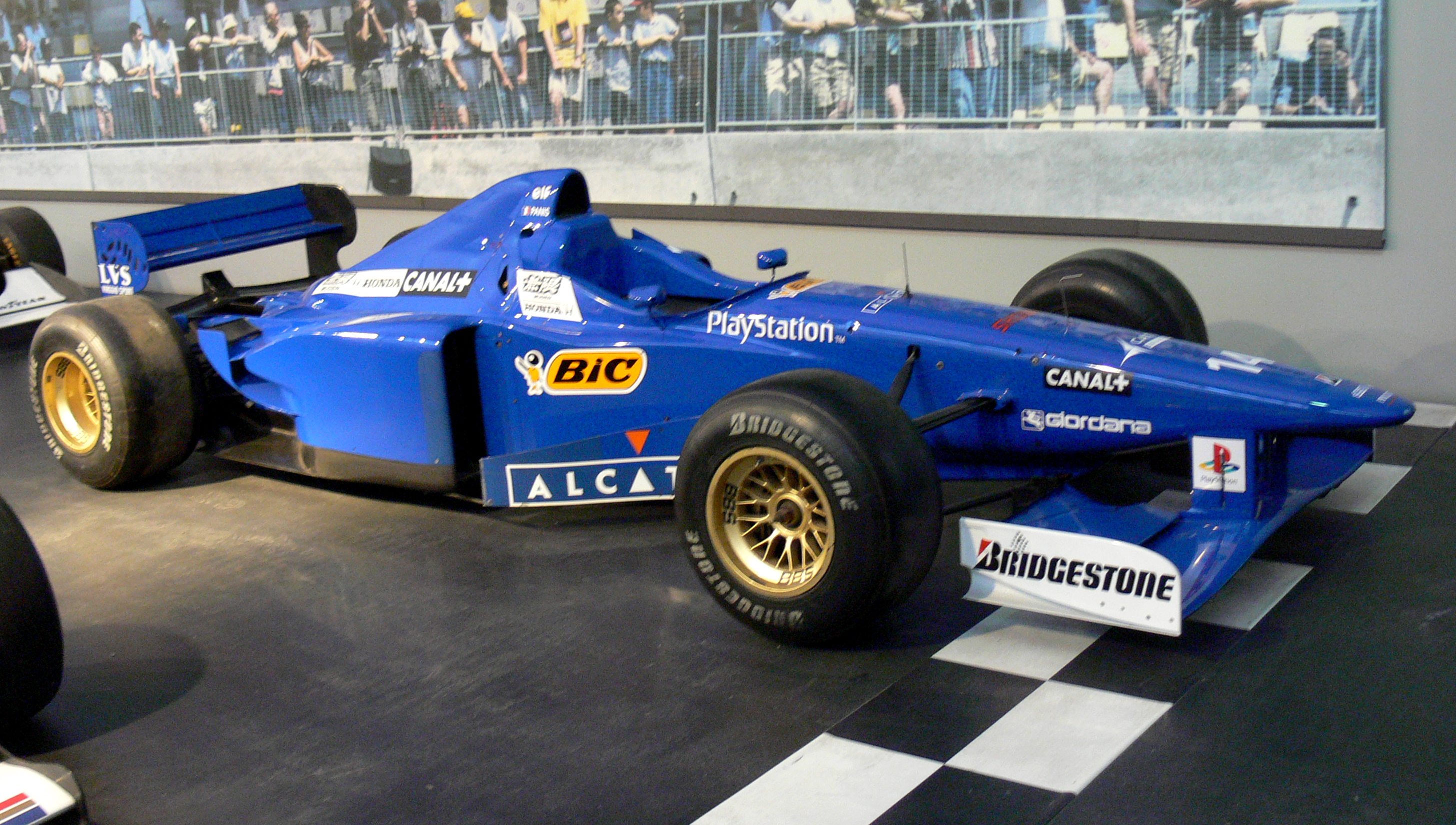
- The JS45 on display at the Musée National de l’Automobile
- Category: Formula One
- Constructor: Ligier/Prost
- Designers: Loïc Bigois (Technical Director); Claude Delbet (Chief Designer); George Ryton (Head of R&D); Damien Py (Chief Engineer)
- Predecessor: Ligier JS43
- Successor: AP01

Technical specifications
- Chassis: carbon-fibre and honeycomb composite structure
- Suspension (front): double wishbones, pushrod, twin or triple damper
- Suspension (rear): double wishbones, pushrod, twin damper
- Engine: Mugen-Honda MF301HA & Mugen-Honda MF301HB 3.0-litre 72-degree V10
- Transmission: Prost six-speed transverse sequential semi-automatic
- Power: 710 hp @ 13,900 rpm
- Fuel: Elf
- Tyres: Bridgestone

Competition history
- Notable entrants: Prost Gauloises Blondes
- Notable drivers: 14. (France) Olivier Panis; 14. (Italy) Jarno Trulli; 15. (Japan) Shinji Nakano
- Debut: 1997 Australian Grand Prix
- Last event: 1997 European Grand Prix
Races	Wins	Podiums	Poles	F/Laps
17	0	2	0	0
- Constructors' Championships: 0
- Drivers' Championships: 0

The Prost JS45 also known as the Ligier JS45 (prior to Alain Prost buying the team) was the Formula One racing car constructed by Ligier with which the Prost team competed in the 1997 Formula One World Championship, and the first Prost-badged car following Alain Prost's acquisition of Ligier in February 1997.

== Development ==
The acquisition of Ligier from Flavio Briatore by Prost, and its subsequent renaming after him, marked the end of the Ligier name in F1 after involvement in the sport since 1976. However, the car had been designed and built beforehand, and so retained its Ligier designation of JS45. Also retained were Mugen Honda engines though the team opted for Bridgestone tyres in the Japanese's company's first year of F1.

== Race history ==
Prost's lead driver was Olivier Panis, who had driven for Ligier since 1994, while the second seat was taken by Japanese rookie Shinji Nakano, largely due to pressure from engine suppliers Mugen.

In the first six races of the season, the JS45 proved extremely promising. The problems of braking and pitch sensitivity with the previous year's Ligier JS43 had been largely solved, and this, allied with Panis' skill and the durability of the Bridgestones, enabled the French driver to finish fifth in Australia, third in Brazil, fourth in Monaco and then second in Spain, just six seconds behind eventual World Champion Jacques Villeneuve. These results put him third in the Drivers' Championship, and after the Spanish Grand Prix Villeneuve said that he regarded Panis as one of his main threats for the rest of the season.

However, a suspected suspension failure or puncture caused Panis to crash heavily into a concrete wall at the very next race in Canada, breaking both his legs and putting him out of action for the next seven Grands Prix. Nonetheless, the car remained competitive due to Panis' replacement Jarno Trulli, who had been recruited from Minardi. Trulli finished fourth in Germany before leading the first half of the Austrian Grand Prix after qualifying third, and these achievements impressed Prost enough for him to sign the Italian full-time for 1998. Panis returned for the final three races of the season and picked up one final point for sixth in his first race back, at the Nürburgring.

The inexperienced Nakano, meanwhile, proved solid if not spectacular, scoring two points for sixth places at Canada (after the race was stopped following Panis' crash) and Hungary. However, he did not retain his seat for 1998, as Panis stayed on alongside Trulli and the team took on Peugeot engines, swapping with Jordan.

At the end of the season, Panis was tenth in the Drivers' Championship with 16 points, while Trulli was 16th with his three points from Germany and Nakano was 19th with his two (though all three were later promoted a place following Michael Schumacher's exclusion from the standings). With a total of 21 points, Prost placed sixth in the Constructors' Championship.

== Livery ==
As with its predecessor, it was painted with a same blue scheme livery by retaining the Gauloises sponsorship as title sponsor. Prost used 'Gauloises' logos, except at the French, British and German Grands Prix.

== Complete Formula One results ==
(key) (results in bold indicate pole position)

Year	Team	Engine	Tyres	Drivers	1	2	3	4	5	6	7	8	9	10	11	12	13	14	15	16	17	Points	WCC
1997	Prost Gauloises Blondes	Mugen Honda V10	**B**		AUS	BRA	ARG	SMR	MON	ESP	CAN	FRA	GBR	GER	HUN	BEL	ITA	AUT	LUX	JPN	EUR	**21**	**6th**
1997	Prost Gauloises Blondes	Mugen Honda V10	**B**	Olivier Panis	5	3	Ret	8	4	2	11								6	Ret	7	**21**	**6th**
1997	Prost Gauloises Blondes	Mugen Honda V10	**B**	Jarno Trulli								10	8	4	7	15	10	Ret				**21**	**6th**
1997	Prost Gauloises Blondes	Mugen Honda V10	**B**	Shinji Nakano	7	14	Ret	Ret	Ret	Ret	6	Ret	11	7	6	Ret	11	Ret	Ret	Ret	10	**21**	**6th**
