= Ligier JS43 =

Formula One racing car

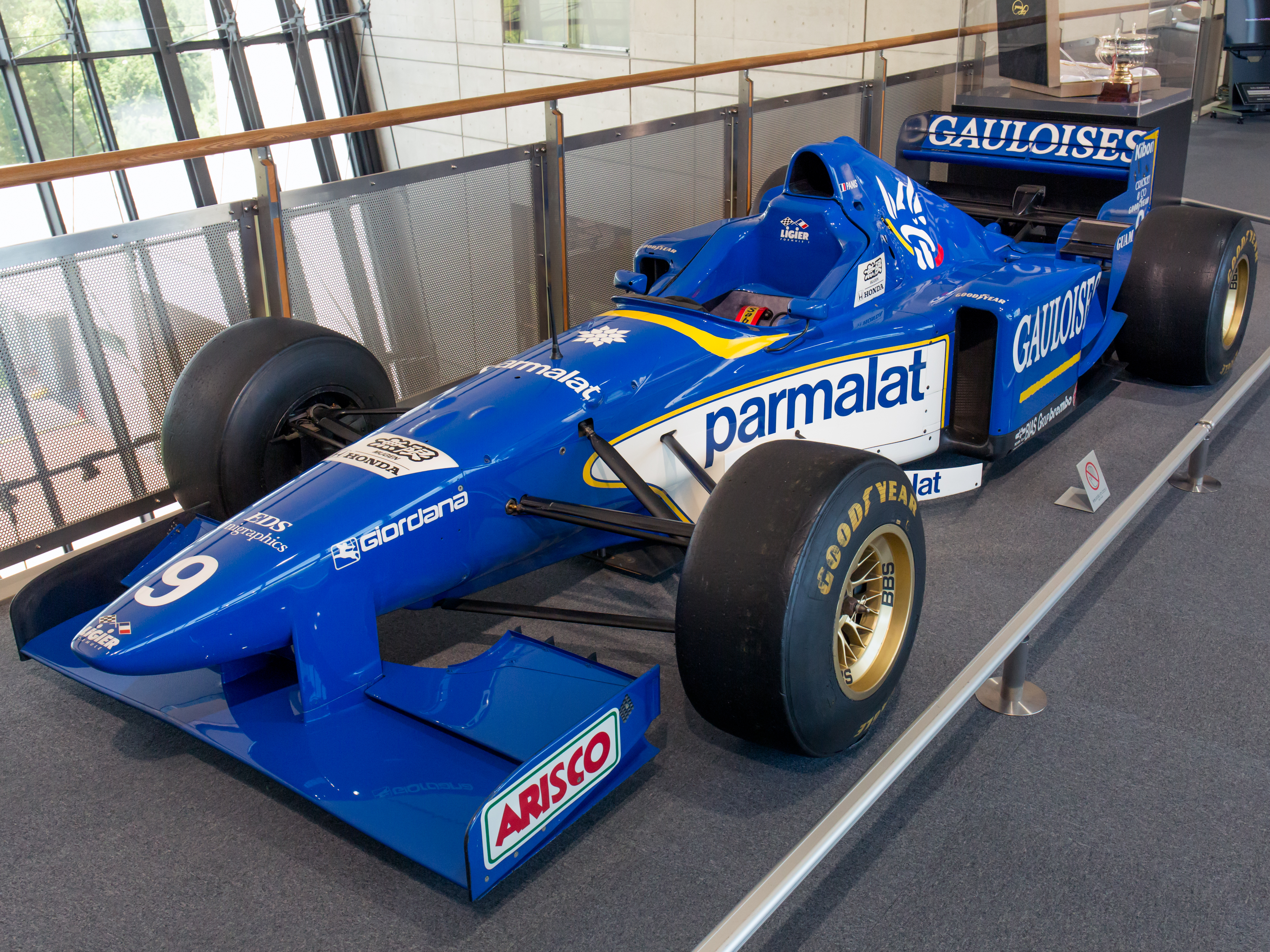
- The JS43 of Olivier Panis on display at the Honda Collection Hall
- Category: Formula One
- Constructor: Ligier
- Designers: Frank Dernie (Technical Director); Paul Crooks (Chief Designer); Loïc Bigois (Head of Aerodynamics)
- Predecessor: JS41
- Successor: Prost JS45

Technical specifications
- Chassis: carbon-fibre and honeycomb composite structure
- Suspension (front): pushrod
- Suspension (rear): pushrod
- Engine: Mugen-Honda MF301HA 3.0-litre V10 (72°)
- Transmission: Ligier six-speed transverse semi-automatic
- Power: 690 hp @ 13,700 rpm
- Fuel: Elf
- Tyres: Goodyear

Competition history
- Notable entrants: Ligier Gauloises Blondes
- Notable drivers: 9. (France) Olivier Panis; 10. (Brazil) Pedro Diniz
- Debut: 1996 Australian Grand Prix
- First win: 1996 Monaco Grand Prix
- Last win: 1996 Monaco Grand Prix
- Last event: 1996 Japanese Grand Prix
Races	Wins	Podiums	Poles	F/Laps
16	1	1	0	0
- Teams' Championships: 0
- Constructors' Championships: 0
- Drivers' Championships: 0

The Ligier JS43 was the car with which the Ligier team competed in the 1996 Formula One World Championship. It was driven by Frenchman Olivier Panis, who was in his third season with the team, and Brazilian Pedro Diniz, who moved from Forti.

== Overview ==
=== Background and design ===
The JS43 was an evolution of 1995's relatively successful JS41, designed by Frank Dernie. However, he, team manager Tony Dowe and majority owner Tom Walkinshaw left the team after ownership problems with Ligier founder Guy Ligier. This paved the way for Alain Prost to buy the team for 1997.

=== Season history ===
Despite these losses, the JS43 performed respectably all season, with both chassis and engine the subject of steady development. Despite season-long complaints about the car's braking performance, Panis took his first and only Grand Prix victory at Monaco, in a race where only three cars finished. It was also Ligier's first win since the 1981 Canadian Grand Prix.

Panis also finished sixth in Brazil and fifth in Hungary, to place ninth in the Drivers' Championship with 13 points. Diniz finished sixth in Spain and Italy, earning two points which placed him 15th in the Drivers' Championship. The Brazilian was also fortunate to escape a serious fire in Argentina.

With a total of 15 points, Ligier placed sixth in the Constructors' Championship.

== Sponsorship and livery ==
The JS43 had a little lighter dark blue livery with a new major sponsor, Gauloises replacing its sister brand Gitanes. Ligier used 'Gauloises' logos, except at the French, British and German Grands Prix.

At the Australian Grand Prix, energy drink brand Power Horse featured on the air box.

== Complete Formula One results ==
(key) (results in bold indicate pole position)

Year	Team	Engine	Tyres	Drivers	1	2	3	4	5	6	7	8	9	10	11	12	13	14	15	16	Points	WCC
1996	Ligier	Mugen Honda V10	**G**		AUS	BRA	ARG	EUR	SMR	MON	ESP	CAN	FRA	GBR	GER	HUN	BEL	ITA	POR	JPN	**15**	**6th**
1996	Ligier	Mugen Honda V10	**G**	Olivier Panis	7	6	8	Ret	Ret	1	Ret	Ret	7	Ret	7	5	Ret	Ret	10	7	**15**	**6th**
1996	Ligier	Mugen Honda V10	**G**	Pedro Diniz	10	8	Ret	10	7	Ret	6	Ret	Ret	Ret	Ret	Ret	Ret	6	Ret	Ret	**15**	**6th**
