= 1997 Spanish Grand Prix =

Race 6 of 17 in the 1997 Formula One World Championship
← Previous race	Next race →

Race details
- Date: 25 May 1997
- Official name: XXXIX Gran Premio Marlboro de España
- Location: Circuit de Catalunya, Montmeló, Catalonia, Spain
- Course: Permanent racing facility
- Course length: 4.728 km (2.938 miles)
- Distance: 64 laps, 302.469 km (187.946 miles)
- Scheduled distance: 65 laps, 307.196 km (190.883 miles)
- Weather: Clear
- Attendance: 64,000

Pole position
Driver	(Canada) Jacques Villeneuve	Williams-Renault
- Time: 1:16.525

Fastest lap
Driver	(Italy) Giancarlo Fisichella	Jordan-Peugeot
- Time: 1:22.242 on lap 20

Podium
First	(Canada) Jacques Villeneuve	Williams-Renault
Second	(France) Olivier Panis	Prost-Mugen-Honda
Third	(France) Jean Alesi	Benetton-Renault

The 1997 Spanish Grand Prix (formally the XXXIX Gran Premio Marlboro de España) was a Formula One motor race held on 25 May 1997 at the Circuit de Catalunya in Montmeló, Spain. It was the sixth race of the 1997 Formula One World Championship.

The 64-lap race was won from pole position by Canadian Jacques Villeneuve, driving a Williams-Renault. Frenchman Olivier Panis finished second in a Prost-Mugen-Honda, six seconds behind Villeneuve, having only started 12th. Another Frenchman, Jean Alesi, finished third in a Benetton-Renault.

The win, Villeneuve's third of the season, put him back into the lead of the Drivers' Championship by three points from German Michael Schumacher, who finished fourth in his Ferrari.

== Race summary ==
Michael Schumacher, having started 7th, ended the first lap in 2nd position, and was challenging Villeneuve in the Williams for the lead. However, Schumacher, in the spare Ferrari, was unable to stay with the leader and was starting to slow the cars behind him. By lap 13, the gap between him and Villeneuve was approximately 20 seconds, and a train of cars consisting to David Coulthard, Jean Alesi, Mika Häkkinen, Heinz-Harald Frentzen, and Johnny Herbert was behind him. His lap times were approximately 1:26 while Villeneuve's was 1:22.

In this high tyre wearing race, especially for the Goodyear tyres, the first pit stops started at approximately lap 14, with the final one being on lap 25, which was Olivier Panis, in his finely balanced Prost with Bridgestone tyres. Soon after, beginning from lap 29, three stop runners were starting to pit for the 2nd time. This enabled Panis to gain positions, and by lap 34, he was 4th, and closing on Alesi and Coulthard who were 2nd and 3rd respectively. Soon after, Panis overtook Coulthard, who was on inferior Goodyear tyres, in a fine move on the approach to turn 1. Panis managed to jump to 2nd place ahead of Alesi in the pits.

Panis was gaining on the leader, Villeneuve, by approximately 1.5 seconds per lap. By the end of lap 49, the gap was 10.8 seconds, from 13 seconds at the end of lap 47. However, during lap 50, Panis was held up by traffic, firstly Ralf Schumacher's Jordan and then the Ferrari of Eddie Irvine. With marshals not waving the blue flags, Irvine failed to let Panis through, and thus allowing Jean Alesi and Michael Schumacher to catch him up. When Irvine finally yielded on lap 57, the gap between Panis and Villeneuve was back up to 16.1 seconds. Irvine later received a stop-go penalty for his actions. After Panis cleared the traffic, he was lapping 1.5 to 2 seconds faster than the leader and managed to close the gap to less than 6 seconds by the end of the race, but it was too late and Villeneuve took his 3rd victory of the season. This was Panis's final podium finish in Formula One.

== Classification ==
=== Qualifying ===
Pos	No	Driver	Constructor	Time	Gap
1	3	(Canada) Jacques Villeneuve	Williams-Renault	1:16.525	
2	4	(Germany) Heinz-Harald Frentzen	Williams-Renault	1:16.791	+0.266
3	10	(United Kingdom) David Coulthard	McLaren-Mercedes	1:17.521	+0.996
4	7	(France) Jean Alesi	Benetton-Renault	1:17.717	+1.192
5	9	(Finland) Mika Häkkinen	McLaren-Mercedes	1:17.737	+1.212
6	8	(Austria) Gerhard Berger	Benetton-Renault	1:18.041	+1.516
7	5	(Germany) Michael Schumacher	Ferrari	1:18.313	+1.788
8	12	(Italy) Giancarlo Fisichella	Jordan-Peugeot	1:18.385	+1.860
9	11	(Germany) Ralf Schumacher	Jordan-Peugeot	1:18.423	+1.898
10	16	(United Kingdom) Johnny Herbert	Sauber-Petronas	1:18.494	+1.969
11	6	(United Kingdom) Eddie Irvine	Ferrari	1:18.873	+2.348
12	14	(France) Olivier Panis	Prost-Mugen-Honda	1:19.157	+2.632
13	17	(Italy) Gianni Morbidelli	Sauber-Petronas	1:19.323	+2.798
14	19	(Finland) Mika Salo	Tyrrell-Ford	1:20.079	+3.554
15	1	(United Kingdom) Damon Hill	Arrows-Yamaha	1:20.089	+3.564
16	15	(Japan) Shinji Nakano	Prost-Mugen-Honda	1:20.103	+3.578
17	22	(Brazil) Rubens Barrichello	Stewart-Ford	1:20.255	+3.730
18	21	(Italy) Jarno Trulli	Minardi-Hart	1:20.452	+3.927
19	18	(Netherlands) Jos Verstappen	Tyrrell-Ford	1:20.582	+4.057
20	20	(Japan) Ukyo Katayama	Minardi-Hart	1:20.672	+4.147
21	2	(Brazil) Pedro Diniz	Arrows-Yamaha	1:21.029	+4.504
22	23	(Denmark) Jan Magnussen	Stewart-Ford	1:21.060	+4.535
107% time: 1:21.882

=== Race ===
Pos	No	Driver	Constructor	Laps	Time/Retired	Grid	Points
1	3	(Canada) Jacques Villeneuve	Williams-Renault	64	1:30:35.896	1	10
2	14	(France) Olivier Panis	Prost-Mugen-Honda	64	+5.804	12	6
3	7	(France) Jean Alesi	Benetton-Renault	64	+12.534	4	4
4	5	(Germany) Michael Schumacher	Ferrari	64	+17.979	7	3
5	16	(United Kingdom) Johnny Herbert	Sauber-Petronas	64	+27.986	10	2
6	10	(United Kingdom) David Coulthard	McLaren-Mercedes	64	+29.744	3	1
7	9	(Finland) Mika Häkkinen	McLaren-Mercedes	64	+48.785	5	
8	4	(Germany) Heinz-Harald Frentzen	Williams-Renault	64	+1:04.139	2	
9	12	(Italy) Giancarlo Fisichella	Jordan-Peugeot	64	+1:04.767	8	
10	8	(Austria) Gerhard Berger	Benetton-Renault	64	+1:05.670	6	
11	18	(Netherlands) Jos Verstappen	Tyrrell-Ford	63	+1 lap	19	
12	6	(United Kingdom) Eddie Irvine	Ferrari	63	+1 lap	11	
13	23	(Denmark) Jan Magnussen	Stewart-Ford	63	+1 lap	22	
14	17	(Italy) Gianni Morbidelli	Sauber-Petronas	62	+2 laps	13	
15	21	(Italy) Jarno Trulli	Minardi-Hart	62	+2 laps	18	
Ret	2	(Brazil) Pedro Diniz	Arrows-Yamaha	53	Engine	21	
Ret	11	(Germany) Ralf Schumacher	Jordan-Peugeot	50	Engine	9	
Ret	22	(Brazil) Rubens Barrichello	Stewart-Ford	37	Engine	17	
Ret	19	(Finland) Mika Salo	Tyrrell-Ford	35	Puncture	14	
Ret	15	(Japan) Shinji Nakano	Prost-Mugen-Honda	34	Gearbox	16	
Ret	1	(United Kingdom) Damon Hill	Arrows-Yamaha	17	Engine	15	
Ret	20	(Japan) Ukyo Katayama	Minardi-Hart	11	Gearbox	20	

== Championship standings after the race ==
Drivers' Championship standings

Pos	Driver	Points
1	(Canada) Jacques Villeneuve	30
2	(Germany) Michael Schumacher	27
3	(France) Olivier Panis	15
4	(United Kingdom) Eddie Irvine	14
5	(United Kingdom) David Coulthard	11

Constructors' Championship standings

Pos	Constructor	Points
1	(Italy) Ferrari	41
2	(United Kingdom) Williams-Renault	40
3	(United Kingdom) McLaren-Mercedes	21
4	(Italy) Benetton-Renault	17
5	(France) Prost-Mugen-Honda	15

- Note: Only the top five positions are included for both sets of standings.

Previous race: 1997 Monaco Grand Prix	FIA Formula One World Championship; 1997 season	Next race: 1997 Canadian Grand Prix
Previous race: 1996 Spanish Grand Prix	Spanish Grand Prix	Next race: 1998 Spanish Grand Prix
