= Olivier Panis =

French racing driver (born 1966)

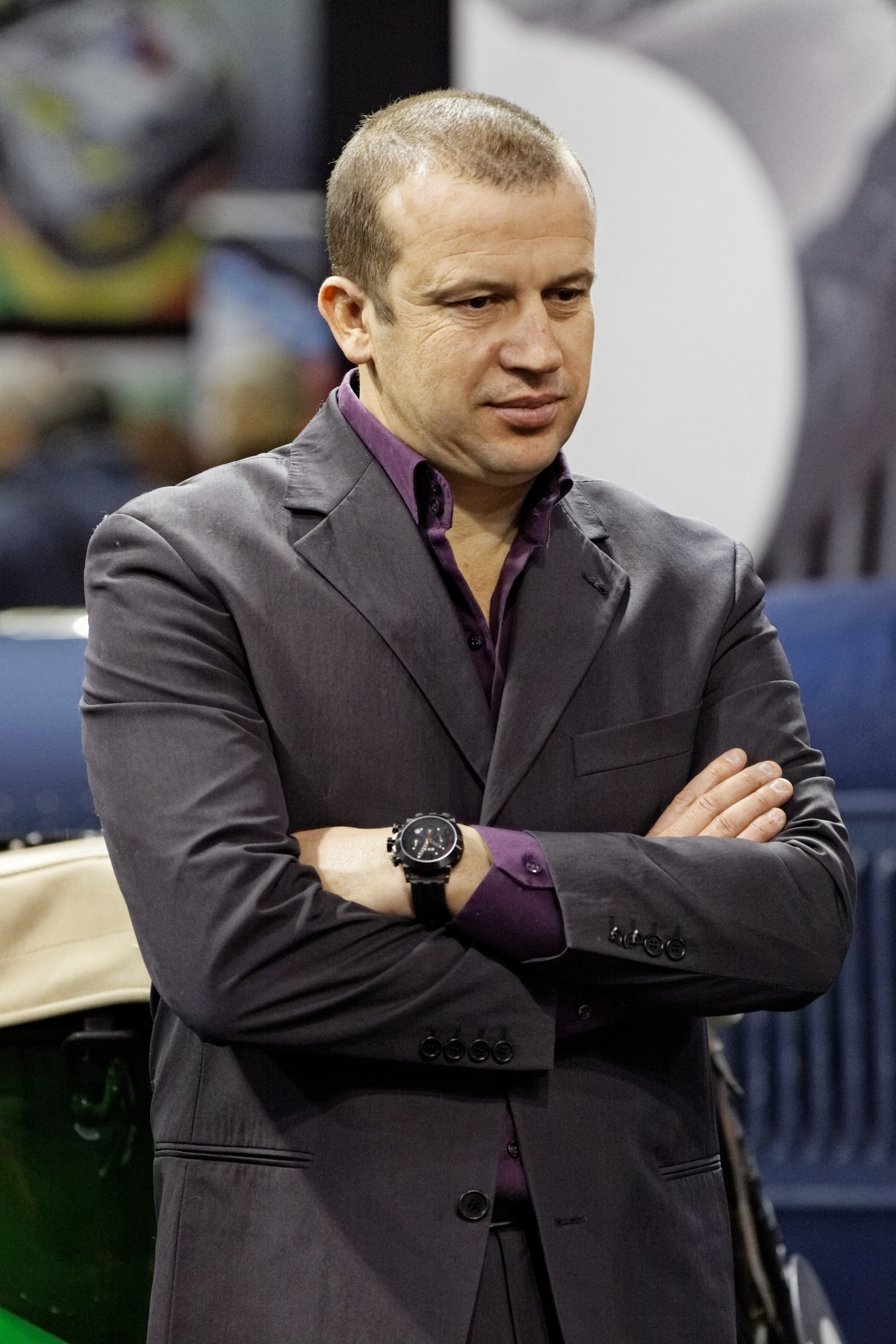
- Panis in 2012
- Born: Olivier Jean Denis Marie Panis; 2 September 1966 (age 60); Oullins, Lyon, France
- Spouse: Anne (m. 1996)
- Children: 3, including Aurélien

Formula One World Championship career
- Nationality: (France) French
- Active years: 1994–1999, 2001–2004
- Team(s): Ligier, Prost, BAR, Toyota
- Entries: 158 (157 starts)
- Championships: 0
- Wins: 1
- Podiums: 5
- Career points: 76
- Pole positions: 0
- Fastest laps: 0
- First entry: 1994 Brazilian Grand Prix
- First win: 1996 Monaco Grand Prix
- Last entry: 2004 Japanese Grand Prix

24 Hours of Le Mans career
- Years: 2008–2011
- Teams: Oreca
- Best finish: 5th (2009, 2011)
- Class wins: 0

Olivier Jean Denis Marie Panis (French pronunciation: [ɔlivje panis]; born 2 September 1966) is a French former racing driver, who competed in Formula One from 1994 to 2004, earning the first and only win of his F1 career at the 1996 Monaco Grand Prix.

Panis competed in Formula One for Ligier, Prost, BAR and Toyota, winning the Monaco Grand Prix in 1996 with the former, amongst five podiums. Panis moved into sportscar racing after Formula One, and is a race-winner in the FFSA GT Championship and the Le Mans Series. He competed in four editions of the 24 Hours of Le Mans, finishing fifth in 2009 and 2011 with Oreca.

== Early and personal life ==
Olivier Jean Denis Marie Panis was born on 2 September 1966 in Oullins, Lyon. Panis started his career in karting.

Panis is the father of racing driver Aurélien Panis.

== Career ==
After graduating from karts, Olivier raced several years in a number of junior series, including before French Formula 3. He won a championship in Formula Renault in 1989 and finished second in French Formula 3 in 1991. He eventually found himself in Formula 3000, and he won the series' championship there in 1993.

=== Formula One ===
The 27-year-old Panis earned an F1 drive in 1994 for the French-based Ligier team. He made his debut at Brazil, finishing eleventh. He earned a surprise second place that season at Hockenheim ahead of teammate Éric Bernard, and finished 11th in the standings for the marque. He finished every race except France. He was however disqualified in Portugal for illegal skid block wear.

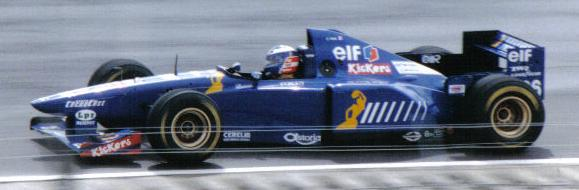
Panis driving for Ligier at the 1995 British Grand Prix.

Panis earned another surprise second place at the 1995 Australian Grand Prix, in spite of being two laps behind the leader Damon Hill, and he also added a handful of fourths to his resume, giving him an eighth-place finish in the championship.

Panis took a shock win in the 1996 Monaco Grand Prix. Starting 14th on a wet track, Panis passed other rivals on the narrow circuit, including Martin Brundle, Mika Häkkinen and Johnny Herbert, and timed his change onto slick tyres perfectly. He overtook Eddie Irvine at the Loews Hairpin and was running in third place before the Williams-Renault of Damon Hill and Benetton-Renault of Jean Alesi both hit terminal technical difficulties. One of only three to finish the race, British drivers David Coulthard and Johnny Herbert being the other two, Panis held off a late charge from Coulthard to win. The race finished on 75 of the 78 scheduled laps due to the two-hour time limit being reached. Panis' victory was the Ligier team's first victory in 15 years (and their last), and it was the first French victory in a French car at Monaco in 66 years. However, it was the only highlight to his 1996 season, and he otherwise failed to do any better than 5th place in Hungary.

Panis had the potential for a big season in 1997 while driving for Alain Prost, who had purchased Ligier. On Bridgestone tyres, he took the tyre company's first podium at Brazil. He was running second in Argentina before retirement. After 6 races, he stood third in the championship thanks to another podium finish with second place in Spain. A win could have been possible in that race had he not been held up lapping backmarkers for seven laps, losing him a total of six seconds to leader Jacques Villeneuve. At the 1997 Canadian Grand Prix, he broke both legs in a high-speed accident, causing him to miss the next seven races of the season. His place in the team was taken by Jarno Trulli, until he returned for the final three races of the season. He achieved sixth place at Luxembourg and appeared to show that he had fully recovered from his accident, as he drove as well as he had done before the crash. Despite missing half of the year, he still managed 9th in the championship with 16 points.

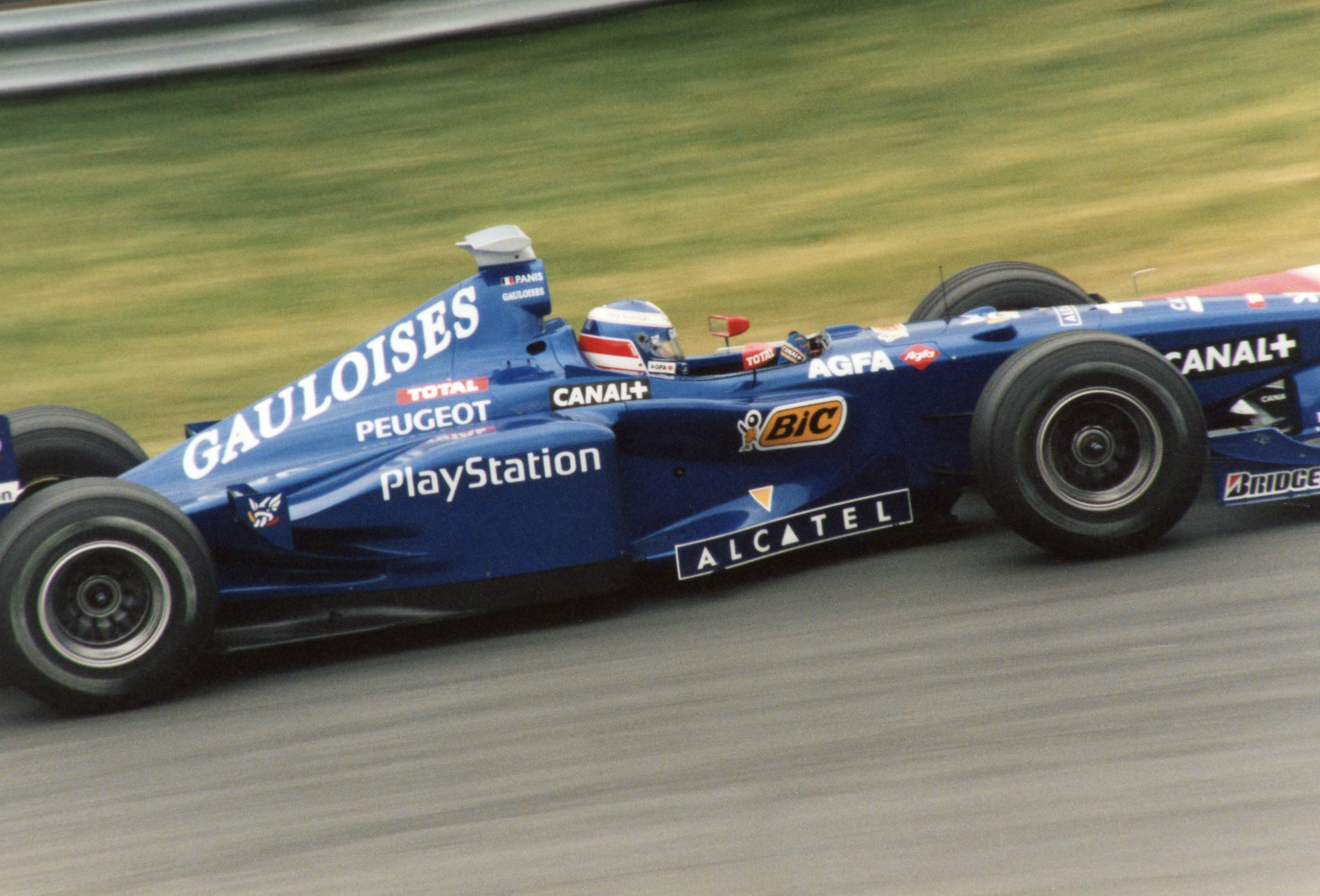
Panis driving for the Prost Formula One team in Montreal in 1998

1998 would prove to be a difficult season for Panis. He failed to score a single point for the Prost team, primarily due to a poor quality car. However, his full potential was restricted by the pins which remained in his legs, a legacy of the surgery following his crash in 1997. The highlight of the season was a ninth-place finish in Australia, although he also ran strongly at the 1998 Canadian Grand Prix until car failure intervened. An indicator of the team's problems in 1998 was the solitary point scored by Panis' team-mate Jarno Trulli at Spa-Francorchamps.

The following year saw an improvement for the partnership. A stronger car, and unusual circumstances, saw an irregular return to form for the Frenchman. After a troubled race he still claimed 6th in Brazil, a feat he repeated at Hockenheim. He began to qualify much more strongly, with a third place in France, fifth at the Nurburgring, and sixth at Suzuka, where he spent the first stages of the race in third. Despite the signs of a return to form in 1999, strategical errors and misfortune restricted his points tally. Irrespective of the improvements, Panis ended his relationship with the Prost team.

Panis was a consideration to drive for Williams, a team that was in a state of flux at the time, but turned it down to test for McLaren. This helped showcase Panis to other top teams in F1, where he would regularly match the testing times of regular drivers David Coulthard and double World Champion Mika Häkkinen. He was rumoured to replace David Coulthard for the 2000 Spanish Grand Prix after his plane crash, however Coulthard was cleared to race. Due to this he landed a drive with BAR for 2001. BAR wasn't the top team he had hoped, and he finished in 14th place during both of the years he was there, scoring a total of eight points. His highest finish for BAR was in Brazil with fourth position. He had been fourth at his debut race for the team in Australia but was penalised for a yellow flag infringement which added twenty five seconds to his race time and put him seventh, and enabled Kimi Räikkönen to score a debut point.

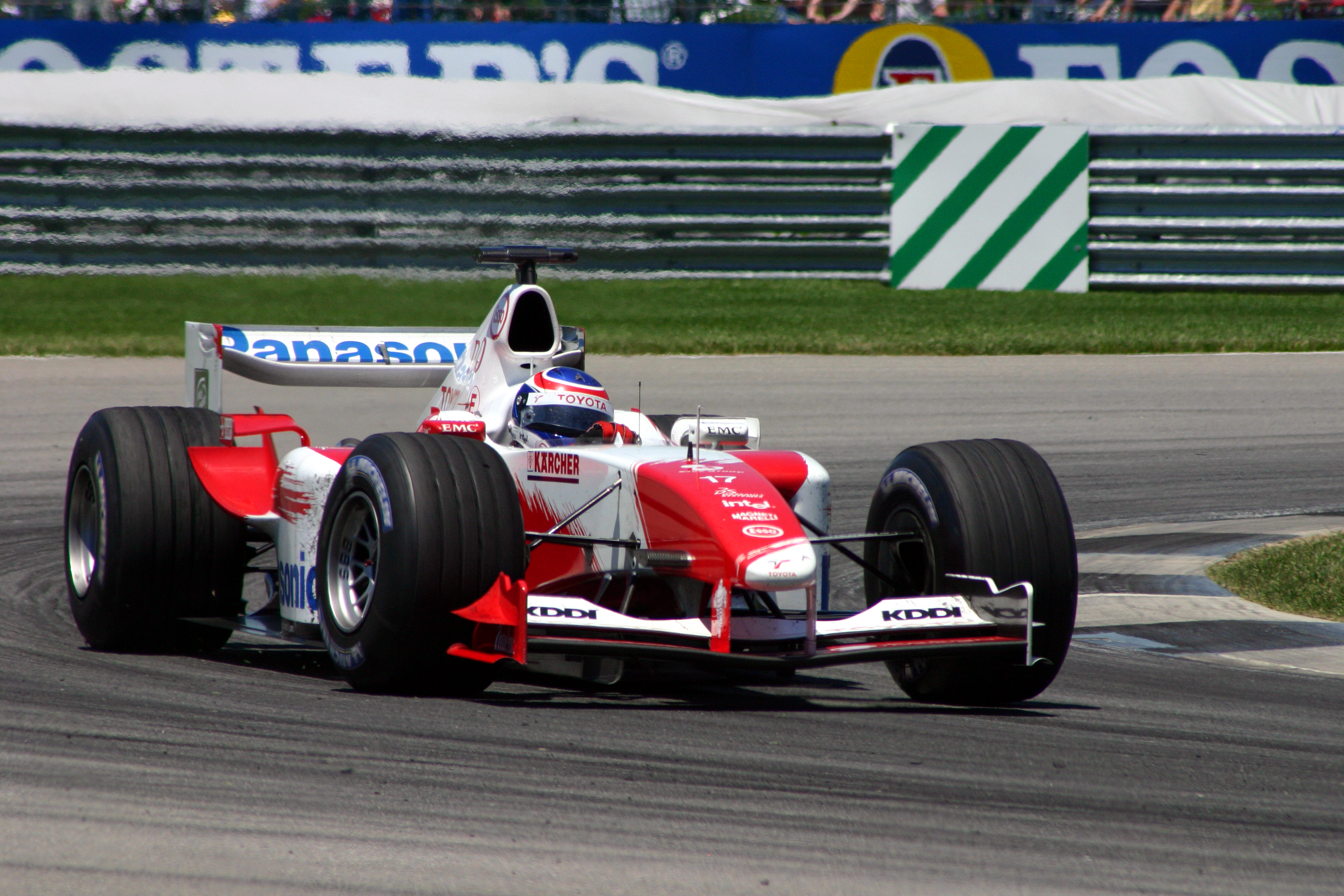
Olivier Panis driving for Toyota at the 2004 United States Grand Prix at Indianapolis, his 150th Grand Prix.

Panis left for Toyota's racing team in 2003. He was signed to drive and provide the second-year team his knowledge, as well as help his new Brazilian teammate, Cristiano da Matta, learn the ropes of F1. Early results were an improvement, in part because he handled the new one-lap qualifying well, but the end result wasn't much different from previous seasons, as he was 15th with 6 points.

Panis remained with Toyota for 2004, his tenth season in Formula One. In early October 2004 he announced his intention to retire from racing following the 2004 Japanese Grand Prix; he planned to continue at Toyota as a test driver in 2005 and 2006. Before his retirement, he was the oldest active driver in F1 at the age of 37. 2004 saw him again score only six points, before being replaced for Brazil by his Brazilian teammate test driver Ricardo Zonta.

Panis was the nominated third driver for Toyota in France in 2005, but this was the last time he participated competitively at a Grand Prix weekend. On 18 September 2006, Panis announced his complete retirement from F1 in order to race in other disciplines. His final outing as a Formula 1 test driver took place at Jerez, Spain on 14 December 2006.

Panis was highly regarded for his racecraft. He was also considered by the likes of Häkkinen, who was particularly upset when Panis left the McLaren testing team to return to full-time driving, to be one of the best test-drivers in the field.

=== Sports cars ===
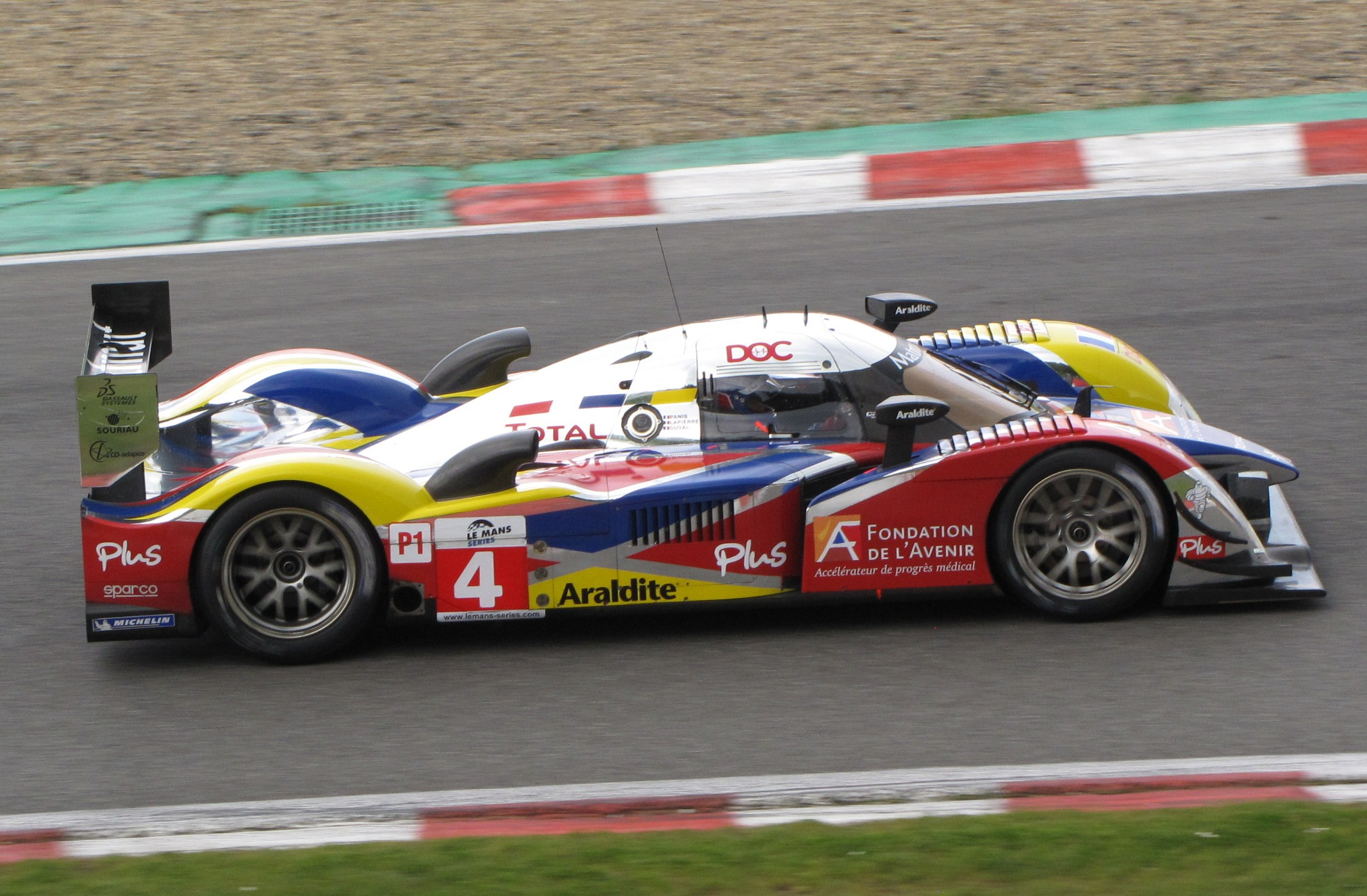
Panis driving for Oreca at the 2010 1000 km of Spa.

Panis returned to racing in 2008 with the Oreca Courage team in the Le Mans Series. He has also worked as a consultant for the French A1 Grand Prix team and participated in the Andros Trophy ice race. He had an appearance in an episode of Top Gear, facing the team in an ice race, where he was jokingly referred to in the intro as 'France's second-best racing driver', presumably to Alain Prost.

In 2016, Panis formed his own sports car racing team, Panis Barthez Compétition, alongside professional footballer turned racing driver Fabien Barthez. The pair entered cars in the European Le Mans Series and the Blancpain GT Series, overseen by Tech 1 Racing, before Barthez stepped down at the end of 2019. Panis Racing subsequently picked up two consecutive podiums in the LMP2 class of the 24 Hours of Le Mans, in 2020 and 2021. TDS Racing took over from Tech 1 as operational partner in 2024, a year that also saw the team strike a sponsorship deal with Marc VDS, one that yielded Panis its first major title: the 2025 ELMS LMP2 crown. VDS then made way for Forestier Racing in 2026.

== Racing record ==
=== Career summary ===
Season	Series	Team	Races	Wins	Poles	F/Laps	Podiums	Points	Position
1988	Championnat de France Formule Renault Turbo	Ecurie Elf	12	0	1	3	4	87	4th
1989	Championnat de France Formule Renault	Ecurie Elf	13	5	4	2	9	127	**1st**
1990	French Formula Three	Elf Gitanes	12	0	0	1	4	70	4th
1990	Macau Grand Prix	Montagut Racing	1	0	0	0	0	N/A	12th
1991	French Formula Three	La Filière Elf	12	5	6	1	6	103	**2nd**
1992	International Formula 3000	Apomatox	10	0	0	0	2	10	10th
1993	International Formula 3000	DAMS	9	3	2	2	4	32	**1st**
1994	Formula One	Ligier Gitanes Blondes	16	0	0	0	1	9	11th
1995	Formula One	Ligier Gitanes Blondes	17	0	0	0	1	16	8th
1996	Formula One	Ligier Gauloises Blondes	14	1	0	0	1	13	9th
1997	Formula One	Prost Gauloises Blondes	10	0	0	0	2	16	9th
1998	Formula One	Gauloises Prost Peugeot	15	0	0	0	0	0	NC
1999	Formula One	Gauloises Prost Peugeot	16	0	0	0	0	2	15th
2000	Formula One	West McLaren Mercedes	Test driver						
2001	Formula One	Lucky Strike BAR Honda	17	0	0	0	0	5	14th
2002	Formula One	Lucky Strike BAR Honda	17	0	0	0	0	3	14th
2003	Formula One	Panasonic Toyota Racing	17	0	0	0	0	6	15th
2004	Formula One	Panasonic Toyota Racing	17	0	0	0	0	6	14th
2005	Formula One	Panasonic Toyota Racing	Test driver						
2006	Formula One	Panasonic Toyota Racing	Test driver						
2008	Le Mans Series	Team Oreca-Matmut	5	0	0	0	1	6	12th
2008	Porsche Carrera Cup France	Porsche France	2	0	0	0	0	0	NC
2008	24 Hours of Le Mans	Team Oreca-Matmut	1	0	0	0	0	N/A	DNF
2009	FFSA GT Championship	DKR Engineering	12	4	0	3	8	243	**3rd**
2009	Le Mans Series	Team Oreca-Matmut AIM	4	1	0	0	1	22	**3rd**
2009	24 Hours of Le Mans	Team Oreca-Matmut AIM	1	0	0	0	0	N/A	5th
2009	FIA GT Championship	Solution F	1	0	0	0	0	2	24th
2010	FFSA GT Championship	DKR Engineering	9	0	0	0	1	32	14th
2010	Le Mans Series	Team Oreca-Matmut	4	1	0	0	1	39	8th
2010	FIA GT1 World Championship	Matech Competition	2	0	0	0	0	0	60th
2010	24 Hours of Le Mans	Team Oreca-Matmut	1	0	0	0	0	N/A	DNF
2011	FFSA GT Championship	Graff Racing	14	0	1	1	1	75	7th
2011	Intercontinental Le Mans Cup	Team Oreca-Matmut	3	1	0	0	1	0	NC
2011	American Le Mans Series	Team Oreca-Matmut	1	1	0	0	1	0	NC
2011	24 Hours of Le Mans	Team Oreca-Matmut	1	0	0	0	0	N/A	5th
2011	Blancpain Endurance Series	Graff Racing	1	0	0	0	0	9	20th
2012	FFSA GT Championship	SOFREV-ASP	14	1	1	2	8	182	**2nd**
2012	Blancpain Endurance Series	SOFREV-ASP	1	0	0	0	1	15	25th
2013	FFSA GT Championship	Hexis Racing	14	0	0	0	1	40	15th
2013	Blancpain Endurance Series	Hexis Racing	1	0	0	0	0	0	NC
2014	FFSA GT Championship	SOFREV-ASP	14	0	0	0	3	125	5th
2015	FFSA GT Championship	Team AKKA ASP	14	0	0	0	1	109	6th
2020	FFSA GT Championship	CMR	2	1	0	0	2	43	8th

=== Complete International Formula 3000 results ===
(key) (Races in bold indicate pole position) (Races in italics indicate fastest lap)

Year	Entrant	Chassis	Engine	1	2	3	4	5	6	7	8	9	10	DC	Points
1992	Apomatox	Reynard/92D	Ford Cosworth	SIL; 3	PAU; Ret	CAT; 7	PER; Ret	HOC; 20	NÜR; Ret	SPA; Ret	ALB; Ret	NOG; Ret	MAG; 2	10th	10
1993	DAMS	Reynard/93D	Ford Cosworth	DON; 3	SIL; 6	PAU; Ret	PER; Ret	HOC; 1	**NÜR**; 1	**SPA**; 1	MAG; 10	NOG; Ret		**1st**	**32**

=== Complete Formula One results ===
(key) (Races in bold indicate pole position; races in italics indicate fastest lap)

Year	Entrant	Chassis	Engine	1	2	3	4	5	6	7	8	9	10	11	12	13	14	15	16	17	18	19	WDC	Points
1994	Ligier Gitanes Blondes	Ligier JS39B	Renault RS6 3.5 V10	BRA; 11	PAC; 9	SMR; 11	MON; 9	ESP; 7	CAN; 12	FRA; Ret	GBR; 12	GER; 2	HUN; 6	BEL; 7	ITA; 10	POR; DSQ	EUR; 9	JPN; 11	AUS; 5				11th	9
1995	Ligier Gitanes Blondes	Ligier JS41	Mugen Honda MF301 3.0 V10	BRA; Ret	ARG; 7	SMR; 9	ESP; 6	MON; Ret	CAN; 4	FRA; 8	GBR; 4	GER; Ret	HUN; 6	BEL; 9	ITA; Ret	POR; Ret	EUR; Ret	PAC; 8	JPN; 5	AUS; 2			8th	16
1996	Ligier Gauloises Blondes	Ligier JS43	Mugen Honda MF301HA 3.0 V10	AUS; 7	BRA; 6	ARG; 8	EUR; Ret	SMR; Ret	MON; 1	ESP; Ret	CAN; Ret	FRA; 7	GBR; Ret	GER; 7	HUN; 5	BEL; Ret	ITA; Ret	POR; 10	JPN; 7				9th	13
1997	Prost Gauloises Blondes	Prost JS45	Mugen Honda MF301HA/B 3.0 V10	AUS; 5	BRA; 3	ARG; Ret	SMR; 8	MON; 4	ESP; 2	CAN; 11^{†}	FRA	GBR	GER	HUN	BEL	ITA	AUT	LUX; 6	JPN; Ret	EUR; 7			9th	16
1998	Gauloises Prost Peugeot	Prost AP01	Peugeot A16 3.0 V10	AUS; 9	BRA; Ret	ARG; 15^{†}	SMR; 11^{†}	ESP; 16^{†}	MON; Ret	CAN; Ret	FRA; 11	GBR; Ret	AUT; Ret	GER; 15	HUN; 12	BEL; DNS	ITA; Ret	LUX; 12	JPN; 11				NC	0
1999	Gauloises Prost Peugeot	Prost AP02	Peugeot A18 3.0 V10	AUS; Ret	BRA; 6	SMR; Ret	MON; Ret	ESP; Ret	CAN; 9	FRA; 8	GBR; 13	AUT; 10	GER; 6	HUN; 10	BEL; 13	ITA; 11^{†}	EUR; 9	MAL; Ret	JPN; Ret				15th	2
2001	Lucky Strike BAR Honda	BAR 003	Honda RA001E 3.0 V10	AUS; 7	MAL; Ret	BRA; 4	SMR; 8	ESP; 7	AUT; 5	MON; Ret	CAN; Ret	EUR; Ret	FRA; 9	GBR; Ret	GER; 7	HUN; Ret	BEL; 11	ITA; 9	USA; 11	JPN; 13			14th	5
2002	Lucky Strike BAR Honda	BAR 004	Honda RA002E 3.0 V10	AUS; Ret	MAL; Ret	BRA; Ret	SMR; Ret	ESP; Ret	AUT; Ret	MON; Ret	CAN; 8	EUR; 9	GBR; 5	FRA; Ret	GER; Ret	HUN; 12	BEL; 12^{†}	ITA; 6	USA; 12	JPN; Ret			14th	3
2003	Panasonic Toyota Racing	Toyota TF103	Toyota RVX-03 3.0 V10	AUS; Ret	MAL; Ret	BRA; Ret	SMR; 9	ESP; Ret	AUT; Ret	MON; 13	CAN; 8	EUR; Ret	FRA; 8	GBR; 11	GER; 5	HUN; Ret	ITA; Ret	USA; Ret	JPN; 10				15th	6
2004	Panasonic Toyota Racing	Toyota TF104	Toyota RVX-04 3.0 V10	AUS; 13	MAL; 12	BHR; 9	SMR; 11	ESP; Ret	MON; 8	EUR; 11	CAN; DSQ	USA; 5	FRA; 15	GBR; Ret									14th	6
2004	Panasonic Toyota Racing	Toyota TF104B	Toyota RVX-04 3.0 V10												GER; 14	HUN; 11	BEL; 8	ITA; Ret	CHN; 14	JPN; 14	BRA		14th	6
2005	Panasonic Toyota Racing	Toyota TF105	Toyota RVX-05 3.0 V10	AUS	MAL	BHR	SMR	ESP	MON	EUR	CAN	USA	FRA; TD	GBR	GER	HUN	TUR	ITA	BEL	BRA	JPN	CHN	–	–

^{†} Did not finish, but was classified as he had completed more than 90% of the race distance.

=== 24 Hours of Le Mans results ===
Year	Team	Co-Drivers	Car	Class	Laps	Pos.	Class Pos.
2008	(France) Team Oreca-Matmut	(Switzerland) Marcel Fässler (France) Simon Pagenaud	Courage-Oreca LC70-Judd	LMP1	147	DNF	DNF
2009	(France) Team Oreca-Matmut AIM	(France) Nicolas Lapierre (France) Soheil Ayari	Oreca 01-AIM	LMP1	370	5th	5th
2010	(France) Team Oreca-Matmut	(France) Nicolas Lapierre (France) Loïc Duval	Peugeot 908 HDi FAP	LMP1	373	DNF	DNF
2011	(France) Team Oreca-Matmut	(France) Nicolas Lapierre (France) Loïc Duval	Peugeot 908 HDi FAP	LMP1	339	5th	5th

=== Complete GT1 World Championship results ===
Year	Team	Car	1	2	3	4	5	6	7	8	9	10	11	12	13	14	15	16	17	18	19	20	Pos	Points	Ref
2010	Matech Competition	Ford GT1	ABU; QR	ABU; CR	SIL; QR	SIL; CR	BRN; QR	BRN; CR	PRI; QR; 18	PRI; CR; Ret	SPA; QR	SPA; CR	NÜR; QR	NÜR; CR	ALG; QR	ALG; CR	NAV; QR	NAV; CR	INT; QR	INT; CR	SAN; QR	SAN; CR	60th	0	

== See also ==
- Formula One drivers from France

Sporting positions
Preceded by Ludovic Faure	Championnat de France Formule Renault Champion; 1989	Succeeded by Emmanuel Collard
Preceded by Luca Badoer	International Formula 3000 Champion; 1993	Succeeded by Jean-Christophe Boullion
