= 1995 British Grand Prix =

Formula One motor race

Coordinates: 52°4′43″N 1°1′1″W

Race 8 of 17 in the 1995 Formula One World Championship
← Previous race	Next race →
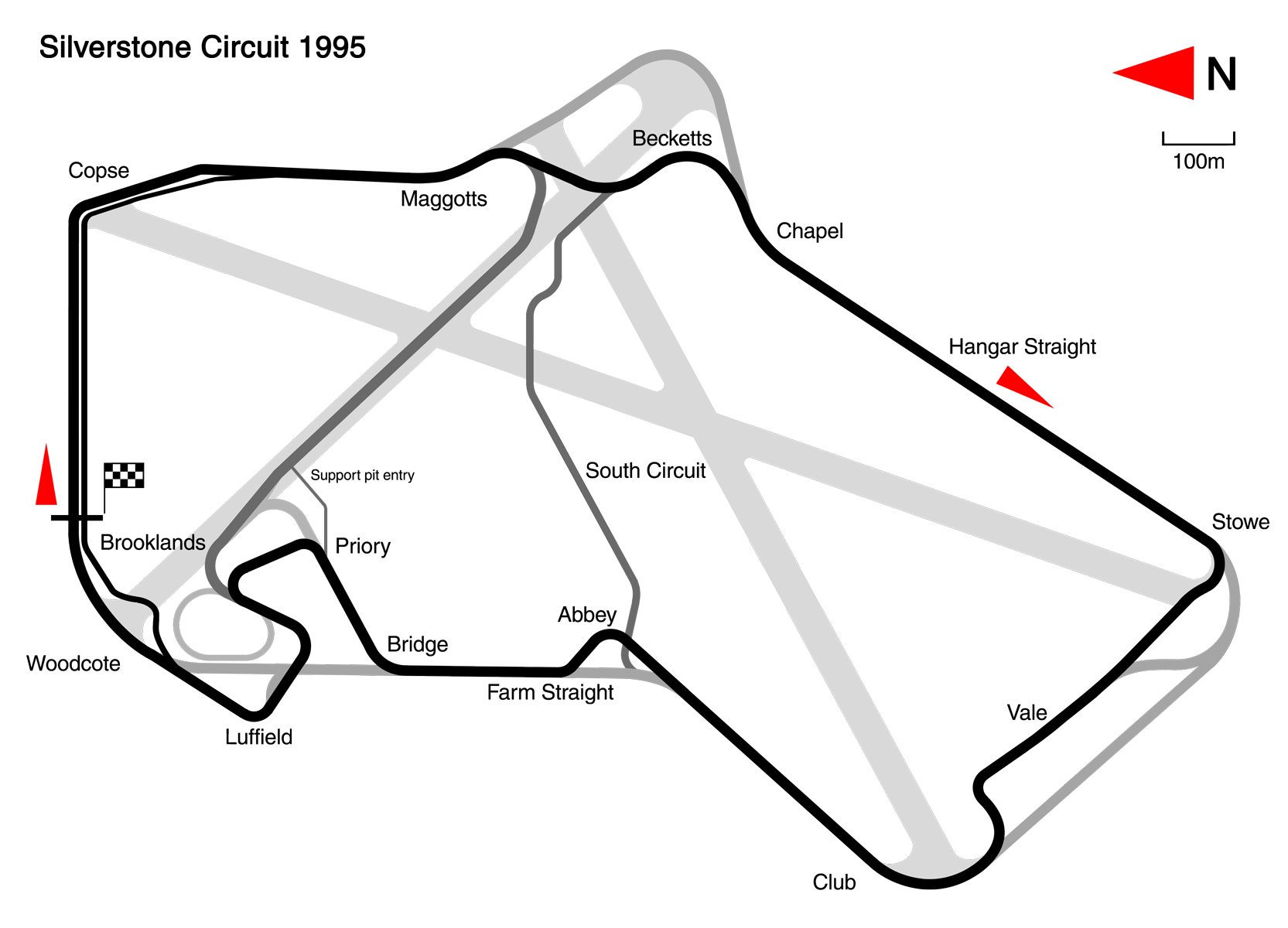
- Silverstone Circuit (as modified in 1994)

Race details
- Date: 16 July 1995
- Official name: XLVIII British Grand Prix
- Location: Silverstone Circuit, Silverstone, Northamptonshire, England
- Course: Permanent racing facility
- Course length: 5.057 km (3.160 miles)
- Distance: 61 laps, 308.477 km (191.678 miles)
- Weather: Warm, cloudy, windy

Pole position
Driver	(United Kingdom) Damon Hill	Williams-Renault
- Time: 1:28.124

Fastest lap
Driver	(United Kingdom) Damon Hill	Williams-Renault
- Time: 1:29.752 on lap 37

Podium
First	(United Kingdom) Johnny Herbert	Benetton-Renault
Second	(France) Jean Alesi	Ferrari
Third	(United Kingdom) David Coulthard	Williams-Renault

The 1995 British Grand Prix (formally the XLVIII British Grand Prix) was a Formula One motor race held on 16 July 1995 at Silverstone Circuit, Silverstone, Northamptonshire, England. It was the eighth round of the 1995 Formula One World Championship. Johnny Herbert for the Benetton team won the 61-lap race from fifth position. Jean Alesi finished second in a Ferrari, with David Coulthard third in a Williams car. The remaining points-scoring positions were filled by Olivier Panis (Ligier), Mark Blundell (McLaren) and Heinz-Harald Frentzen (Sauber). Herbert's victory was his first in Formula One, and the Benetton team's fifth of the season.

The race was dominated, however, by the fight between World Drivers' Championship protagonists, Michael Schumacher (Benetton) and Damon Hill (Williams). Hill, who started from a pole position achieved during qualifying sessions held in variable weather conditions, retained his lead during the opening stages of the race whilst Schumacher, who was alongside him on the starting grid, fell behind Alesi in the run to the first corner. Despite being held up behind the slower Ferrari until it made a pit stop, Schumacher used a more favourable one-stop strategy to move ahead of Hill, who made two pit stops for fuel and tyres, on lap 41. Four laps later, Hill attempted to pass Schumacher, but the two collided and were forced to retire from the race. This promoted Herbert and Coulthard, who were battling for third place, into the fight for the lead. Coulthard passed Herbert, but dropped to third, behind Alesi, after incurring a stop-go penalty for speeding in the pit lane.

== Background ==
Heading into the eighth race of the season, Benetton driver Michael Schumacher was leading the Drivers' Championship with 46 points; ahead of Williams driver Damon Hill on 35, and the two Ferrari drivers, Jean Alesi and Gerhard Berger, on 26 and 17 points respectively. The Constructors' Championship was closer, with Benetton on 48 points leading Ferrari and Williams on 43 and 42 points respectively. After a hesitant start to the season, Schumacher had won three of the previous four Grands Prix, and arrived at Silverstone as the man to beat. Hill, on the other hand, had won the 1994 British Grand Prix and was eager to repeat the feat in front of his home fans. He had also set the fastest lap time in pre-event testing at Silverstone during the final week of June, almost a second in front of teammate David Coulthard, and a further 0.2 seconds ahead of Schumacher. The McLaren, Jordan, Footwork and Pacific teams also took part in these test sessions. Hill was also under some additional pressure going into the weekend, as his wife, Georgie, was due to give birth to their third child imminently.

There was one driver change going into the event: the Footwork team's lead driver, Gianni Morbidelli, was replaced by compatriot Massimiliano Papis, an International Formula 3000 race winner who had also been the test driver for Team Lotus in 1994, before the outfit withdrew from the sport ahead of the 1995 season. Papis brought valuable sponsorship from Altea, a tie manufacturer, to the underfunded team, which supplemented the income already being provided by his pay driver teammate, Taki Inoue, to cover the team's budget for the year. Morbidelli was kept on as the team's test driver, and returned to racing action at the Pacific Grand Prix later in the year.

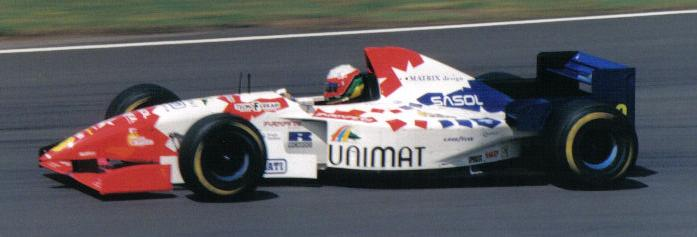
Massimiliano Papis made his Formula One debut for the Footwork Arrows team, in place of Gianni Morbidelli.

Pre-race discussion centred on the following year's driver line-up, with Schumacher rumoured to be moving to Ferrari to replace Berger, who was considering a move to Williams. Hill's future was also uncertain, as was his teammate David Coulthard's, due to the McLaren team possessing an option on his services for 1996. Sauber driver Heinz-Harald Frentzen was also linked to a possible vacant position for 1996 in the Williams team. Schumacher's future plans dictated the rest of the driver market, due to his status as the reigning World Champion—and, indeed, the only such champion of all the contemporary drivers—and reputation as the best driver currently in Formula One. It was also reported that Schumacher's teammate, Johnny Herbert, was in imminent danger of losing his Benetton seat to test driver Jos Verstappen, who was available due to the collapse of the Simtek team after the Monaco Grand Prix and was contractually owed race drives by team principal Flavio Briatore. Despite taking a podium finish earlier in the year, Herbert had rarely been close to Schumacher's pace and had only completed two laps in the two previous Grands Prix. A potential new entry was also being discussed: the Japanese racing car constructor Dome was in the process of building a Formula One car with which to enter the World Championship in 1997.

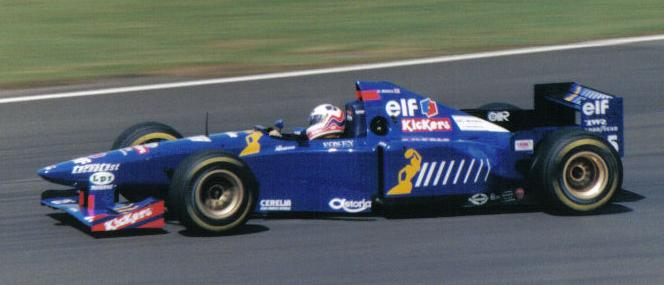
Martin Brundle's Ligier car was equipped with power steering for the first time.

Several teams had made modifications to their cars in preparation for the event. Ferrari made changes to the 412T2 chassis's sidepods to improve airflow around the tyres, and reverted to a diffuser design used earlier in the season. The Ligier team had Martin Brundle's car fitted with power steering for the first time and he chose to use it for the race, but teammate Olivier Panis, who had run with the system earlier in the season, decided against it. McLaren revised its troubled MP4/10B chassis's suspension geometry, and Mika Häkkinen's car was equipped with a more powerful version of its Mercedes V10 engine for Sunday's warm-up session and the race itself. Team principal Ron Dennis also re-hired experienced designer Steve Nichols, who had worked for the outfit in the 1980s, in the week before the race. Footwork also arrived with revised suspension, whilst the Jordan team ran with brake disc sensors on its car. Further down the field, the Forti team introduced the revised version of its FG01 chassis for Roberto Moreno. Lead driver Pedro Diniz had first driven the car in its revised specification at the preceding French Grand Prix. The revised aerodynamic package included a higher nose and new sidepods. Both drivers also tested a new development of the Ford-Cosworth ED engine in practice.

In the week leading up to the race, Williams chief designer Adrian Newey reignited the controversy over the similarities between the Benetton B195 and Ligier JS41 chassis, which had first flared up at the season-opening Brazilian Grand Prix. Despite the fact that a Fédération Internationale de l'Automobile (FIA) investigation had declared the JS41 legal earlier in the season, Newey stated that "as far as suspension geometry and aerodynamics are concerned, I'd say they are identical. [...] Taken to a logical conclusion, we'll be in an IndyCar position. It is very dangerous." As part of the Williams team's own preparations for the race, Hill tested a Williams FW17 equipped with brakes made from steel, rather than the standard carbon fibre, and was reputedly impressed by their performance.

== Practice and qualifying ==
"That final run was more like how I knew it could be done. Just a question of digging a bit deeper a taking a few more risks. It got a bit sideways here and there, and I used too much kerb at the exit of the last corner, but there's no way you can lift even for a fraction of a second. You just have to keep your foot in it and hope that you don't get the car completely on the grass.
After my fastest lap, I could see that I was P1 on the huge television screen alongside the circuit, and thought that was good news. As I drove round, there were fans waving flags all round the circuit and I appreciated that."

— Damon Hill, commenting on taking provisional pole position on Friday.

Two practice sessions were held before the race; the first was held from 09:30 to 11:15 local time on Friday, and an identically timed session was also held on Saturday. Each driver was limited to 23 laps of free practice per day. The qualifying period was split into two one-hour sessions; the first was held on Friday afternoon from 13:00 to 14:00 local time, with the second held on Saturday afternoon at the same time. The fastest time set by each driver from either session counted towards his final grid position. Each driver was limited to twelve laps per qualifying session.

Schumacher set the pace in Friday free practice, which took place in dry and cloudy weather conditions, with a time of 1:29.238. Hill was less than four hundredths of a second behind, ahead of Alesi, Coulthard, Herbert and Berger; the drivers from the top three teams in the Constructors' Championship thus filled the top six positions. Despite his fastest time, Schumacher was unhappy with the handling of his Benetton, reporting more understeer than had been present in pre-event testing at the circuit.

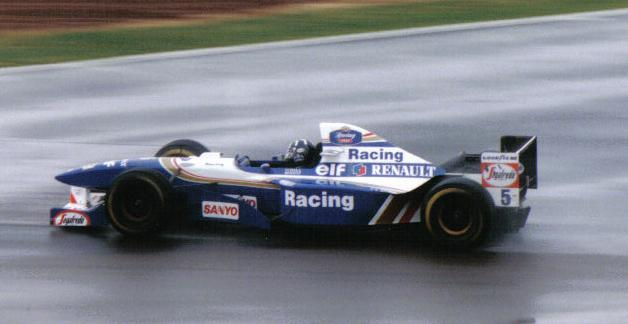
Damon Hill took pole position for his home race for the second consecutive year.

Weather conditions for Friday qualifying were dry and sunny, albeit blustery, which meant that drivers had to cope with strong crosswinds in the circuit's many high-speed corners. The session was marked by an intense fight for pole position between championship protagonists Schumacher and Hill, which was watched by a crowd of 37,000 spectators. Schumacher initially set the pace with a time of 1:29.151, which he later improved to 1:28.387. Hill initially struggled to match his rival's time in the final, twistier sector of the lap, but made a set-up change and took provisional pole with a time of 1:28.124 in the final ten minutes. Schumacher—who had increased the level of downforce on his car to compensate for the understeer, only to find that the reduction in straightline speed was too great—was demoted to second position, but was confident that he and the team could improve the car's handling for Saturday's session. Coulthard was more than 0.8 seconds slower than Hill in third place, and blamed the strong crosswinds for making his car feel very unstable at the rear end. Berger and Alesi set the fourth and sixth fastest times respectively for Ferrari, both drivers disadvantaged by a lack of straightline speed compared to the Renault-powered Williams and Benetton cars, and the fact that the Italian team was not allowed to take part in pre-event testing at the circuit as per the FIA's regulations. Team principal Jean Todt, however, described lack of testing as "a feeble excuse" for the team's loss of form compared with earlier races in the season. Herbert separated the Ferrari drivers in the second Benetton, also complaining of rear-end stability problems with his car. Eddie Irvine set the seventh quickest time in his Jordan despite suffering a recurring brake balance problem, ahead of Häkkinen in the faster of the two McLaren cars. This formation was continued on the fifth row of the grid, which was occupied by Rubens Barrichello in the other Jordan and Mark Blundell in the other McLaren. Brundle qualified in 11th position, more than a second in front of Ligier teammate Panis in 13th; both drivers complained that their cars rode the bumps on the track badly. The two were split by Frentzen in the quicker of the two Sauber drivers, who set a best time 1.5 seconds faster than his own teammate, Jean-Christophe Boullion, in 16th. Ukyo Katayama was 14th quickest for the Tyrrell team, ahead of Pierluigi Martini's Minardi, the latter's best qualifying performance of the season. Behind Boullion, Papis set the 17th fastest time in his first Formula One qualifying session, split from teammate Taki Inoue by Luca Badoer in the second Minardi, who was unable to complete his allocated laps after spinning and breaking the car's gearbox. The times were completed by Diniz and Moreno in the Forti cars, who sandwiched Bertrand Gachot's Pacific car. Two drivers failed to set times: Mika Salo failed to stop his Tyrrell at the pit-lane weighbridge despite the presence of a red light—indicating that his car had been selected to be weighed—and the stewards excluded his times as a result. Andrea Montermini did not take part in the session at all due to a failure of his car's brake master cylinder; the underfunded Pacific team lacked the resources to bring a spare car to the event.

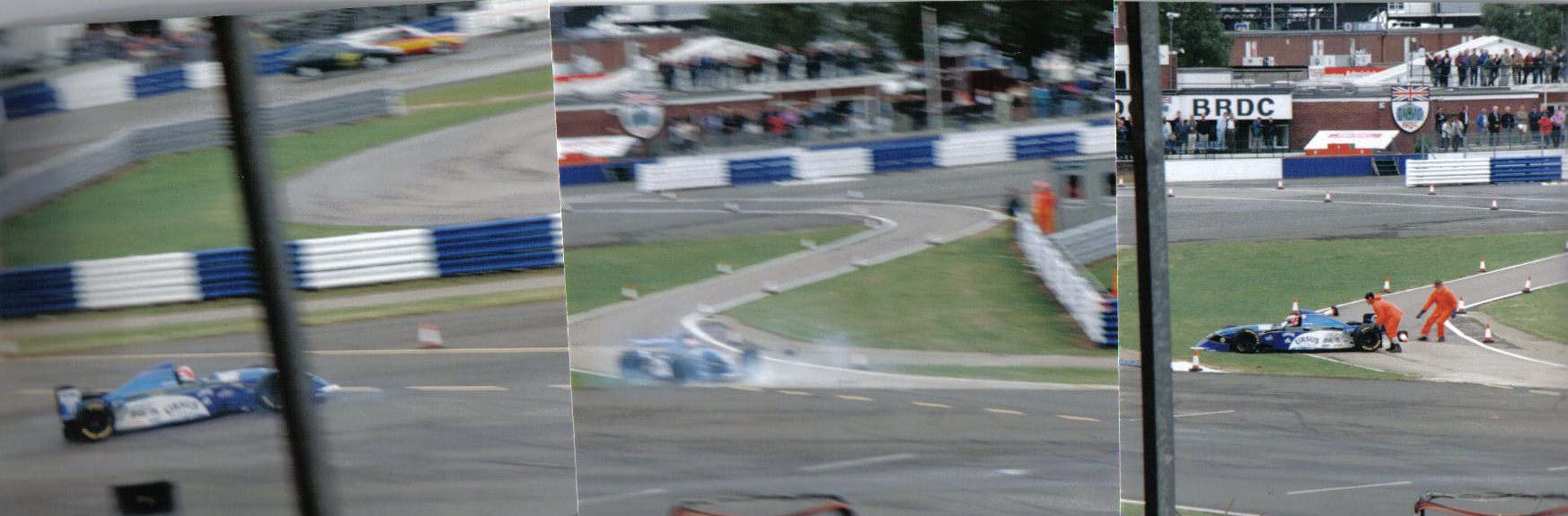
Andrea Montermini spun during Saturday's free practice session.

Saturday free practice took place in mixed weather conditions: the session was initially dry, but was then hit by a rain shower which dampened it somewhat; the times were thus slower and more spread out down the field than the previous day. Schumacher set the fastest time of 1:31.390, and said that he believed that his car's handling was much improved compared with its performance on Friday. He was followed by Alesi, Coulthard, Herbert, Panis and Frentzen. Hill was left in 22nd position as a result of spinning off in the difficult conditions and then breaking his car's transmission as he attempted to restart. Alesi had a controversial session: he set a fast time under yellow flag conditions for Hill's spin. He later tangled with Gachot's Pacific and recovered to the pit entry at high speed, where he had to spin to avoid marshals who were pushing the other Pacific of Montermini back to its garage. The race stewards witnessed the incident, but mistakenly called up Alesi's teammate, Berger, instead. Alesi, once the correct identity of the driver involved had been established, was not penalised.

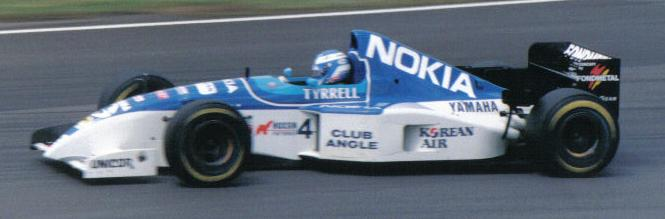
Mika Salo's Friday times were disallowed for a rule infringement; the wet weather the following day restricted him to 23rd place on the grid.

"A lot of TV networks have realised that qualifying can be a highlight of the weekend. We had 30 countries taking live feed from Silverstone and the viewers were sitting there watching nothing. We have to do something about that and it will be discussed by the F1 commission.
There are two potential solutions. One is to have an aggregate of the Friday and Saturday times, meaning that teams have to perform regardless, and the second is to have qualifying on Saturday only. It is just my opinion, but I'd prefer the second option. You could have timed sessions on Friday which did not count for the grid because, to me, Friday is a huge waste of time."

— FIA President Max Mosley, commenting on problems with the existing qualifying format that were highlighted by the wet conditions on Saturday.

It continued to rain throughout Saturday's qualifying session; the slower conditions meant that none of the top 24 drivers could improve upon their times from the previous day, setting the order of the starting grid and guaranteeing Hill pole position. Only Salo and Montermini's times counted for their starting positions: the Tyrrell driver set the fourth-fastest time of the session, albeit 12 seconds slower than Moreno's dry-weather Friday time, to take 23rd position on the grid; Montermini set a time almost four seconds slower again to complete the field. Many teams chose to complete only limited running in the wet conditions, to the frustration of the crowd: Häkkinen, Inoue and Gachot did not set a time, whilst Blundell, Diniz and Martini completed only exploratory laps. There was also frustration amongst the drivers and teams who felt that they had underperformed on Friday, and for Häkkinen and Irvine who had both been scheduled to run with more powerful engines which should have given an advantage in dry conditions. The Benetton mechanics also had a busy session: first Schumacher slid off the road at Stowe corner and had to rejoin the track by using part of the old circuit; then Herbert lost control of his car on standing water at the fast Copse corner, spearing off the road into a heavy impact against the tyre barriers. Herbert was uninjured and the Benetton mechanics were able to repair the B195's monocoque. Coulthard set the quickest time of the session with a lap of 1:29.752, ahead of Schumacher, Alesi and Salo, with Hill, Barrichello, Brundle, Badoer, Irvine and Frentzen completing the top ten. Hill admitted that the wet session was "a bit of a let-down", and was cautious on his race prospects, as he had failed to win from his two pole positions earlier in the season, but was delighted with the outcome nonetheless. Schumacher was also disappointed with the weather conditions, but was optimistic that his car was fully competitive in either the dry or wet.

The lack of on-track action caused by the wet conditions and the two-day qualifying system was a cause for concern amongst the Formula One paddock, members of which believed that members of the public who had paid to attend the session (spectator numbers were estimated at 40,000), or watch it on television, were being short-changed as a result. McLaren team principal Ron Dennis argued that the restriction on the use of the teams' spare cars should be lifted in the event of wet weather conditions, whilst Pacific designer Frank Coppuck advocated a points system for qualifying, in addition to aggregating the times over both days. FIA President Max Mosley confirmed that the current qualifying procedure was to be the subject of a review, with possible changes due to be introduced for the 1996 season. One-day qualifying was subsequently introduced from the 1996 Australian Grand Prix onwards.

=== Qualifying classification ===
Pos	No	Driver	Constructor	Q1 Time	Q2 Time	Gap
1	5	(United Kingdom) Damon Hill	Williams-Renault	1:28.124	1:48.800	
2	1	(Germany) Michael Schumacher	Benetton-Renault	1:28.397	1:48.204	+0.273
3	6	(United Kingdom) David Coulthard	Williams-Renault	1:28.947	1:48.012	+0.823
4	28	(Austria) Gerhard Berger	Ferrari	1:29.657	1:51.818	+1.533
5	2	(United Kingdom) Johnny Herbert	Benetton-Renault	1:29.867	1:55.011	+1.743
6	27	(France) Jean Alesi	Ferrari	1:29.874	1:48.205	+1.750
7	15	(United Kingdom) Eddie Irvine	Jordan-Peugeot	1:30.083	1:51.045	+1.959
8	8	(Finland) Mika Häkkinen	McLaren-Mercedes	1:30.140	No time	+2.016
9	14	(Brazil) Rubens Barrichello	Jordan-Peugeot	1:30.354	1:49.152	+2.230
10	7	(United Kingdom) Mark Blundell	McLaren-Mercedes	1:30.453	56:10.060	+2.329
11	25	(United Kingdom) Martin Brundle	Ligier-Mugen-Honda	1:30.946	1:49.414	+2.822
12	30	(Germany) Heinz-Harald Frentzen	Sauber-Ford	1:31.602	1:51.059	+3.478
13	26	(France) Olivier Panis	Ligier-Mugen-Honda	1:31.842	1:51.657	+3.718
14	3	(Japan) Ukyo Katayama	Tyrrell-Yamaha	1:32.087	1:52.054	+3.963
15	23	(Italy) Pierluigi Martini	Minardi-Ford	1:32.259	2:13.471	+4.135
16	29	(France) Jean-Christophe Boullion	Sauber-Ford	1:33.166	1:51.086	+5.042
17	9	(Italy) Massimiliano Papis	Footwork-Hart	1:34.154	1:53.097	+6.030
18	24	(Italy) Luca Badoer	Minardi-Ford	1:34.556	1:50.959	+6.432
19	10	(Japan) Taki Inoue	Footwork-Hart	1:35.323	No time	+7.199
20	21	(Brazil) Pedro Diniz	Forti-Ford	1:36.023	5:51.829	+7.899
21	16	(France) Bertrand Gachot	Pacific-Ford	1:36.076	No time	+7.952
22	22	(Brazil) Roberto Moreno	Forti-Ford	1:36.651	1:56.374	+8.527
23	4	(Finland) Mika Salo	Tyrrell-Yamaha	No time	1:48.639	+20.515
24	17	(Italy) Andrea Montermini	Pacific-Ford	No time	1:52.398	+24.274

== Warm-up ==
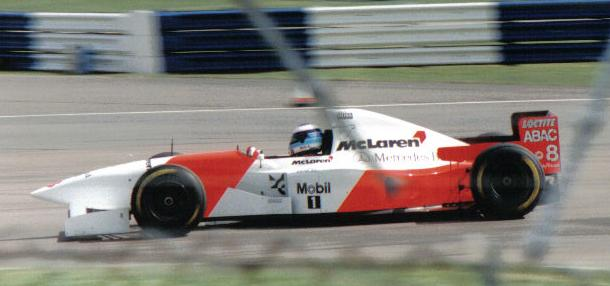
Mika Häkkinen used a new-specification Mercedes engine to set the fastest time in the warm-up session.

On Sunday morning, a pre-race warm-up session took place at 09:30 local time, and lasted for 30 minutes. It took place in dry weather conditions. Häkkinen, using his uprated Mercedes engine for the first time, set the session's fastest time with a lap of 1:29.685. Despite the fact that the time was set on brand-new tyres, unlike many of those recorded by the opposition, it was still an encouraging boost for the McLaren team, which had endured a troubled season thus far. He was followed in the timesheets by Hill, Coulthard, Alesi, Berger and Schumacher. Hill reported that his car handled well in race trim, whilst Schumacher concentrated on fuel consumption tests, and did not attempt to set a particularly quick time. Berger, meanwhile, downplayed Ferrari's chances, predicting that only a wet race would give either him or Alesi a chance of race victory. Herbert was down in 12th position as a result of a broken shock absorber, which was replaced in time for the race.

== Race ==
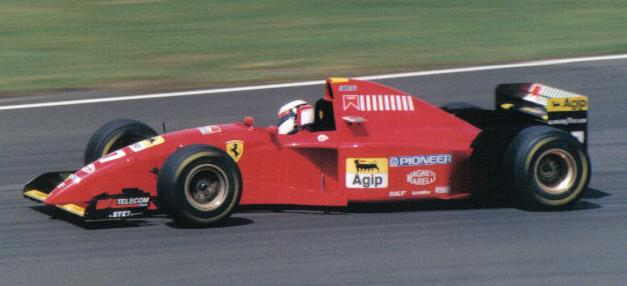
Jean Alesi made the best start, moving from sixth on the grid to second by the first corner.

It began to rain half an hour before the start of the race but soon stopped, so that the track was almost entirely dry by 14:00, with an ambient temperature of 22 °C (72 °F). A total of approximately 110,000 spectators attended the race, of whom 20,000 watched from grandstands. For the first time in the event's history, general admission tickets were limited, to ensure that all spectators could get a good view of the track. Whilst on a reconnaissance lap, Montermini performed an illegal practice start, for which Pacific was given a fine of $5,000, suspended for three races.

When the race started, Hill maintained his advantage into the first corner, whilst Alesi made a fast start to slot into second position ahead of Schumacher. Salo also had an excellent getaway, rising to 17th place by the end of the first lap. Berger and Irvine, meanwhile, made poor starts as they struggled with slipping clutches, dropping to ninth and 13th positions respectively. At the end of the first lap, Hill led by 1.1 seconds from Alesi, who was followed by Schumacher, Coulthard, Herbert, Häkkinen, Barrichello, Brundle, Berger, Frentzen, Blundell, Panis, Irvine, Martini, Katayama, Boullion, Salo, Papis, Inoue, Gachot, Badoer, Diniz, Montermini and Moreno. On the second lap, Irvine tried to pass Panis at the Abbey chicane, but spun in the process and dropped further back, shortly before his engine cut out, making him the first retirement of the race. Elsewhere in the field, Berger passed Brundle, and Montermini moved ahead of Diniz. At the front of the pack, Hill was in control, extending his lead over Alesi to 6.2 seconds by lap 5 and to 12 seconds by lap 12. For his part, Schumacher was being held up by Alesi, the two cars running in formation in the early stages of the race. He was, however, unable to get close enough to attempt an overtaking manoeuvre, due to the aerodynamic turbulence created by the airflow over the Ferrari. There were passing opportunities further down the order, however: Blundell and Panis both overhauled Frentzen in the early laps; Katayama and Boullion moved ahead of Martini; and Badoer passed Gachot. At the tail of the field, Diniz made the first of three pit stops on lap 6 to investigate gear selection problems with his Forti from which he retired eight laps later, and his teammate Moreno also made an early stop on the tenth lap but continued, albeit one lap down on the leader.

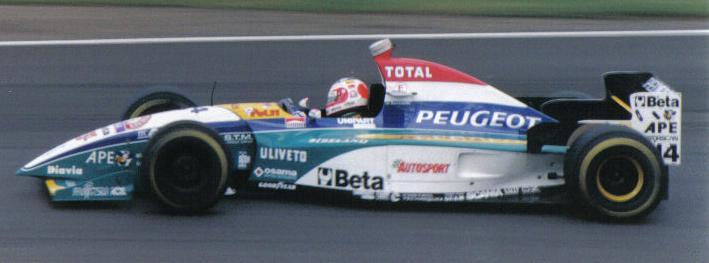
Rubens Barrichello was penalised for a jump-start, and later collided with Mark Blundell.

As Hill extended his lead, the stewards informed the Jordan and Ligier teams that Barrichello and Panis had jumped the start, for which they were served with ten-second stop-go penalties. Both drivers had previously been penalised for the same offence at the French Grand Prix, and also the Monaco Grand Prix. Panis took his penalty on lap 12 and dropped from 11th to 14th position; Barrichello made a pit stop to serve his identical penalty three laps later, from seventh place, and rejoined in 11th. Both drivers later protested their innocence. Lap 15 also saw the first scheduled pit stop, as Coulthard, also held up by Alesi behind Schumacher, took on fresh fuel and tyres earlier than planned in a bid to move ahead of the Ferrari when it made its own visit to the pit lane. As he rejoined the race, Coulthard's Williams suffered an electronic failure that affected the car's throttle control when changing gears, but continued the race in ninth place regardless. The next few laps saw a flurry of activity in the pit lane as those drivers on two-stop strategies made pit stops at around one-third race distance, and also several retirements. On lap 17, Brundle spun out of seventh place at Luffield and beached his car in the gravel trap, and Inoue retired from 18th position after a similar mistake resulted in a stalled engine. On the same lap, Montermini made a pit stop from 19th place, which he maintained upon rejoining the race. On the following lap, Alesi made his pit stop from second position, releasing Schumacher, and rejoined in front of Coulthard, whilst Barrichello, recovering from his penalty, passed Frentzen for what had become eighth place.

Schumacher slowly began to reduce Hill's lead, which had grown to 19.5 seconds. Salo made a pit stop on lap 19, dropping behind Papis and the Minardi drivers, but gained a position on Boullion when the Sauber driver stopped on the next lap. By this stage Häkkinen and Berger had risen to fourth and fifth respectively, but both retired on lap 21: Häkkinen's McLaren suffering a progressive electronic problem which caused its hydraulic system to fail; Berger pulling off the track shortly after making his first pit stop due to an incorrectly fitted left-front wheel. The remaining two-stoppers made pit stops on laps 21 and 22: Herbert came in from third place and retained his position by rejoining ahead of Alesi and Coulthard; Blundell dropped from fourth to seventh, Gachot retained 16th; and Barrichello and Panis made their first scheduled stops, the Jordan dropping from seventh to eighth and the Ligier rejoining in 11th from ninth. At the head of the field, Hill came in on lap 22, rejoining nine seconds behind Schumacher, who now led the race. Two further retirements also occurred during this stage of the race: Montermini spun out of 17th place on lap 22, whilst Katayama, who was due in for a pit stop of his own, retired from eighth position when his engine cut due to fuel starvation on the following lap. At the end of lap 23, the running order was Schumacher, Hill, Herbert, Alesi, Coulthard, Frentzen, Blundell, Barrichello, Martini, Papis, Panis, Badoer, Salo, Boullion, Gachot and Moreno.

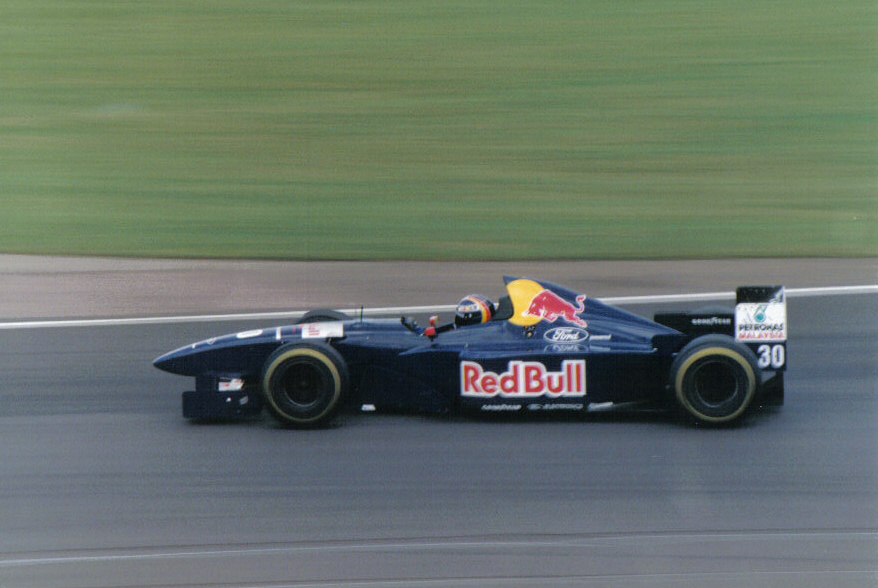
Heinz-Harald Frentzen was one of the few drivers to opt for a single pit-stop strategy, which proved to be faster than making two stops.

On new tyres, Hill began to reduce Schumacher's nine-second lead, but after a few laps Schumacher began to ease away again as he had a lighter fuel load than the Williams. It became apparent to the teams, as the race approached half-distance, that Schumacher had opted for a one-stop strategy and that both he and Hill only had one stop remaining each. Frentzen, Papis and the Minardi drivers also opted for a single-stop race; Papis and Martini's worn tyres allowing Panis to overtake them soon after his second stop. Papis made his first Formula One race pit stop on lap 28, only to hit the barrier at the exit of the pit lane, causing damage to his Footwork's suspension which caused him to spin off and retire on the same lap that he rejoined the circuit. On the next lap Frentzen dropped from sixth to eighth position as a result of his sole stop, and was then passed by Panis four laps later; Martini likewise dropped from 10th to 13th on lap 30; and Badoer also moved from 10th to 13th when he made his stop on lap 32.

At the front of the field, Hill moved back into the lead of the race when Schumacher made his pit stop on lap 31, rejoining in second place with a deficit of 20 seconds. Hill now pushed hard in his efforts to build up a sufficient lead over Schumacher—setting the race's fastest lap time of 1:29.752 on lap 37—to maintain first place after his second pit stop. Salo began the second round of pit stops on the next lap, and was followed in due course by Alesi, Herbert, Barrichello, Boullion, Gachot, Blundell, Panis and Coulthard. Coulthard's stop, despite moving him ahead of Alesi, was problematic: his car's electronic failure meant that his pit-lane speed-limiter system did not work, and he exceeded the 80 kilometres per hour (50 mph) pit-lane speed limit, an infraction of the Sporting Regulations which, like jumping the start, entailed a ten-second stop-go penalty. Hill made his own second stop on lap 41 with a 27-second lead over Schumacher and the two were almost level as Hill reached the end of the pit lane, but Schumacher's extra momentum allowed him to move ahead in the run to the Maggotts, Becketts and Chapel sequence of fast corners. At the completion of the scheduled pit stops by lap 44, the running order was Schumacher and Hill in close attendance, then a gap back to a similar battle between Herbert and Coulthard, then Alesi, Blundell, Barrichello, Panis, Frentzen—whom Panis had just passed for the third time—Martini, Badoer, Salo, Boullion, Gachot and Moreno, the last of whom retired four laps later with a lack of hydraulic pressure in his Forti's pneumatic engine valves.

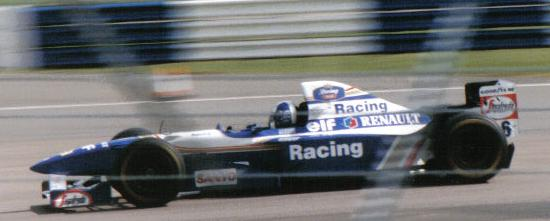
David Coulthard took the lead in the closing stages of the race, but was penalised for speeding in the pit lane.

Schumacher and Hill now had similar fuel loads, but Hill had a fresh set of tyres and immediately began pressuring Schumacher, quickly reducing the gap to less than half-a-second. On lap 46, Hill attempted a passing manoeuvre at Stowe corner, but was unable to complete it, due to the presence of Boullion's lapped Sauber. Further around the lap, Hill tried again, diving up the inside of Schumacher at the entry to the Priory left-hander, but Schumacher turned in to take the racing line and the two collided, both spinning into the gravel trap, which caused their retirement from the race. The retirement of the two leaders promoted their teammates into their own battle for the lead; the two almost colliding at the same corner as Coulthard attempted to pass Herbert by making a lunge up the inside of his car, as Hill had done to Schumacher. Coulthard had not been informed about his stop-go penalty by the team, as they did not want to distract him, but he saw the penalty notification on one of the large television screens situated around the circuit. He passed Herbert on lap 49, but took his penalty two laps later and dropped to third position, behind Alesi. The Ferrari driver was still close behind Herbert, but cut his pace in the final laps as his 412T2's oil pressure began to fade. With the top three positions settled, attention switched to Barrichello, who had closed up to the back of Blundell's car and was faster than the McLaren driver. On the penultimate lap, Barrichello lined up his car to attempt a pass, but Blundell defended his position and the two collided: Barrichello crashed out, but Blundell was able to continue with a punctured left-rear tyre which allowed Panis to overtake him on the last lap. It was the second year in succession that Barrichello had collided with a McLaren driver in the closing stages, as he had made contact with Häkkinen on the last corner of the last lap the previous year when also battling for fourth place.

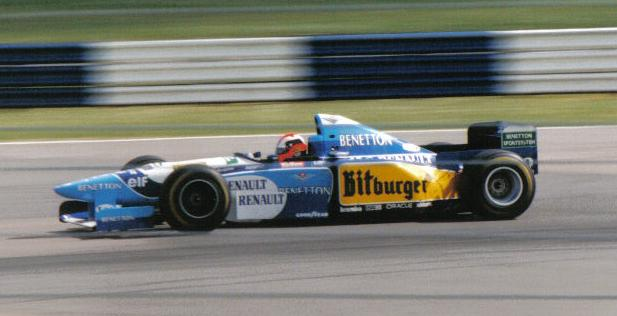
Johnny Herbert took the first win of his Formula One career.

Thus Herbert took the chequered flag after 61 laps—at an average speed of 195.682 kilometres per hour (121.591 mph)—to win his first Formula One race at his 74th attempt, a result that also moved him from sixth to fourth in the Drivers' Championship. Alesi and Coulthard completed the podium, moving Ferrari ahead of Williams in the battle for second place in the Constructors' Championship. Panis finished fourth, ahead of Blundell, who managed to finish despite his car running on three wheels for the final lap. Frentzen finished a lap down and completed the points-scoring positions, forty seconds ahead of a close group comprising Martini, Salo and Boullion. Salo closed in on the Minardi driver late in the race after passing his teammate, but was edged onto the grass whilst attempting a pass on the Hangar Straight and spun through 360 degrees. Badoer finished a further ten seconds behind this group, having also been passed by Boullion after his final pit stop. Barrichello was classified in 11th place, ahead of Gachot, who took his first race finish since the 1992 Belgian Grand Prix three laps behind Herbert.

== Post-race ==
"The feeling I got here was fantastic, especially to do it here in England, my own country. The support I got from the fans was fantastic, and I realise now what Nigel Mansell and Damon Hill meant when they talked about it.
As soon as I was in the lead, the crowd starting waving Union Jacks all the way round the circuit, but I just concentrated on the job. I was thinking about the car and everything that could go wrong in the last ten laps. But it all kept going. I should have had a bet on myself, as I was being offered at 25 to 1 for a win, but I didn't do it. I should have had more confidence in myself. But now I think this win should be a good boost for my career and I'll feel a lot more confident from now on."

— Johnny Herbert, commenting on his first Formula One race victory.

Herbert's maiden Formula One victory was very popular amongst the spectators and team personnel, as not only was it his home race, but also because it came after a series of setbacks earlier in his career, not least a serious accident in an International Formula 3000 race at Brands Hatch in 1988 that left him with severe foot injuries which threatened his racing career. In the post-race press conference, Herbert paid tribute to three people who had particularly helped the progress of his career: his wife, Becky; Peter Collins, of whom Herbert said that "he got me into F1 twice"; and Benetton team principal Flavio Briatore for giving him his 1995 drive. Herbert's win also came in front of his parents, Bob and Jane, who were selling his fan club merchandise at the circuit during the race meeting. In addition, the victory secured his immediate future within the Benetton team. Alesi declared himself "very happy" with his second place, but admitted to "giving up" in the second half of the race, as he knew that overtaking Herbert or Coulthard when they were ahead of him would have been almost impossible. For Coulthard, his result was bittersweet: he was pleased to finish the race despite the failure of his car's electronics, but disappointed to lose an almost certain victory due to his pit-lane speeding penalty. A few days later, he described his race in a magazine column as "one of those disappointing days when everything goes wrong".

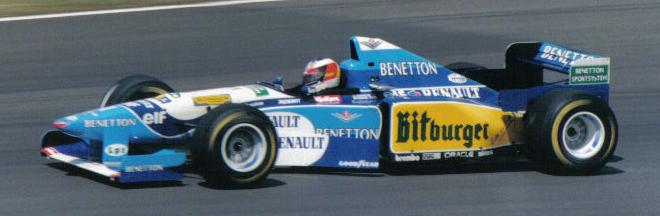
Michael Schumacher blamed Hill for their collision on lap 46.

The majority of media attention, however, was focussed on the aftermath of the collision between Schumacher and Hill on lap 46. Tension between the two had already been intensified by an incident during the French Grand Prix, where Schumacher had accused Hill of brake-testing him. After the crash, Schumacher blamed Hill, saying that: "I think what Damon did was both stupid and totally unnecessary. There was no room for two cars there, and it's not an overtaking place. If I hadn't been there, I think he'd have gone straight on into the gravel. He just came from nowhere. Even in front of your home crowd, I think you have to keep your temperament under control. It was more or less the same situation at Adelaide last year [the occasion of the 1994 Australian Grand Prix, in which a collision between the two settled the Drivers' Championship in Schumacher's favour], where he also tried to dive inside when there was no room." Hill was more cautious in his assessment of the incident, commenting that: "I thought I saw an opportunity that I could take an advantage of, but I'm afraid Michael is a harder man to pass than that, and we had an accident—which I would describe as 'a racing accident'". Journalists Alan Henry, Nigel Roebuck and Luc Domenjoz agreed that Hill's lunge up the inside had been over-optimistic, but not malicious in intent.

Similarly, BBC commentator and former driver, Jonathan Palmer, said that Hill's manoeuvre was the result of "a rush of blood to the head". Journalist Joe Saward was amongst those who speculated, however, that Schumacher had played a role in the collision by taking a wider line into the Priory corner than usual, and thus encouraging Hill to attempt the manoeuvre. The incident was subject to a stewards' investigation, which resulted in both drivers being given a severe reprimand and a warning that "future similar actions may result in severe penalties". The collision overshadowed the fact that, in the opinion of Roebuck, Benetton had again chosen a better race strategy than Williams, and that Schumacher would have had a comfortable lead had he not been stuck behind Alesi in the early stages of the race. There was also similar ill-feeling between Barrichello and Blundell after their collision on lap 60. Barrichello accused Blundell of brake-testing him prior to the incident, and of causing the crash by changing his driving line too quickly, whilst Blundell denied the allegations and drew attention to Barrichello's similar collision with Häkkinen the previous year. The stewards also investigated this incident and gave Blundell a severe reprimand for his actions.

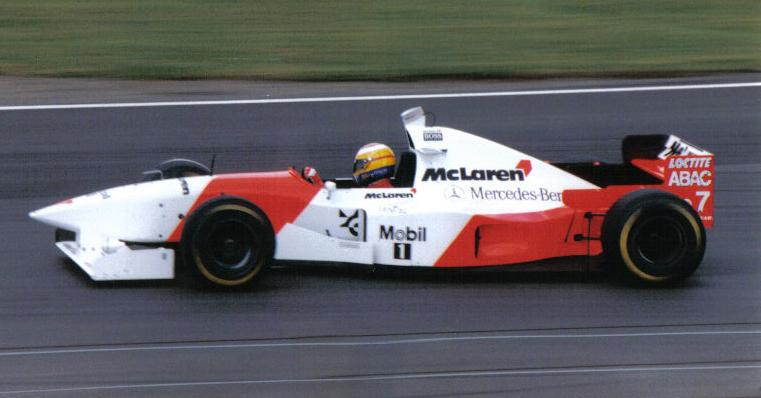
Blundell was issued with a severe reprimand by the race stewards for his part in the collision with Barrichello; a similar caution was given to Schumacher and Hill for their incident.

In the week following the race, it was reported in several British newspapers that Frank Williams, founder and team principal of the Williams team, had visited the Benetton garage after the race where he had apologised to Schumacher and Briatore for the incident, during which he had allegedly referred to Hill as a "prat". On the same day, a Williams team spokesman stated that Hill was backed by Frank Williams and technical director Patrick Head, and that the incident was a natural part of motor racing. Frank Williams then issued a personal statement denying the newspaper reports. Hill also telephoned the owner of Formula One's commercial rights, Bernie Ecclestone, for advice on how to handle the situation. Ecclestone advised him to apologise to Schumacher, which Hill decided against. The crash was still the main talking point throughout the sport by the time of the German Grand Prix, exacerbated by the fact that Hill's home race was immediately followed by Schumacher's.

=== Race classification ===
Pos	No	Driver	Constructor	Laps	Time/Retired	Grid	Points
1	2	(United Kingdom) Johnny Herbert	Benetton-Renault	61	1:34:35.093	5	10
2	27	(France) Jean Alesi	Ferrari	61	+16.479	6	6
3	6	(United Kingdom) David Coulthard	Williams-Renault	61	+23.888	3	4
4	26	(France) Olivier Panis	Ligier-Mugen-Honda	61	+1:33.168	13	3
5	7	(United Kingdom) Mark Blundell	McLaren-Mercedes	61	+1:48.172	10	2
6	30	(Germany) Heinz-Harald Frentzen	Sauber-Ford	60	+1 lap	12	1
7	23	(Italy) Pierluigi Martini	Minardi-Ford	60	+1 lap	15	
8	4	(Finland) Mika Salo	Tyrrell-Yamaha	60	+1 lap	23	
9	29	(France) Jean-Christophe Boullion	Sauber-Ford	60	+1 lap	16	
10	24	(Italy) Luca Badoer	Minardi-Ford	60	+1 lap	18	
11	14	(Brazil) Rubens Barrichello	Jordan-Peugeot	59	Collision	9	
12	16	(France) Bertrand Gachot	Pacific-Ford	58	+3 laps	21	
Ret	22	(Brazil) Roberto Moreno	Forti-Ford	48	Engine	22	
Ret	1	(Germany) Michael Schumacher	Benetton-Renault	45	Collision	2	
Ret	5	(United Kingdom) Damon Hill	Williams-Renault	45	Collision	1	
Ret	9	(Italy) Massimiliano Papis	Footwork-Hart	28	Spun off/suspension	17	
Ret	3	(Japan) Ukyo Katayama	Tyrrell-Yamaha	22	Out of fuel	14	
Ret	17	(Italy) Andrea Montermini	Pacific-Ford	21	Spun off	24	
Ret	8	(Finland) Mika Häkkinen	McLaren-Mercedes	20	Electrical	8	
Ret	28	(Austria) Gerhard Berger	Ferrari	20	Wheel	4	
Ret	25	(United Kingdom) Martin Brundle	Ligier-Mugen-Honda	16	Spun off	11	
Ret	10	(Japan) Taki Inoue	Footwork-Hart	16	Spun off	19	
Ret	21	(Brazil) Pedro Diniz	Forti-Ford	13	Gearbox	20	
Ret	15	(United Kingdom) Eddie Irvine	Jordan-Peugeot	2	Electrical	7	

== Championship standings after the race ==
Drivers' Championship standings

	Pos	Driver	Points
	1	(Germany) Michael Schumacher	46
	2	(United Kingdom) Damon Hill	35
	3	(France) Jean Alesi	32
2	4	(United Kingdom) Johnny Herbert	22
	5	(United Kingdom) David Coulthard	17

Constructors' Championship standings

	Pos	Constructor	Points
	1	(United Kingdom) Benetton-Renault	58
	2	(Italy) Ferrari	49
	3	(United Kingdom) Williams-Renault	46
	4	(Republic of Ireland) Jordan-Peugeot	13
1	5	(France) Ligier-Mugen-Honda	10

- Note: Only the top five positions are included for both sets of standings.

Previous race: 1995 French Grand Prix	FIA Formula One World Championship; 1995 season	Next race: 1995 German Grand Prix
Previous race: 1994 British Grand Prix	British Grand Prix	Next race: 1996 British Grand Prix
