= 1996 Monaco Grand Prix =

6th round of the 1996 Formula One season

Coordinates: 43°44′4.74″N 7°25′16.8″E

Race 6 of 16 in the 1996 Formula One World Championship
← Previous race	Next race →
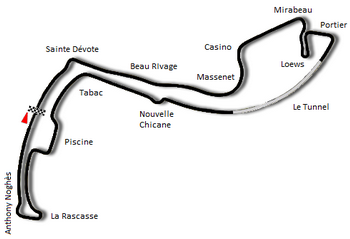

Race details
- Date: 19 May 1996
- Official name: LIV Grand Prix Automobile de Monaco
- Location: Circuit de Monaco, Monte Carlo
- Course: Street circuit
- Course length: 3.328 km (2.068 miles)
- Distance: 75 laps, 249.600 km (155.094 miles)
- Scheduled distance: 78 laps, 259.584 km (161.298 miles)
- Weather: Overcast, mild, wet at first, drying later, light rain at finish

Pole position
Driver	(Germany) Michael Schumacher	Ferrari
- Time: 1:20.356

Fastest lap
Driver	(France) Jean Alesi	Benetton-Renault
- Time: 1:25.205 on lap 59

Podium
First	(France) Olivier Panis	Ligier-Mugen-Honda
Second	(United Kingdom) David Coulthard	McLaren-Mercedes
Third	(United Kingdom) Johnny Herbert	Sauber-Ford

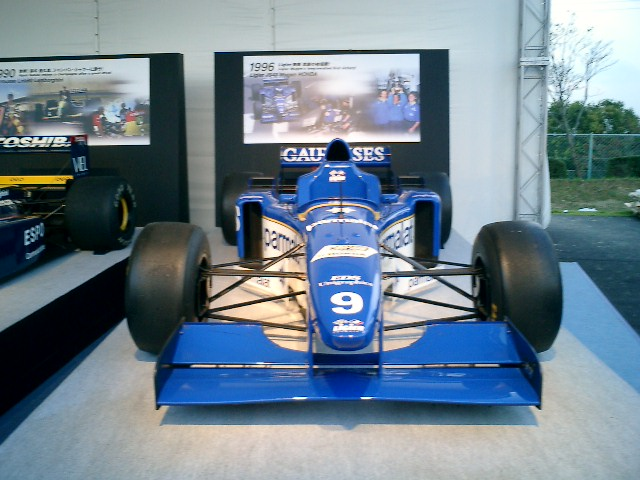
JS43 of the type driven by Olivier Panis at the 1996 Monaco Grand Prix, on display.

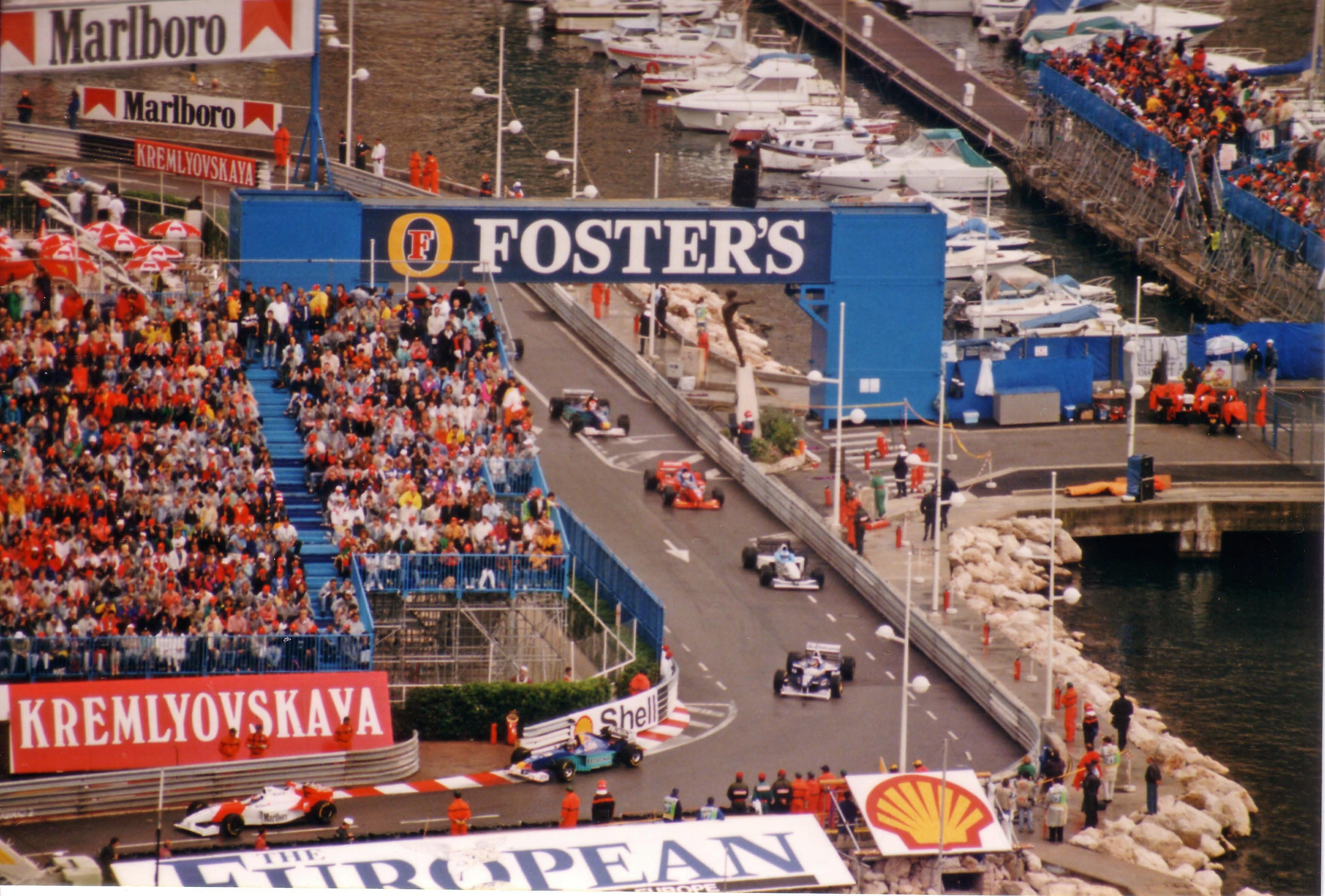
Formation lap

The 1996 Monaco Grand Prix (formally the LIV Grand Prix Automobile de Monaco) was a Formula One motor race held at Monaco on 19 May 1996. It was the sixth race of the 1996 Formula One season. The race was run in wet conditions, and set a record for the fewest cars to be running at the end of a Grand Prix race, with the three podium finishers being the only drivers who finished the race.

Olivier Panis scored his first and only win of his Formula One career, earning the last Formula One victory for the Ligier team, and the first win for engine manufacturer Mugen-Honda, after switching to slick tyres in a well-timed pitstop. Second place went to David Coulthard in a McLaren-Mercedes. Johnny Herbert was the last finisher in a Sauber, scoring his only points of the season.

This was the last win by a French Formula One driver until Pierre Gasly won the 2020 Italian Grand Prix. This was also the only win by a team outside the "Big Four" teams (McLaren, Williams, Benetton, and Ferrari) between the 1988 and the 1997 season and the last Grand Prix win by a car built in France.

== Practice and qualifying ==
Michael Schumacher had taken pole position but had caused controversy on his slowing down lap when he impeded Gerhard Berger right at the end of the session. Coming out of the tunnel Schumacher was cruising slowly, acknowledging the crowd, while Berger was on a fast lap. Schumacher tried to get out of Berger's way but the Austrian had to spin at high speed to avoid the Ferrari, entering the chicane backwards.

The Ligiers were 14th and 17th in qualifying, both below their expectations after the team had mis-firing issues, preventing a top six position.

=== Qualifying classification ===
Pos	No	Driver	Constructor	Time
1	1	(Germany) Michael Schumacher	Ferrari	1:20.356
2	5	(United Kingdom) Damon Hill	Williams-Renault	1:20.866
3	3	(France) Jean Alesi	Benetton-Renault	1:20.918
4	4	(Austria) Gerhard Berger	Benetton-Renault	1:21.067
5	8	(United Kingdom) David Coulthard	McLaren-Mercedes	1:21.460
6	11	(Brazil) Rubens Barrichello	Jordan-Peugeot	1:21.504
7	2	(United Kingdom) Eddie Irvine	Ferrari	1:21.542
8	7	(Finland) Mika Häkkinen	McLaren-Mercedes	1:21.688
9	15	(Germany) Heinz-Harald Frentzen	Sauber-Ford	1:21.929
10	6	(Canada) Jacques Villeneuve	Williams-Renault	1:21.963
11	19	(Finland) Mika Salo	Tyrrell-Yamaha	1:22.235
12	17	(Netherlands) Jos Verstappen	Footwork-Hart	1:22.327
13	14	(United Kingdom) Johnny Herbert	Sauber-Ford	1:22.346
14	9	(France) Olivier Panis	Ligier-Mugen-Honda	1:22.358
15	18	(Japan) Ukyo Katayama	Tyrrell-Yamaha	1:22.460
16	12	(United Kingdom) Martin Brundle	Jordan-Peugeot	1:22.519
17	10	(Brazil) Pedro Diniz	Ligier-Mugen-Honda	1:22.682
18	21	(Italy) Giancarlo Fisichella	Minardi-Ford	1:22.684
19	20	(Portugal) Pedro Lamy	Minardi-Ford	1:23.350
20	16	(Brazil) Ricardo Rosset	Footwork-Hart	1:24.976
21	22	(Italy) Luca Badoer	Forti-Ford	1:25.059
22	23	(Italy) Andrea Montermini	Forti-Ford	1:25.393
107% time: 1:25.981

== Warm up ==
Olivier Panis was fastest in the warm-up. Jacques Villeneuve was 18th after running a wet-setup in preparation for the expected rain. Between the warm-up session and the race, heavy rain fell at the circuit, and an additional 15-minute session was added to allow the drivers to get used to the changed conditions. It was the first time rain had fallen over the race weekend. The session took place at 13:15 CEST (GMT +2). Several drivers went off during the session, including Pedro Lamy, Pedro Diniz and Giancarlo Fisichella, but all continued. Mika Häkkinen and Andrea Montermini both damaged their cars. The damage that Montermini's caused his car, crashing coming out of the tunnel, prevented him from taking the start, due to the team lacking spare components. Jean Alesi suffered a puncture at the end of the session, but was able to return to the pitlane. Several drivers opted to skip the session. The Footwork team chose not to participate as they did not have any spare parts, and any crash would have marked the end of their weekend. Häkkinen was fastest, setting his time before his crash, with Alesi, Rubens Barrichello and Johnny Herbert behind. The two Williams cars were 7th and 8th, Villeneuve ahead of Damon Hill with Schumacher behind them in 9th.

== Race ==
The race started at 14:30 CEST. At the start, Hill overtook Schumacher into Sainte-Dévote, while further back Jos Verstappen slid straight into the wall, having opted to start the race on slicks. The two Minardis of Pedro Lamy and Giancarlo Fisichella were then eliminated when they tangled coming out of the first corner. Hill began to pull away while polesitter Schumacher lost control coming out of Lower Mirabeau and hit the wall. Coming into the Rascasse, Barrichello spun and retired. After five laps, there were 13 cars remaining as Ukyo Katayama (accident), Ricardo Rosset (accident) and Diniz (transmission) also retired. A significant gap began to open between the leaders and Eddie Irvine in fourth with a queue of eight cars forming behind him. Berger retired from third place on the 10th lap with gearbox trouble leaving 12 cars, while Heinz-Harald Frentzen damaged his front wing trying to pass Irvine, dropping to second to last position, ahead of Luca Badoer.

On lap 31, Martin Brundle spun off, which left 11 cars in the race. Three laps later, Irvine was passed when Panis forced his way through at the Loews hairpin. Irvine lost control, became stuck and had undone his seatbelts before he restarted his car with the assistance of the marshals. Hill had briefly lost the lead to Alesi when he made a pit stop on lap 30 to change to slicks as the track began to dry, but regained it a lap later when he reovertook Panis (who was still on wet tyres) on the track. Alesi made his pit stop shortly afterwards, allowing Hill to extend his lead to nearly 30 seconds and continue untroubled at the front until the 40th lap, when a failed oil pump caused his engine to blow coming out of the tunnel, his first retirement of the season. Alesi then led for 20 laps before his suspension failed, handing the lead to Panis. Luca Badoer was running six laps down in the Forti when he collided with Villeneuve at Mirabeau on lap 66, retiring both drivers.

The race did not run its full distance as the two-hour time limit came into effect. Panis was leading David Coulthard by a small margin with only five other cars behind them. Irvine spun at the same point that his teammate Schumacher had crashed, and as he tried to rejoin, he was hit by Mika Salo, who was in turn hit by Häkkinen. All three of them retired, leaving only four cars circulating, with Frentzen running last. The German decided to pull into the pits on the final lap as he was already last anyway, far behind everyone else who had taken the chequered flag. Panis thus won his one and only Grand Prix, taking Ligier's first win in 15 years. Frentzen, Salo and Häkkinen were classified in the final points positions while Irvine was credited with seventh place.

=== Race classification ===
Pos	No	Driver	Constructor	Laps	Time/Retired	Grid	Points
1	9	(France) Olivier Panis	Ligier-Mugen-Honda	75	2:00:45.629	14	10
2	8	(United Kingdom) David Coulthard	McLaren-Mercedes	75	+4.828	5	6
3	14	(United Kingdom) Johnny Herbert	Sauber-Ford	75	+37.503	13	4
4^{a}	15	(Germany) Heinz-Harald Frentzen	Sauber-Ford	74	Withdrawn	9	3
5^{b}	19	(Finland) Mika Salo	Tyrrell-Yamaha	70	Collision	11	2
6^{c}	7	(Finland) Mika Häkkinen	McLaren-Mercedes	70	Collision	8	1
7^{d}	2	(United Kingdom) Eddie Irvine	Ferrari	68	Collision	7	
Ret	6	(Canada) Jacques Villeneuve	Williams-Renault	66	Collision	10	
Ret	22	(Italy) Luca Badoer	Forti-Ford	60	Collision + Electrical	21	
Ret	3	(France) Jean Alesi	Benetton-Renault	60	Suspension	3	
Ret	5	(United Kingdom) Damon Hill	Williams-Renault	40	Engine	2	
Ret	12	(United Kingdom) Martin Brundle	Jordan-Peugeot	30	Accident	16	
Ret	4	(Austria) Gerhard Berger	Benetton-Renault	9	Gearbox	4	
Ret	10	(Brazil) Pedro Diniz	Ligier-Mugen-Honda	5	Transmission	17	
Ret	16	(Brazil) Ricardo Rosset	Footwork-Hart	3	Accident	20	
Ret	18	(Japan) Ukyo Katayama	Tyrrell-Yamaha	2	Accident	15	
Ret	1	(Germany) Michael Schumacher	Ferrari	0	Accident	1	
Ret	11	(Brazil) Rubens Barrichello	Jordan-Peugeot	0	Spun off	6	
Ret	20	(Portugal) Pedro Lamy	Minardi-Ford	0	Collision	19	
Ret	21	(Italy) Giancarlo Fisichella	Minardi-Ford	0	Collision	18	
Ret	17	(Netherlands) Jos Verstappen	Footwork-Hart	0	Accident	12	
DNS	23	(Italy) Andrea Montermini	Forti-Ford		Warm-up crash	22	

- ^a ^b ^c ^d - Heinz-Harald Frentzen, Mika Salo, Mika Häkkinen and Eddie Irvine did not complete the race but were classified as they had completed 90% of the race distance.

== Championship standings after the race ==
Drivers' Championship standings

Pos	Driver	Points
1	(United Kingdom) Damon Hill	43
2	(Canada) Jacques Villeneuve	22
3	(Germany) Michael Schumacher	16
4	(France) Olivier Panis	11
5	(France) Jean Alesi	11

Constructors' Championship standings

Pos	Constructor	Points
1	(United Kingdom) Williams-Renault	65
2	(Italy) Ferrari	25
3	(Italy) Benetton-Renault	18
4	(United Kingdom) McLaren-Mercedes	16
5	(France) Ligier-Mugen-Honda	11

- Note: Only the top five positions are included for both sets of standings.

Previous race: 1996 San Marino Grand Prix	FIA Formula One World Championship; 1996 season	Next race: 1996 Spanish Grand Prix
Previous race: 1995 Monaco Grand Prix	Monaco Grand Prix	Next race: 1997 Monaco Grand Prix
