= Ligier JS41 =

Formula One racing car

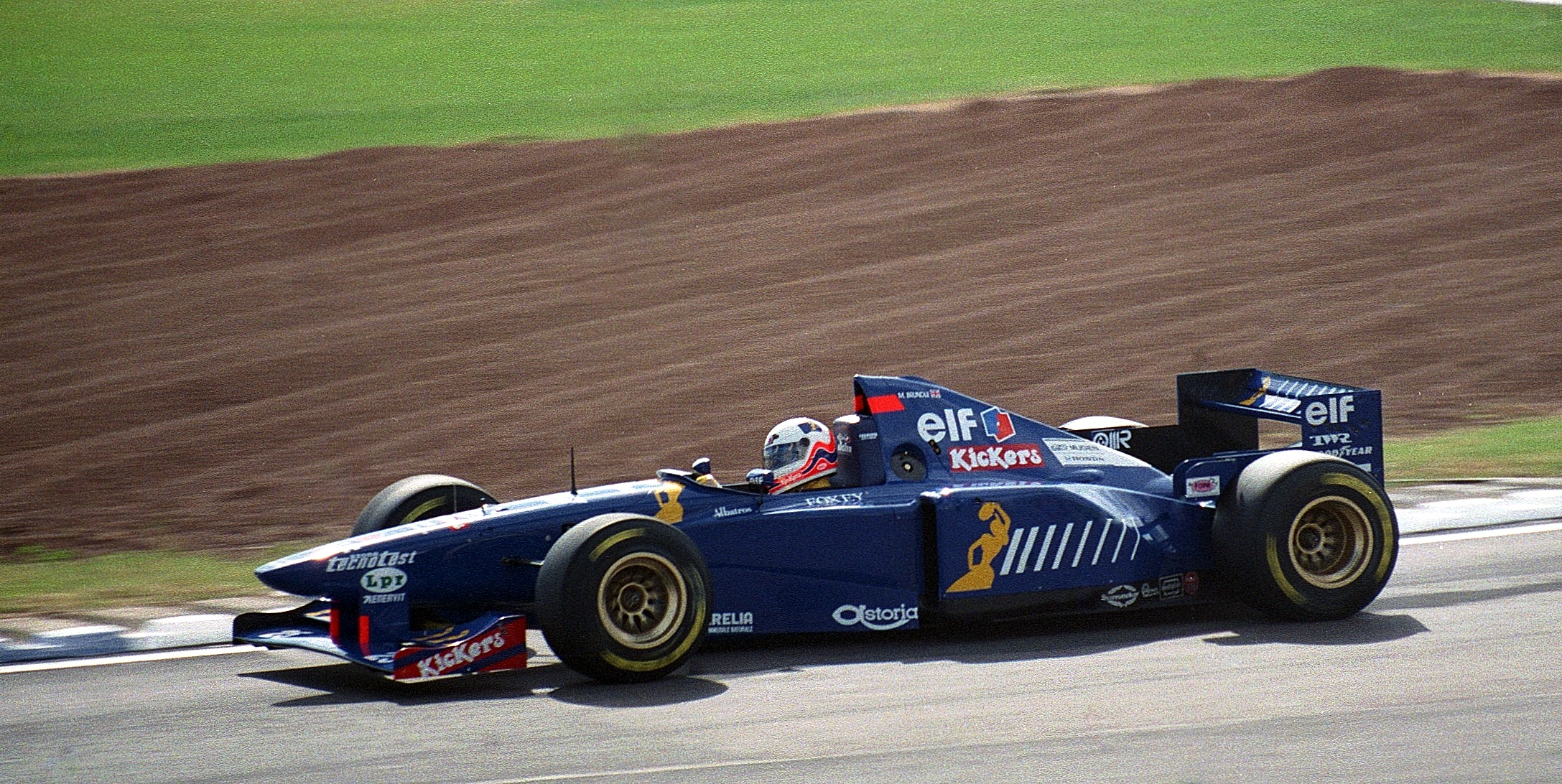
- Martin Brundle driving the JS41 at the 1995 British Grand Prix
- Category: Formula One
- Constructor: Ligier
- Designers: Frank Dernie (Technical Director); Loïc Bigois (Head of Aerodynamics)
- Predecessor: JS39
- Successor: JS43

Technical specifications
- Chassis: Carbon fibre and Kevlar monocoque
- Suspension (front): Double wishbone, pushrod
- Suspension (rear): Double wishbone, pushrod
- Engine: Mugen Honda MF-301H, 2,998 cc (182.9 cu in), 72° V10, NA, mid-engine, longitudinally-mounted
- Transmission: Benetton transverse 6-speed semi-automatic
- Power: 670 hp @ 13,500 rpm
- Fuel: Elf
- Tyres: Goodyear

Competition history
- Notable entrants: Ligier Gitanes Blondes
- Notable drivers: 25. (Japan) Aguri Suzuki; 25. (United Kingdom) Martin Brundle; 26. (France) Olivier Panis
- Debut: 1995 Brazilian Grand Prix
- Last event: 1995 Australian Grand Prix
Races	Wins	Podiums	Poles	F/Laps
17	0	2	0	0
- Constructors' Championships: 0
- Drivers' Championships: 0

The Ligier JS41 was a Formula One car designed by Frank Dernie for use by the Ligier team in the 1995 Formula One World Championship. The car was powered by the 3-litre Mugen-Honda MF-301 V10 engine. The number 26 car was driven by Frenchman Olivier Panis while, at the insistence of Mugen, the number 25 car was shared between Briton Martin Brundle and Japan's Aguri Suzuki. Another Frenchman, Franck Lagorce, served as the team's test driver.

Design-wise, the JS41 bore a striking resemblance to the Benetton B195. At the start of 1995, Ligier was part-owned by Benetton's director, Flavio Briatore. Briatore transferred the Renault engines Ligier had used for the previous three years to Benetton, in turn convincing Mugen to supply Ligier instead of Minardi. During the season, Briatore sold his shares in Ligier to Tom Walkinshaw, Benetton's engineering director. As a result, the JS41 was one of the most competitive Ligiers in years which allowed Brundle and Panis to regularly fight for points in races.

== Sponsorship and livery ==
The JS41 sporting a new dark blue colour instead of light shade blue. Gitanes was still the team's main sponsor. At the British and German Grands Prix, the Gitanes text were replaced with a barcode. At the French Grand Prix, the 'gypsy woman' logo was replaced with a man and a French flag along with "Ligier".

== Later use ==
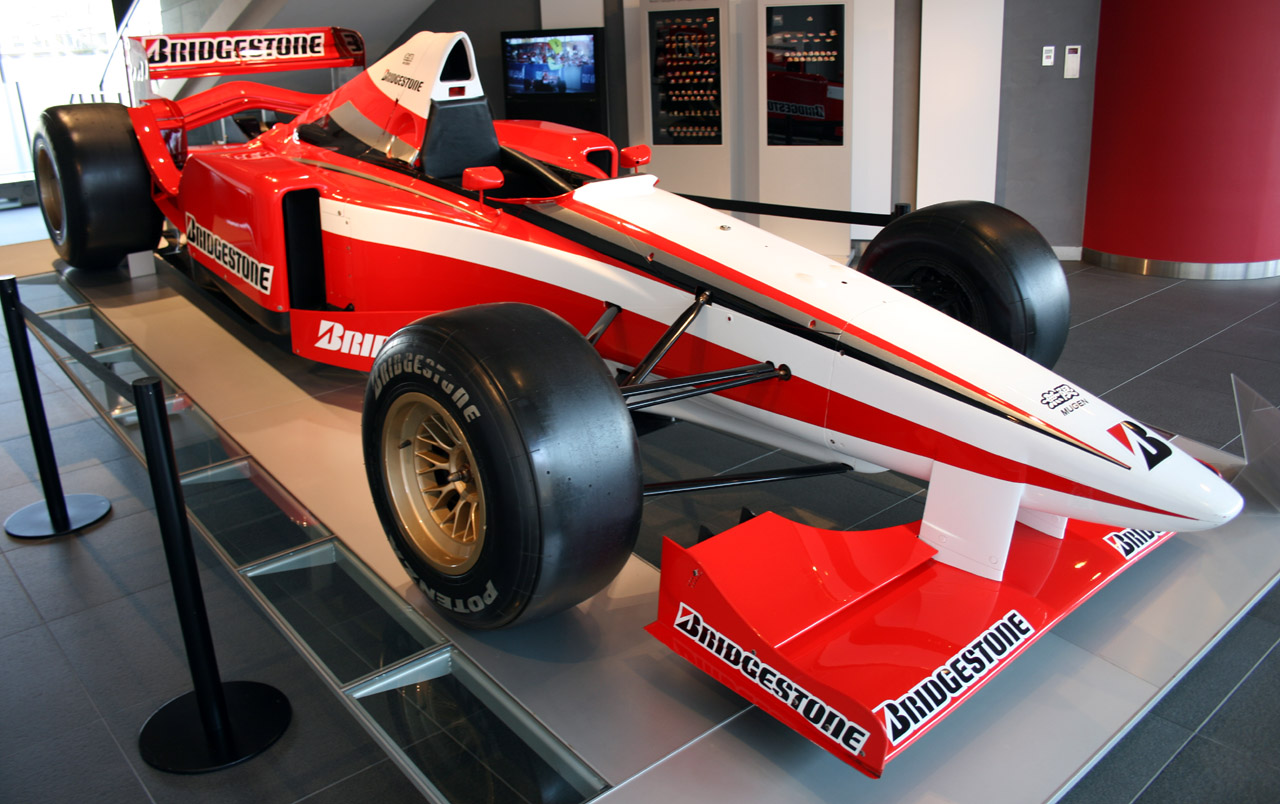
The JS41 test car used by Bridgestone

A JS41 was later bought by Bridgestone to test the Japanese company's tyres prior to its entry into Formula One in 1997.

== Complete Formula One results ==
(key)

Year	Team	Engine	Tyres	Drivers	1	2	3	4	5	6	7	8	9	10	11	12	13	14	15	16	17	Pts.	WCC
1995	Ligier Gitanes Blondes	Mugen Honda MF-301h; V10	G		BRA	ARG	SMR	ESP	MON	CAN	FRA	GBR	GER	HUN	BEL	ITA	POR	EUR	PAC	JPN	AUS	24	5th
1995	Ligier Gitanes Blondes	Mugen Honda MF-301h; V10	G	Aguri Suzuki	8	Ret	11						6						Ret	DNS		24	5th
1995	Ligier Gitanes Blondes	Mugen Honda MF-301h; V10	G	Martin Brundle				9	Ret	10*	4	Ret		Ret	3	Ret	8	7			Ret	24	5th
1995	Ligier Gitanes Blondes	Mugen Honda MF-301h; V10	G	Olivier Panis	Ret	7	9	6	Ret	4	8	4	Ret	6	9	Ret	Ret	Ret	8	5	2	24	5th
