= 1997 Canadian Grand Prix =

7th round of the 1997 Formula One season

Race 7 of 17 in the 1997 Formula One World Championship
← Previous race	Next race →

Race details
- Date: 15 June 1997
- Official name: XXXV Grand Prix Players du Canada
- Location: Circuit Gilles Villeneuve, Montreal, Quebec, Canada
- Course: Temporary street circuit
- Course length: 4.421 km (2.747 miles)
- Distance: 54 laps, 238.734 km (148.342 miles)
- Scheduled distance: 69 laps, 305.049 km (189.549 miles)
- Weather: Clear and mild with temperatures approaching 22.7 °C (72.9 °F); Wind speeds up to 4.1 km/h (2.5 mph)

Pole position
Driver	(Germany) Michael Schumacher	Ferrari
- Time: 1:18.095

Fastest lap
Driver	(United Kingdom) David Coulthard	McLaren-Mercedes
- Time: 1:19.635 on lap 37

Podium
First	(Germany) Michael Schumacher	Ferrari
Second	(France) Jean Alesi	Benetton-Renault
Third	(Italy) Giancarlo Fisichella	Jordan-Peugeot

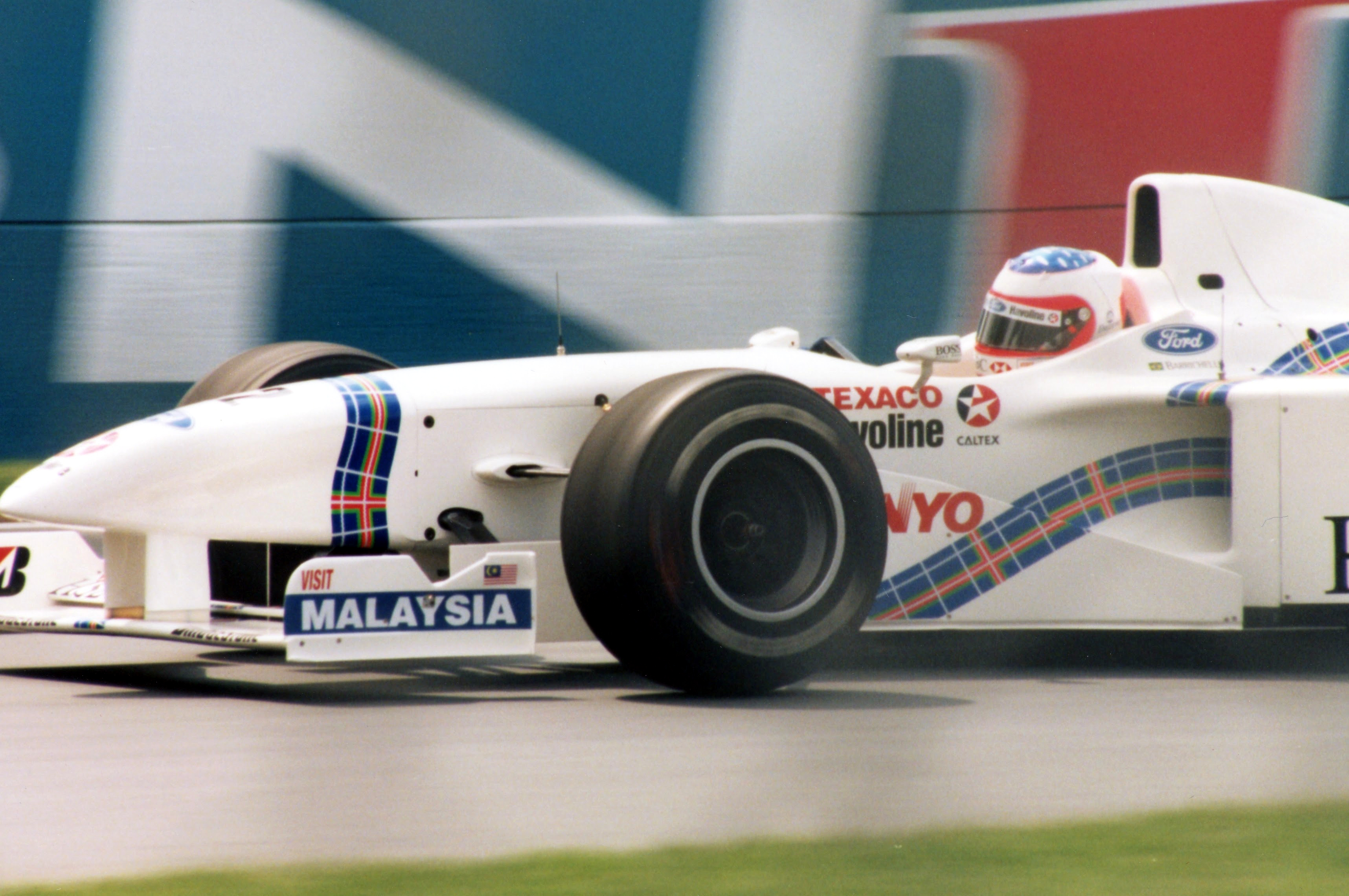
Barrichello on his way to third on the grid, but would retire in the race.

The 1997 Canadian Grand Prix was a Formula One motor race held at Circuit Gilles Villeneuve on 15 June 1997. The race was stopped early on lap 54 after a big crash involving Olivier Panis, who broke his legs and would be unable to start the next seven Grands Prix. Michael Schumacher won ahead of Jean Alesi in the Benetton and Giancarlo Fisichella in the Jordan. David Coulthard had been leading, but was delayed for over a lap by a clutch problem during his second pit stop, shortly before Panis's crash. On lap 2, local driver Jacques Villeneuve crashed into the wall on the exit of the final corner. This wall would later be known as the 'Wall of Champions', after three former World Champions, including Villeneuve, crashed into it separately in the 1999 race.

It also marked the debut of Alexander Wurz, driving for Benetton in place of his compatriot Gerhard Berger. Berger had been suffering from a sinus illness for some time and during his time off his father was killed in a light aircraft accident.

== Classification ==
=== Qualifying ===
The biggest surprise was Rubens Barrichello qualifying his Stewart on third spot, best position to the new team at that point. During the weekend the team tried an F-3000 rear wing to improve their downforce balance. The Brazilian was the best Bridgestone tyre supplied car qualifier; the second best was Frenchman Olivier Panis, only 10th.

Pos	No	Driver	Constructor	Time	Gap
1	5	(Germany) Michael Schumacher	Ferrari	1:18.095	
2	3	(Canada) Jacques Villeneuve	Williams-Renault	1:18.108	+0.013
3	22	(Brazil) Rubens Barrichello	Stewart-Ford	1:18.388	+0.293
4	4	(Germany) Heinz-Harald Frentzen	Williams-Renault	1:18.464	+0.369
5	10	(United Kingdom) David Coulthard	McLaren-Mercedes	1:18.466	+0.371
6	12	(Italy) Giancarlo Fisichella	Jordan-Peugeot	1:18.750	+0.655
7	11	(Germany) Ralf Schumacher	Jordan-Peugeot	1:18.869	+0.774
8	7	(France) Jean Alesi	Benetton-Renault	1:18.899	+0.804
9	9	(Finland) Mika Häkkinen	McLaren-Mercedes	1:18.916	+0.821
10	14	(France) Olivier Panis	Prost-Mugen-Honda	1:19.034	+0.939
11	8	(Austria) Alexander Wurz	Benetton-Renault	1:19.286	+1.191
12	6	(United Kingdom) Eddie Irvine	Ferrari	1:19.503	+1.408
13	16	(United Kingdom) Johnny Herbert	Sauber-Petronas	1:19.622	+1.527
14	18	(Netherlands) Jos Verstappen	Tyrrell-Ford	1:20.102	+2.007
15	1	(United Kingdom) Damon Hill	Arrows-Yamaha	1:20.129	+2.034
16	2	(Brazil) Pedro Diniz	Arrows-Yamaha	1:20.175	+2.080
17	19	(Finland) Mika Salo	Tyrrell-Ford	1:20.336	+2.241
18	17	(Italy) Gianni Morbidelli	Sauber-Petronas	1:20.357	+2.262
19	15	(Japan) Shinji Nakano	Prost-Mugen-Honda	1:20.370	+2.275
20	21	(Italy) Jarno Trulli	Minardi-Hart	1:20.370	+2.275
21	23	(Denmark) Jan Magnussen	Stewart-Ford	1:20.491	+2.396
22	20	(Japan) Ukyo Katayama	Minardi-Hart	1:21.034	+2.939
107% time: 1:23.562

=== Race ===
At the start, Eddie Irvine and Mika Häkkinen tangled at turn 2 and collected Jan Magnussen, with all three drivers immediately retiring. Rubens Barrichello made a bad start and dropped from third to seventh. On lap 2, local hero Jacques Villeneuve crashed out at the final chicane. Four laps later Ukyo Katayama retired and the Safety Car was deployed. The race resumed with both Tyrrell's drivers Jos Verstappen and Mika Salo passing Rubens Barrichello, running heavy on fuel on a one-stop strategy. When Ralf Schumacher retired, Jos Verstappen climbed to sixth place. The dream of the Dutchman to score his first point of the season faded away on lap 42; four laps later the same happened to his teammate.

At the front, Michael Schumacher established a gap around ten seconds to David Coulthard until his first stop. Then the McLaren driver took the lead until his only stop, dropping again to second, and coming back to the field around eight seconds behind the German. As the Ferrari driver needed a second stop to refueling, the lead would come back to Coulthard on lap 44. Schumacher exited the pit behind Olivier Panis and soon lapped the Frenchman, seventh at the time. However the German struggled on his new set of tyres and was unlapped by Panis, giving an even more comfortable lead to Coulthard.

Enjoying a reasonable gap to second spot and concerning about blistering on his left rear tyre, David Coulthard pitted for the second time, but his clutch failed and the car stalled on box. Thus, the lead came back to Michael Schumacher, at the same time that Olivier Panis crashed heavily on tyre barrier at turn 5, bringing out the Safety Car for the second time as well as the Medical Car.

The Frenchman was rapidly extracted from his Prost car and laid down with pain in his legs, leaving the track on an ambulance. Three laps later the race was red flagged and finished, giving Michael Schumacher the Championship lead, Giancarlo Fisichella his very first podium and Shinji Nakano his first Formula One career point.

Pos	No	Driver	Constructor	Laps	Time/Retired	Grid	Points
1	5	(Germany) Michael Schumacher	Ferrari	54	1:17:40.646	1	10
2	7	(France) Jean Alesi	Benetton-Renault	54	+2.565	8	6
3	12	(Italy) Giancarlo Fisichella	Jordan-Peugeot	54	+3.219	6	4
4	4	(Germany) Heinz-Harald Frentzen	Williams-Renault	54	+3.768	4	3
5	16	(United Kingdom) Johnny Herbert	Sauber-Petronas	54	+4.716	13	2
6	15	(Japan) Shinji Nakano	Prost-Mugen-Honda	54	+36.701	19	1
7	10	(United Kingdom) David Coulthard	McLaren-Mercedes	54	+37.753	5	
8	2	(Brazil) Pedro Diniz	Arrows-Yamaha	53	+1 lap	16	
9	1	(United Kingdom) Damon Hill	Arrows-Yamaha	53	+1 lap	15	
10	17	(Italy) Gianni Morbidelli	Sauber-Petronas	53	+1 lap	18	
11	14	(France) Olivier Panis	Prost-Mugen-Honda	51	Accident	10	
Ret	19	(Finland) Mika Salo	Tyrrell-Ford	46	Engine	17	
Ret	18	(Netherlands) Jos Verstappen	Tyrrell-Ford	42	Gearbox	14	
Ret	8	(Austria) Alexander Wurz	Benetton-Renault	35	Transmission	11	
Ret	22	(Brazil) Rubens Barrichello	Stewart-Ford	33	Gearbox	3	
Ret	21	(Italy) Jarno Trulli	Minardi-Hart	32	Engine	20	
Ret	11	(Germany) Ralf Schumacher	Jordan-Peugeot	14	Accident	7	
Ret	20	(Japan) Ukyo Katayama	Minardi-Hart	5	Throttle	22	
Ret	3	(Canada) Jacques Villeneuve	Williams-Renault	1	Accident	2	
Ret	9	(Finland) Mika Häkkinen	McLaren-Mercedes	0	Collision	9	
Ret	6	(United Kingdom) Eddie Irvine	Ferrari	0	Collision	12	
Ret	23	(Denmark) Jan Magnussen	Stewart-Ford	0	Accident	21	

== Championship standings after the race ==
Drivers' Championship standings

Pos	Driver	Points
1	(Germany) Michael Schumacher	37
2	(Canada) Jacques Villeneuve	30
3	(France) Olivier Panis	15
4	(United Kingdom) Eddie Irvine	14
5	(Germany) Heinz-Harald Frentzen	13

Constructors' Championship standings

Pos	Constructor	Points
1	(Italy) Ferrari	51
2	(United Kingdom) Williams-Renault	43
3	(Italy) Benetton-Renault	23
4	(United Kingdom) McLaren-Mercedes	21
5	(France) Prost-Mugen-Honda	16

As the consequence of Olivier Panis injuries, Italian Minardi driver Jarno Trulli was called to replace him at Prost Grand Prix, meanwhile Brazilian driver Tarso Marques, who had raced for Minardi in 1996, took Trulli seat at the Italian team.

- Note: Only the top five positions are included for both sets of standings.

Previous race: 1997 Spanish Grand Prix	FIA Formula One World Championship; 1997 season	Next race: 1997 French Grand Prix
Previous race: 1996 Canadian Grand Prix	Canadian Grand Prix	Next race: 1998 Canadian Grand Prix
