= Ferrari F310 =

1996-1997 Formula One racing car by Ferrari

Ferrari F310 Ferrari F310B
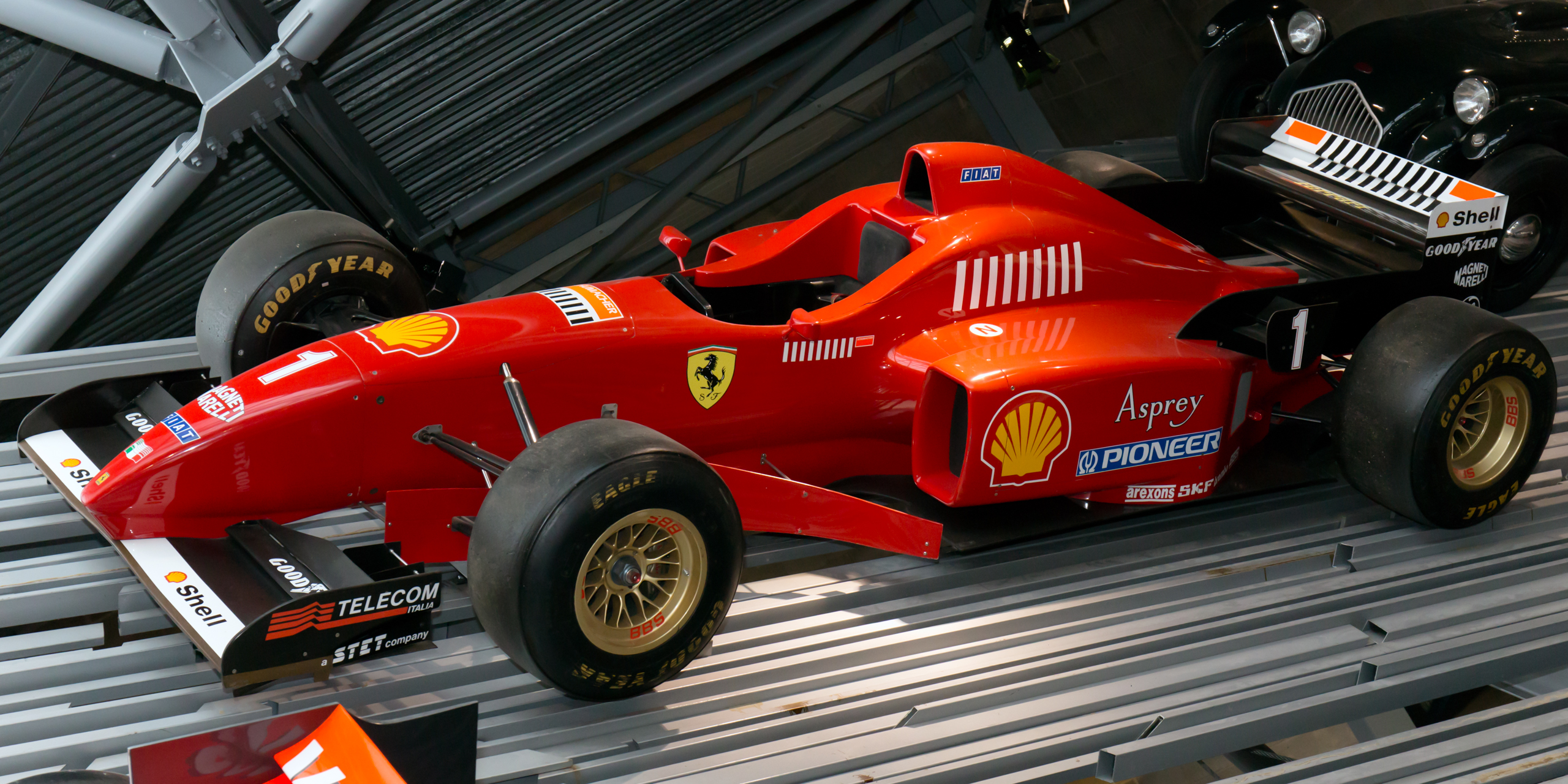
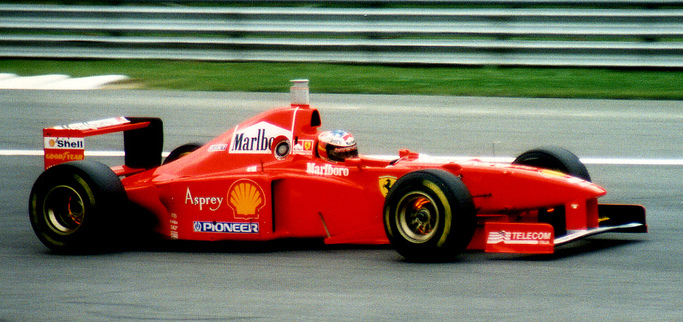
- The F310 on display at the National Motor Museum The F310B at the 1997 Italian Grand Prix
- Category: Formula One
- Constructor: Scuderia Ferrari
- Designers: John Barnard (Technical Director, F310); Ross Brawn (Technical Director, F310B); Gustav Brunner (Chief Designer, F310); Rory Byrne (Chief Designer, F310B); Aldo Costa (Head of Chassis Design); Willem Toet (Head of Aerodynamics); Tony Tyler (Chief Aerodynamicist, F310); Nicoló Petrucci (Chief Aerodynamicist, F310B); Paolo Martinelli (Engine Technical Director); Osamu Goto (Chief Engine Designer)
- Predecessor: 412 T2
- Successor: F300

Technical specifications
- Chassis: carbon-fibre and honeycomb composite structure
- Suspension (front): Independent Push Rod Activated
- Suspension (rear): Independent Push Rod Activated
- Length: 4355mm (171.5in)
- Width: 1995mm (78.5in)
- Height: 970mm (38.2in)
- Wheelbase: 2900mm (114.2in)
- Engine: 1996: Ferrari Tipo 046 75-degree V10. 1997: Ferrari Tipo 046/2 75-degree V10.
- Transmission: Ferrari Transverse sequential semi-automatic paddle-shift 1996: 6 Speed; 1997: 7 Speed
- Power: 715 hp @ 15,550 rpm.
- Fuel: Shell
- Tyres: Goodyear

Competition history
- Notable entrants: Scuderia Ferrari; Scuderia Ferrari Marlboro (1997)
- Notable drivers: 1./5. (Germany) Michael Schumacher; 2./6. (United Kingdom) Eddie Irvine
- Debut: 1996 Australian Grand Prix (F310); 1997 Australian Grand Prix (F310B)
- First win: 1996 Spanish Grand Prix (F310); 1997 Monaco Grand Prix (F310B)
- Last win: 1996 Italian Grand Prix (F310); 1997 Japanese Grand Prix (F310B)
Races	Wins	Podiums	Poles	F/Laps
33	8	22	7	5
- Constructors' Championships: 0
- Drivers' Championships: 0

The Ferrari F310, and its evolution, the F310B, were the Formula One racing cars with which the Ferrari team competed in the 1996 and 1997 seasons. It was driven in both years by Michael Schumacher, who was swapped with Benetton in favour of Jean Alesi, and Eddie Irvine, who replaced Gerhard Berger.

This was the first Ferrari Formula One car to run on Shell fuel since the 312B3 in 1973.

== F310 ==
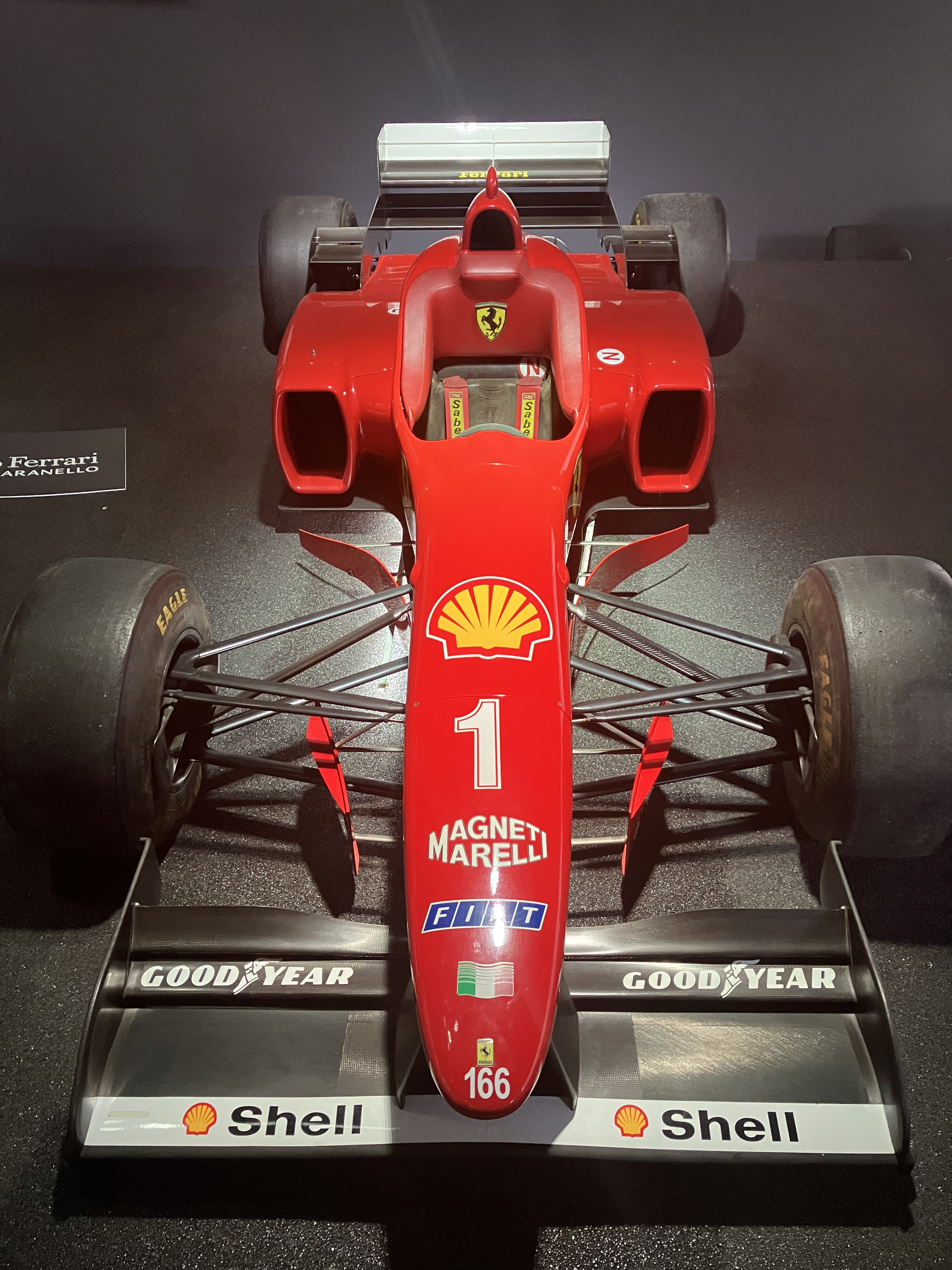
F310 at the Museo Ferrari

The F310 proved to be a front-running car, but without the outright pace or superb reliability which led to the Williams FW18s dominating 1996. Schumacher was able to win three Grands Prix, but the F310's shortcomings were shown by Irvine's run of eight consecutive retirements, most of them mechanical, as well as three straight double retirements. Schumacher was realistic about his aims for the season, saying that he hoped to win a few races before challenging for the title in 1997. Development also proved troublesome, with the cars having to use the 1995 car's parts early in the season whilst structural problems were cured.

This car was notable as being the first Ferrari F1 car to use the then more conventional V10 engine format, because a V10 engine offered the best compromise between power and fuel efficiency; the V12 was powerful but thirsty, and the V8 lacked the straightline speed of the V10. The name F310 refers to the engine type, a 3 litre, 10 cylinder (V10) - a nomenclature consistent with that used for Ferrari's F1 cars from 1966 to 1980 (the 312, 312B and 312T), and similar to that used for the 2006 Ferrari 248. The engine was also called the 310. It was engineered by former Honda technician Osamu Goto.

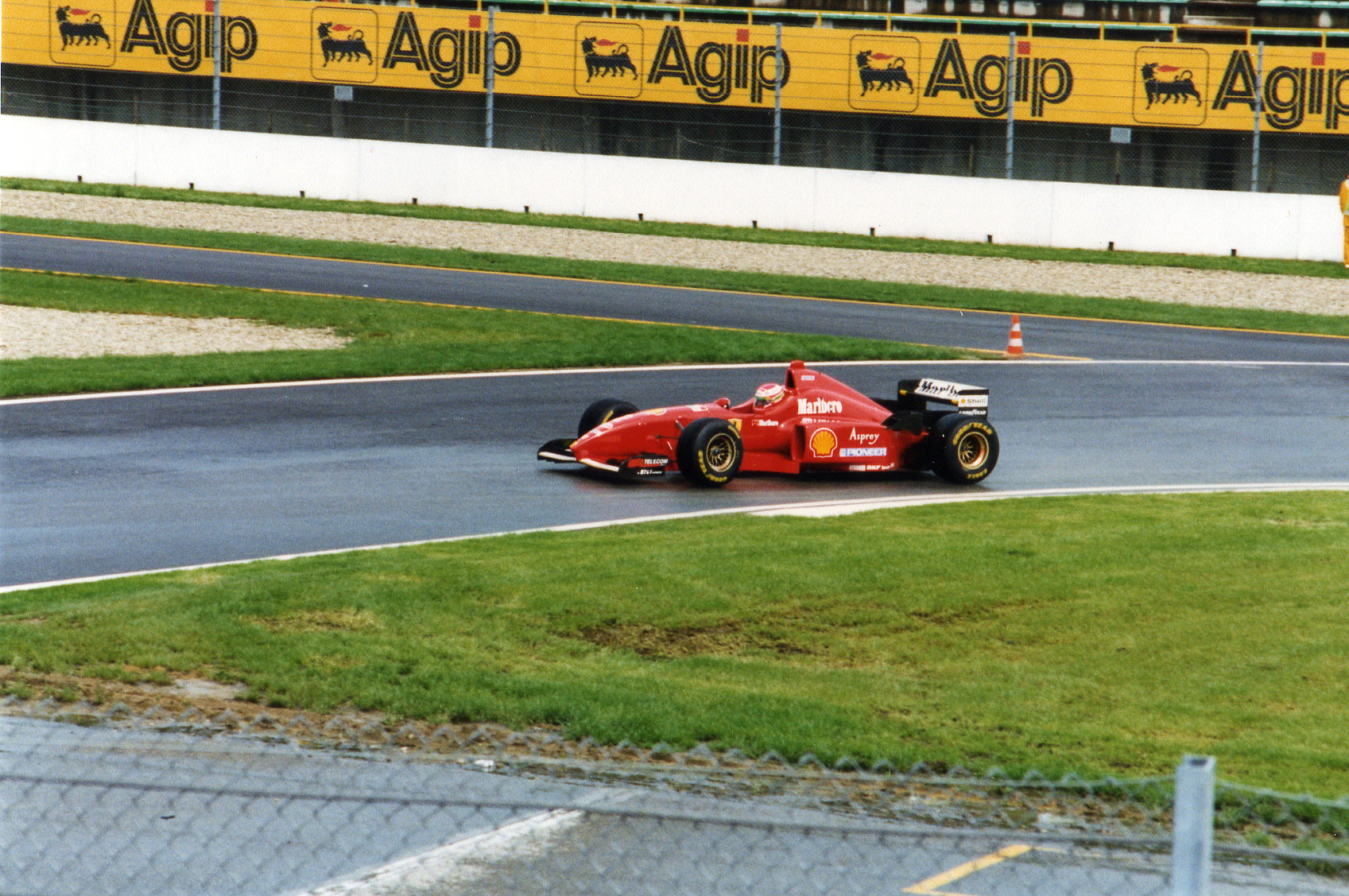

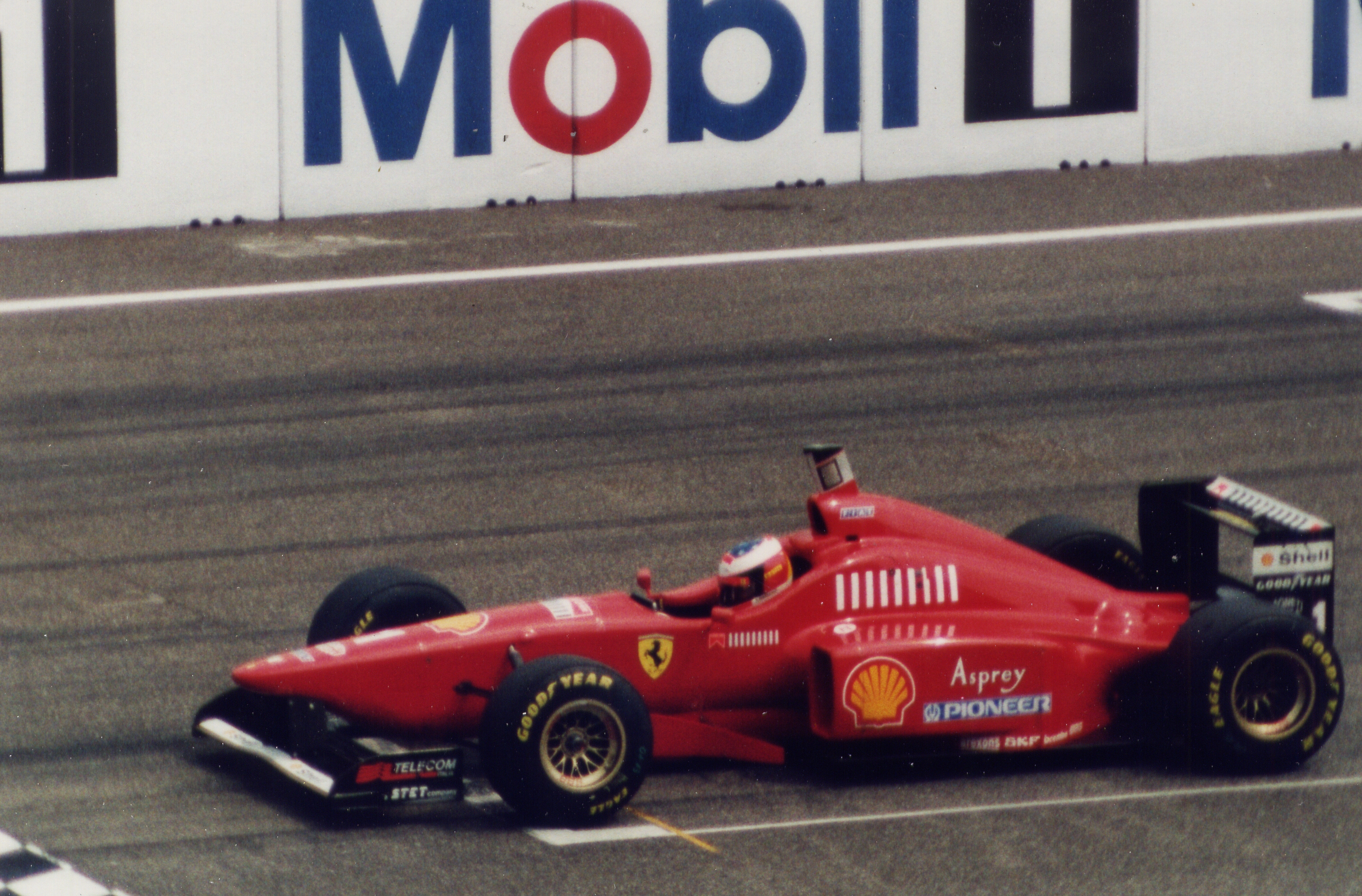
Ferrari was the last team to retain a low nose concept on their cars for the first half of the 1996 season (top), while eventually introducing a high nose after the Canadian Grand Prix (bottom)

Initially, the F310 was the only car in the 1996 field to have a low nose section, with the other teams having all switched to the more aerodynamically efficient high nose which was first seen on the 1990 Tyrrell 019. The high cockpit sides were meant to aid cooling and aerodynamics but in fact had the opposite effect. From the start, however, chief designer John Barnard had announced his intentions to design a high nose for the car, saying that the F310 would be an ongoing project with the ultimate goal to win the world championship. The high nose was eventually adopted permanently from the Canadian Grand Prix onwards. The F310 was the first F1 car to feature the dashboard gauges mounted to the steering wheel. In an interview in 2012, Irvine said he did not have fond memories of the F310, calling it "an awful car", a "piece of junk", and "almost undriveable", as did John Barnard, who admitted that the car "wasn't very good". Schumacher himself, reflecting many years later on the F310, referred to it as "a parachute".

== F310B ==
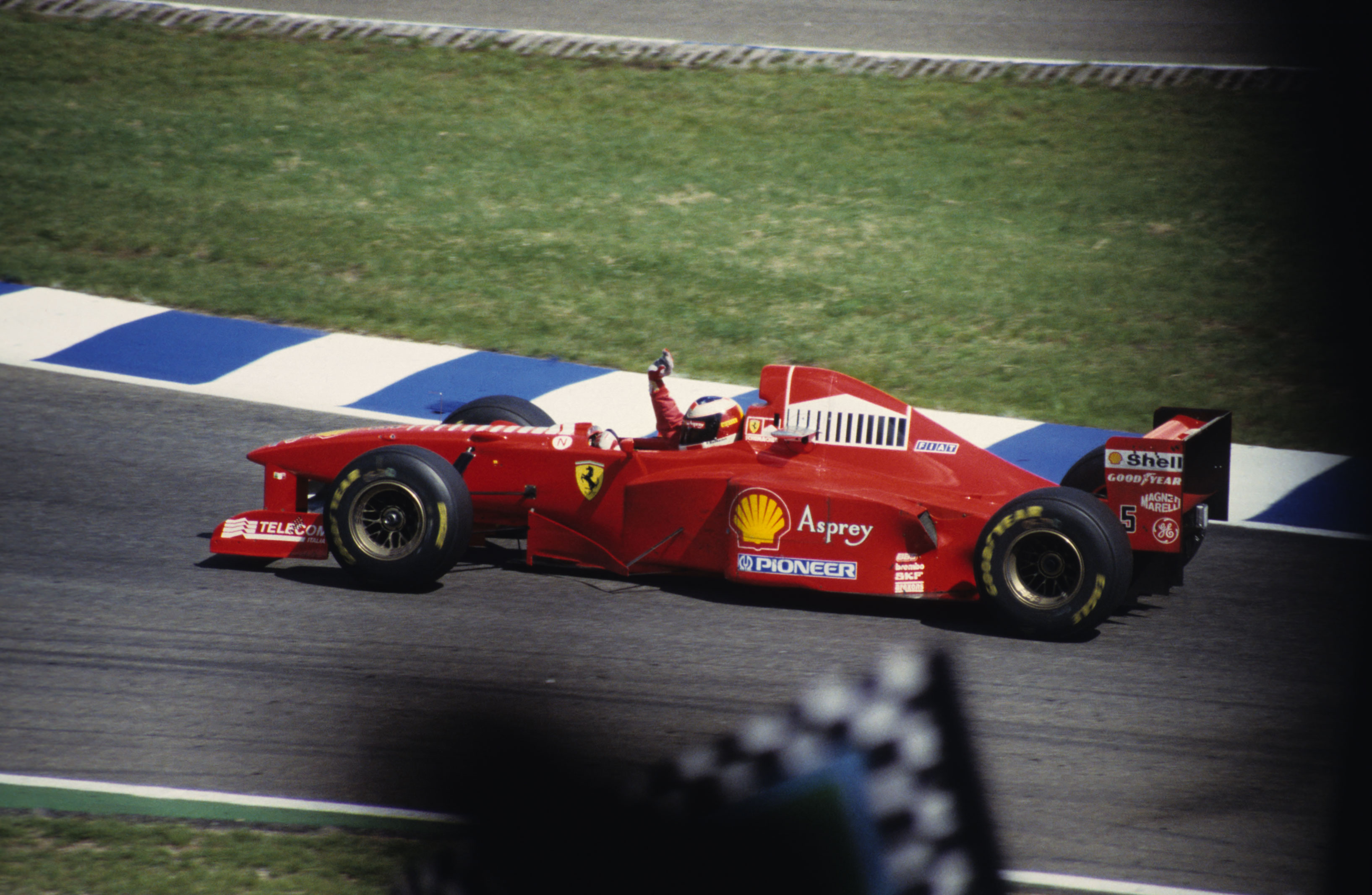
Michael Schumacher drove his F310B to second place at the 1997 German Grand Prix.

With the hiring of Rory Byrne and Ross Brawn to replace Barnard (who left mid-season in 1997 after Jean Todt decided the entire team including the design offices had to go back to Italy; and with Barnard not wanting to relocate to Italy because of personal reasons, Ferrari sold him the British-based Ferrari design offices, Ferrari Design and Development); part of the dream-team that would give Ferrari six straight Constructors' Championships from 1999 to 2004, they used the F310 as a base for the F310B, improving its shape and mechanicals, making it a five-time winning car in the process.

The F310B was better performing and much more reliable than its predecessor but suffered stability issues at the front of the car. A new front wing assembly introduced shortly after Brawn and Byrne joined the team improved the package.

Regardless, double-champion Michael Schumacher was true on his 1995 promise that "in 1996 we will win three grands prix, then in 1997 we will challenge for the championship" by taking the challenge to the last round. He was, however, unable to hold off a storming drive by title challenger Jacques Villeneuve; a botched attempt by Schumacher at defending his position ended up with him in the gravel, retired, and eventually disqualified from the 1997 season results. The team nonetheless retained their constructors' points.

In total, the F310 and F310B won eight Grands Prix, were on the podium 22 times, and achieved 7 pole positions and 172 points.

== Sponsorship and livery ==
Previously, Marlboro was the team's major sponsor; somewhere until 1997 when they became the team's title sponsor. Ferrari used 'Marlboro' logos, except at the French, British and German Grands Prix in both seasons.

== Other ==
The F310 appears in the video game F1 2013 as one of the classic cars and in Formula 1 97.

== Complete Formula One results ==
(key) (results in bold indicate pole position; results in italics indicate fastest lap)

Year	Chassis	Engine	Tyres	Drivers	1	2	3	4	5	6	7	8	9	10	11	12	13	14	15	16	17	Points	WCC
1996	F310	Ferrari Tipo 046; V10	G		AUS	BRA	ARG	EUR	SMR	MON	ESP	CAN	FRA	GBR	GER	HUN	BEL	ITA	POR	JPN		70	2nd
1996	F310	Ferrari Tipo 046; V10	G	Michael Schumacher	Ret	3	Ret	2	**2**	**Ret**	1	Ret	**DNS**	Ret	4	**9**	1	1	3	2		70	2nd
1996	F310	Ferrari Tipo 046; V10	G	Eddie Irvine	3	7	5	Ret	4	7	Ret	Ret	Ret	Ret	Ret	Ret	Ret	Ret	5	Ret		70	2nd
1997	F310B	Ferrari Tipo 046/2; V10	G		AUS	BRA	ARG	SMR	MON	ESP	CAN	FRA	GBR	GER	HUN	BEL	ITA	AUT	LUX	JPN	EUR	102	2nd
1997	F310B	Ferrari Tipo 046/2; V10	G	Michael Schumacher	2	5	Ret	2	1	4	**1**	**1**	Ret	2	**4**	1	6	6	Ret	1	Ret	102	2nd
1997	F310B	Ferrari Tipo 046/2; V10	G	Eddie Irvine	Ret	16	2	3	3	12	Ret	3	Ret	Ret	9	10	8	Ret	Ret	3	5	102	2nd
