= 1996 Japanese Grand Prix =

Race 16 of 16 in the 1996 Formula One World Championship
← Previous race	Next race →

Race details
- Date: 13 October 1996
- Official name: XXII Fuji Television Japanese Grand Prix
- Location: Suzuka Circuit; Suzuka, Mie Prefecture, Japan
- Course: Permanent racing facility
- Course length: 5.859 km (3.641 miles)
- Distance: 52 laps, 304.718 km (189.343 miles)
- Scheduled distance: 53 laps, 310.577 km (192.984 miles)
- Weather: Sunny, mild and dry
- Attendance: 303,000

Pole position
Driver	(Canada) Jacques Villeneuve	Williams-Renault
- Time: 1:38.909

Fastest lap
Driver	(Canada) Jacques Villeneuve	Williams-Renault
- Time: 1:44.043 on lap 34

Podium
First	(United Kingdom) Damon Hill	Williams-Renault
Second	(Germany) Michael Schumacher	Ferrari
Third	(Finland) Mika Häkkinen	McLaren-Mercedes

The 1996 Japanese Grand Prix (officially known as the XXII Fuji Television Japanese Grand Prix) was a Formula One motor race held at Suzuka on 13 October 1996. It was the sixteenth and final race of the 1996 Formula One World Championship.

The 52-lap race was won by Damon Hill, driving a Williams-Renault. Hill took his eighth win of the season, and with it the Drivers' Championship, after teammate and pole-sitter Jacques Villeneuve made a poor start and then retired when a wheel fell off. Villeneuve had needed to win the race, without Hill scoring, in order to win the Championship himself. Michael Schumacher finished second in a Ferrari, enabling the Italian team to steal second place in the Constructors' Championship from Benetton, with Mika Häkkinen third in a McLaren-Mercedes.

Hill was the first son of a World Champion to win the championship himself, his father Graham having been champion in 1962 and 1968. This was also the final race for Martin Brundle, who had been competing in F1 since 1984 and finished on the podium 9 times since 1992, as well as the last race for Pedro Lamy, Giovanni Lavaggi, Footwork and Ligier.

== Report ==
=== Background and qualifying ===
This was the first time since 1977 that Japan hosted the final round of the World Championship. This was the final race broadcast on television in the United Kingdom by the British Broadcasting Corporation until the 2009 F1 season. Starting from 1997 until 2008, ITV would broadcast on British television. As a result, this would be Jonathan Palmer's final race as commentator. This was also Steve Rider's final race as anchor until 2006. In qualifying, Villeneuve beat Hill to pole position by nearly half a second, with a further 0.7 seconds back to Schumacher in third.

=== Race ===
On race day, the first start was aborted when David Coulthard stalled his McLaren. At the second start, Villeneuve made a poor getaway and fell to sixth behind Hill, Gerhard Berger, Häkkinen, Schumacher and Eddie Irvine. Meanwhile, Jean Alesi, attempting to make up several places after qualifying ninth, spun off at the second corner and destroyed his Benetton; Alesi was unhurt from the impact. On the third lap, Berger attempted to overtake Hill at the final chicane, only to damage his front wing; after having to pit for a new nosecone, Berger dropped to eighteenth, and last, place, effectively ending his challenge for the lead.

Thereafter, Hill gradually pulled away, with Schumacher overtaking Häkkinen for second during the first round of pit stops. Pedro Diniz had lost control of his Ligier at the final chicane and spun off into the gravel trap by lap 14. Hill pitted for his second stop with a 25-second gap to Schumacher, emerging narrowly ahead of the Ferrari, before pulling away gradually once again to lead by 13 seconds with ten laps remaining.

Villeneuve, meanwhile, passed Irvine, set the fastest lap of the race and ran fourth before his right rear wheel came off on lap 37 due to a wheel bearing failure (this was the same incident that happened to team-mate Damon Hill during the British Grand Prix, according to BBC pit reporter Tony Jardine), putting him out of the race and handing the Drivers' Championship to Hill, already dropped by Williams for the following season. Whilst fighting for fourth place, Gerhard Berger (having fought back to fifth place following his earlier collision with Hill) had another collision with the Ferrari of Eddie Irvine at the final chicane causing the Northern Irishman to spin out and retire, but Berger was able to carry on unscathed. A late fightback saw Schumacher close the gap to Hill, but Hill held on to win the race by 1.8 seconds, with Häkkinen a further 1.4 seconds back, while Berger recovered to finish fourth, Martin Brundle came fifth in his final Grand Prix, and Heinz-Harald Frentzen picked up the final point for sixth.

In the UK, this was the last F1 race until 2009 to be broadcast live by the BBC. As Hill crossed the line to win the race and the championship, commentator Murray Walker said, "And I've got to stop, because I've got a lump in my throat."

== Classification ==
=== Qualifying ===
Pos	No	Driver	Constructor	Time	Gap
1	6	(Canada) Jacques Villeneuve	Williams-Renault	1:38.909	
2	5	(United Kingdom) Damon Hill	Williams-Renault	1:39.370	+0.461
3	1	(Germany) Michael Schumacher	Ferrari	1:40.071	+1.162
4	4	(Austria) Gerhard Berger	Benetton-Renault	1:40.364	+1.455
5	7	(Finland) Mika Häkkinen	McLaren-Mercedes	1:40.458	+1.549
6	2	(United Kingdom) Eddie Irvine	Ferrari	1:41.005	+2.096
7	15	(Germany) Heinz-Harald Frentzen	Sauber-Ford	1:41.277	+2.368
8	8	(United Kingdom) David Coulthard	McLaren-Mercedes	1:41.384	+2.475
9	3	(France) Jean Alesi	Benetton-Renault	1:41.562	+2.653
10	12	(United Kingdom) Martin Brundle	Jordan-Peugeot	1:41.600	+2.691
11	11	(Brazil) Rubens Barrichello	Jordan-Peugeot	1:41.919	+3.010
12	9	(France) Olivier Panis	Ligier-Mugen-Honda	1:42.206	+3.297
13	14	(United Kingdom) Johnny Herbert	Sauber-Ford	1:42.658	+3.749
14	18	(Japan) Ukyo Katayama	Tyrrell-Yamaha	1:42.711	+3.802
15	19	(Finland) Mika Salo	Tyrrell-Yamaha	1:42.840	+3.931
16	10	(Brazil) Pedro Diniz	Ligier-Mugen-Honda	1:43.196	+4.287
17	17	(Netherlands) Jos Verstappen	Footwork-Hart	1:43.383	+4.474
18	20	(Portugal) Pedro Lamy	Minardi-Ford	1:44.874	+5.965
19	16	(Brazil) Ricardo Rosset	Footwork-Hart	1:45.412	+6.503
107% time: 1:45.833
DNQ	21	(Italy) Giovanni Lavaggi	Minardi-Ford	1:46.795	+7.886

=== Race ===
Pos	No	Driver	Constructor	Laps	Time/Retired	Grid	Points
1	5	(United Kingdom) Damon Hill	Williams-Renault	52	1:32:33.791	2	10
2	1	(Germany) Michael Schumacher	Ferrari	52	+1.883	3	6
3	7	(Finland) Mika Häkkinen	McLaren-Mercedes	52	+3.212	5	4
4	4	(Austria) Gerhard Berger	Benetton-Renault	52	+26.526	4	3
5	12	(United Kingdom) Martin Brundle	Jordan-Peugeot	52	+1:07.120	10	2
6	15	(Germany) Heinz-Harald Frentzen	Sauber-Ford	52	+1:21.186	7	1
7	9	(France) Olivier Panis	Ligier-Mugen-Honda	52	+1:24.510	12	
8	8	(United Kingdom) David Coulthard	McLaren-Mercedes	52	+1:25.233	8	
9	11	(Brazil) Rubens Barrichello	Jordan-Peugeot	52	+1:41.065	11	
10	14	(United Kingdom) Johnny Herbert	Sauber-Ford	52	+1:41.799	13	
11	17	(Netherlands) Jos Verstappen	Footwork-Hart	51	+1 lap	17	
12	20	(Portugal) Pedro Lamy	Minardi-Ford	50	+2 laps	18	
13	16	(Brazil) Ricardo Rosset	Footwork-Hart	50	+2 laps	19	
Ret	2	(United Kingdom) Eddie Irvine	Ferrari	39	Collision/spun off	6	
Ret	18	(Japan) Ukyo Katayama	Tyrrell-Yamaha	37	Engine	14	
Ret	6	(Canada) Jacques Villeneuve	Williams-Renault	36	Wheel	1	
Ret	19	(Finland) Mika Salo	Tyrrell-Yamaha	20	Engine	15	
Ret	10	(Brazil) Pedro Diniz	Ligier-Mugen-Honda	13	Spun off	16	
Ret	3	(France) Jean Alesi	Benetton-Renault	0	Spun off	9	
DNQ	21	(Italy) Giovanni Lavaggi	Minardi-Ford		107% rule		

== Championship standings after the race ==
Drivers' Championship standings

Pos	Driver	Points
1	(United Kingdom) Damon Hill	97
2	(Canada) Jacques Villeneuve	78
3	(Germany) Michael Schumacher	59
4	(France) Jean Alesi	47
5	(Finland) Mika Häkkinen	31

Constructors' Championship standings

Pos	Constructor	Points
1	(United Kingdom) Williams-Renault	175
2	(Italy) Ferrari	70
3	(Italy) Benetton-Renault	68
4	(United Kingdom) McLaren-Mercedes	49
5	(Republic of Ireland) Jordan-Peugeot	22

- Note: Only the top five positions are included for both sets of standings.

Previous race: 1996 Portuguese Grand Prix	FIA Formula One World Championship; 1996 season	Next race: 1997 Australian Grand Prix
Previous race: 1995 Japanese Grand Prix	Japanese Grand Prix	Next race: 1997 Japanese Grand Prix
