= 1996 Formula One World Championship =

50th season of FIA Formula One motor racing

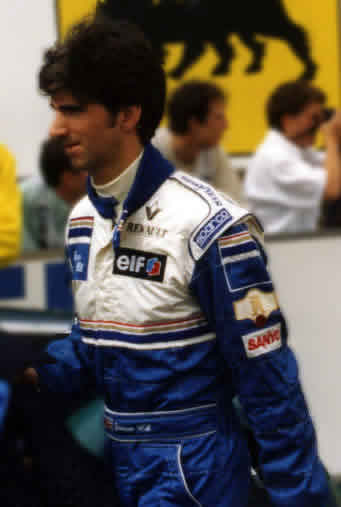
Damon Hill won his only Formula One World Championship in his last year with Williams. He became the first son of a Formula One Drivers' Champion to win the title.

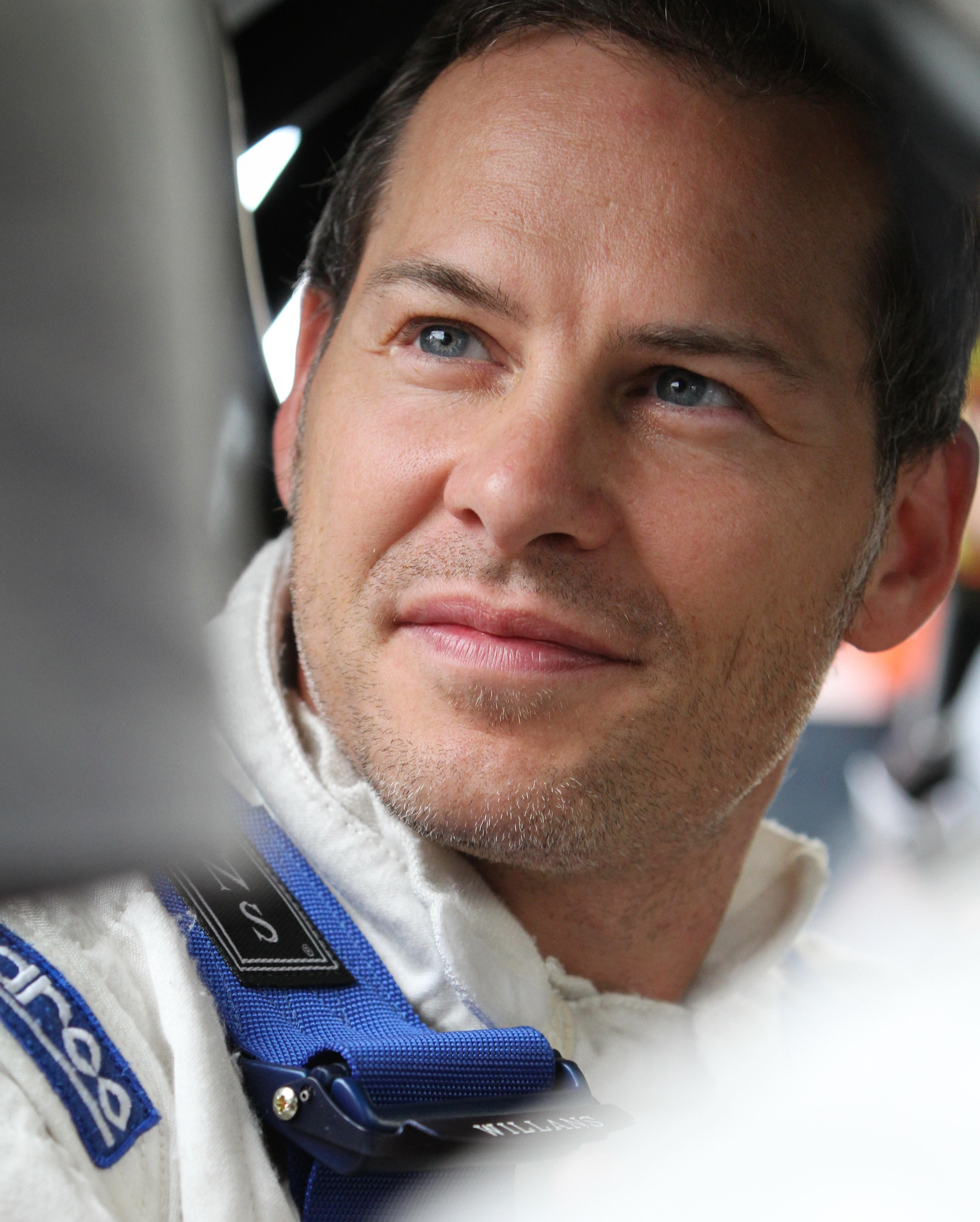
Hill's teammate Jacques Villeneuve (pictured in 2010) finished as runner-up in his debut season with four wins.

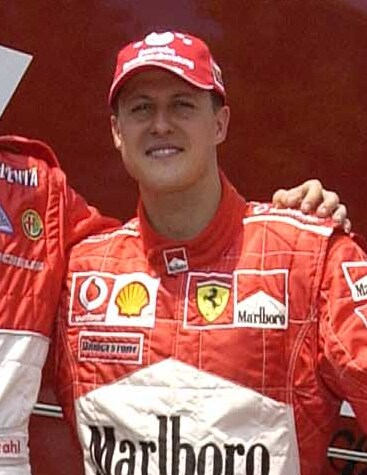
Then two-time and defending World Champion Michael Schumacher (pictured in 2003) finished third in his first year with Scuderia Ferrari, taking three wins for the team.

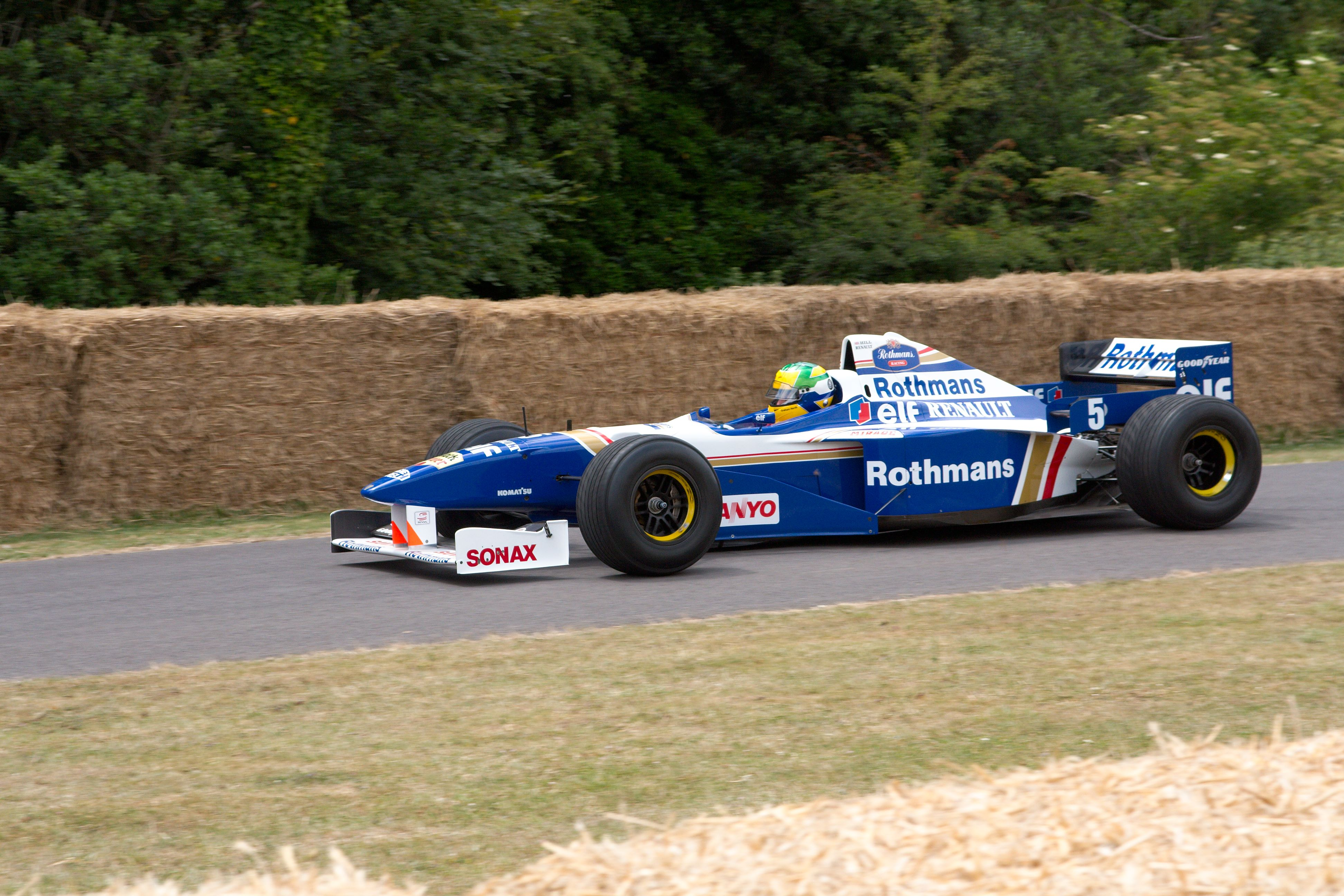
Williams-Renault won the World Constructors' Championship with the Williams FW18.

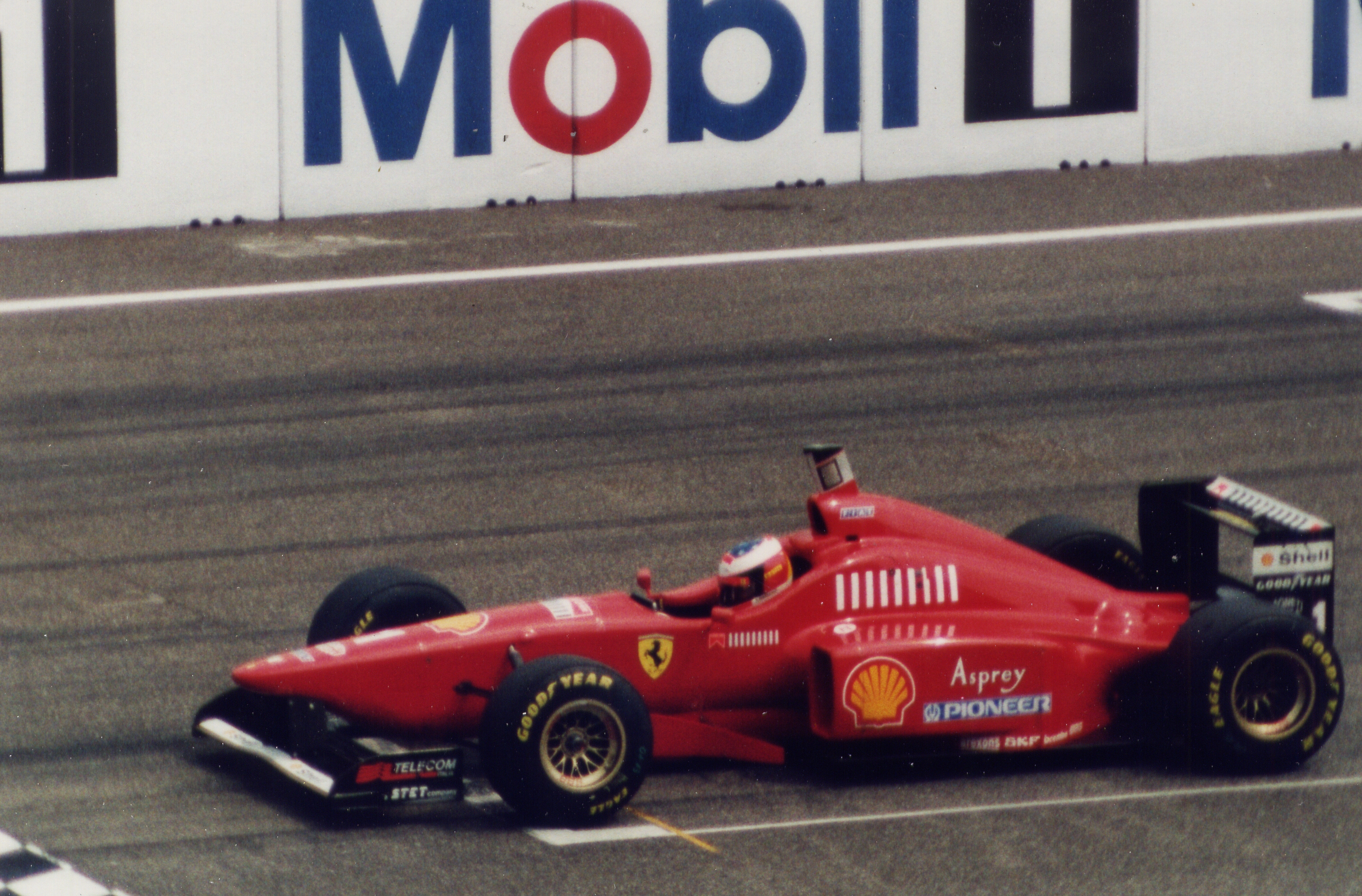
Scuderia Ferrari finished second in the World Constructors' Championship with the Ferrari F310.

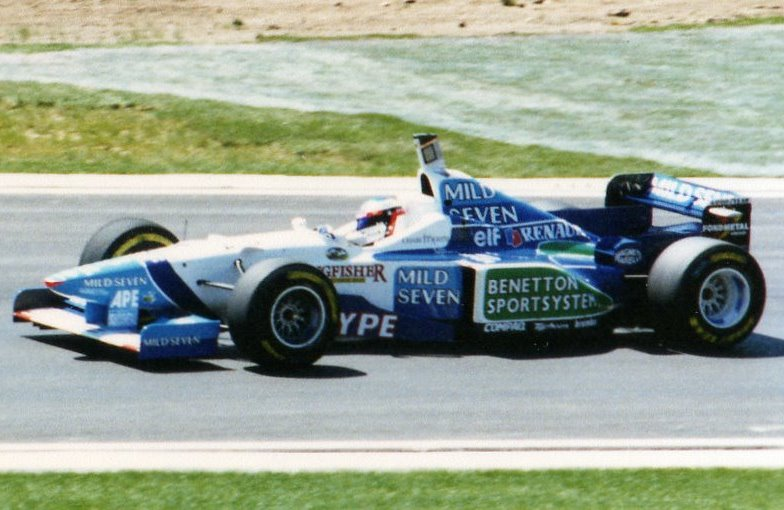
Benetton-Renault finished third in the World Constructors' Championship with the Benetton B196.

The 1996 FIA Formula One World Championship was the 50th season of FIA Formula One motor racing. The championship commenced on 10 March and ended on 13 October after sixteen races. Two World Championship titles were awarded, one for Drivers and one for Constructors.

Damon Hill won the Drivers' Championship two years after being beaten by a point by Michael Schumacher, making him the first son of a World Champion (his father Graham having won the title in 1962 and 1968) to have won the title himself as well as the only until Nico Rosberg, son of 1982 champion Keke Rosberg, won the title 34 years later in 2016. Hill, who had finished runner-up for the past two seasons, was seriously threatened only by his teammate, newcomer Jacques Villeneuve, the 1995 IndyCar and Indianapolis 500 champion. Williams-Renault easily won the Constructors' title, as there was no other competitor strong enough to post a consistent challenge throughout the championship. This was also the beginning of the end of Williams's 1990s dominance, as it was announced that Hill and designer Adrian Newey would depart at the conclusion of the season, with engine manufacturer Renault also leaving after 1997.

Two-time defending world champion Michael Schumacher had moved to Ferrari and despite numerous reliability problems, they had gradually developed into a front-running team by the end of the season. Defending Constructors' Champion Benetton began their decline towards the middle of the grid, having lost key personnel due to Schumacher's departure, and failed to win a race. Olivier Panis took the only victory of his career at the Monaco Grand Prix.

For the first time since 1979, no Brazilian driver mounted the podium, and this also was the last championship for a British driver until Lewis Hamilton in 2008. This year also saw the introduction of new car numbering system predominately based on the finishing order of the constructors' championship from the previous year (an exception being made in cases where a reigning drivers' champion moving teams) replacing the previous system which had been in since 1974. The constructors' championship-based car numbering system would remain in place until the end of the 2013 season. This was also the last season in which Goodyear would act as the sole tyre supplier in the sport as Bridgestone would join F1 for 1997 - creating a tyre war.

== Teams and drivers ==
The numbering system used since the 1974 season was dropped. Ferrari was given the numbers 1 and 2 after hiring the defending champion Michael Schumacher, despite finishing the previous year's Constructors' Championship in third, Benetton received numbers 3 and 4 for winning the Constructors' Championship, Williams got numbers 5 and 6 for finishing second, McLaren got 7 and 8 for finishing fourth, Ligier got 9 and 10 for finishing fifth, and so on, with the number 13 being skipped.

The following teams and drivers competed in the 1996 FIA Formula One World Championship. All teams competed with tyres supplied by Goodyear.

Entrant	Constructor	Chassis	Engine	No.	Driver	Rounds
(Italy) Scuderia Ferrari	Ferrari	F310	Ferrari Tipo 046 3.0 V10	1	(Germany) Michael Schumacher	All
(Italy) Scuderia Ferrari	Ferrari	F310	Ferrari Tipo 046 3.0 V10	2	(United Kingdom) Eddie Irvine	All
(Italy) Mild Seven Benetton Renault	Benetton-Renault	B196	Renault RS8 3.0 V10	3	(France) Jean Alesi	All
(Italy) Mild Seven Benetton Renault	Benetton-Renault	B196	Renault RS8 3.0 V10	4	(Austria) Gerhard Berger	All
(United Kingdom) Rothmans Williams Renault	Williams-Renault	FW18	Renault RS8 3.0 V10	5	(United Kingdom) Damon Hill	All
(United Kingdom) Rothmans Williams Renault	Williams-Renault	FW18	Renault RS8 3.0 V10	6	(Canada) Jacques Villeneuve	All
(United Kingdom) Marlboro McLaren Mercedes	McLaren-Mercedes	MP4/11; MP4/11B	Mercedes FO 110D 3.0 V10	7	(Finland) Mika Häkkinen	All
(United Kingdom) Marlboro McLaren Mercedes	McLaren-Mercedes	MP4/11; MP4/11B	Mercedes FO 110D 3.0 V10	8	(United Kingdom) David Coulthard	All
(France) Ligier Gauloises Blondes	Ligier-Mugen-Honda	JS43	Mugen-Honda MF-301HA 3.0 V10	9	(France) Olivier Panis	All
(France) Ligier Gauloises Blondes	Ligier-Mugen-Honda	JS43	Mugen-Honda MF-301HA 3.0 V10	10	(Brazil) Pedro Diniz	All
(Republic of Ireland) Benson & Hedges Total Jordan Peugeot	Jordan-Peugeot	196	Peugeot A12 3.0 V10	11	(Brazil) Rubens Barrichello	All
(Republic of Ireland) Benson & Hedges Total Jordan Peugeot	Jordan-Peugeot	196	Peugeot A12 3.0 V10	12	(United Kingdom) Martin Brundle	All
(Switzerland) Red Bull Sauber Ford	Sauber-Ford	C15	Ford JD Zetec-R 3.0 V10	14	(United Kingdom) Johnny Herbert	All
(Switzerland) Red Bull Sauber Ford	Sauber-Ford	C15	Ford JD Zetec-R 3.0 V10	15	(Germany) Heinz-Harald Frentzen	All
(United Kingdom) Footwork Hart	Footwork-Hart	FA17	Hart 830 3.0 V8	16	(Brazil) Ricardo Rosset	All
(United Kingdom) Footwork Hart	Footwork-Hart	FA17	Hart 830 3.0 V8	17	(Netherlands) Jos Verstappen	All
(United Kingdom) Tyrrell Yamaha	Tyrrell-Yamaha	024	Yamaha OX11A 3.0 V10	18	(Japan) Ukyo Katayama	All
(United Kingdom) Tyrrell Yamaha	Tyrrell-Yamaha	024	Yamaha OX11A 3.0 V10	19	(Finland) Mika Salo	All
(Italy) Minardi Team	Minardi-Ford	M195B	Ford-Cosworth EDM2 3.0 V8; Ford-Cosworth EDM3 3.0 V8	20	(Portugal) Pedro Lamy	All
(Italy) Minardi Team	Minardi-Ford	M195B	Ford-Cosworth EDM2 3.0 V8; Ford-Cosworth EDM3 3.0 V8	21	(Italy) Giancarlo Fisichella	1, 4–10
(Italy) Minardi Team	Minardi-Ford	M195B	Ford-Cosworth EDM2 3.0 V8; Ford-Cosworth EDM3 3.0 V8	21	(Brazil) Tarso Marques	2–3
(Italy) Minardi Team	Minardi-Ford	M195B	Ford-Cosworth EDM2 3.0 V8; Ford-Cosworth EDM3 3.0 V8	21	(Italy) Giovanni Lavaggi	11–16
(Italy) Forti Grand Prix (Note: Forti Grand Prix were declared bankrupt after the British Grand Prix and took no further part in the championship.)	Forti-Ford	FG01B; FG03	Ford ECA Zetec-R 3.0 V8	22	(Italy) Luca Badoer	1–10
(Italy) Forti Grand Prix	Forti-Ford	FG01B; FG03	Ford ECA Zetec-R 3.0 V8	23	(Italy) Andrea Montermini	1–10

=== Team changes ===
- By receiving an Italian licence the defending Constructors' Champion Benetton officially became an Italian constructor, though it continued to operate from the same base in Britain.
- Jordan gained a new title sponsor in British cigarette brand Benson & Hedges, who joined oil supplier Total and engine company Peugeot in the team's official name.
- Meanwhile, Tyrrell lost their title sponsor, Finnish communications company Nokia, becoming officially known simply as Tyrrell Yamaha.
- Forti also lost the sponsorship of Italian dairy corporation Parmalat, as well as any official connection to Ford, although they continued to use Ford engines.
- Scuderia Italia decided to end their two-year working relationship with Minardi, so the team once again became known simply as Minardi Team.
- Two teams disappeared from the entry list entirely. Larrousse had missed the early races of 1995 before finally announcing their withdrawal before the San Marino Grand Prix. Gérard Larrousse claimed several times the team would reappear in 1996, but a combination of legal and financial difficulties meant this never materialised. Pacific withdrew from the sport at the end of 1995.
- Scuderia Ferrari decided to change from the V12 engine they competed with the previous season to the V-10 engine configuration which was used by most of the other teams. For the first time since 1988, no Formula One entrants utilized a V12 engine in their car.

=== Driver changes ===
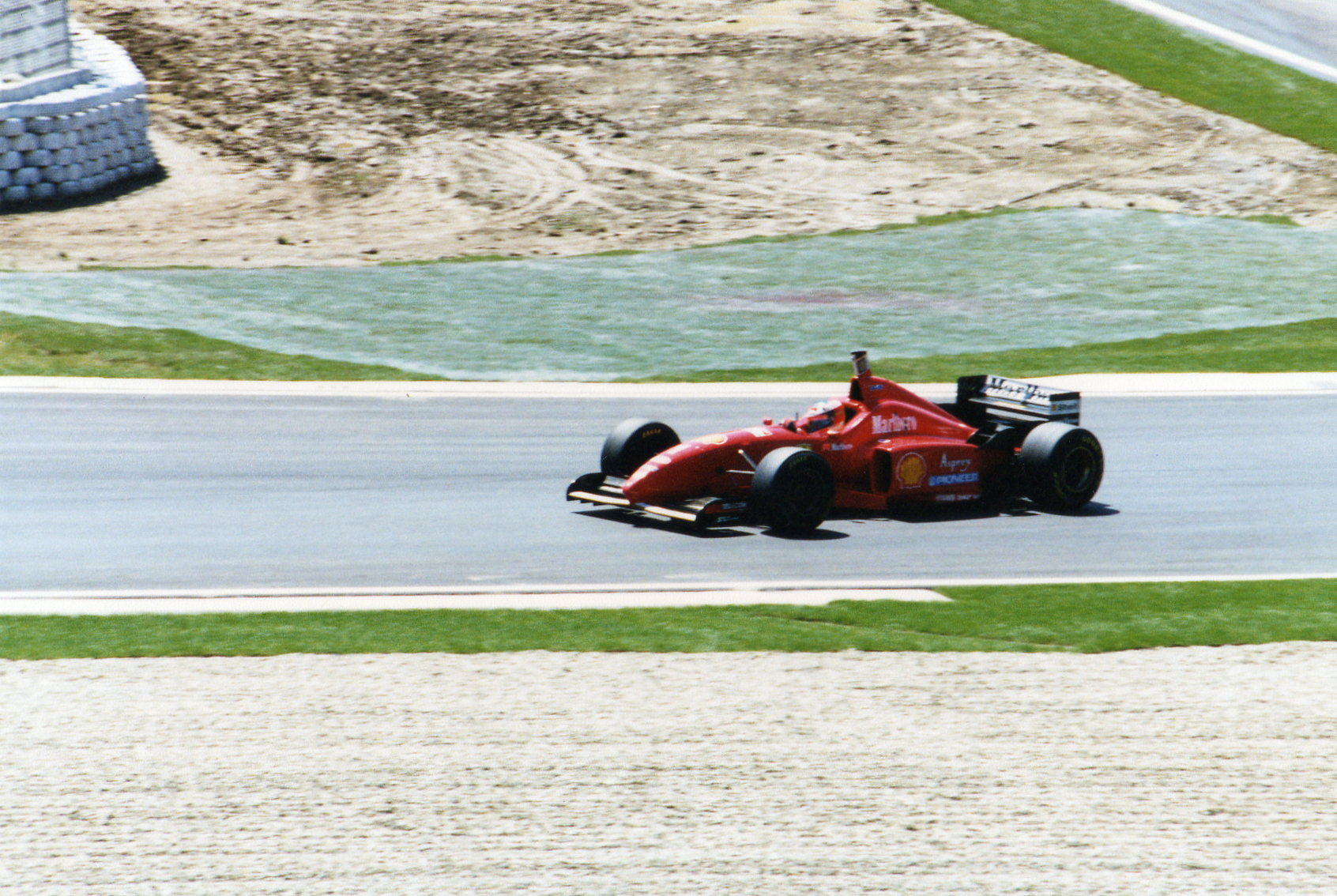
Michael Schumacher moved to Ferrari over the winter break.

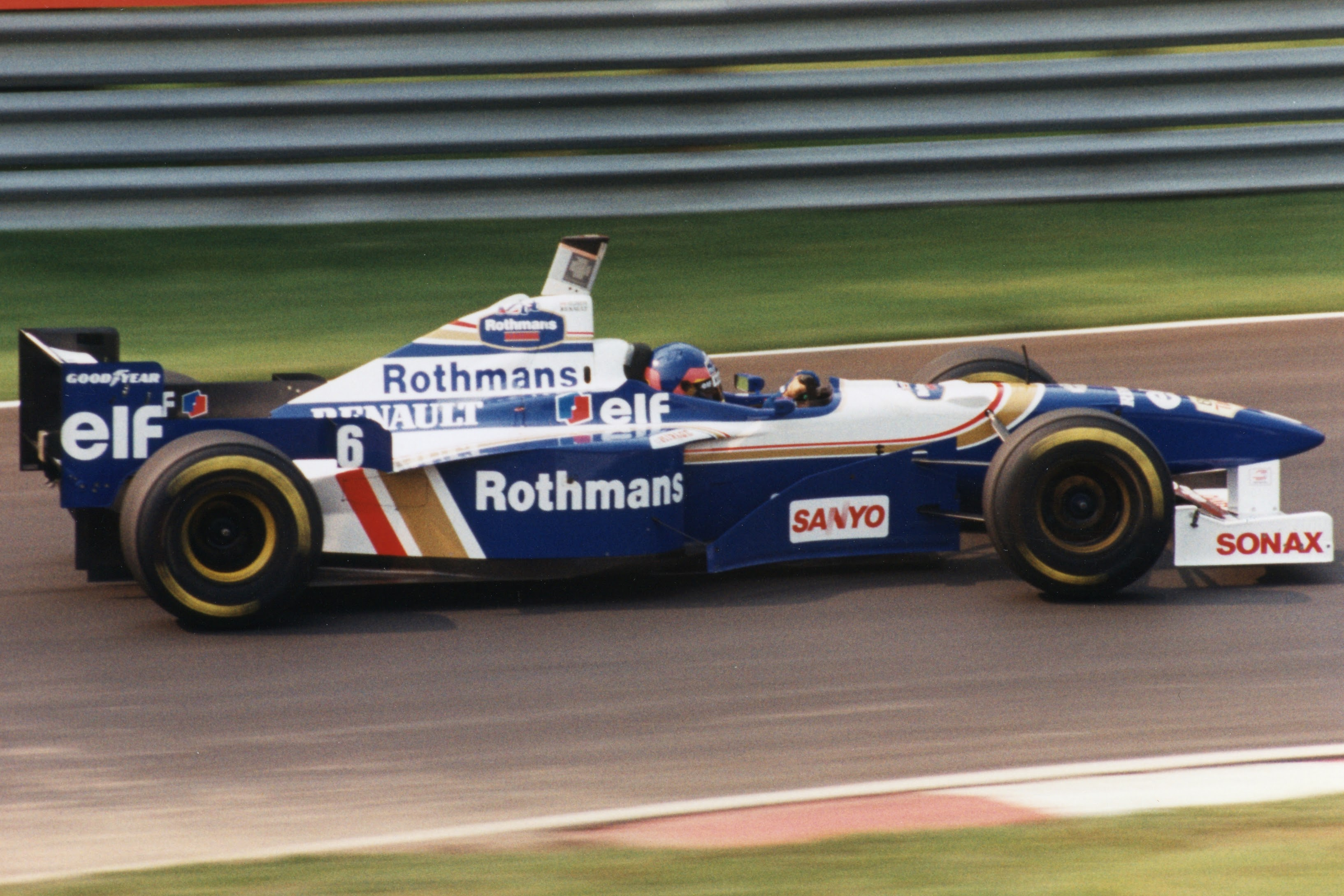
Jacques Villeneuve replaced David Coulthard at Williams

- Defending double world champion Michael Schumacher left Benetton to join Ferrari, citing the need for a new challenge. He displaced Jean Alesi, who moved in the opposite direction. Gerhard Berger was offered the chance to stay as Schumacher's teammate, but eventually opted to join Alesi at Benetton. Ferrari filled the seat with Jordan's Eddie Irvine.
- Berger's decision to join Benetton ousted Johnny Herbert, who joined Sauber alongside Heinz-Harald Frentzen. Sauber's other seat had been filled in 1995 by both Karl Wendlinger, who left F1 still struggling to recover fully from injuries sustained at the 1994 Monaco Grand Prix, and Jean-Christophe Boullion, who returned to his testing role at Williams.
- Williams dropped David Coulthard, instead recruiting Canadian rookie Jacques Villeneuve, who had won the 1995 CART Championship and the 1995 Indianapolis 500, to partner Damon Hill. Coulthard joined McLaren alongside Mika Häkkinen, replacing Mark Blundell, who moved into CART with PacWest Racing.
- Martin Brundle left Ligier in order to replace the Ferrari-bound Irvine at Jordan, where he would partner Rubens Barrichello. Ligier replaced him by bringing in Forti's Pedro Diniz alongside Olivier Panis. Aguri Suzuki, who had shared Brundle's seat in 1995, left F1 altogether.
- Footwork had an entirely new line-up in 1996, dispensing with all three of their 1995 drivers. Gianni Morbidelli became a test driver for Jordan, before returning to a race seat in 1997 with Sauber, while fellow Italian Max Papis moved to America to race in the CART Series. Taki Inoue was rumoured to have secured a drive with both Tyrrell and Minardi, but ultimately lost out on both seats and moved to sports cars. Footwork replaced them with Jos Verstappen from the now-defunct Simtek team, and 1995 International Formula 3000 runner-up Ricardo Rosset. Simtek's other driver, Domenico Schiattarella left F1 completely.
- Luca Badoer moved from Minardi to Forti, replacing Pedro Diniz, who had gone to Ligier. As his replacement, Minardi brought in Giancarlo Fisichella, who had been racing with Alfa Romeo in the International Touring Car Championship, to partner Pedro Lamy. Badoer's teammate at Forti would be Andrea Montermini, who had raced for the now-extinct Pacific team in 1995. He replaced Roberto Moreno, who moved into Champ Car.
- Tyrrell was the only team on the grid to have an unchanged driver line-up from 1995 with Ukyo Katayama and Mika Salo.

==== Mid-season changes ====
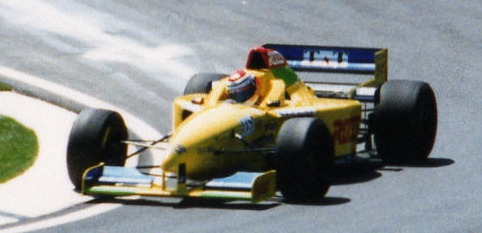
Andrea Montermini was left without a drive when the Forti team folded halfway through the season.

- Due to his commitments with Alfa Romeo in the International Touring Car Championship, Giancarlo Fisichella missed several races for Minardi. European Formula 3000 driver Tarso Marques raced at the Brazilian and Argentine Grands Prix, while Giovanni Lavaggi, who had raced for Pacific in 1995, replaced the pair of them from the German Grand Prix onwards due to his superior financial backing.
- Forti were declared bankrupt after the British Grand Prix, leaving both their drivers out of a drive. Luca Badoer would eventually return to F1 in 1999 with Minardi, after a spell in the FIA GT Championship, while Andrea Montermini became a test driver for the short-lived Lola team in 1997.

== Calendar ==
The 1996 FIA Formula One World Championship comprised the following races:

Round	Grand Prix	Circuit	Date
1	Australian Grand Prix	(Australia) Albert Park Circuit, Melbourne	10 March
2	Brazilian Grand Prix	(Brazil) Autódromo José Carlos Pace, São Paulo	31 March
3	Argentine Grand Prix	(Argentina) Autódromo Oscar Alfredo Gálvez, Buenos Aires	7 April
4	European Grand Prix	(Germany) Nürburgring, Nürburg	28 April
5	San Marino Grand Prix	(Italy) Autodromo Enzo e Dino Ferrari, Imola	5 May
6	Monaco Grand Prix	Circuit de Monaco, Monte Carlo	19 May
7	Spanish Grand Prix	(Spain) Circuit de Catalunya, Montmeló	2 June
8	Canadian Grand Prix	(Canada) Circuit Gilles Villeneuve, Montreal	16 June
9	French Grand Prix	(France) Circuit de Nevers Magny-Cours, Magny-Cours	30 June
10	British Grand Prix	(United Kingdom) Silverstone Circuit, Silverstone	14 July
11	German Grand Prix	(Germany) Hockenheimring, Hockenheim	28 July
12	Hungarian Grand Prix	(Hungary) Hungaroring, Mogyoród	11 August
13	Belgian Grand Prix	(Belgium) Circuit de Spa-Francorchamps, Stavelot	25 August
14	Italian Grand Prix	(Italy) Autodromo Nazionale di Monza, Monza	8 September
15	Portuguese Grand Prix	(Portugal) Autodromo do Estoril, Estoril	22 September
16	Japanese Grand Prix	(Japan) Suzuka Circuit, Suzuka	13 October

=== Calendar changes ===
- The Australian Grand Prix was moved from the Adelaide Street Circuit to the Albert Park Circuit in Port Phillip near Melbourne. The change of venue also resulted in the grand prix becoming the season opener instead of its finale.
- The Indonesian Grand Prix (renamed from the Pacific Grand Prix) was due to be held in Indonesia at the Sentul International Circuit as the final round but the race did not make the calendar as the corners were unsuitable for Formula One cars.
- The European Grand Prix at Nürburgring was moved to an earlier April date for 1996 having been held in October near the end of the season in 1995.

== Regulation changes ==
=== Technical regulations ===
- In 1995, the sides of the cockpit were raised in order to provide better head protection for the driver. These sides were raised even higher (to mid-helmet height) for 1996, along with a wraparound head restraint made of foam to prevent head injuries such as those suffered by Mika Häkkinen during qualifying for the 1995 Australian Grand Prix. Also, the cockpit opening was made larger, with the front tip now extending to 625 mm (24.6 in) from the front wheel centre line instead of 750 mm (30 in).
- Needle-like nosecone designs with a sharp point, such as the McLaren MP4/10, Forti FG01 and Tyrrell 023, were also banned in favour of more blunt nose sections.
- The minimum weight (with driver) was raised from 595 kg (1,312 lb) to 600 kg (1,323 lb).
- To prevent damage to other cars' tyres, front wing endplates had to be at least 10 mm (0.39 in) thick.

=== Sporting and event regulations ===
- The race weekend schedule was changed for the 1996 season compared to 1995. The number of free practice sessions was increased from the two to three with the number of laps allocated for each day increased from 23 to 30. Also, to increase the spectacle, the Friday qualifying session was dropped, with the FIA World Motor Sport Council opting to have only one qualifying session, held on Saturday afternoon and limited to 12 laps for drivers.
- This year saw the introduction of the "107% rule", which meant all cars had to be within 107% of the pole position time in order to qualify for the race.
- The previous system of having a red and green light to start the race was replaced by the current system of five red lights turning on sequentially with a period of usually five seconds, then all going out simultaneously before starting the race.
- A new numbering system for cars was adopted for 1996 and remained in place until the end of 2013, when a new system was introduced. Previously, the reigning Drivers' Champion's team had simply swapped car numbers with the previous Drivers' Champion's team to carry numbers 1 and 2, with all other teams retaining their existing numbers. For 1996 the reigning Drivers' Champion was given number 1 and his teammate number 2 with the rest of the teams numbered in the order of their finishing position in the previous year's Constructors' Championship. Any new teams were allocated the following numbers in order of entry to the championship.
- Continued safety improvements and modifications on circuits brought the number of "high risk" corners on the calendar down to two.
- Mercedes-Benz began supplying safety and medical cars for Grand Prix racing during this season. Prior to this, each track had had its own safety car, some of which had proven unsuitable for F1 races (such as at the 1994 San Marino Grand Prix).

== Season report ==
Damon Hill won the season opener in Australia from his Williams teammate Jacques Villeneuve, with Ferrari's Eddie Irvine finishing third. Villeneuve was leading but late on in the race the team found out that Villeneuve had an oil leak and ordered him to swap places with teammate Hill.

The Brazilian Grand Prix took place in heavy rain, and was won from pole position by Damon Hill, with Jean Alesi second in a Benetton and Michael Schumacher third in a Ferrari.

Despite suffering a bout of food poisoning, Damon Hill made it three wins out of three at the Argentine Grand Prix, with Jacques Villeneuve helping Williams to their second one-two of the season. Jos Verstappen scored his only point of the season, while Andrea Montermini registered his only finish of the season. Pedro Diniz was involved in two major incidents during the race. First he collided with Luca Badoer, whose Forti was flipped and landed upside down in the gravel, forcing the marshals to bring out the safety car. Diniz managed to continue and made a pit stop as the safety car was preparing to pull in, only to retire when he came back onto the circuit and his Ligier burst into flames because a safety-valve in the fuel tank had jammed open.

The European Grand Prix at the Nürburgring (Note: All Formula One Grands Prix held at the Nürburgring since 1984 have used the 5 km (3.1 mi) long GP-Strecke and not the 21 km (13 mi) long Nordschleife, which was last used by Formula One in 1976.) in Germany was won by Jacques Villeneuve for his first F1 victory in only his fourth race. Michael Schumacher finished second, with David Coulthard third in a McLaren, just ahead of Hill.

The San Marino Grand Prix was won by Damon Hill after starting from second position. Michael Schumacher again finished second, despite his front-right brake seizing halfway around the final lap, while Gerhard Berger was third, driving for the Benetton team. Jacques Villeneuve retired near the end of the race after being hit by Jean Alesi.

Round six at Monaco was run in wet weather, causing significant attrition and setting a record for the fewest cars (three) to be running at the end of a Grand Prix. Olivier Panis scored what would be his sole career Formula One victory, earning the last Formula One victory for the Ligier team, and the first ever for engine manufacturer Mugen Motorsports, after he made the switch onto slick tyres in a well-timed pitstop. It also marked the only win by a team outside the "Big Four" teams (McLaren, Williams, Benetton, and Ferrari) between the 1988 season and the 1997 season as well as the last Grand Prix win by a car built in France. David Coulthard was second, nearly five seconds behind Panis. Johnny Herbert scored his only points of the season, finishing third in a Sauber, more than half a minute behind Coulthard.

The Spanish Grand Prix saw Michael Schumacher's first Ferrari victory, and is generally regarded as one of the German's finest races. In torrential rain, he produced a stunning drive, helping him to earn the nickname "the Rainmaster". Schumacher recovered from a poor start to take the lead from Villeneuve on lap 13, and from then on he dominated the race, frequently lapping over three seconds faster than the remainder of the field. Jean Alesi finished second, more than 45 seconds behind the winner, with Jacques Villeneuve third. Rubens Barrichello, who was running in second place after Jacques Villeneuve and Alesi made their pit stops, put in a strong performance in this race, but was forced to retire due to a clutch problem with 20 laps remaining. After an uneventful race on his part, Heinz-Harald Frentzen finished in fourth, while Mika Häkkinen took fifth after surviving a spin off the track in the closing stages of the race. Jos Verstappen, running fifth after the retirements of Barrichello and Berger, crashed into the tyre barrier with 12 laps left, guaranteeing Diniz his first Formula One point as by this time only six drivers were left in the race. Damon Hill had started the race from pole position, but dropped to 8th after spinning twice in the opening laps, before another spin into the pit wall on lap 12 ended his race.

The Canadian Grand Prix was won from pole position by Damon Hill, with home driver Jacques Villeneuve second, and Frenchman Jean Alesi third.

The second half of the season began with the French Grand Prix at Magny-Cours. Michael Schumacher qualified in pole position but his engine blew on the warm-up lap and he did not start. The race was won by Damon Hill, with Jacques Villeneuve finishing second in the other Williams, and Jean Alesi again third for the Benetton team. This was the last Grand Prix where a Forti car started the race (two weeks later the team would fail to qualify for the British Grand Prix, the final Formula One event they would enter), however both cars were forced to retire.

Jacques Villeneuve took his second win of the season at the British Grand Prix, with Benetton's Gerhard Berger second and McLaren's Mika Häkkinen coming home third for his first podium since his near-fatal crash at the 1995 Australian Grand Prix. Jordan's Rubens Barrichello took fourth, equalling his best finish of the season. The final points went to David Coulthard in the second McLaren and Martin Brundle in the second Jordan. Hill took pole position for his home race, but made a slow start and retired shortly before half distance, after a wheel nut problem caused him to spin off at Copse Corner while he was trying to pass Häkkinen. For the third consecutive race, Ferrari drivers Michael Schumacher and Eddie Irvine were both forced to retire with technical issues.

The German Grand Prix at Hockenheim was won by Damon Hill, taking his seventh victory of the season after he started from pole position. Austrian driver Gerhard Berger started alongside Hill on the front row in his Benetton and led for much of the race, until his engine failed with three laps remaining. Berger's teammate Jean Alesi was second and Jacques Villeneuve was third. The win meant Hill extended his lead over Villeneuve in the Drivers' Championship to 21 points with five races remaining.

The Hungarian Grand Prix was won by Jacques Villeneuve after starting from third position. Villeneuve's teammate Damon Hill finished second, with Jean Alesi third. This was Williams's fifth 1–2 finish of the season, and it secured their fourth Constructors' Championship in five years.

The Belgian Grand Prix saw Michael Schumacher take victory, driving a Ferrari. Schumacher had crashed heavily in Friday practice, but recovered to qualify third before taking his second win of the season. Jacques Villeneuve, who had started from pole position, finished second in his Williams, with Mika Häkkinen third in a McLaren. Drivers' Championship leader, Damon Hill, finished fifth.

The Italian Grand Prix was won by Michael Schumacher, giving Ferrari their first victory at Monza since 1988. Jean Alesi finished second in a Benetton, with Mika Häkkinen third. Damon Hill took pole position and led until he made an error and spun off on lap 6, while his teammate and main championship rival, Jacques Villeneuve, could only manage seventh.

The penultimate race of the season was the Portuguese Grand Prix. Williams's Jacques Villeneuve won from teammate Damon Hill in second and Ferrari's Michael Schumacher in third. This victory, Villeneuve's fourth of the season, ensured that the Drivers' Championship battle between him and Hill would go to the final round. Benetton's Jean Alesi finished fourth, just behind Schumacher, while Eddie Irvine in the second Ferrari and Gerhard Berger in the second Benetton survived a last-lap collision to take fifth and sixth respectively.

The 1996 season concluded with the title-deciding Japanese Grand Prix on 13 October. Before the event, Hill was leading the Drivers' Championship standings, with teammate Villeneuve needing to win the race without Hill scoring in order to win the championship himself. In qualifying, Villeneuve took pole position, but made a poor start to the race and later retired when a wheel fell off his car. The race was won by Damon Hill for his eighth victory of the season, securing the Drivers' Championship in the process. Michael Schumacher finished second in a Ferrari, enabling the Italian team to steal second place in the Constructors' Championship from Benetton, with Mika Häkkinen finishing third in a McLaren. Hill became the first son of a World Champion to win the championship himself, his father Graham having twice been champion, in 1962 and 1968.

== Results and standings ==
=== Grands Prix ===
Round	Grand Prix	Pole position	Fastest lap	Winning driver	Winning constructor	Report
1	(Australia) Australian Grand Prix	(Canada) Jacques Villeneuve	(Canada) Jacques Villeneuve	(United Kingdom) Damon Hill	(United Kingdom) Williams-Renault	Report
2	(Brazil) Brazilian Grand Prix	(United Kingdom) Damon Hill	(United Kingdom) Damon Hill	(United Kingdom) Damon Hill	(United Kingdom) Williams-Renault	Report
3	(Argentina) Argentine Grand Prix	(United Kingdom) Damon Hill	(France) Jean Alesi	(United Kingdom) Damon Hill	(United Kingdom) Williams-Renault	Report
4	(Germany) European Grand Prix	(United Kingdom) Damon Hill	(United Kingdom) Damon Hill	(Canada) Jacques Villeneuve	(United Kingdom) Williams-Renault	Report
5	(Italy) San Marino Grand Prix	(Germany) Michael Schumacher	(United Kingdom) Damon Hill	(United Kingdom) Damon Hill	(United Kingdom) Williams-Renault	Report
6	Monaco Grand Prix	(Germany) Michael Schumacher	(France) Jean Alesi	(France) Olivier Panis	(France) Ligier-Mugen-Honda	Report
7	(Spain) Spanish Grand Prix	(United Kingdom) Damon Hill	(Germany) Michael Schumacher	(Germany) Michael Schumacher	(Italy) Ferrari	Report
8	(Canada) Canadian Grand Prix	(United Kingdom) Damon Hill	(Canada) Jacques Villeneuve	(United Kingdom) Damon Hill	(United Kingdom) Williams-Renault	Report
9	(France) French Grand Prix	(Germany) Michael Schumacher (Note: Michael Schumacher set the fastest time in qualifying, but did not start the race due to an engine failure on the formation lap. Pole position was left vacant on the grid. Damon Hill, in the second slot, was the first driver on the grid. Schumacher is still considered to have held pole position.)	(Canada) Jacques Villeneuve	(United Kingdom) Damon Hill	(United Kingdom) Williams-Renault	Report
10	(United Kingdom) British Grand Prix	(United Kingdom) Damon Hill	(Canada) Jacques Villeneuve	(Canada) Jacques Villeneuve	(United Kingdom) Williams-Renault	Report
11	(Germany) German Grand Prix	(United Kingdom) Damon Hill	(United Kingdom) Damon Hill	(United Kingdom) Damon Hill	(United Kingdom) Williams-Renault	Report
12	(Hungary) Hungarian Grand Prix	(Germany) Michael Schumacher	(United Kingdom) Damon Hill	(Canada) Jacques Villeneuve	(United Kingdom) Williams-Renault	Report
13	(Belgium) Belgian Grand Prix	(Canada) Jacques Villeneuve	(Austria) Gerhard Berger	(Germany) Michael Schumacher	(Italy) Ferrari	Report
14	(Italy) Italian Grand Prix	(United Kingdom) Damon Hill	(Germany) Michael Schumacher	(Germany) Michael Schumacher	(Italy) Ferrari	Report
15	(Portugal) Portuguese Grand Prix	(United Kingdom) Damon Hill	(Canada) Jacques Villeneuve	(Canada) Jacques Villeneuve	(United Kingdom) Williams-Renault	Report
16	(Japan) Japanese Grand Prix	(Canada) Jacques Villeneuve	(Canada) Jacques Villeneuve	(United Kingdom) Damon Hill	(United Kingdom) Williams-Renault	Report

=== Points scoring system ===
Points are awarded to the top six classified finishers in each race for the drivers' and constructors' championships.

Position	1st	2nd	3rd	4th	5th	6th
Points	10	6	4	3	2	1

=== World Drivers' Championship standings ===
Pos.	Driver	AUS (Australia)	BRA (Brazil)	ARG (Argentina)	EUR (Germany)	SMR (Italy)	MON (Monaco)	ESP (Spain)	CAN (Canada)	FRA (France)	GBR (United Kingdom)	GER (Germany)	HUN (Hungary)	BEL (Belgium)	ITA (Italy)	POR (Portugal)	JPN (Japan)	Points
1	(United Kingdom) Damon Hill	1	1^{P}^{F}	1^{P}	4^{P}^{F}	1^{F}	Ret	Ret^{P}	1^{P}	1	Ret^{P}	1^{P}^{F}	2^{F}	5	Ret^{P}	2^{P}	1	97
2	(Canada) Jacques Villeneuve	2^{P}^{F}	Ret	2	1	11^{†}	Ret	3	2^{F}	2^{F}	1^{F}	3	1	2^{P}	7	1^{F}	Ret^{P}^{F}	78
3	(Germany) Michael Schumacher	Ret	3	Ret	2	2^{P}	Ret^{P}	1^{F}	Ret	DNS^{P}	Ret	4	9^{P}^{†}	1	1^{F}	3	2	59
4	(France) Jean Alesi	Ret	2	3^{F}	Ret	6	Ret^{F}	2	3	3	Ret	2	3	4	2	4	Ret	47
5	(Finland) Mika Häkkinen	5	4	Ret	8	8^{†}	6^{†}	5	5	5	3	Ret	4	3	3	Ret	3	31
6	(Austria) Gerhard Berger	4	Ret	Ret	9	3	Ret	Ret	Ret	4	2	13^{†}	Ret	6^{F}	Ret	6	4	21
7	(United Kingdom) David Coulthard	Ret	Ret	7	3	Ret	2	Ret	4	6	5	5	Ret	Ret	Ret	13	8	18
8	(Brazil) Rubens Barrichello	Ret	Ret	4	5	5	Ret	Ret	Ret	9	4	6	6	Ret	5	Ret	9	14
9	(France) Olivier Panis	7	6	8	Ret	Ret	1	Ret	Ret	7	Ret	7	5	Ret	Ret	10	7	13
10	(United Kingdom) Eddie Irvine	3	7	5	Ret	4	7^{†}	Ret	Ret	Ret	Ret	Ret	Ret	Ret	Ret	5	Ret	11
11	(United Kingdom) Martin Brundle	Ret	12^{†}	Ret	6	Ret	Ret	Ret	6	8	6	10	Ret	Ret	4	9	5	8
12	(Germany) Heinz-Harald Frentzen	8	Ret	Ret	Ret	Ret	4^{†}	4	Ret	Ret	8	8	Ret	Ret	Ret	7	6	7
13	(Finland) Mika Salo	6	5	Ret	DSQ	Ret	5^{†}	DSQ	Ret	10	7	9	Ret	7	Ret	11	Ret	5
14	(United Kingdom) Johnny Herbert	DNS	Ret	9	7	Ret	3	Ret	7	DSQ	9	Ret	Ret	Ret	9^{†}	8	10	4
15	(Brazil) Pedro Diniz	10	8	Ret	10	7	Ret	6	Ret	Ret	Ret	Ret	Ret	Ret	6	Ret	Ret	2
16	(Netherlands) Jos Verstappen	Ret	Ret	6	Ret	Ret	Ret	Ret	Ret	Ret	10	Ret	Ret	Ret	8	Ret	11	1
17	(Japan) Ukyo Katayama	11	9	Ret	DSQ	Ret	Ret	Ret	Ret	Ret	Ret	Ret	7	8	10	12	Ret	0
18	(Brazil) Ricardo Rosset	9	Ret	Ret	11	Ret	Ret	Ret	Ret	11	Ret	11	8	9	Ret	14	13	0
19	(Italy) Giancarlo Fisichella	Ret			13	Ret	Ret	Ret	8	Ret	11							0
20	(Portugal) Pedro Lamy	Ret	10	Ret	12	9	Ret	Ret	Ret	12	Ret	12	Ret	10	Ret	16	12	0
21	(Italy) Luca Badoer	DNQ	11	Ret	DNQ	10	Ret	DNQ	Ret	Ret	DNQ	DNP						0
22	(Italy) Giovanni Lavaggi											DNQ	10^{†}	DNQ	Ret	15	DNQ	0
23	(Italy) Andrea Montermini	DNQ	Ret	10	DNQ	DNQ	DNS	DNQ	Ret	Ret	DNQ	DNP						0
—	(Brazil) Tarso Marques		Ret	Ret														0
Pos.	Driver	AUS (Australia)	BRA (Brazil)	ARG (Argentina)	EUR (Germany)	SMR (Italy)	MON (Monaco)	ESP (Spain)	CAN (Canada)	FRA (France)	GBR (United Kingdom)	GER (Germany)	HUN (Hungary)	BEL (Belgium)	ITA (Italy)	POR (Portugal)	JPN (Japan)	Points

Key
Colour	Result
Gold	Winner
Silver	Second place
Bronze	Third place
Green	Other points position
Blue	Other classified position
Blue	Not classified, finished (NC)
Purple	Not classified, retired (Ret)
Red	Did not qualify (DNQ)
Black	Disqualified (DSQ)
White	Did not start (DNS)
White	Race cancelled (C)
Blank	Did not practice (DNP)
Blank	Excluded (EX)
Blank	Did not arrive (DNA)
Blank	Withdrawn (WD)
Blank	Did not enter (empty cell)
Annotation	Meaning
P	Pole position
F	Fastest lap

Notes:

- † – Driver did not finish the Grand Prix but was classified, as he completed more than 90% of the race distance.

=== World Constructors' Championship standings ===
Pos.	Constructor	No.	AUS (Australia)	BRA (Brazil)	ARG (Argentina)	EUR (Germany)	SMR (Italy)	MON (Monaco)	ESP (Spain)	CAN (Canada)	FRA (France)	GBR (United Kingdom)	GER (Germany)	HUN (Hungary)	BEL (Belgium)	ITA (Italy)	POR (Portugal)	JPN (Japan)	Points
1	(United Kingdom) Williams-Renault	5	1	1^{P}^{F}	1^{P}	4^{P}^{F}	1^{F}	Ret	Ret^{P}	1^{P}	1	Ret^{P}	1^{P}^{F}	2^{F}	5	Ret^{P}	2^{P}	1	175
1	(United Kingdom) Williams-Renault	6	2^{P}^{F}	Ret	2	1	11^{†}	Ret	3	2^{F}	2^{F}	1^{F}	3	1	2^{P}	7	1^{F}	Ret^{P}^{F}	175
2	(Italy) Ferrari	1	Ret	3	Ret	2	2^{P}	Ret^{P}	1^{F}	Ret	DNS^{P}	Ret	4	9^{P}^{†}	1	1^{F}	3	2	70
2	(Italy) Ferrari	2	3	7	5	Ret	4	7^{†}	Ret	Ret	Ret	Ret	Ret	Ret	Ret	Ret	5	Ret	70
3	(Italy) Benetton-Renault	3	Ret	2	3^{F}	Ret	6	Ret^{F}	2	3	3	Ret	2	3	4	2	4	Ret	68
3	(Italy) Benetton-Renault	4	4	Ret	Ret	9	3	Ret	Ret	Ret	4	2	13^{†}	Ret	6^{F}	Ret	6	4	68
4	(United Kingdom) McLaren-Mercedes	7	5	4	Ret	8	8^{†}	6^{†}	5	5	5	3	Ret	4	3	3	Ret	3	49
4	(United Kingdom) McLaren-Mercedes	8	Ret	Ret	7	3	Ret	2	Ret	4	6	5	5	Ret	Ret	Ret	13	8	49
5	(Republic of Ireland) Jordan-Peugeot	11	Ret	Ret	4	5	5	Ret	Ret	Ret	9	4	6	6	Ret	5	Ret	9	22
5	(Republic of Ireland) Jordan-Peugeot	12	Ret	12	Ret	6	Ret	Ret	Ret	6	8	6	10	Ret	Ret	4	9	5	22
6	(France) Ligier-Mugen-Honda	9	7	6	8	Ret	Ret	1	Ret	Ret	7	Ret	7	5	Ret	Ret	10	7	15
6	(France) Ligier-Mugen-Honda	10	10	8	Ret	10	7	Ret	6	Ret	Ret	Ret	Ret	Ret	Ret	6	Ret	Ret	15
7	(Switzerland) Sauber-Ford	14	DNS	Ret	9	7	Ret	3	Ret	7	DSQ	9	Ret	Ret	Ret	9^{†}	8	10	11
7	(Switzerland) Sauber-Ford	15	8	Ret	Ret	Ret	Ret	4^{†}	4	Ret	Ret	8	8	Ret	Ret	Ret	7	6	11
8	(United Kingdom) Tyrrell-Yamaha	18	11	9	Ret	DSQ	Ret	Ret	Ret	Ret	Ret	Ret	Ret	7	8	10	12	Ret	5
8	(United Kingdom) Tyrrell-Yamaha	19	6	5	Ret	DSQ	Ret	5^{†}	DSQ	Ret	10	7	9	Ret	7	Ret	11	Ret	5
9	(United Kingdom) Footwork-Hart	16	9	Ret	Ret	11	Ret	Ret	Ret	Ret	11	Ret	11	8	9	Ret	14	13	1
9	(United Kingdom) Footwork-Hart	17	Ret	Ret	6	Ret	Ret	Ret	Ret	Ret	Ret	10	Ret	Ret	Ret	8	Ret	11	1
—	(Italy) Minardi-Ford	20	Ret	10	Ret	12	9	Ret	Ret	Ret	12	Ret	12	Ret	10	Ret	16	12	0
—	(Italy) Minardi-Ford	21	Ret	Ret	Ret	13	Ret	Ret	Ret	8	Ret	11	DNQ	10^{†}	DNQ	Ret	15	DNQ	0
—	(Italy) Forti-Ford	22	DNQ	11	Ret	DNQ	10	Ret	DNQ	Ret	Ret	DNQ	DNP						0
—	(Italy) Forti-Ford	23	DNQ	Ret	10	DNQ	DNQ	DNS	DNQ	Ret	Ret	DNQ	DNP						0
Pos.	Constructor	No.	AUS (Australia)	BRA (Brazil)	ARG (Argentina)	EUR (Germany)	SMR (Italy)	MON (Monaco)	ESP (Spain)	CAN (Canada)	FRA (France)	GBR (United Kingdom)	GER (Germany)	HUN (Hungary)	BEL (Belgium)	ITA (Italy)	POR (Portugal)	JPN (Japan)	Points

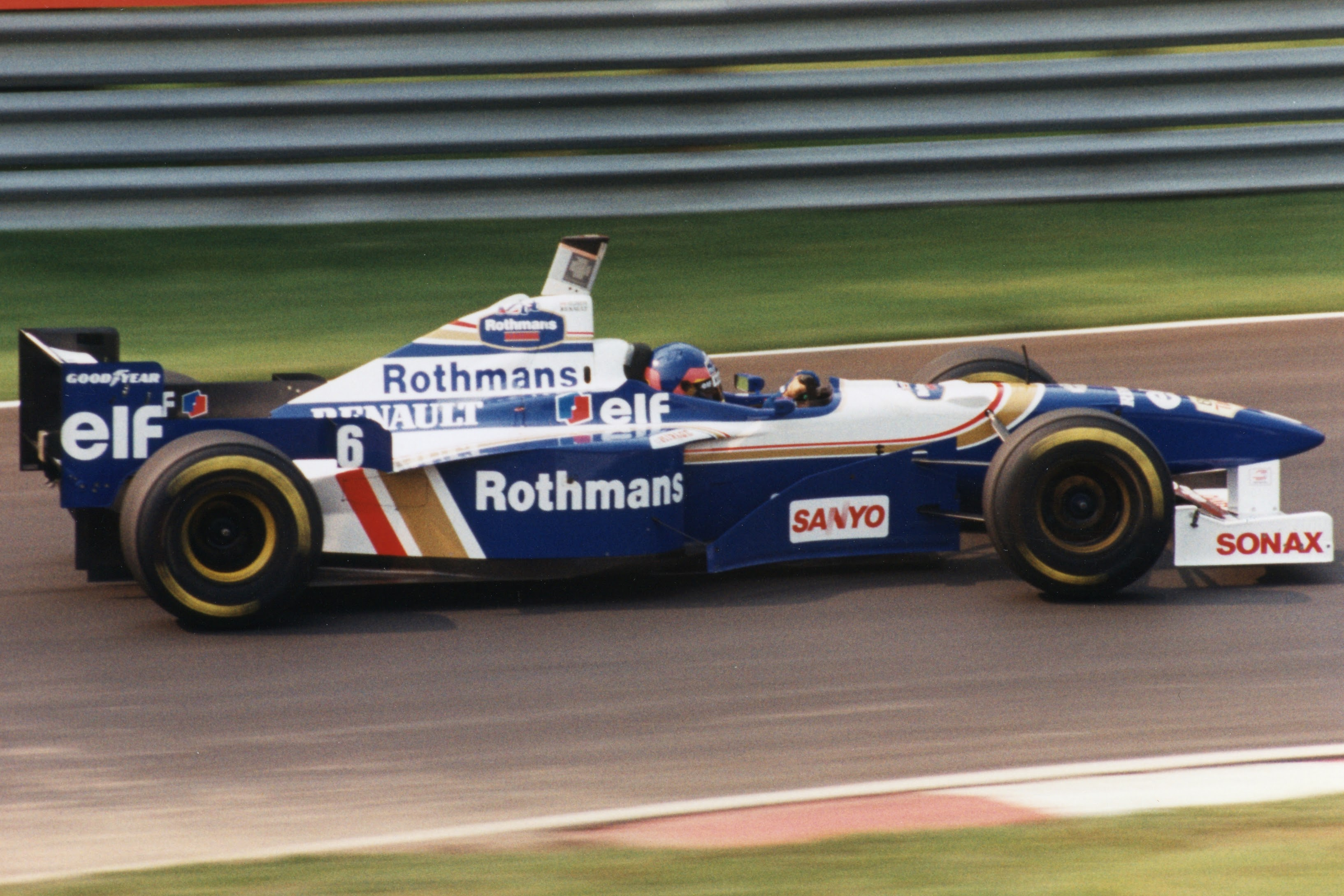
Williams-Renault won the Constructors' Championship with the FW18

Notes:

- † – Driver did not finish the Grand Prix but was classified, as he completed more than 90% of the race distance.

== Non-championship event results ==
The 1996 season also included a single event which did not count towards the World Championship, the Formula One Indoor Trophy at the Bologna Motor Show. This is to date the final competitive non-championship event in Formula One history, as the event would cater to Formula 3000 machinery from 1997 onwards.

Race name	Venue	Date	Winning driver	Constructor	Report
(Italy) Formula One Indoor Trophy	Bologna Motor Show	7–8 December	(Italy) Giancarlo Fisichella	(Italy) Benetton	Report
