= 1996 Australian Grand Prix =

Race 1 of 16 in the 1996 Formula One World Championship
← Previous race	Next race →

Race details
- Date: 10 March 1996
- Official name: 1996 Transurban Australian Grand Prix
- Location: Melbourne Grand Prix Circuit; Melbourne, Australia
- Course: Temporary street circuit
- Course length: 5.302 km (3.295 miles)
- Distance: 58 laps, 307.516 km (191.110 miles)
- Weather: Dry with temperatures reaching up to 23 °C (73 °F)

Pole position
Driver	(Canada) Jacques Villeneuve	Williams-Renault
- Time: 1:32.371

Fastest lap
Driver	(Canada) Jacques Villeneuve	Williams-Renault
- Time: 1:33.421 on lap 27

Podium
First	(United Kingdom) Damon Hill	Williams-Renault
Second	(Canada) Jacques Villeneuve	Williams-Renault
Third	(United Kingdom) Eddie Irvine	Ferrari

The 1996 Australian Grand Prix (officially the 1996 Transurban Australian Grand Prix) was a Formula One motor race held at Melbourne on 10 March 1996. It was the first race of the 1996 Formula One World Championship, and the first Australian Grand Prix to be held at Melbourne, taking over from Adelaide.

The 58-lap race was won by Damon Hill, driving a Williams-Renault. Hill's teammate Jacques Villeneuve, making his Formula One debut, took pole position and led for most of the race, before an oil leak enabled Hill to catch and pass him in the closing laps. Eddie Irvine finished third in a Ferrari.

== Report ==
=== Background ===
This was the second Grand Prix in a row held in Australia, the previous race being the conclusion to the 1995 season.

Taki Inoue was scheduled to race for the Minardi team as a pay driver but when no money materialised prior to the race he was replaced by Giancarlo Fisichella. Marlboro had expressed interest in Fisichella running early on.

The race was the first to use the new race-start system, still used in Formula 1 today, replacing the old red to green light system. Under the new system, five red lights would come on at one second intervals, starting after the last driver reached his grid box. There would then be a pre-determined pause, and then the five lights would go off simultaneously. This was also the first race to have a single qualifying session on Saturday afternoon; the Friday session was dropped.

=== Qualifying ===
Jacques Villeneuve, the reigning IndyCar champion, took pole position for his first Grand Prix ahead of team mate Hill. The second row of the grid was taken by the two Ferrari cars, with Eddie Irvine surprisingly ahead of Michael Schumacher.

Both Forti cars failed make the race due to the new 107% rule for qualifying, which stated that any car that qualified 107% slower than the pole time (1:38.837 in this race) would be excluded. The measure was introduced as excessively slow entrants presented potential safety hazards due to a high speed difference. Incidentally, the team had logged its best result of 7th one race earlier at the season-ending 1995 Australian Grand Prix.

=== Race ===
Pedro Lamy started from the pit lane due to a clutch problem, while on the formation lap Heinz-Harald Frentzen stopped with an electrical problem. It was an all-Williams front row with Damon Hill and debutant Jacques Villeneuve in the blue and white Rothmans cars. As the red lights went out, a flurry of yellow flags revealed that both Tyrrell cars had stalled meaning 16 cars actually got away.

In the first corner Hill momentarily lost control and slid wide, losing momentum and enabling Irvine and Schumacher to overtake through Turn 2. On the run down to the third corner, the field bunched to the right hand side of the track with Rubens Barrichello fending off Olivier Panis. This began a chain reaction of heavy braking as drivers tried to avoid colliding with one another, and David Coulthard veered left under braking and his McLaren hit the side of Johnny Herbert's Sauber. Herbert tried to avoid the car and braked heavily. Martin Brundle was behind them and unable to slow sufficiently, hitting the rear of Herbert's and Coulthard's cars and was launched into a barrel roll, ending in a sand trap at turn 3 and breaking his car in two. Brundle was unhurt. The race was halted to allow the circuit to be cleared.

The race was restarted, with Herbert a non-starter as team mate Frentzen took the spare Sauber. Brundle started from the pit lane in the spare Jordan, and spun off on lap 2 after light contact with Pedro Diniz. The Williams dominated again, with Villeneuve leading Hill. Schumacher quickly passed Irvine and held third place, but dropped back half a minute with his second pit stop. He developed brake problems on lap 28 and retired five laps later. Irvine assumed third, having survived contact with Jean Alesi's Benetton on lap 6, when Alesi had attempted to pass him. The Williams team employed a one stop strategy with Hill emerging from his stop just ahead of Villeneuve, who immediately retook the lead. Soon after, Villeneuve had an off at the first corner, and was later hampered by an oil leak. The Williams team showed a SLOW signal as his oil pressure was dropping, which enabled Hill to catch and pass him; taking his 14th Grand Prix victory and equalling his father Graham's overall number of wins. Villeneuve was second and Irvine third on his Ferrari debut.

Hill therefore took back to back Australian Grand Prix victories, the previous race being the last round of 1995, in Adelaide.

== Classification ==
=== Qualifying ===
Pos	No	Driver	Constructor	Time	Gap
1	6	(Canada) Jacques Villeneuve	Williams-Renault	1:32.371	
2	5	(United Kingdom) Damon Hill	Williams-Renault	1:32.509	+0.138
3	2	(United Kingdom) Eddie Irvine	Ferrari	1:32.889	+0.518
4	1	(Germany) Michael Schumacher	Ferrari	1:33.125	+0.754
5	7	(Finland) Mika Häkkinen	McLaren-Mercedes	1:34.054	+1.683
6	3	(France) Jean Alesi	Benetton-Renault	1:34.257	+1.886
7	4	(Austria) Gerhard Berger	Benetton-Renault	1:34.344	+1.973
8	11	(Brazil) Rubens Barrichello	Jordan-Peugeot	1:34.474	+2.103
9	15	(Germany) Heinz-Harald Frentzen	Sauber-Ford	1:34.494	+2.123
10	19	(Finland) Mika Salo	Tyrrell-Yamaha	1:34.832	+2.461
11	9	(France) Olivier Panis	Ligier-Mugen-Honda	1:35.330	+2.959
12	17	(Netherlands) Jos Verstappen	Footwork-Hart	1:35.338	+2.967
13	8	(United Kingdom) David Coulthard	McLaren-Mercedes	1:35.351	+2.980
14	14	(United Kingdom) Johnny Herbert	Sauber-Ford	1:35.453	+3.082
15	18	(Japan) Ukyo Katayama	Tyrrell-Yamaha	1:35.715	+3.344
16	21	(Italy) Giancarlo Fisichella	Minardi-Ford	1:35.898	+3.527
17	20	(Portugal) Pedro Lamy	Minardi-Ford	1:36.109	+3.738
18	16	(Brazil) Ricardo Rosset	Footwork-Hart	1:36.198	+3.827
19	12	(United Kingdom) Martin Brundle	Jordan-Peugeot	1:36.286	+3.915
20	10	(Brazil) Pedro Diniz	Ligier-Mugen-Honda	1:36.298	+3.927
107% time: 1:38.837
DNQ	22	(Italy) Luca Badoer	Forti-Ford	1:39.202	+6.831
DNQ	23	(Italy) Andrea Montermini	Forti-Ford	1:42.087	+9.716

=== Race ===
Pos	No	Driver	Constructor	Laps	Time/Retired	Grid	Points
1	5	(United Kingdom) Damon Hill	Williams-Renault	58	1:32:50.491	2	10
2	6	(Canada) Jacques Villeneuve	Williams-Renault	58	+38.020	1	6
3	2	(United Kingdom) Eddie Irvine	Ferrari	58	+1:02.571	3	4
4	4	(Austria) Gerhard Berger	Benetton-Renault	58	+1:17.037	7	3
5	7	(Finland) Mika Häkkinen	McLaren-Mercedes	58	+1:35.071	5	2
6	19	(Finland) Mika Salo	Tyrrell-Yamaha	57	+1 lap	10	1
7	9	(France) Olivier Panis	Ligier-Mugen-Honda	57	+1 lap	11	
8	15	(Germany) Heinz-Harald Frentzen	Sauber-Ford	57	+1 lap	9	
9	16	(Brazil) Ricardo Rosset	Footwork-Hart	56	+2 laps	18	
10	10	(Brazil) Pedro Diniz	Ligier-Mugen-Honda	56	+2 laps	20	
11	18	(Japan) Ukyo Katayama	Tyrrell-Yamaha	55	+3 laps	15	
Ret	20	(Portugal) Pedro Lamy	Minardi-Ford	42	Safety belt	17	
Ret	1	(Germany) Michael Schumacher	Ferrari	32	Brakes	4	
Ret	21	(Italy) Giancarlo Fisichella	Minardi-Ford	32	Clutch	16	
Ret	11	(Brazil) Rubens Barrichello	Jordan-Peugeot	29	Engine	8	
Ret	8	(United Kingdom) David Coulthard	McLaren-Mercedes	24	Throttle	13	
Ret	17	(Netherlands) Jos Verstappen	Footwork-Hart	15	Engine	12	
Ret	3	(France) Jean Alesi	Benetton-Renault	9	Collision	6	
Ret	12	(United Kingdom) Martin Brundle	Jordan-Peugeot	1	Collision	19	
DNS	14	(United Kingdom) Johnny Herbert	Sauber-Ford	0	Collision^{1}	14	
DNQ	22	(Italy) Luca Badoer	Forti-Ford		107% rule		
DNQ	23	(Italy) Andrea Montermini	Forti-Ford		107% rule		

Notes

- ^1 – Herbert is listed as 'Did Not Start' (DNS) in the official results, despite having taken the first start prior to the race being stopped. Regulations at the time were such that in the event of a stoppage being ordered on the first lap, that start would be deemed null and void, and the second start would take place as if the first had never occurred. As he did not make the second start, he’s classified as DNS. His place on grid was left vacant.

== Championship standings after the race ==
Drivers' Championship standings

Pos	Driver	Points
1	(United Kingdom) Damon Hill	10
2	(Canada) Jacques Villeneuve	6
3	(United Kingdom) Eddie Irvine	4
4	(Austria) Gerhard Berger	3
5	(Finland) Mika Häkkinen	2

Constructors' Championship standings

Pos	Constructor	Points
1	(United Kingdom) Williams-Renault	16
2	(Italy) Ferrari	4
3	(Italy) Benetton-Renault	3
4	(United Kingdom) McLaren-Mercedes	2
5	(United Kingdom) Tyrrell-Yamaha	1

- Note: Only the top five positions are included for both sets of standings.

Previous race: 1995 Australian Grand Prix	FIA Formula One World Championship; 1996 season	Next race: 1996 Brazilian Grand Prix
Previous race: 1995 Australian Grand Prix	Australian Grand Prix	Next race: 1997 Australian Grand Prix
Awards
Preceded by 1995 Australian Grand Prix	Formula One Promotional Trophy for Race Promoter; 1996	Succeeded by 1997 Australian Grand Prix
