= 1996 British Grand Prix =

Race 10 of 16 in the 1996 Formula One World Championship
← Previous race	Next race →
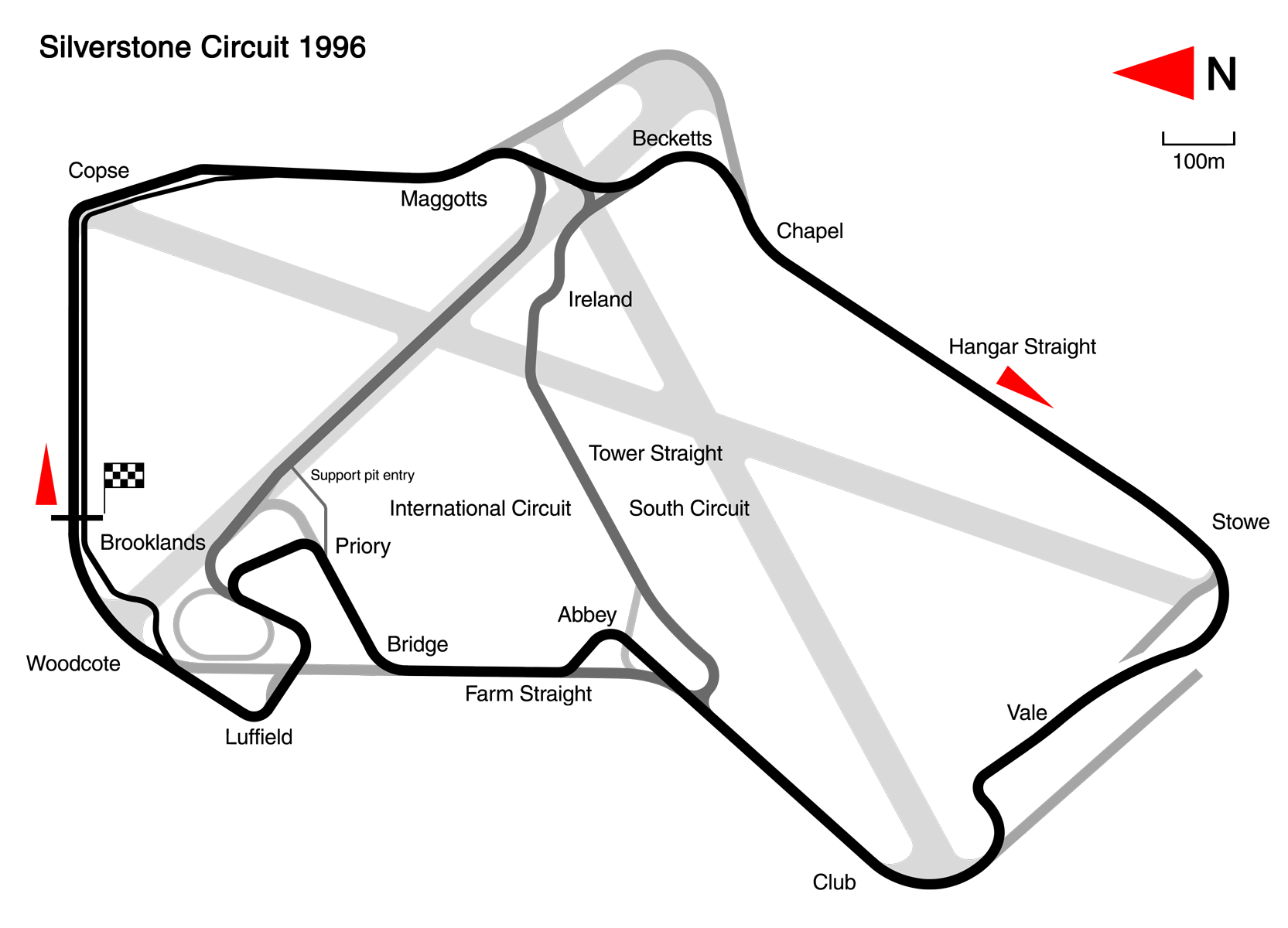
- Silverstone Circuit (as modified in 1996)

Race details
- Date: 14 July 1996
- Official name: XLIX British Grand Prix
- Location: Silverstone Circuit; Silverstone, Northamptonshire, England
- Course: Permanent racing facility
- Course length: 5.072 km (3.152 miles)
- Distance: 61 laps, 309.392 km (192.247 miles)
- Weather: Warm and sunny with temperatures reaching up to 25 °C (77 °F)

Pole position
Driver	(United Kingdom) Damon Hill	Williams-Renault
- Time: 1:26.875

Fastest lap
Driver	(Canada) Jacques Villeneuve	Williams-Renault
- Time: 1:29.288 on lap 21

Podium
First	(Canada) Jacques Villeneuve	Williams-Renault
Second	(Austria) Gerhard Berger	Benetton-Renault
Third	(Finland) Mika Häkkinen	McLaren-Mercedes

The 1996 British Grand Prix was a Formula One motor race held at Silverstone on 14 July 1996. It was the tenth race of the 1996 Formula One World Championship.

Williams' Jacques Villeneuve took his second win of the season from Benetton's Gerhard Berger, with McLaren's Mika Häkkinen coming home third for his first podium since his near-fatal crash at 1995 Australian Grand Prix. Jordan's Rubens Barrichello took fourth, equalling his best finish of the season, and it came after he had been involved in late collisions while racing for fourth place at the circuit in the previous two years. The final points went to David Coulthard in the second McLaren and Martin Brundle in the second Jordan.

Damon Hill took pole position for his home race, but made a slow start and retired shortly before half distance, after a wheel nut problem caused him to spin off at Copse Corner while he was trying to pass Häkkinen. For the third consecutive race, Ferrari drivers Michael Schumacher and Eddie Irvine were both forced to retire with technical issues in the first six laps – Schumacher with hydraulic problems and Irvine with a differential failure. Jean Alesi would become another notable retirement on lap 45 from 3rd place, just ahead of teammate Gerhard Berger when his rear brakes overheated.

== Classification ==
=== Qualifying ===
Pos	No	Driver	Constructor	Time	Diff.	Grid
1	5	(United Kingdom) Damon Hill	Williams-Renault	1:26.875		1
2	6	(Canada) Jacques Villeneuve	Williams-Renault	1:27.070	+0.195	2
3	1	(Germany) Michael Schumacher	Ferrari	1:27.707	+0.832	3
4	7	(Finland) Mika Häkkinen	McLaren-Mercedes	1:27.856	+0.981	4
5	3	(France) Jean Alesi	Benetton-Renault	1:28.307	+1.432	5
6	11	(Brazil) Rubens Barrichello	Jordan-Peugeot	1:28.409	+1.534	6
7	4	(Austria) Gerhard Berger	Benetton-Renault	1:28.653	+1.778	7
8	12	(United Kingdom) Martin Brundle	Jordan-Peugeot	1:28.946	+2.071	8
9	8	(United Kingdom) David Coulthard	McLaren-Mercedes	1:28.966	+2.091	9
10	2	(United Kingdom) Eddie Irvine	Ferrari	1:29.186	+2.311	10
11	15	(Germany) Heinz-Harald Frentzen	Sauber-Ford	1:29.591	+2.716	11
12	18	(Japan) Ukyo Katayama	Tyrrell-Yamaha	1:29.913	+3.038	12
13	14	(United Kingdom) Johnny Herbert	Sauber-Ford	1:29.947	+3.072	13
14	19	(Finland) Mika Salo	Tyrrell-Yamaha	1:29.949	+3.074	14
15	17	(Netherlands) Jos Verstappen	Footwork-Hart	1:30.102	+3.227	15
16	9	(France) Olivier Panis	Ligier-Mugen-Honda	1:30.167	+3.292	16
17	10	(Brazil) Pedro Diniz	Ligier-Mugen-Honda	1:31.076	+4.201	17
18	21	(Italy) Giancarlo Fisichella	Minardi-Ford	1:31.365	+4.490	18
19	20	(Portugal) Pedro Lamy	Minardi-Ford	1:31.454	+4.579	19
107% time: 1:32.956
—	23	(Italy) Andrea Montermini	Forti-Ford	1:35.206	+8.331	DNQ
—	22	(Italy) Luca Badoer	Forti-Ford	1:35.304	+8.429	DNQ
EX	16	(Brazil) Ricardo Rosset	Footwork-Hart	No time		20^{1}
Sources:

- ^1 Rosset was excluded after missing an FIA weight check. He was allowed to start at the back of the grid.

=== Race ===
Pos	No	Driver	Constructor	Laps	Time/Retired	Grid	Points
1	6	(Canada) Jacques Villeneuve	Williams-Renault	61	1:33:00.874	2	10
2	4	(Austria) Gerhard Berger	Benetton-Renault	61	+ 19.026	7	6
3	7	(Finland) Mika Häkkinen	McLaren-Mercedes	61	+ 50.830	4	4
4	11	(Brazil) Rubens Barrichello	Jordan-Peugeot	61	+ 1:06.716	6	3
5	8	(United Kingdom) David Coulthard	McLaren-Mercedes	61	+ 1:22.507	9	2
6	12	(United Kingdom) Martin Brundle	Jordan-Peugeot	60	+ 1 lap	8	1
7	19	(Finland) Mika Salo	Tyrrell-Yamaha	60	+ 1 lap	14	
8	15	(Germany) Heinz-Harald Frentzen	Sauber-Ford	60	+ 1 lap	11	
9	14	(United Kingdom) Johnny Herbert	Sauber-Ford	60	+ 1 lap	13	
10	17	(Netherlands) Jos Verstappen	Footwork-Hart	60	+ 1 lap	15	
11	21	(Italy) Giancarlo Fisichella	Minardi-Ford	59	+ 2 laps	18	
Ret	3	(France) Jean Alesi	Benetton-Renault	44	Wheel bearing	5	
Ret	9	(France) Olivier Panis	Ligier-Mugen-Honda	40	Handling	16	
Ret	10	(Brazil) Pedro Diniz	Ligier-Mugen-Honda	38	Engine	17	
Ret	5	(United Kingdom) Damon Hill	Williams-Renault	26	Wheel nut	1	
Ret	20	(Portugal) Pedro Lamy	Minardi-Ford	21	Gearbox	19	
Ret	16	(Brazil) Ricardo Rosset	Footwork-Hart	13	Electrical	20	
Ret	18	(Japan) Ukyo Katayama	Tyrrell-Yamaha	12	Timing belt	12	
Ret	2	(United Kingdom) Eddie Irvine	Ferrari	5	Differential	10	
Ret	1	(Germany) Michael Schumacher	Ferrari	3	Hydraulics	3	

== Notes ==
- Last race: Forti
- Last race: Andrea Montermini
- Ricardo Rosset's qualifying times (best 1:30.529) were scratched after he missed the FIA weight check, dropping him from 17th to 20th on the grid.

== Championship standings after the race ==
Drivers' Championship standings

Pos	Driver	Points
1	(United Kingdom) Damon Hill	63
2	(Canada) Jacques Villeneuve	48
3	(Germany) Michael Schumacher	26
4	(France) Jean Alesi	25
5	(Austria) Gerhard Berger	16

Constructors' Championship standings

Pos	Constructor	Points
1	(United Kingdom) Williams-Renault	111
2	(Italy) Benetton-Renault	41
3	(Italy) Ferrari	35
4	(United Kingdom) McLaren-Mercedes	32
5	(Republic of Ireland) Jordan-Peugeot	13

- Note: Only the top five positions are included for both sets of standings.

Previous race: 1996 French Grand Prix	FIA Formula One World Championship; 1996 season	Next race: 1996 German Grand Prix
Previous race: 1995 British Grand Prix	British Grand Prix	Next race: 1997 British Grand Prix
