= 1995 Australian Grand Prix =

581st Formula 1 Championship Grand Prix

Race 17 of 17 in the 1995 Formula One World Championship
| ← Previous race | Next race → |

Race details
- Date: 12 November 1995
- Official name: LX EDS Australian Grand Prix
- Location: Adelaide Street Circuit, Adelaide, Australia
- Course: Temporary street circuit
- Course length: 3.780 km (2.362 miles)
- Distance: 81 laps, 306.180 km (191.362 miles)
- Weather: Sunny
- Attendance: 520,000

Pole position
| Driver | (United Kingdom) Damon Hill | Williams-Renault |
- Time: 1:15.505

Fastest lap
| Driver | (United Kingdom) Damon Hill | Williams-Renault |
- Time: 1:17.943 on lap 16

Podium
| First | (United Kingdom) Damon Hill | Williams-Renault |
| Second | (France) Olivier Panis | Ligier-Mugen-Honda |
| Third | (Italy) Gianni Morbidelli | Footwork-Hart |

The 1995 Australian Grand Prix (officially the LX EDS Australian Grand Prix) was a Formula One motor race held on 12 November 1995 at the Adelaide Street Circuit, Adelaide. The race, contested over 81 laps, was the seventeenth and final race of the 1995 Formula One season, and the eleventh and last Australian Grand Prix to be held at Adelaide before the event moved to Melbourne the following year. This would also prove to be the last Grand Prix for Mark Blundell, Bertrand Gachot, Roberto Moreno, Taki Inoue, and Karl Wendlinger. This was also the last race for Pacific as they folded at the end of the season.

In a race of attrition, all the front-running cars retired except for the pole-sitting Williams-Renault of Damon Hill. Hill won by two clear laps, only the second time this had been achieved in Formula One history. Ligier-Mugen-Honda driver Olivier Panis was second, with Gianni Morbidelli achieving his best-ever F1 result with third in a Footwork-Hart. Of the 23 drivers who started, only eight finished, the lowest number in the 1995 season. As of 2026, this is the last time the race winner lapped every other competitor. This was also the last race that used the traffic light system with coloured lights (red and green) at the start (system used since the 1975 British Grand Prix).

The Grand Prix had a record attendance of 520,000 during the weekend, with 210,000 on race day, a Formula One record until 2000, when 250,000 people attended that year's United States Grand Prix at Indianapolis. This race would mark the last until the 1997 Australian Grand Prix that 24 cars would be entered into a Grand Prix race weekend. However only 22 of the 24 entrants started, as Luca Badoer had mechanical problems with his Minardi, and Mika Häkkinen withdrew having sustained serious injuries following a crash during the first qualifying session.

== Report ==
=== Pre-race ===
Heading into the final round of the 1995 Formula One season, both the Drivers' Championship and Constructors' Championship were already settled, with Michael Schumacher having claimed the Drivers' Championship two rounds earlier at the Pacific Grand Prix. It was Schumacher's last race with the Benetton team, before his move to Ferrari for the 1996 season. Benetton had claimed the Constructors' Championship at the previous event, the Japanese Grand Prix, with Williams too many points behind to be able to catch them. It was announced beforehand that it would be the last Formula One event to be held at the Adelaide Street Circuit, with the Australian Grand Prix moving to Melbourne Grand Prix Circuit in Melbourne from the 1996 season.

In the Friday afternoon qualifying session, Mika Häkkinen in his McLaren car suffered a puncture in his left rear tyre heading towards Brewery Bend. This caused him to lose control, become airborne and crash heavily into a tyre barrier at 120 mph. The impact caused his helmet to strike the steering wheel, fracturing his skull. Within seconds he was attended by two doctors who were stationed at the corner, who found Häkkinen unresponsive and with a blocked airway. Häkkinen later said that he was aware of what had happened immediately after the impact, but subsequently lost consciousness. Unable to establish an airway, the doctors performed an emergency tracheotomy before taking him to the nearby Royal Adelaide Hospital. Häkkinen would recover in time to race the following season.

The Williams cars dominated qualifying, with Damon Hill in pole position and David Coulthard alongside him. Schumacher was third in his Benetton, with the Ferrari drivers fourth and fifth, Gerhard Berger ahead of Jean Alesi. Heinz-Harald Frentzen rounded out the top six in his Sauber.

=== Race ===
The race took place in the afternoon from 14:00 ACDT (UTC+10:30). Hill lost the lead to Coulthard at the start. Schumacher also lost ground at the start, with Berger moving into third and Alesi moving into fourth. Schumacher made his way back up to third, overtaking Alesi on lap one, before overtaking Berger a few laps later. Coulthard kept the lead until the first round of pitstops. However, he came into the pitlane too fast, locking his front tyres and running into the pitwall. He was forced to retire from the race. A few laps later, Forti's Roberto Moreno had spun and caused terminal damage to his suspension in the same place where Coulthard had crashed earlier.

After the first round of pitstops, Schumacher and Alesi collided, with both retiring. Schumacher's Benetton team-mate, Johnny Herbert took second place briefly before coming in for his first stop later than many of the other drivers, while surviving a potential accident in which he missed the pit entry and rejoined the track. Berger was promoted to second, but his Ferrari encountered an engine problem, forcing him to retire. This promoted Frentzen to second, but he too retired due to a gearbox problem. With many of the front-runners out, Hill led at the front, even with a 22-second botched pit stop, with Herbert second. Jordan driver Eddie Irvine rounded out the top three, before retiring after losing all of his pneumatic pressure. Herbert was still second, and looked set as a result to claim third place in the Drivers' Championship. However, he was forced out of the race as his Benetton suffered a driveshaft failure. Olivier Panis was now second in his Ligier a lap behind Hill, with Footwork driver Gianni Morbidelli third, two laps down. With a few laps remaining, Panis' Ligier was suffering an oil leak, and Hill lapped him for a second time on his way to victory. Panis remained second, with Morbidelli third for his only career podium, and the first podium for the Footwork/Arrows team in six years. Behind the top three, Mark Blundell was fourth in the sole McLaren, with Mika Salo fifth in the Tyrrell. Pedro Lamy had a mid-race spin, but recovered to take sixth in his Minardi – his only Formula One point, and Minardi's last until the 1999 European Grand Prix. Only eight cars finished the race, with Pedro Diniz seventh place being Forti's best Formula One finish. The eighth place for Pacific also equalled their best result since the 1995 German Grand Prix. The race was televised by Channel 9 in Australia and by the BBC in the UK.

The race marked the end of Pacific Racing, as the team went back to International Formula 3000 for 1996. In a last gasp effort, Pacific tried to have their test driver Oliver Gavin in the seat, but he was not granted an FIA Super License and shareholder Bertrand Gachot raced instead. It was only the second time in Formula One history that the winner won by two laps– the first time was at the 1969 Spanish Grand Prix when Jackie Stewart won. Hill, who had been criticised for his performances in all of the three previous races, was praised by commentator Murray Walker for this performance, with Walker saying that, with Schumacher and Coulthard's imminent moves to Ferrari and McLaren respectively, Hill would be a strong favourite to win the title in 1996 if he could continue to perform in the way he had done so in this particular race. This would also be the last race for a V12 engine. Only Ferrari used this configuration, but would switch to a more fuel-efficient V10 engine for 1996.

== Classification ==
=== Qualifying ===
| Pos | No | Driver | Constructor | Q1 | Q2 | Gap |
|---|---|---|---|---|---|---|
| 1 | 5 | (United Kingdom) Damon Hill | Williams-Renault | 1:15.505 | 1:15.988 | – |
| 2 | 6 | (United Kingdom) David Coulthard | Williams-Renault | 1:15.628 | 1:15.792 | +0.123 |
| 3 | 1 | (Germany) Michael Schumacher | Benetton-Renault | 1:16.039 | 1:15.839 | +0.334 |
| 4 | 28 | (Austria) Gerhard Berger | Ferrari | 1:15.932 | 1:16.994 | +0.427 |
| 5 | 27 | (France) Jean Alesi | Ferrari | 1:52.653 | 1:16.305 | +0.800 |
| 6 | 30 | (Germany) Heinz-Harald Frentzen | Sauber-Ford | 1:16.837 | 1:16.647 | +1.142 |
| 7 | 14 | (Brazil) Rubens Barrichello | Jordan-Peugeot | 1:16.725 | 1:16.971 | +1.220 |
| 8 | 2 | (United Kingdom) Johnny Herbert | Benetton-Renault | 1:17.289 | 1:16.950 | +1.445 |
| 9 | 15 | (United Kingdom) Eddie Irvine | Jordan-Peugeot | 1:17.197 | 1:17.116 | +1.611 |
| 10 | 7 | (United Kingdom) Mark Blundell | McLaren-Mercedes | 1:17.348 | 1:17.721 | +1.843 |
| 11 | 25 | (United Kingdom) Martin Brundle | Ligier-Mugen-Honda | 1:17.788 | 1:17.624 | +2.119 |
| 12 | 26 | (France) Olivier Panis | Ligier-Mugen-Honda | 1:18.033 | 1:18.065 | +2.528 |
| 13 | 9 | (Italy) Gianni Morbidelli | Footwork-Hart | 1:18.814 | 1:18.391 | +2.886 |
| 14 | 4 | (Finland) Mika Salo | Tyrrell-Yamaha | 1:18.604 | 1:19.083 | +3.099 |
| 15 | 24 | (Italy) Luca Badoer | Minardi-Ford | 1:19.285 | 1:18.810 | +3.305 |
| 16 | 3 | (Japan) Ukyo Katayama | Tyrrell-Yamaha | 1:18.828 | 1:19.114 | +3.323 |
| 17 | 23 | (Portugal) Pedro Lamy | Minardi-Ford | 1:18.875 | 1:19.114 | +3.370 |
| 18 | 29 | (Austria) Karl Wendlinger | Sauber-Ford | 1:19.561 | no time | +4.056 |
| 19 | 10 | (Japan) Taki Inoue | Footwork-Hart | 1:19.764 | 1:19.677 | +4.172 |
| 20 | 22 | (Brazil) Roberto Moreno | Forti-Ford | 1:21.419 | 1:20.657 | +5.152 |
| 21 | 21 | (Brazil) Pedro Diniz | Forti-Ford | 1:22.154 | 1:20.878 | +5.373 |
| 22 | 17 | (Italy) Andrea Montermini | Pacific-Ford | 1:21.659 | 1:21.870 | +6.154 |
| 23 | 16 | (France) Bertrand Gachot | Pacific-Ford | 1:22.881 | 1:21.998 | +6.493 |
| 24 | 8 | (Finland) Mika Häkkinen | McLaren-Mercedes | 1:37.998 | | +22.483 |

=== Race ===
| Pos | No | Driver | Constructor | Laps | Time/Retired | Grid | Points |
|---|---|---|---|---|---|---|---|
| 1 | 5 | (United Kingdom) Damon Hill | Williams-Renault | 81 | 1:49:15.946 | 1 | 10 |
| 2 | 26 | (France) Olivier Panis | Ligier-Mugen-Honda | 79 | +2 Laps | 12 | 6 |
| 3 | 9 | (Italy) Gianni Morbidelli | Footwork-Hart | 79 | +2 Laps | 13 | 4 |
| 4 | 7 | (United Kingdom) Mark Blundell | McLaren-Mercedes | 79 | +2 Laps | 10 | 3 |
| 5 | 4 | (Finland) Mika Salo | Tyrrell-Yamaha | 78 | +3 Laps | 14 | 2 |
| 6 | 23 | (Portugal) Pedro Lamy | Minardi-Ford | 78 | +3 Laps | 17 | 1 |
| 7 | 21 | (Brazil) Pedro Diniz | Forti-Ford | 77 | +4 Laps | 21 | |
| 8 | 16 | (France) Bertrand Gachot | Pacific-Ford | 76 | +5 Laps | 23 | |
| Ret | 3 | (Japan) Ukyo Katayama | Tyrrell-Yamaha | 70 | Engine | 16 | |
| Ret | 2 | (United Kingdom) Johnny Herbert | Benetton-Renault | 69 | Driveshaft | 8 | |
| Ret | 15 | (United Kingdom) Eddie Irvine | Jordan-Peugeot | 62 | Engine | 9 | |
| Ret | 30 | (Germany) Heinz-Harald Frentzen | Sauber-Ford | 39 | Gearbox | 6 | |
| Ret | 28 | (Austria) Gerhard Berger | Ferrari | 34 | Engine | 4 | |
| Ret | 25 | (United Kingdom) Martin Brundle | Ligier-Mugen-Honda | 29 | Spun off | 11 | |
| Ret | 1 | (Germany) Michael Schumacher | Benetton-Renault | 25 | Collision damage | 3 | |
| Ret | 27 | (France) Jean Alesi | Ferrari | 23 | Collision damage | 5 | |
| Ret | 22 | (Brazil) Roberto Moreno | Forti-Ford | 21 | Spun off | 20 | |
| Ret | 14 | (Brazil) Rubens Barrichello | Jordan-Peugeot | 20 | Spun off | 7 | |
| Ret | 6 | (United Kingdom) David Coulthard | Williams-Renault | 19 | Accident | 2 | |
| Ret | 10 | (Japan) Taki Inoue | Footwork-Hart | 15 | Spun off | 19 | |
| Ret | 29 | (Austria) Karl Wendlinger | Sauber-Ford | 8 | Physical | 18 | |
| Ret | 17 | (Italy) Andrea Montermini | Pacific-Ford | 2 | Gearbox | 22 | |
| DNS | 24 | (Italy) Luca Badoer | Minardi-Ford | 0 | Electrical | 15 | |
| DNS | 8 | (Finland) Mika Häkkinen | McLaren-Mercedes | – | Accident during Friday Qualifying | 24 | |

== Championship standings after the race ==
Drivers' Championship standings

| Pos | Driver | Points |
|---|---|---|
| 1 | (Germany) Michael Schumacher | 102 |
| 2 | (United Kingdom) Damon Hill | 69 |
| 3 | (United Kingdom) David Coulthard | 49 |
| 4 | (United Kingdom) Johnny Herbert | 45 |
| 5 | (France) Jean Alesi | 42 |

Constructors' Championship standings

| Pos | Constructor | Points |
|---|---|---|
| 1 | (United Kingdom) Benetton-Renault | 137 |
| 2 | (United Kingdom) Williams-Renault | 112 |
| 3 | (Italy) Ferrari | 73 |
| 4 | (United Kingdom) McLaren-Mercedes | 30 |
| 5 | (France) Ligier-Mugen-Honda | 24 |

- Note: Only the top five positions are included for both sets of standings.

| Previous race: 1995 Japanese Grand Prix | FIA Formula One World Championship; 1995 season | Next race: 1996 Australian Grand Prix |
| Previous race: 1994 Australian Grand Prix | Australian Grand Prix | Next race: 1996 Australian Grand Prix |
Awards
| Preceded by 1994 Pacific Grand Prix | Formula One Promotional Trophy for Race Promoter; 1995 | Succeeded by 1996 Australian Grand Prix |
