= 1996 Portuguese Grand Prix =

Race 15 of 16 in the 1996 Formula One World Championship
← Previous race	Next race →
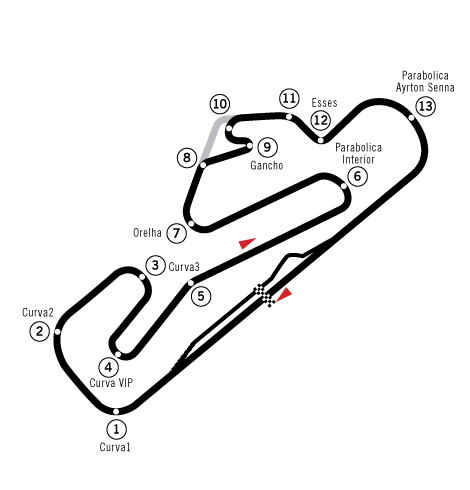

Race details
- Date: 22 September 1996
- Official name: XXV Grande Prémio de Portugal
- Location: Autódromo do Estoril in Estoril, Portugal
- Course: Permanent racing facility
- Course length: 4.360 km (2.725 miles)
- Distance: 70 laps, 305.200 km (189.630 miles)
- Weather: Mostly sunny with ambient temperatures reaching 25 °C during the day.

Pole position
Driver	(United Kingdom) Damon Hill	Williams-Renault
- Time: 1:20.330

Fastest lap
Driver	(Canada) Jacques Villeneuve	Williams-Renault
- Time: 1:22.873 on lap 37

Podium
First	(Canada) Jacques Villeneuve	Williams-Renault
Second	(United Kingdom) Damon Hill	Williams-Renault
Third	(Germany) Michael Schumacher	Ferrari

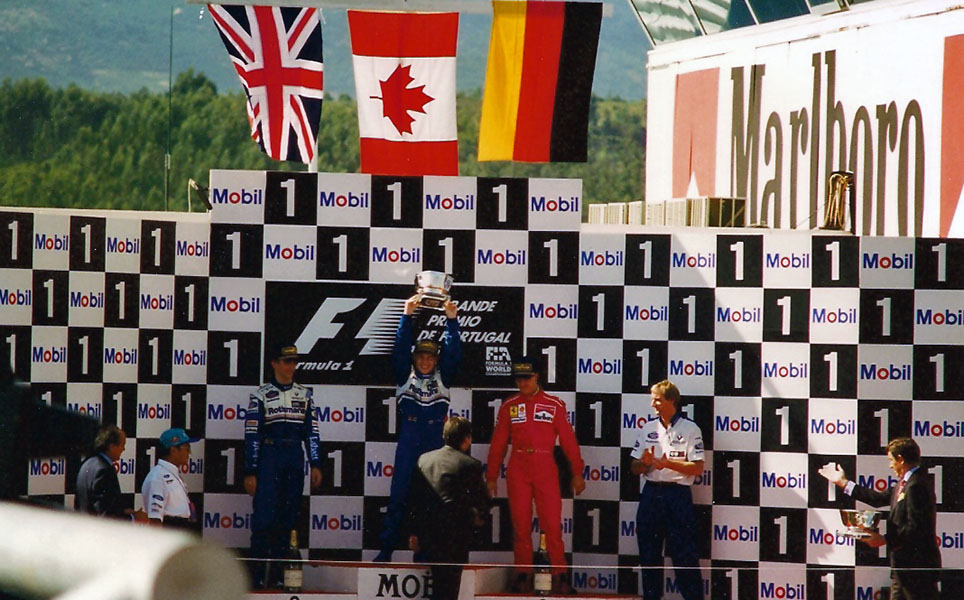
The podium ceremony.

The 1996 Portuguese Grand Prix was a Formula One motor race held on 22 September 1996 at Autódromo do Estoril in Estoril, Portugal. It was the 15th and penultimate race of the 1996 Formula One season.

Williams' Jacques Villeneuve won the race from team-mate Damon Hill and Ferrari's Michael Schumacher, having overtaken the latter on the outside of the final corner while the two were lapping the slow-moving back-marking Minardi of Giovanni Lavaggi (who at the time was described by BBC TV commentator Jonathan Palmer as "desperately slow" and "there because of his money"). This victory, Villeneuve's fourth of the season, ensured that the Drivers' Championship battle between him and Hill went to the final round in Japan three weeks later.

Benetton's Jean Alesi finished fourth, just behind Schumacher, while Eddie Irvine in the second Ferrari and Gerhard Berger in the second Benetton survived a last-lap collision to take fifth and sixth respectively.

The Portuguese Grand Prix would not be held again until 2020 but this race was held at a new venue at the Algarve International Circuit as opposed to Estoril.

== Classification ==
=== Qualifying ===
Pos	No	Driver	Constructor	Time	Diff.
1	5	(United Kingdom) Damon Hill	Williams-Renault	1:20.330	
2	6	(Canada) Jacques Villeneuve	Williams-Renault	1:20.339	+0.009
3	3	(France) Jean Alesi	Benetton-Renault	1:21.088	+0.758
4	1	(Germany) Michael Schumacher	Ferrari	1:21.236	+0.906
5	4	(Austria) Gerhard Berger	Benetton-Renault	1:21.293	+0.963
6	2	(United Kingdom) Eddie Irvine	Ferrari	1:21.362	+1.032
7	7	(Finland) Mika Häkkinen	McLaren-Mercedes	1:21.640	+1.310
8	8	(United Kingdom) David Coulthard	McLaren-Mercedes	1:22.066	+1.736
9	11	(Brazil) Rubens Barrichello	Jordan-Peugeot	1:22.205	+1.875
10	12	(United Kingdom) Martin Brundle	Jordan-Peugeot	1:22.324	+1.994
11	15	(Germany) Heinz-Harald Frentzen	Sauber-Ford	1:22.325	+1.995
12	14	(United Kingdom) Johnny Herbert	Sauber-Ford	1:22.655	+2.325
13	19	(Finland) Mika Salo	Tyrrell-Yamaha	1:22.765	+2.435
14	18	(Japan) Ukyo Katayama	Tyrrell-Yamaha	1:23.013	+2.683
15	9	(France) Olivier Panis	Ligier-Mugen-Honda	1:23.055	+2.725
16	17	(Netherlands) Jos Verstappen	Footwork-Hart	1:23.531	+3.201
17	16	(Brazil) Ricardo Rosset	Footwork-Hart	1:24.230	+3.900
18	10	(Brazil) Pedro Diniz	Ligier-Mugen-Honda	1:24.293	+3.963
19	20	(Portugal) Pedro Lamy	Minardi-Ford	1:24.510	+4.180
20	21	(Italy) Giovanni Lavaggi	Minardi-Ford	1:25.612	+5.282
107% time: 1:25.953

=== Race ===
Pos	No	Driver	Constructor	Laps	Time/Retired	Grid	Points
1	6	(Canada) Jacques Villeneuve	Williams-Renault	70	1:40:22.915	2	10
2	5	(United Kingdom) Damon Hill	Williams-Renault	70	+ 19.966	1	6
3	1	(Germany) Michael Schumacher	Ferrari	70	+ 53.765	4	4
4	3	(France) Jean Alesi	Benetton-Renault	70	+ 55.109	3	3
5	2	(United Kingdom) Eddie Irvine	Ferrari	70	+ 1:27.389	6	2
6	4	(Austria) Gerhard Berger	Benetton-Renault	70	+ 1:33.141	5	1
7	15	(Germany) Heinz-Harald Frentzen	Sauber-Ford	69	+ 1 Lap	11	
8	14	(United Kingdom) Johnny Herbert	Sauber-Ford	69	+ 1 Lap	12	
9	12	(United Kingdom) Martin Brundle	Jordan-Peugeot	69	+ 1 Lap	10	
10	9	(France) Olivier Panis	Ligier-Mugen-Honda	69	+ 1 Lap	15	
11	19	(Finland) Mika Salo	Tyrrell-Yamaha	69	+ 1 Lap	13	
12	18	(Japan) Ukyo Katayama	Tyrrell-Yamaha	68	+ 2 Laps	14	
13	8	(United Kingdom) David Coulthard	McLaren-Mercedes	68	+ 2 Laps	8	
14	16	(Brazil) Ricardo Rosset	Footwork-Hart	67	+ 3 Laps	17	
15	21	(Italy) Giovanni Lavaggi	Minardi-Ford	65	+ 5 Laps	20	
16	20	(Portugal) Pedro Lamy	Minardi-Ford	65	+ 5 Laps	19	
Ret	7	(Finland) Mika Häkkinen	McLaren-Mercedes	52	Collision damage	7	
Ret	17	(Netherlands) Jos Verstappen	Footwork-Hart	47	Engine	16	
Ret	10	(Brazil) Pedro Diniz	Ligier-Mugen-Honda	46	Collision	18	
Ret	11	(Brazil) Rubens Barrichello	Jordan-Peugeot	41	Spun Off	9	

== Championship standings after the race ==
- **Bold text** indicates who still has a theoretical chance of becoming World Champion.

Drivers' Championship standings

Pos	Driver	Points
1	(United Kingdom) **Damon Hill***	87
2	(Canada) **Jacques Villeneuve***	78
3	(Germany) Michael Schumacher	53
4	(France) Jean Alesi	47
5	(Finland) Mika Häkkinen	27

Constructors' Championship standings

Pos	Constructor	Points
1	(United Kingdom) **Williams-Renault**	165
2	(Italy) Benetton-Renault	65
3	(Italy) Ferrari	64
4	(United Kingdom) McLaren-Mercedes	45
5	(Republic of Ireland) Jordan-Peugeot	20

- Note: Only the top five positions are included for both sets of standings.

Previous race: 1996 Italian Grand Prix	FIA Formula One World Championship; 1996 season	Next race: 1996 Japanese Grand Prix
Previous race: 1995 Portuguese Grand Prix	Portuguese Grand Prix	Next race: 2020 Portuguese Grand Prix
