= Mount Cotton Hillclimb =

Permanent tarmac hillclimbing circuit at Mount Cotton, Queensland, Australia

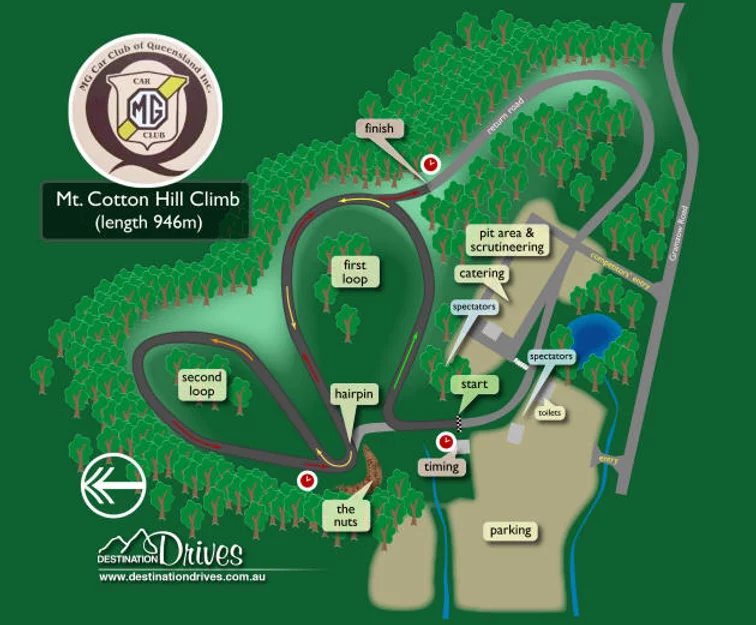
- Location: Mount Cotton, Queensland
- Coordinates: 27°38′49″S 153°13′54″E
- Owner: MG Car Club of Queensland
- Operator: MG Car Club of Queensland
- Opened: 1968
- Major events: Australian Hillclimb Championship; Queensland Hillclimb Championships; Mt. Cotton Hillclimb Series; Qld Interclub Challenge; Motorsport Australia Club Challenge

Circuit
- Length: 0.946 km (0.588 mi)
- Turns: 8

Open Record
- Race lap record: 35.25 (Malcolm Oastler, OMS 28-Suzuki, 2017)

Closed Record
- Race lap record: 36.14 (Dean Amos, Gould GR55B-Cosworth, 2021)

Mount Cotton Hillclimb is a permanent tarmac hillclimbing circuit at Mount Cotton, Queensland, Australia. It is owned and run by the MG Car Club of Queensland. Club events are run at intervals of around 4–6 weeks. The Queensland Hillclimb Championship is run there every year, and the Australian Hillclimb Championship is run there every 7 years.
