= BAR 01 =

Formula One racing car

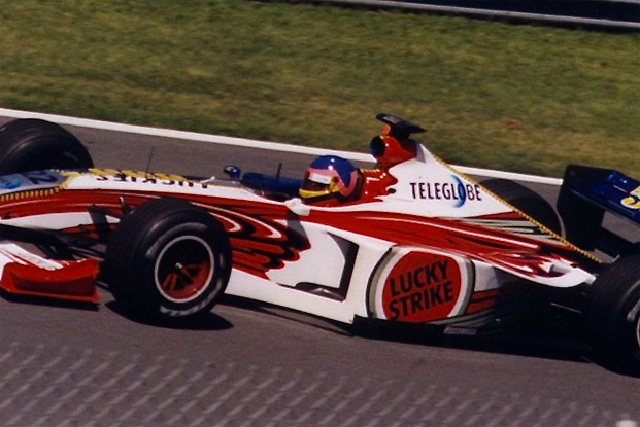
- Jacques Villeneuve driving the BAR 01 at the 1999 Canadian Grand Prix.
- Category: Formula One
- Constructor: British American Racing
- Designers: Adrian Reynard (Executive Engineer); Malcolm Oastler (Technical Director); Paul Crooks (Head of Design - Composites); Andrew Green (Head of Design - Mechanical); Simon Lacey (Senior Aerodynamicist)
- Predecessor: Tyrrell 026
- Successor: 002

Technical specifications
- Chassis: Moulded carbon fibre composite structure
- Suspension (front): Double wishbones, pushrod with coaxial spring/damper, and torsion bar
- Suspension (rear): Double wishbones, pushrod
- Engine: Supertec FB01 (badged Renault RS9), 3.0-litre V10 (71°), mid-engined
- Transmission: BAR/Xtrac six-speed longitudinal sequential semi-automatic
- Power: 780 hp @ 15,800 rpm
- Fuel: Elf
- Tyres: Bridgestone

Competition history
- Notable entrants: British American Racing
- Notable drivers: 22. (Canada) Jacques Villeneuve; 23. (Brazil) Ricardo Zonta; 23. (Finland) Mika Salo
- Debut: 1999 Australian Grand Prix
- Last event: 1999 Japanese Grand Prix
Races	Wins	Poles	F/Laps
16	0	0	0
- Constructors' Championships: 0
- Drivers' Championships: 0

The BAR 01 (also known as BAR PR01) was the car with which the British American Racing Formula One team competed in the 1999 Formula One season, its inaugural year in the series after purchasing Tyrrell. It was driven by Jacques Villeneuve, the 1997 Champion who had left Williams in order to work with team principal Craig Pollock, his manager and good friend. The second driver was Ricardo Zonta, the 1997 Formula 3000 champion and 1998 FIA GT champion, although Mika Salo would deputise early in the season after the Brazilian injured his ankle at Interlagos.

Despite the driving pedigree of Villeneuve and Zonta, and the technical experience of Reynard Motorsports, the year was a disaster and a major disappointment for the team, especially after Adrian Reynard aimed to secure the pole position and race victory in its first race. The cars were usually quite competitive and looked like points-scoring contenders on several occasions (Villeneuve, at one point, had briefly run third during the Spanish Grand Prix), but reliability was terrible, with Villeneuve alone failing to finish the first eleven races of the season. The end result was last in the Constructors' Championship with no points, behind much smaller budgeted teams such as Minardi, Arrows and Sauber.

As of 2026, the BAR 01 remains the last-ever Brackley-based Formula One car that failed to score any World Championship points.

== Sponsorship and livery ==
Before the 1999 season had even started, BAR ran into trouble with the FIA. BAR had desired to run a different livery on each car, as their showcars did. Villeneuve's car was to display Lucky Strike branding, and Zonta's car to have 555 branding. Both of these are cigarette brands owned by the team's parent company, British American Tobacco. The FIA's regulations state that both cars are required to have identical liveries, with only minor differences such as the car number and driver's nationality flag and name.

A quick-fix design was created, resulting in a dual livery design with the Lucky Strike branding covering the left side of the car and the 555 branding on the right side. The car's livery then had a "zip" up the centre, which spread wide at the end of the nosecone to allow other sponsors not to be affected by the dual colour design. Minor team sponsors and other adverts on the car were on a silver background. The rear wing was also compromised to stop the dual sectioning affecting the small space: 555 covered the side facing forwards and Lucky Strike was on the side facing backwards. This livery design was passed by the FIA.

The livery itself was only used for the 1999 season, as BAR went on to almost exclusively use the Lucky Strike branding. All mechanics' suits were also half Lucky Strike and half 555, apart from the drivers who had different suits and helmets. Villeneuve had the Lucky Strike branding on his suit and helmet, while Zonta and Salo had the 555 branding on theirs. For races where tobacco advertising was not allowed, 555 was replaced by triple crescent moon (as previously done with Subaru Impreza rally cars), while Lucky Strike was blocked out on the sides and replaced with "Run Free" on the car's nose and wings. This livery modification was used for the French, British and Belgian Grands Prix.

== Assessment ==
In a retrospective article, Jake Boxall-Legge of Autosport called the 01 one of the best Formula One cars to never score a point, alongside the ATS D6.

== Complete Formula One results ==
(key) (results in bold indicate pole position)

Year	Team	Engine	Tyres	Drivers	Grands Prix																Points	WCC
Year	Team	Engine	Tyres	Drivers	AUS	BRA	SMR	MON	ESP	CAN	FRA	GBR	AUT	GER	HUN	BEL	ITA	EUR	MAL	JPN	Points	WCC
1999	BAR	Supertec V10	**B**	(Canada) Jacques Villeneuve	Ret	Ret	Ret	Ret	Ret	Ret	Ret	Ret	Ret	Ret	Ret	15	8	10^{†}	Ret	9	0	NC
1999	BAR	Supertec V10	**B**	(Brazil) Ricardo Zonta	Ret	DNQ				Ret	9	Ret	15^{†}	Ret	13	Ret	Ret	8	Ret	12	0	NC
1999	BAR	Supertec V10	**B**	(Finland) Mika Salo			7^{†}	Ret	8												0	NC
