= Oastler =

Oastler is a surname. Notable people with the surname include:

- Joe Oastler (born 1990), English footballer
- Malcolm Oastler (born 1959), Australian Formula One designer and director
- Richard Oastler (1789–1861), English labour reformer and abolitionist
