= Australian Hillclimb Championship =

The Australian Hillclimb Championship is an Australian motor sport competition which determines Australia's annual hillclimbing champion. The championship has traditionally been awarded to the driver setting fastest time at a single meeting however the 1958 title was awarded based on the combined results of two meetings and a multi round pointscore series was employed from 1972 to 1975.

The championship has been sanctioned by Motorsport Australia (formerly known as the Confederation of Australian Motor Sport) since 1954. Prior to this it was sanctioned by the Australian Automobile Association, with two events having national championship status in 1949.

The term Motorsport Australia Hill Climb Championship has been used by Motorsport Australia for the title since 2020.

In 2022, history was made when Dean Tighe won the championship, 58 years after his father Ivan, making them the first father and son duo to both win the championship.

== Results ==
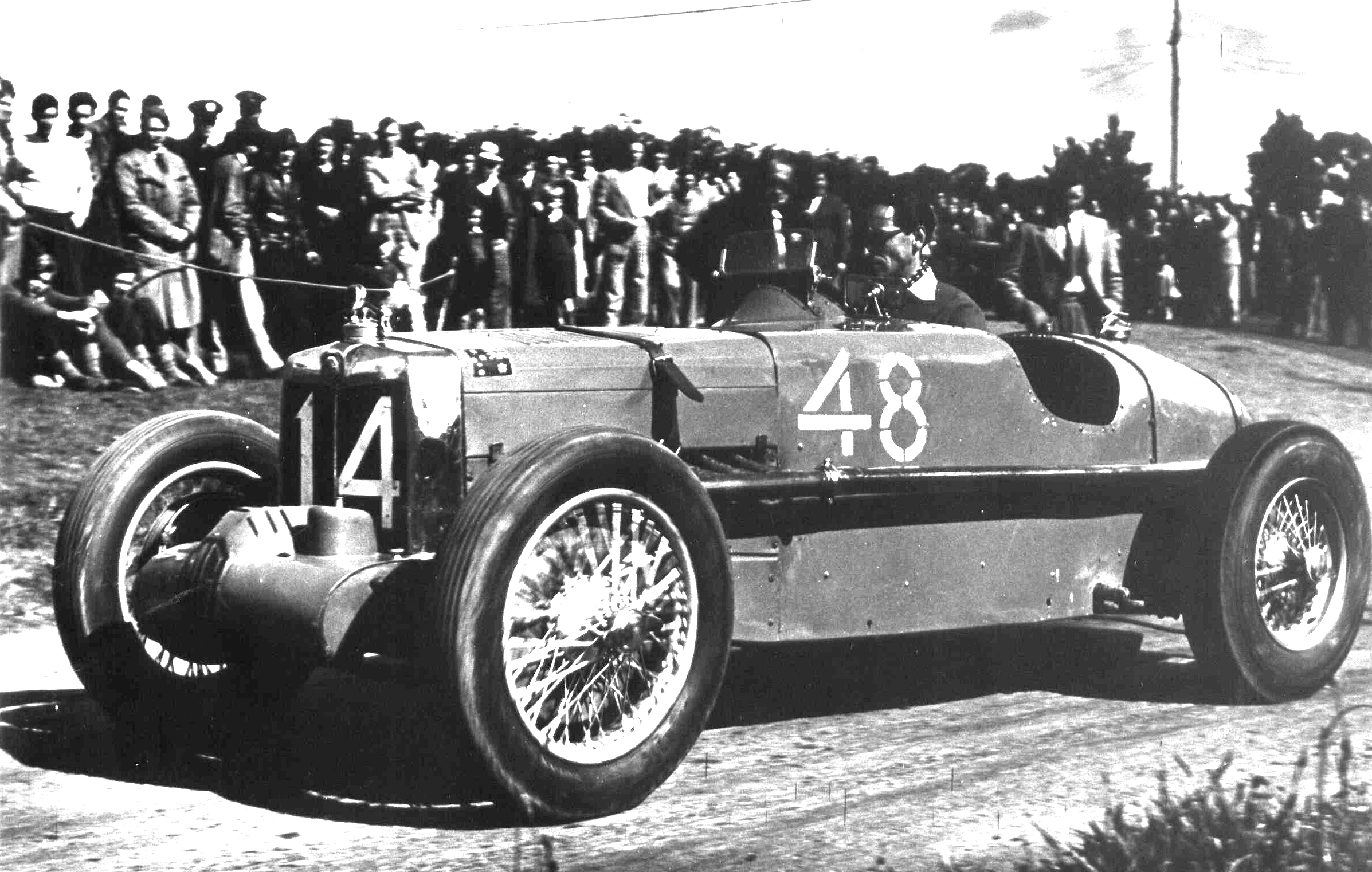
John Barraclough won the 1949 title at Rob Roy driving an MG K3 Magnette

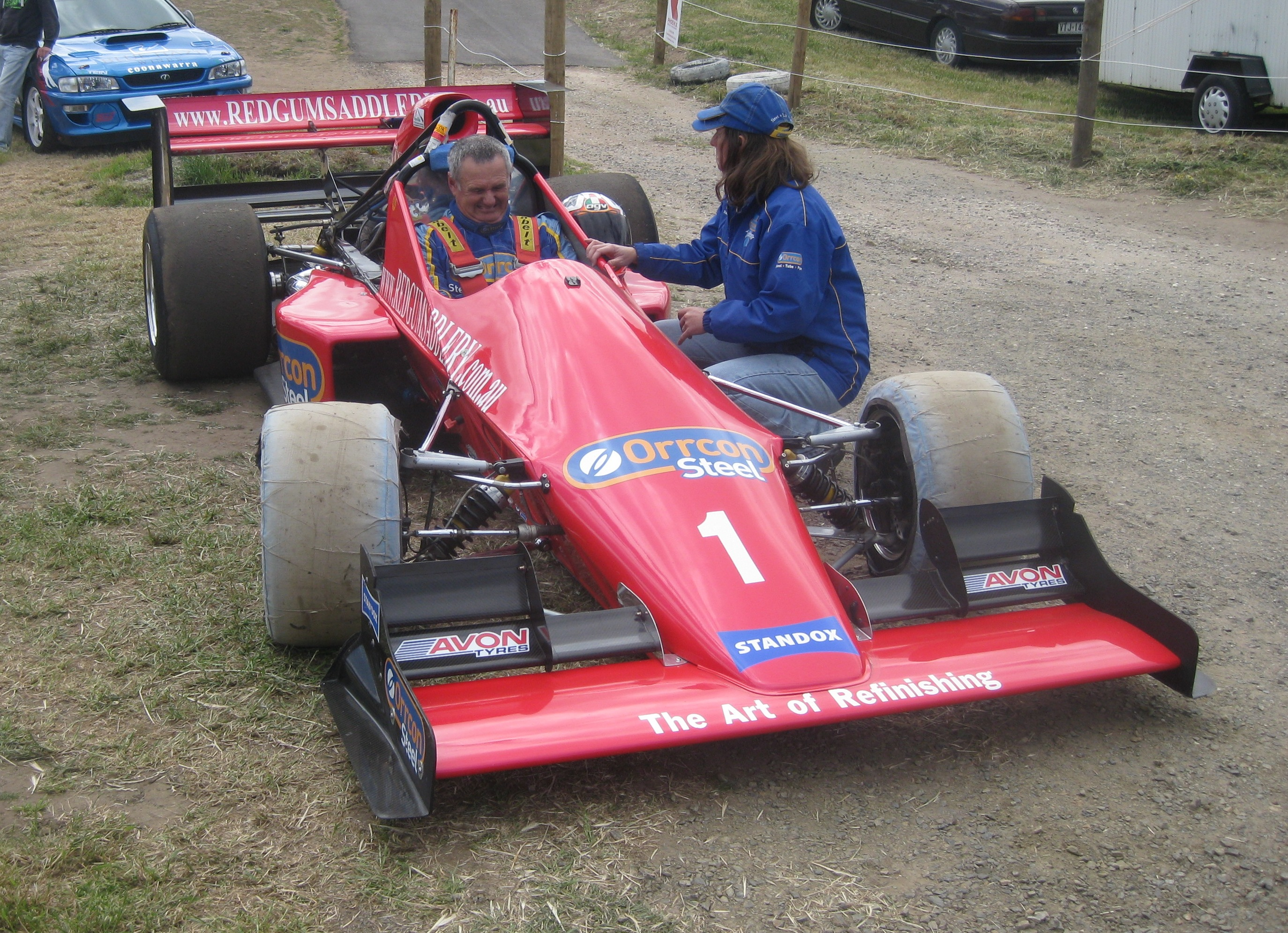
Peter Gumley has won ten Australian Hillclimb Championship titles. He is pictured in his SCV Volkswagen at Collingrove Hillclimb in 2011

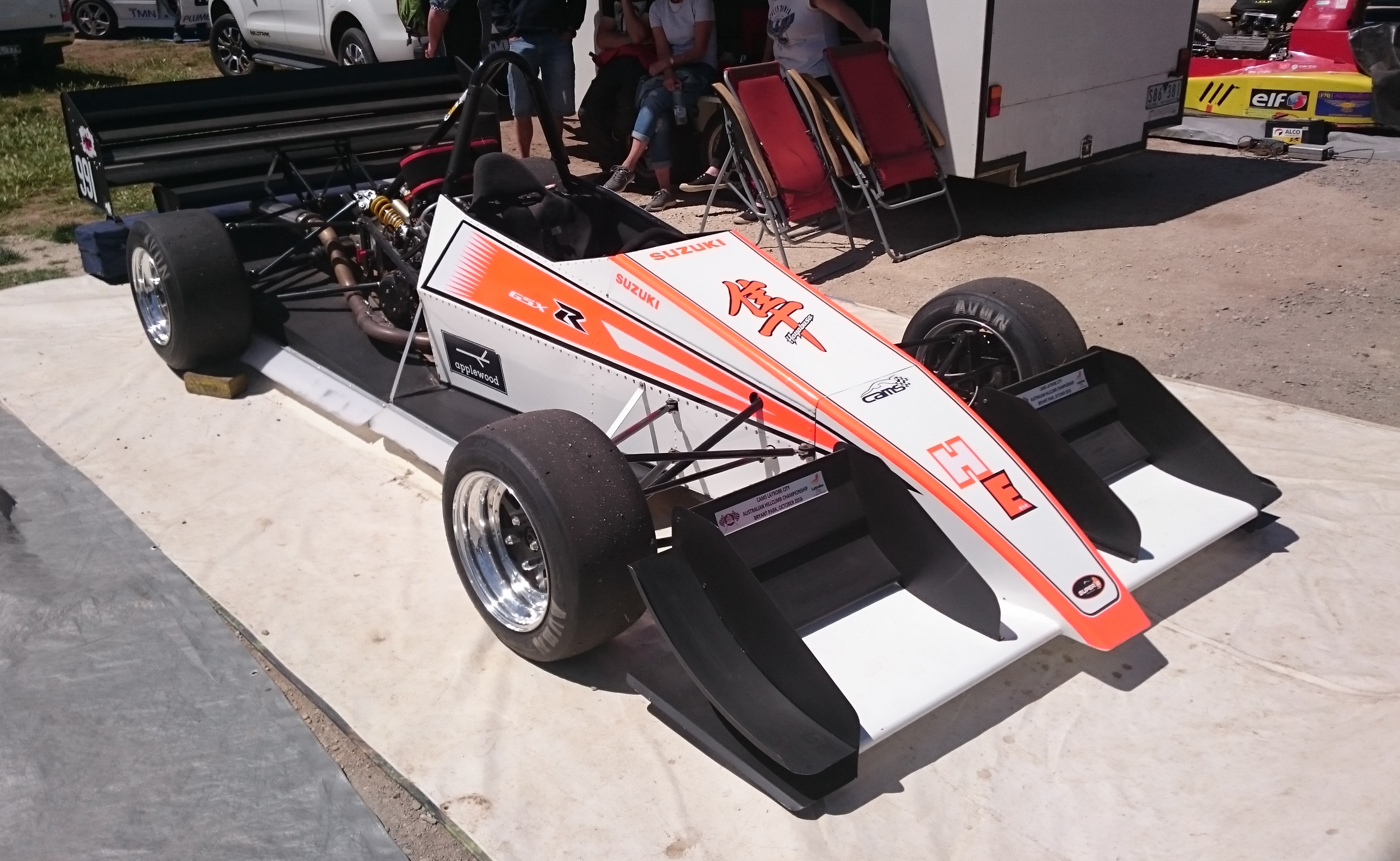
Brett Hayward won his third title in 2017, driving this Hayward. The car is pictured at the 2017 Championship at Collingrove Hillclimb

Year	Venue	State	Date	Champion	Car
1938	Rob Roy	Vic.	13 June	Peter Whitehead	ERA R10B
1947	Rob Roy	Vic.	2 November	Arthur Wylie	Ford A Special
1948	Rob Roy	Vic.	2 November	Frank Kleinig	Hudson Special
1949	Hawkesbury	NSW	20 March	Frank Kleinig	Hudson Special
1949	Rob Roy	Vic.	1 November	John Barraclough	MG K3 Magnette
1950	Rob Roy	Vic.	7 November	Keith Martin	Cooper JAP 1000
1951	Rob Roy	Vic.	6 November	Jack Brabham	Twin Special Speedcar
1952	Rob Roy	Vic.	4 November	John Crouch	Cooper 1100
1953	Rob Roy	Vic.	2 November	Reg Hunt	Hunt Vincent 1000 Special
1954	Collingrove	SA	19 April	Bill Patterson	Cooper Mk. V JAP 1000
1955	Toowoomba	Qld.	17 September	Lex Davison	Cooper Mk. IV Vincent
1956	Bathurst	NSW	21 October	Lex Davison	Cooper Mk. IV Vincent
1957	Albany	WA	20 April	Lex Davison	Cooper Mk. IV Irving
1958	Templestowe & Rob Roy	Vic.	2 November & 4 November	Bruce Walton	Walton Cooper
1959	Queens Domain, Hobart	Tas.	14 November	Bruce Walton	Walton Cooper
1960	Collingrove	SA	17 October	Bruce Walton	Walton Cooper
1961	Toowoomba	Qld.	24 September	Bruce Walton	Walton Cooper
1962	Silverdale	NSW	22 July	Bruce Walton	Walton Cooper
1963	Silverdale	NSW	21 July	Bruce Walton	Walton Cooper
1964	Silverdale	NSW	19 July	Ivan Tighe	Tighe Vincent
1965	Lakeland	Vic.	28 March	Tim Schenken	White 500
1966	Collingrove	SA	8 October	Alan Hamilton	Porsche 904 Bergspyder
1967	Bathurst	NSW	26 November	Greg Cusack	Repco Brabham BT23A
1968	Templestowe	Vic.	17 November	Dick White	White 1500
1969	Silverdale	NSW	21 & 22 June	Dick White	White 2000 Volkswagen s/c
1970	Mount Cotton	Qld.	14 June	Paul England	Ausca Volkswagen
1971	Collingrove	SA	10 April	Alan Hamilton	Porsche 906
1972	Three round series	N/A	N/A	Murray Bingham	Bingham Cobra
1973	Four round series	N/A	N/A	Paul England	Ausca Volkswagen
1974	Four round series	N/A	N/A	Paul England	Ausca Volkswagen
1975	Four round series	N/A	N/A	Stan Keen	Elfin MR5 Ford
1976	Bathurst	NSW	7 November	Peter Hollinger	Holinger Repco
1977	Morwell	Vic.	27 November	Ian Judd	Cheetah Oldsmobile
1978	Collingrove	SA	8 October	Peter Holinger	Holinger Repco
1979	Mount Cotton	Qld.	10 June	Peter Holinger	Holinger Repco
1980	Silverdale	NSW	8–9 November	Kym Rohrlach	Volkswagen Special
1981	Ararat	Vic.	15 November	Alan Hamilton	Porsche Special
1982	Collingrove	SA	9–10 October	Kym Rohrlach	Volkswagen Special
1983	Mount Cotton	Qld.	5 June	Roger Harrison	Elfin 600C Repco Brabham
1984	Huntley Hill, Dapto	NSW	28 October	Warren Brown	Sceptre V8
1985	Mount Leura	Vic.	20 October	Ivan Tighe	Chevron B37 Chevrolet
1986	Collingrove	SA	12 October	Kym Rohrlach	Volkswagen Special
1987	Mount Cotton	Qld.	31 May	Kym Rohrlach	Volkswagen Special
1988	Fairbairn Park	ACT	8 May	Peter Holinger	Holinger Repco
1989	Gippsland Park	Vic.	15 October	Alan Hamilton	Lola T8750 Buick
1990	Collingrove	SA	16 September	Garry McFadyen	Bowin
1991	Mount Cotton	Qld.	2 June	Ivan Tighe	Kaditcha
1992	Mountain View, Grafton	NSW	13 September	John Davies	DBF Suzuki
1993	One Tree Hill, Ararat	Vic.	19–21 November	Stan Keen	Shrike
1994	Collingrove	SA	15 & 16 October	Roger Harrison	Tiga FA83 Repco Brabham
1995	Mount Cotton	Qld.	3–4 June	John Davies	DBF Suzuki
1996	Bathurst	NSW	4–7 April	Peter Gumley	SCV
1997	Mount Leura, Camperdown	Vic.	16–19 October	Roger Harrison	Tiga FA83 Repco Brabham
1998	Collingrove	SA	20 September	Peter Gumley	SCV
1999	Gippsland Park, Morwell	Vic.	29–31 October	Peter Gumley	SCV
2000	Mount Panorama, Bathurst	NSW	29 September – 1 October	Peter Gumley	SCV
2001	Mount Cotton	Qld.	28–30 September	Peter Gumley	SCV
2002	Grafton	NSW	14–15 September	Peter Gumley	SCV
2003	Collingrove	SA	18,19&21 April	Peter Gumley	SCV
2004	Gippsland Park, Morwell,	Vic.	29–31 October	Gary West	Lola F3000
2005	Collingrove	SA	2 October	Peter Gumley	SCV Volkswagen
2006	Bathurst	NSW	3–5 November	Gary West	Lola F3000
2007	Mount Cotton	Qld.	3–4 November	Peter Gumley	Wortmeyer SCV
2008	Mount Panorama, Bathurst	NSW	7–9 October	Gary West	Lola T8750
2009	Bryant Park	Vic.	29 October – 1 November	Brett Hayward	Hayward 09
2010	Collingrove	SA	15–17 October	Peter Gumley	Wortmeyer SCV Volkswagen
2011	Bryant Park, Yallourn	Vic.	30 October	Brett Hayward	Hayward 09
2012	Mount Panorama Circuit, Bathurst	NSW	3 & 4 November	Tim Edmondson	Gould GR55B Nicholson McLaren
2013	Mount Cotton	Qld	1–3 November	Greg Ackland	Ackland GA8
2014	Ringwood Park Motorsport Complex	NSW	1–2 November	Malcolm Oastler	OMS 28
2015	Jacks Hill	WA	6–8 November	Malcolm Oastler	OMS 28
2016	Bryant Park, Yallourn	Vic.	27–30 October	Malcolm Oastler	OMS 28
2017	Collingrove	SA	28–29 October	Brett Hayward	Hayward
2018	Bryant Park, Yallourn	Vic.	26–28 October	Malcolm Oastler	OMS 28
2019	Mount Panorama Circuit, Bathurst	NSW	1–3 November	Malcolm Oastler	OMS 28
2020	Mount Cotton	Qld.	5–8 November	Cancelled due to Covid-19 restrictions	
2021	Mount Cotton	Qld.	25–28 November	Cancelled due to Covid-19 restrictions	
2022	Mount Cotton	Qld.	22–23 October	Dean Tighe	Empire Wraith
2023	Ringwood Park Motorsport Complex	NSW	27–29 October	Dean Amos	Gould GR55B Nicholson McLaren V8
2024	Bryant Park, Yallourn	Vic.	24–27 October	Dean Amos	Gould GR55B Nicholson McLaren V8
2025	East Circuit, Shell V-Power Motorsport Park	SA	10–12 October	Dean Amos	Gould GR55B Nicholson McLaren Cosworth
2026	Jack's Hill	WA			
