= BAR 002 =

Formula One racing car

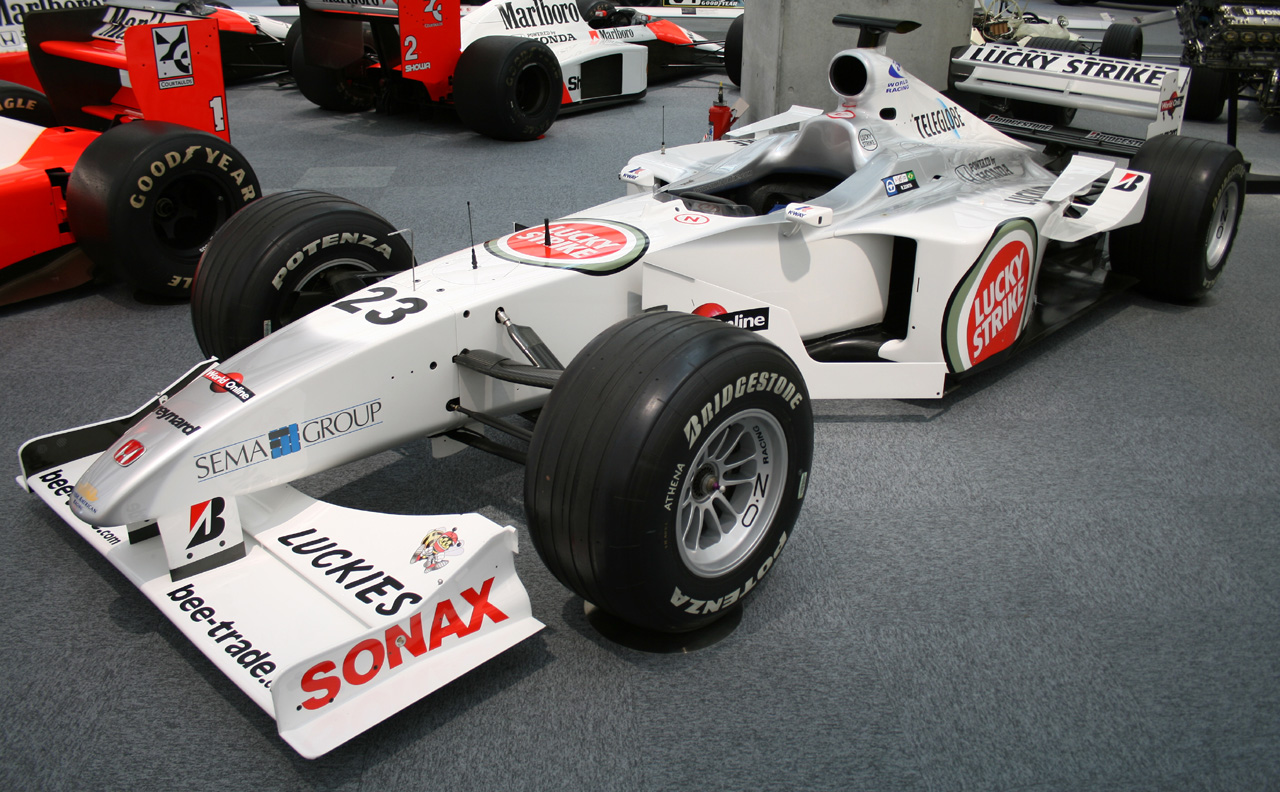
- The BAR 002 of Ricardo Zonta on display at Honda Collection Hall
- Category: Formula One
- Constructor: British American Racing
- Designers: Adrian Reynard (Executive Engineer); Malcolm Oastler (Technical Director); Paul Crooks (Head of Design - Composites); Andrew Green (Head of Design - Mechanical); Willem Toet (Senior Aerodynamicist); Simon Lacey (Senior Aerodynamicist)
- Predecessor: 01
- Successor: 003

Technical specifications
- Chassis: Moulded carbon fibre composite structure
- Suspension (front): Double wishbones, pushrod/torsion springs/rockers, mechanical anti-roll bar
- Suspension (rear): Double wishbones, pushrod/torsion springs/rockers, mechanical anti-roll bar
- Engine: Honda RA000E 2,994 cc (182.7 cu in), 80-degree V10
- Transmission: BAR six-speed longitudinal semi-automatic, sequential
- Power: 810 hp @ 17,000 rpm
- Fuel: ?
- Lubricants: ? (Rd. 1–2), Nisseki Mitsubishi (Rd. 3–17)
- Tyres: Bridgestone

Competition history
- Notable entrants: Lucky Strike Reynard BAR Honda
- Notable drivers: 22. (Canada) Jacques Villeneuve; 23. (Brazil) Ricardo Zonta
- Debut: 2000 Australian Grand Prix
- Last event: 2000 Malaysian Grand Prix
Races	Wins	Poles	F/Laps
17	0	0	0
- Constructors' Championships: 0
- Drivers' Championships: 0

The BAR 002 was the car with which the British American Racing Formula One team competed in the 2000 Formula One season. It was driven by the 1997 World Champion Jacques Villeneuve, and Brazilian Ricardo Zonta, both drivers in their second year with the team.

== Design ==
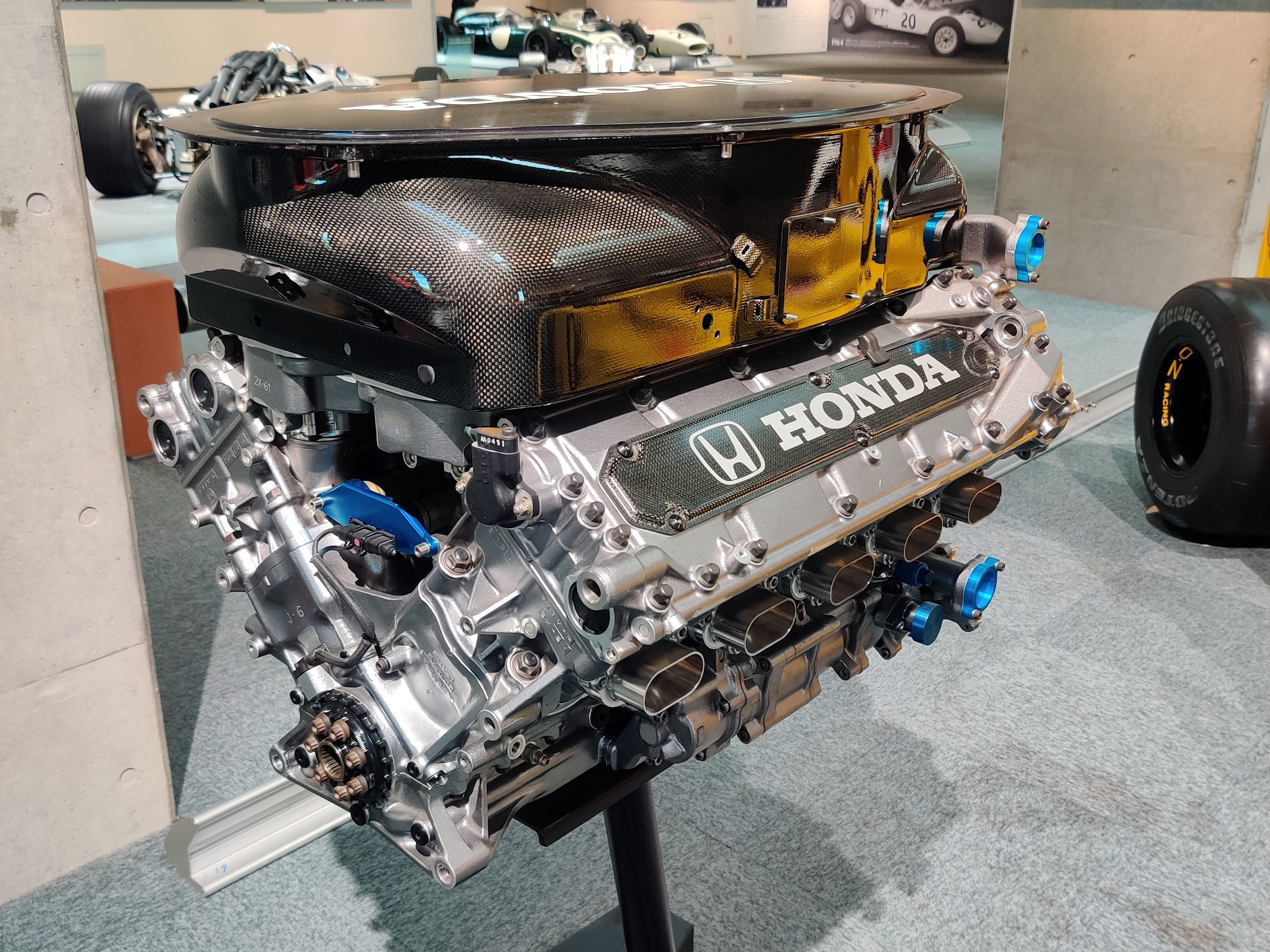
Honda RA000E 3.0L V10 engine

The BAR 002 was the inaugural season of a Honda factory engine supply, a partnership which would eventually lead to the team being bought out by the Japanese company for the 2006 season. The car had its first shakedown with the new engine at Silverstone Circuit in December 1999, where Jacques Villeneuve completed 34 laps. Due to a focus on the reliability of the car for 2000, visually the car looked very similar to the BAR 01 of the previous season.

The BAR 002 was launched at the Queen Elizabeth II Centre in London, on 24 January, 2000. Alongside full time drivers Villeneuve and Zonta, Darren Manning was signed as test driver and Patrick Lemarié continued as a development driver for the season.

== Season overview ==
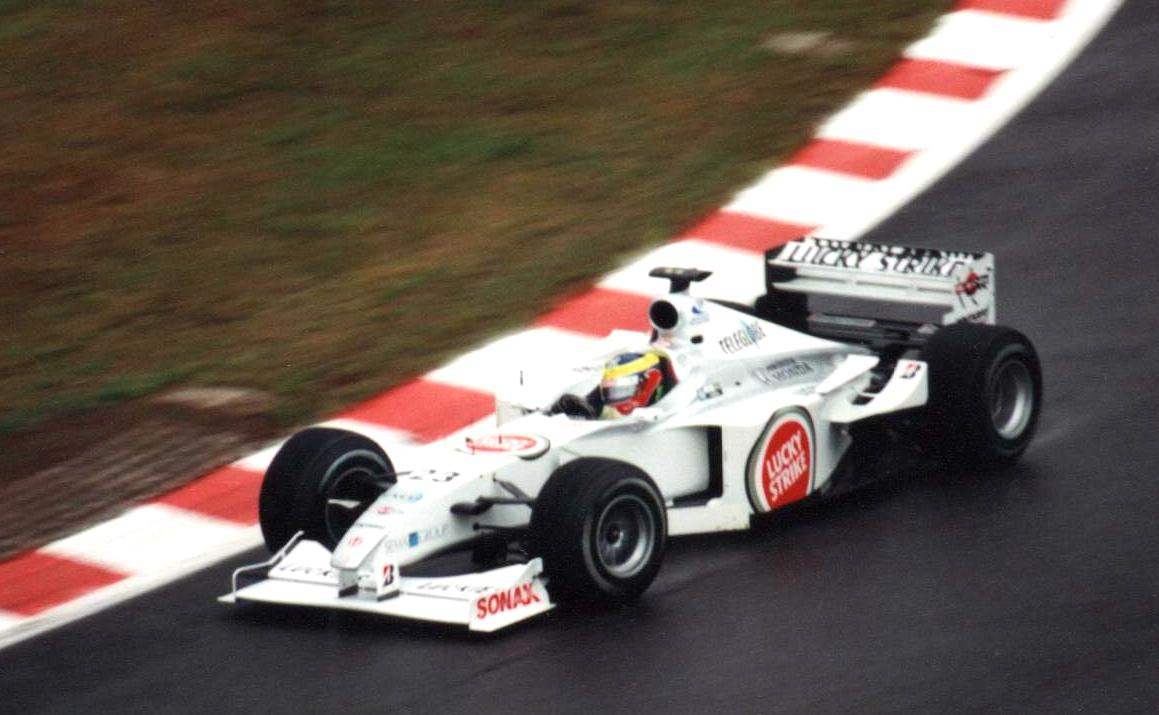
Ricardo Zonta at the 2000 Belgian Grand Prix

Following the failure of the 1999 season where BAR scored no points; both Villeneuve and Zonta scored points in the first race at Australia. Fourth place would be the cars best finish of the season, Villeneuve achieving this across a further three Grand Prix in France, Austria and the United States of America. Zonta scored points at a total of three Grand Prix in 2000.

During the season in August, it was announced Ricardo Zonta would be replaced by Olivier Panis for the 2001 season. Zonta later criticised the atmosphere in the team in 2000.

The team finished fifth in the Constructors' Championship, with 20 points. This tally was equal to the Benetton team, but Giancarlo Fisichella's podium finishes ensured that the Anglo-Italian team stayed ahead.

In 2012, chassis 020-05, which scored points in the hands of Zonta at the Italian Grand Prix, was offered for sale at auction in Monaco. It had been acquired by Brawn GP when purchasing the assets of the former Honda F1 Team.

== Sponsorship and livery ==
This was the first time the BAR had been seen in Lucky Strike livery, stepping away from the split of the 555 branding season prior.

BAR used the Lucky Strike logos, except at the British, French Grands Prix where Lucky Strike was blocked out on the sides and on the car's nose and wings.

== Complete Formula One results ==
(key)

Year	Team	Engine	Tyres	Drivers	1	2	3	4	5	6	7	8	9	10	11	12	13	14	15	16	17	Points	WCC
2000	BAR	Honda RA000E V10	B		AUS	BRA	SMR	GBR	ESP	EUR	MON	CAN	FRA	AUT	GER	HUN	BEL	ITA	USA	JPN	MAL	20	5th
2000	BAR	Honda RA000E V10	B	(Canada) Jacques Villeneuve	4	Ret	5	16	Ret	Ret	7	15	4	4	8	12	7	Ret	4	6	5	20	5th
2000	BAR	Honda RA000E V10	B	(Brazil) Ricardo Zonta	6	9	12	Ret	8	Ret	Ret	8	Ret	Ret	Ret	14	12	6	6	9	Ret	20	5th
