= Knockhill =

Race track in Fife, Scotland

Knockhill Racing Circuit
Home of Scottish Motor Racing

- All circuit layouts from 2018
- Location: Fife, Scotland
- Coordinates: 56°7′43.90″N 3°30′12.68″W
- FIA Grade: 4
- Opened: September 1974; 51 years ago
- Major events: Current: BTCC (1992–2002, 2004–present); BSB (1996–2019, 2021–present); Former: British GT (2001–2003, 2005, 2008–2010); TCR UK (2018, 2023); British F3 (2001–2005)
- Website: https://www.knockhill.com/

Clockwise International Circuit (1974–present)
- Length: 2.0389 km (1.2669 mi)
- Turns: 9
- Race lap record: 0:41.880 ( (United Kingdom) Heather Calder, Gould GR55, 2018, British Sprint Championship)

Anti-clockwise International Circuit (1974–present)
- Length: 2.0389 km (1.2669 mi)
- Turns: 9
- Race lap record: 0:42.940 ( (United Kingdom) Heather Calder, Gould GR55, 2018, British Sprint Championship)

National Circuit (1974–present)
- Length: 1.609 km (1.000 mi)
- Turns: 10

Tri-Oval Circuit (1974–present)
- Length: 0.482 km (0.300 mi)
- Turns: 3

Knockhill Racing Circuit is a motor racing circuit in Fife, Scotland. It opened in September 1974 and is Scotland's national motorsport centre. The circuit is in the countryside about 6-mile (9.7 km) north of Dunfermline. It is the only FIA-approved circuit in Scotland.

== History ==
The circuit opened in September 1974. It was created by joining service roads to a nearby disused mineral railway, closed in 1951, which had served Lethans Colliery. The first car race was held on 18 May 1975.

Between 1974 and 1983 the circuit had several owners, who helped to steadily develop the circuit's facilities and attractions. Derek Butcher became the owner in 1984 and since then Knockhill has been developed to a point where it is able to host rounds of most of the major British car and motorbike championships. The circuit hosted a round of the British Touring Car Championships for twelve years until the deal ended in 2002 with the promoters seeking infrastructure upgrades. Knockhill made improvements and the touring car series returned to Knockhill in 2004 with ITV televising the event live. The British Formula Three Championship and British GT Championship returned to Knockhill in May 2005.

In 2008 Knockhill named a corner Leslie's Bend in honour of the racing-car driver David Leslie shortly after his death in a small jet-aircraft accident at Farnborough.

In 2012 the circuit restarted racing and track days in the anti-clockwise direction. It gained a licence for motorbikes and cars to compete in both directions, the first racing circuit to achieve that in the UK in modern times. As of 2025 the circuit has an FIA grade 3 licence, the only circuit in Scotland issued with a licence by the FIA at this time.

== The circuit ==
The circuit has three layouts, the 1.300 mi (2.092 km) International layout with 9 corners, the 1.000 mi (1.609 km) National layout with 10 corners and the 0.300 mi (0.483 km) tri-oval. On all layouts the circuit is 10 m (33 ft) wide and has a total elevation change of 37 m (121 ft).

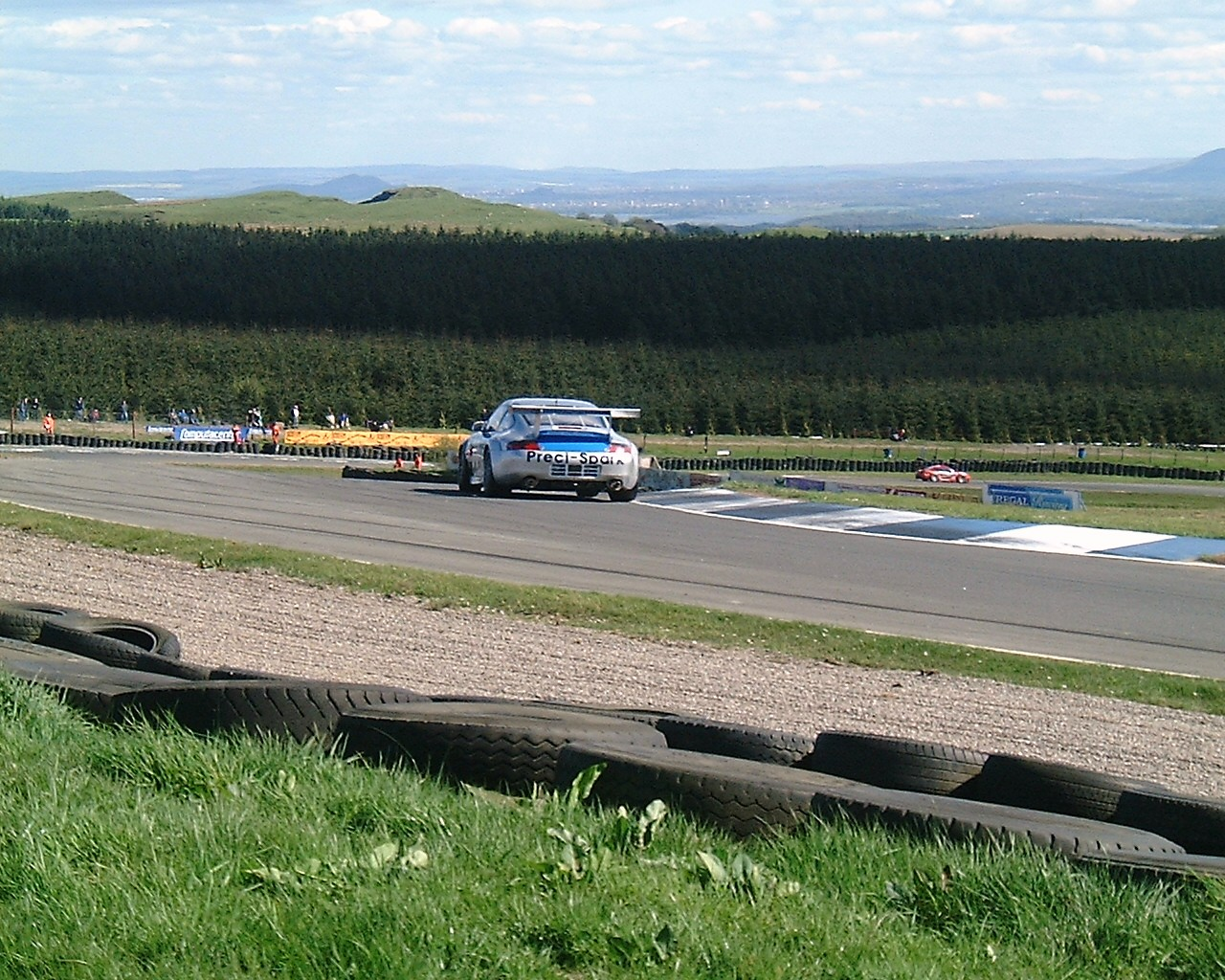
A Porsche at the top of Duffus Dip

A lap of Knockhill, beginning at the start line (which unusually for a motor-racing circuit is at a different point from the finish line. Whilst the start line is roughly in the middle of the pit straight, the finish line is slightly to the west, towards the final corner), first involves passing over the crest, which marks the highest point of the circuit. The circuit then levels out and passes under the pedestrian bridge before a short braking zone preceding the first of the nine corners, Duffus Dip, a fast, blind apexed downhill right-hand corner widely regarded as one of the most challenging corners in the United Kingdom. At the foot of this decline is a quick left-hand corner named Leslie's, followed swiftly by a tricky braking zone, owing to vehicles possibly still being unsettled from the levelling out of the track through Leslie's, for the next corner, a ninety-degree right-hand bend named McIntyre's.

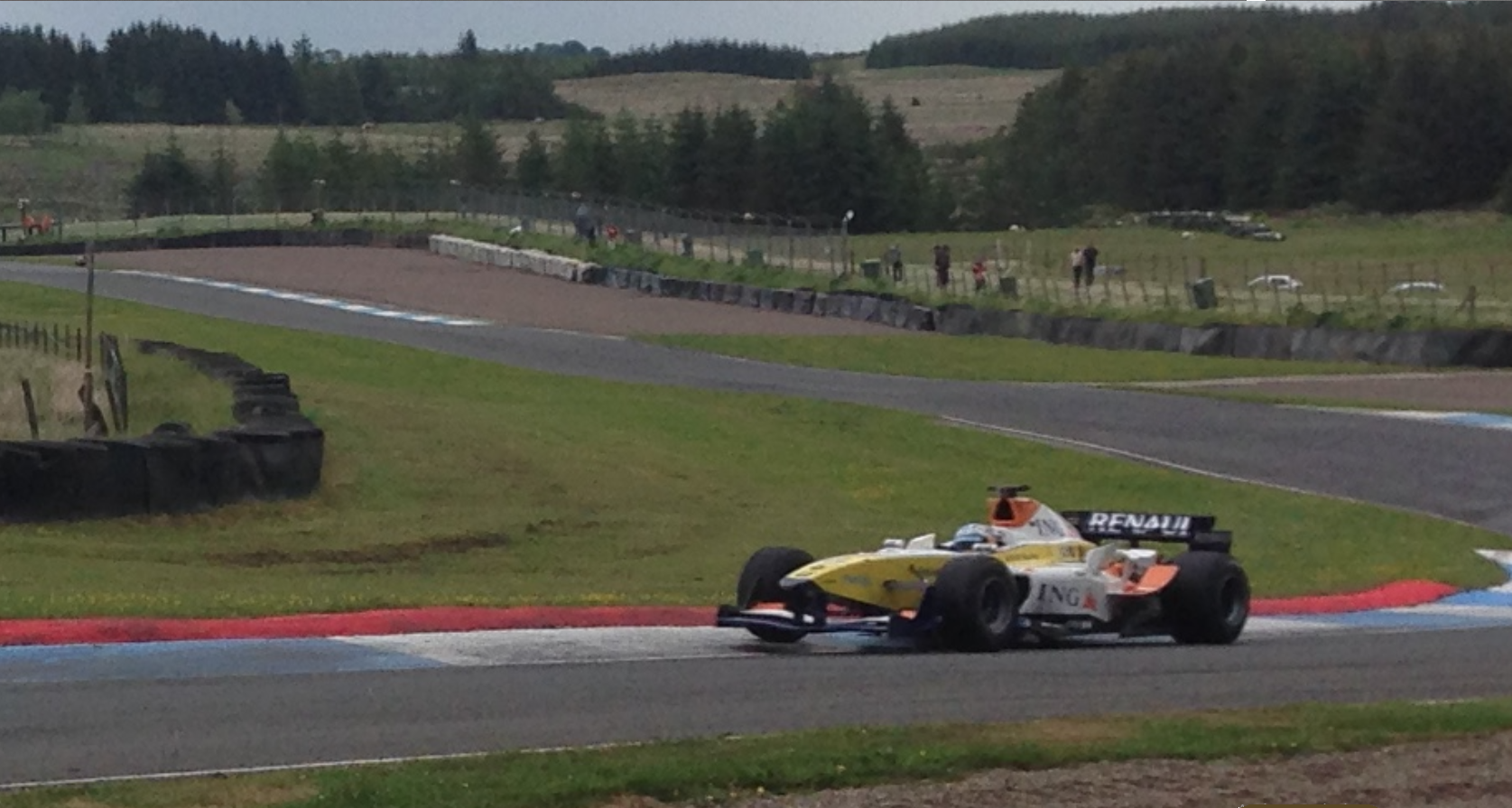
A car in Renault Formula 1 colours at Clark's corner

After the exit of McIntyre's there is a short straight leading to the next corner, a shallow right-hand corner named Butcher's. After this the track dips downward (reaching the lowest point of the circuit) before rising fairly steeply towards another very challenging corner. The Chicane is a challenge because the second, right-hand part of the corner is completely blind and drivers do not see the apex of the second part until after they have turned in and it is this combined with the presence of a sausage kerb on the inside of the track to deter corner cutting that results in vehicles often going through the chicane on two wheels (and occasionally off the ground completely). After a run down the short back straight comes the next corner, Clark's, a blind uphill right hander, frequently the scene of vehicles getting onto two wheels and/or running wide into the gravel on the outside of the corner. Fairly quickly following this is a corner now named Hislop's but previously named Railway, with reference to the fact that it is this section of the track that runs along the location of the old railway line. This corner is a left-handed kink taken at relatively high speeds.

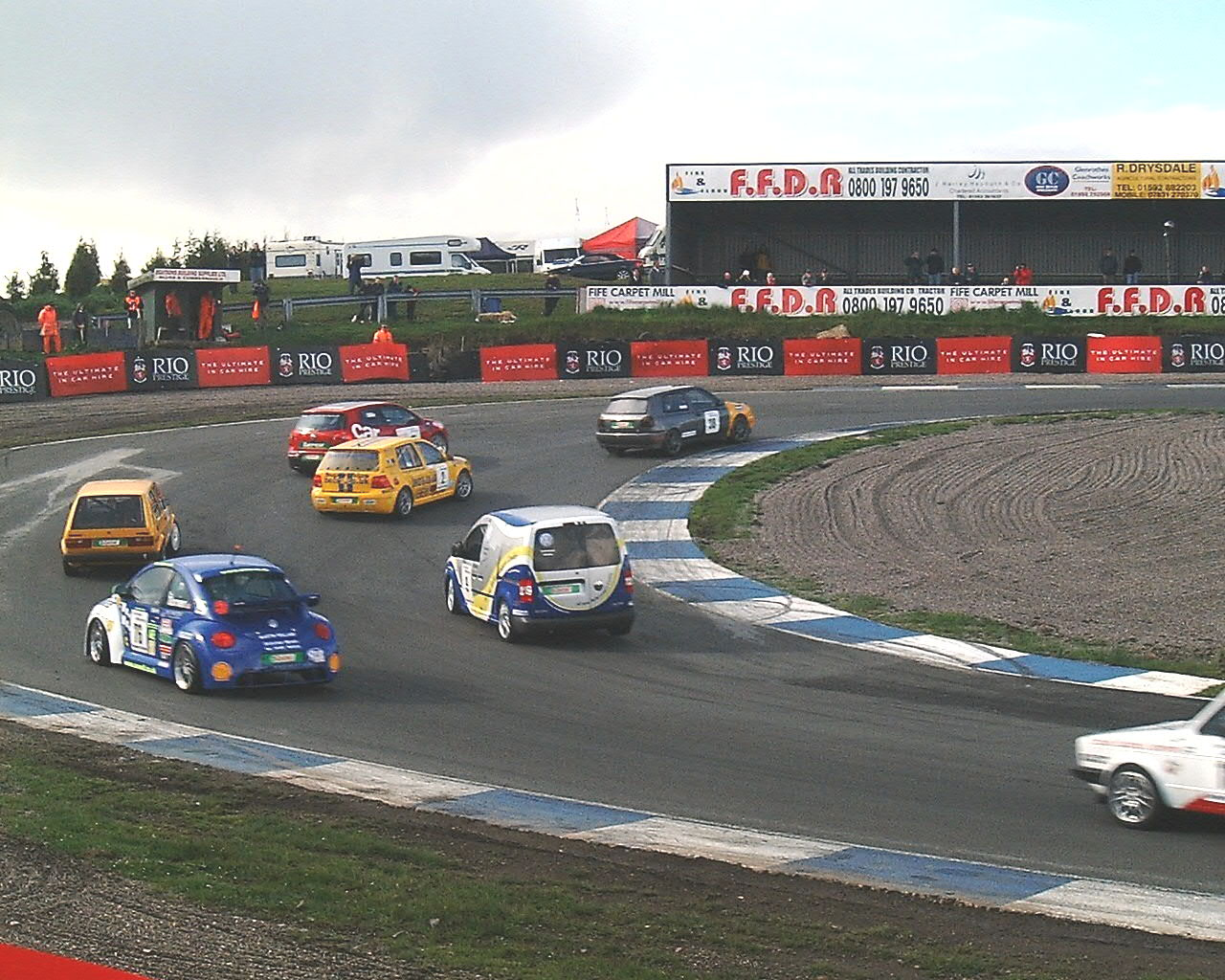
Some Volkswagens at Taylor's corner

Then comes the second-longest straight of the circuit, also named Railway, where vehicles often slipstream one another in preparation for the heaviest braking zone, belonging to the ninth and final corner. Taylor's is a hairpin corner that is one of the tightest found anywhere in the UK. It has an uphill apex, is arguably the best overtaking point of the circuit and was previously known as the Real Radio Hairpin for sponsorship reasons. Leaving Taylor's vehicles accelerate hard on the partly uphill pit straight towards the finish line.

== Events and facilities ==
The circuit hosts different events throughout the year, with the main points usually being the annual rounds of the British Touring Car Championship and British Superbike Championship. There are also lesser events such as the monthly meetings of the Scottish Motor Racing Club, Knockhill Motor Sports Club and Super Lap Scotland and regular trackdays for cars and bikes. Some events are exclusive to the circuit, such as legend racing and the Scottish Formula Ford Championship races. Highlights of these events are televised as part of a show on Motors TV. The circuit has on-site parking for 3,000 cars located in the areas south of Taylor's hairpin, Hislop's, Clark's and the Chicane.

Knockhill offers a range of motorsport facilities. In addition to the main circuit it has a concrete rally stage to the south of the hairpin, a 500-metre long karting circuit located east of the main paddock area, a skid pan to the east of the karting circuit and an offroad course located to the north of the main circuit. There is also another offroading course in the main circuit's infield, which is now used for Rallycross events following its re-profiling in 2019.

The main circuit offers track-driving experiences using a choice of Ferrari F430, Aston Martin Vantage, Legend race car, Honda Civic Type Rs and Audi-powered, Van Diemen single-seater formula cars. The rally stage can be used for a rally driving experience in modified Ford Fiestas, the skid pan for a skid-control driving experience in a number of different cars, and the offroad course using a Jeep Wrangler. The circuit offers motorsport taster days for people with disabilities, as well as a driving experience for those too young to legally drive on the public roads using Ford Fiestas.

== In popular culture ==
The circuit was the location for Kaiser Chiefs' "Hole in My Soul" music video, part of their Stay Together album, and appears in several video games, including Project CARS 2, Colin McRae: Dirt and some of the games in the TOCA series. It appeared on television in Episode 7 of Series 8 of the British motoring programme Top Gear and the first episode of Idris Elba: No Limits. The track also appeared in The Grand Tour presents: Lochdown, where the track is featured in a series of time trials performed by the presenters.

== Lap records ==
As of June 2026, the fastest official race lap records at the Knockhill Circuit are listed as:

Category	Time	Driver	Vehicle	Event
Clockwise International Circuit (1974–present): 2.0389 km (1.2669 mi)
British Sprint Championship	0:41.880	Heather Calder	Gould GR55	2018 Knockhill British Sprint Championship round
Formula Three	0:47.039	Ryan Lewis	Dallara F305	2005 Knockhill British F3 round
Superbike	0:47.126	Rory Skinner	Kawasaki ZX-10RR	2022 Knockhill BSB round
Division 1 Superkart	0:48.176	Lee Harpham	MS/VM Superkart	2024 Knockhill British Superkart Championship round
Formula 4	0:48.216	William Macintyre	Tatuus F4-T421	2023 Knockhill British F4 round
Formula Renault 2.0	0:48.438	Tom Blomqvist	Barazi-Epsilon FR2.0-10	2010 Knockhill Formula Renault 2.0 UK round
Porsche Carrera Cup	0:48.594	Gus Burton	Porsche 911 (992 I) GT3 Cup	2023 Knockhill Porsche Carrera Cup GB round
Formula Ford	0:48.595	Ashley Sutton	Mygale M12-SJ	2014 Knockhill British Formula Ford round
Supersport	0:49.025	Tom Booth-Amos	Kawasaki Ninja ZX-6R	2023 Knockhill BSS round
GT1 (GTS)	0:49.972	Thomas Erdos	Saleen S7-R	2002 Knockhill British GT round
GT3	0:50.468	Matt Griffin	Ferrari 430 Scuderia GT3	2010 Knockhill British GT round
GT4	0:50.694	Jacob Tofts	Porsche 718 Cayman GT4 RS Clubsport	2025 Knockhill Porsche Sprint Challenge Great Britain round
NGTC	0:50.876	Ashley Sutton	Infiniti Q50 BTCC	2020 Knockhill BTCC round
Formula BMW	0:51.124	Marcus Ericsson	Mygale FB02	2007 Knockhill Formula BMW UK round
Sportbike	0:51.470	Harley McCabe	Aprilia RS660	2026 Knockhill British Sportbike round
TCR Touring Car	0:51.855	Jenson Brickley	Cupra León Competición TCR	2023 Knockhill TCR UK round
GTO	0:52.002	Tim Sugden	Porsche 911 (996) GT3-R	2002 Knockhill British GT round
BMW F900R Cup	0:52.568	Barry Burrell	BMW F900R	2026 Knockhill BMW F900R Cup round
Super Touring	0:53.024	Laurent Aïello	Nissan Primera GT	1999 Knockhill BTCC round
Moto3	0:53.753	Amanuel Brinton	Honda NSF250R	2023 Knockhill British Talent Cup round
SEAT León Supercopa	0:54.133	Jonathan Adam	SEAT León Supercopa Mk2	2008 Knockhill SEAT Cupra Championship round
BTC Touring	0:55.334	Yvan Muller	BTC-T Vauxhall Astra Coupe	2001 Knockhill BTCC round
Renault Clio Cup	0.56.068	Jack Young	Renault Clio R.S. IV	2019 Knockhill Renault UK Clio Cup round
Group 5 (Sports 2000)	0:57.000	Richard Robarts	Lola T294	1975 RAC Knockhill
Anti-Clockwise International Circuit (1974–present): 2.0389 km (1.2669 mi)
British Sprint Championship	0:42.940	Heather Calder	Gould GR55	2018 Knockhill British Sprint Championship round
TCR Touring Car	0:51.691	Josh Price	Honda Civic Type R TCR (FK2)	2018 Knockhill TCR UK round

== See also ==
- Ingliston Racing Circuit
- Central Park, Cowdenbeath
- Driftland
