= Motorcycle sport =

Competitive events involving motorcycles

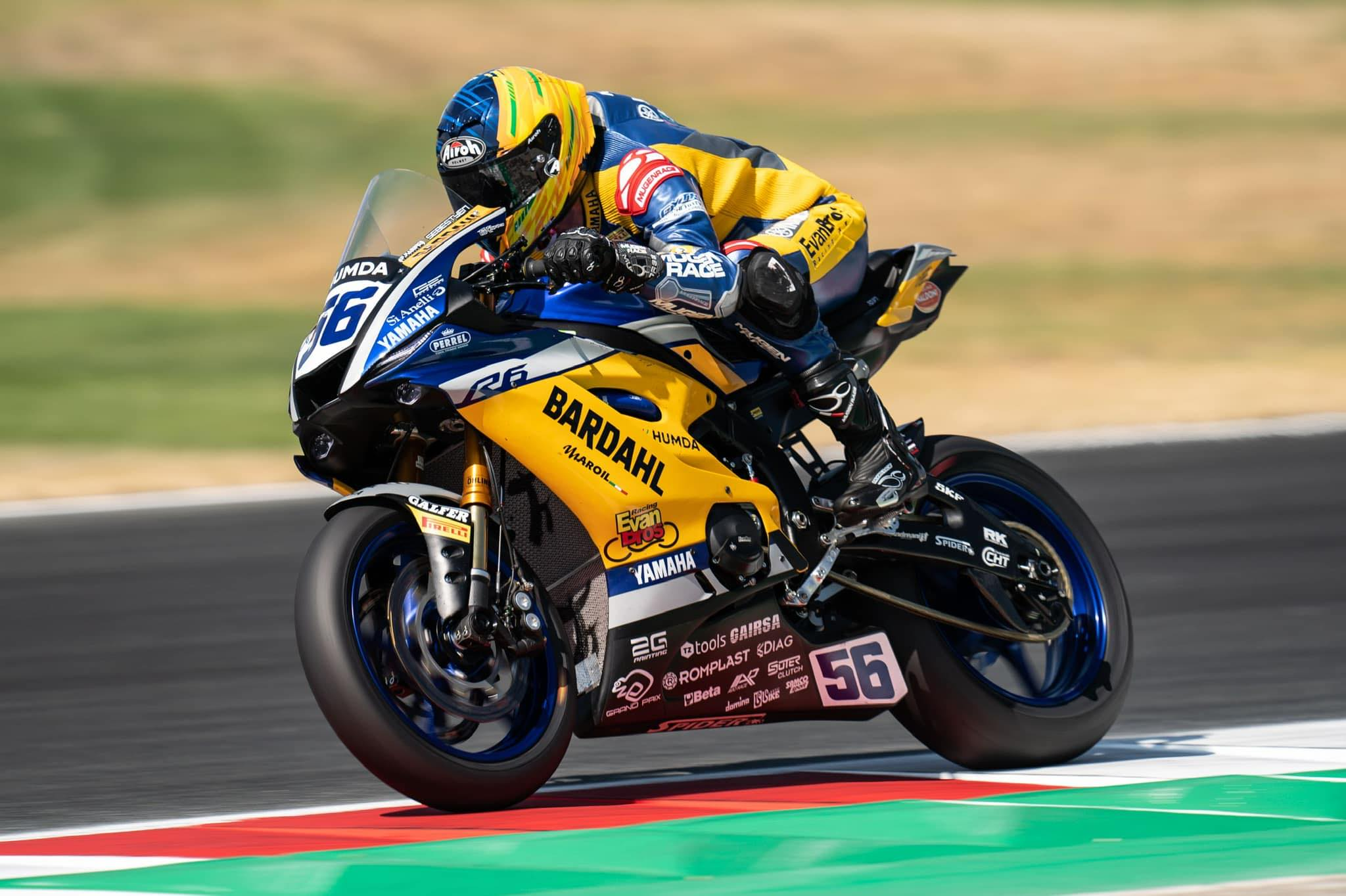
Road racing (Yamaha YZF-R6 on track)

Motorcycle sport is a subdiscipline of motorsport that encompasses competitive and recreational aspects of motorcycling which test competitors' riding abilities, including races and timed-speed events.

== Overview of motorcycle sport by surface type ==
Motorcycle sports can generally be categorized according to the nature of the track surface. Today, circuit racing and drag racing are held on paved surfaces (asphalt, concrete), while track racing, motocross, enduro, cross country, trial, and hill climbing take place on unpaved surfaces (grass, sand, loose rock, ice, snow). Hill climbs and rallies often represent mixed formats. Within the individual sports, there is a wide variety of competition formats and class divisions.

Differentiation of motorcycle sports by track surface

Bound surface (Asphalt, concrete)	Unbound surface (Grass, sand, gravel, loose rock, ice, snow etc.)
Road racing	Track racing
Drag racing	Motocross
Enduro
Rally raid
Trial

== Motorcycle racing disciplines ==
Motorcycle racing (also known as moto racing and motorbike racing) is a form of competition where riders race motorcycles. It can be divided into tarmac-based road disciplines and off-road.

=== Motocross ===
Motocross is a form of off-road motorcycle racing held on enclosed off-road circuits.

=== Road racing ===
Road racing is a form of motorcycle racing held on paved road surfaces. The races can be held either on a purpose-built closed circuit or on a street circuit utilizing temporarily closed public roads.

=== Track racing ===
Track racing is a motorcycle sport where teams or individuals race opponents around an oval unpaved track. There are multiple variants which race on different surface types.

=== Rally ===
Cross-country rallies take place mostly off-road using similar competitive elements to road and special stage rallying competitions.

=== Speedway ===
Speedway is a motorcycle sport in which racers use specialized motorcycles with one gear and no brakes to complete laps on a flat oval track.

=== Land speed ===
In land‑speed competition, a single rider accelerates along a straight track to maximize their velocity as they pass through a speed‑measurement trap near the end of the run. These tracks are typically 1 to 3 miles (1.6 to 4.8 km) long, often on dry lake beds. Records are categorized by class or type of bike.

=== Enduro ===
In enduro, riders navigate to a series of checkpoints across long cross-country courses with challenging terrain. In traditional time-keeping enduro, riders are on a strict schedule, with early and late checkpoint arrivals penalized, whereas in start control/restart enduro there is no penalty for arriving early.

=== Hillclimbing ===
In motorcycle hillclimbing, one competitor at a time attempts to ride up a steep dirt hill. If riders fail to complete the course, their results are judged on the distance that they manage to achieve. Of those that succeed, the rider to reach the top with the shortest elapsed time wins.

In the United States, France and Belgium, the completions are usually held on off-road courses. For years the national competitions was held at Mount Garfield near Muskegon, Michigan. The Widowmaker hill climb in Utah is also one of the most prestigious and best-known motorcycle hill climbs in the world. The motorcycle of choice in the early decades was the Harley-Davidson 45 cubic inch model due to its high torque at low RPM, similar to farm engines.

The motorcycles used are often modified motocross bikes, with common modifications including lengthened swingarms and specialized rear tires, such as paddle or studded tires for increased traction.

=== Road hill climb ===
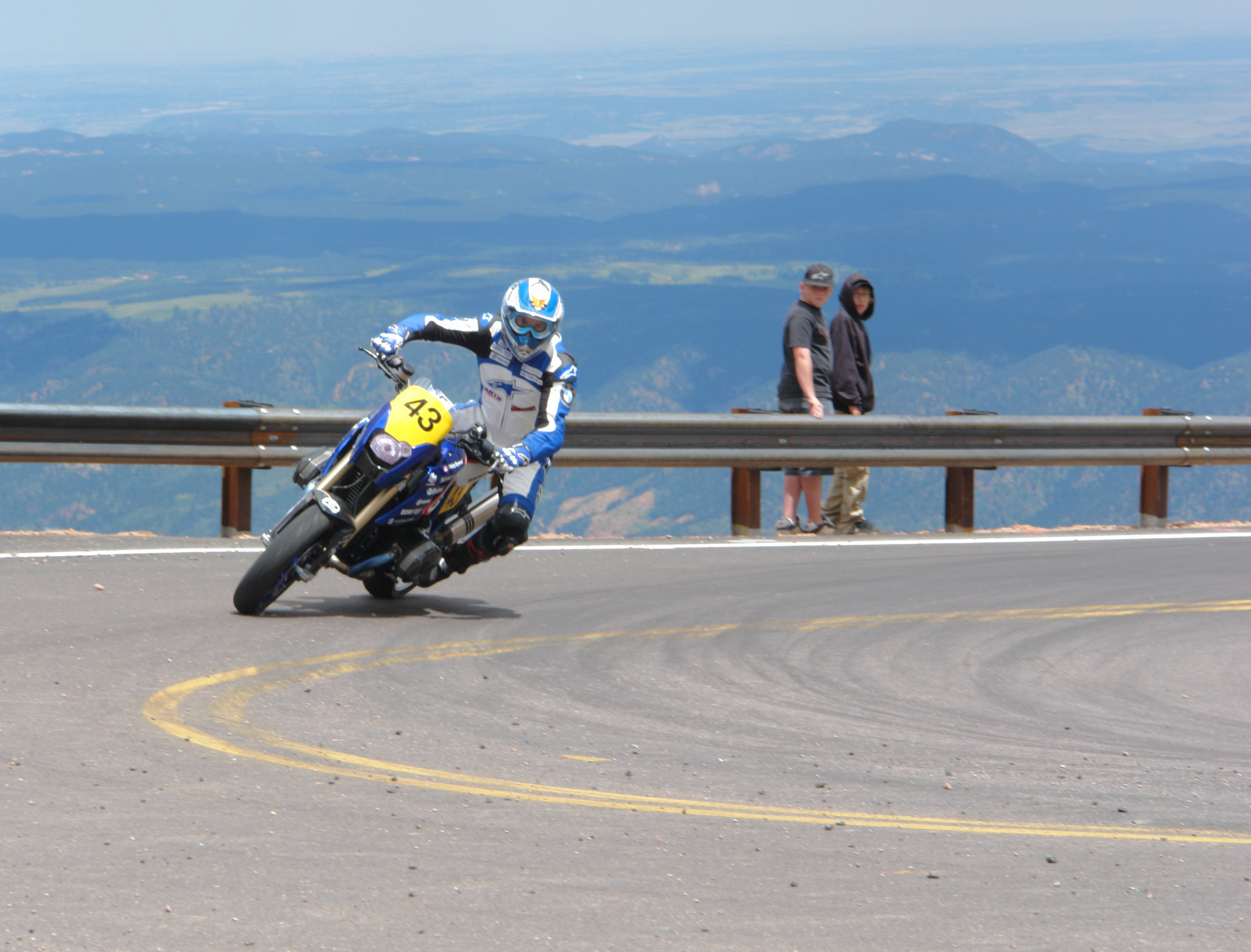
Motorcyle hill climb at Pikes Peak

Road hill climb takes place on tarmac courses and occasionally closed public roads, with the machines used for competition being similar to those used for other road disciplines. The most notable competitions are the NHCA in the United Kingdom and the FIM Europe Hill Climb Road Race Championship held in Italy, Austria, and Germany.

== Other motorcycle sports ==
=== Freestyle motocross ===
Freestyle motocross (also known as FMX) is a variation on motocross in which riders attempt to impress judges with jumps and stunts.

=== Gymkhana ===
Gymkhana is a motorcycle time trial event similar to autocross where participants navigate around traffic cones on a paved course as fast as possible. Time penalties are incurred by putting a foot down, hitting a cone, or going outside the designated area.

=== Trials ===
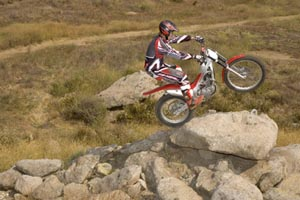
Trials commonly take place on rocky terrain

Motorcycle trials, also known as observed trials and often shortened to trial or trials, are tests of skill whereby riders attempt to traverse an observed section without placing a foot on the ground (and traditionally, although not always, without ceasing forward motion). Though most trials are done outdoors on natural terrain, some are held in stadiums with artificially constructed courses.

==== Time and observation ====
Time and observation trials are trials with a time limit. The first person who completes the route sets the "standard time"; all other competitors must finish within a certain period after that time to be counted as a finisher, receiving penalty points for every minute they are behind. This is combined with the penalty points accrued from the observed sections to determine the winner. One of the most famous time and observation trials is the Scott Trial held annually in North Yorkshire.

==== Long distance trials ====
In the UK, Long Distance Trials (often shortened to LDT) are non-race events for road-registered motorcycles. A course of typically 80 to 120 miles (130 to 190 km) is plotted by the organizer, taking in roads, lanes and Byways Open to All Traffic (known as BOATs). Riders are required to follow the course using a roadbook compiled by the organizer.

=== Motoball ===
Motoball, or motorcycle polo, is a sport where 4 players on each team ride motorcycles to pitch a large ball into a net, which is guarded by a goalkeeper on foot. It is similar to association football and polo.

=== Stunt riding ===
Motorcycle stunt riding is a motorsport which involves stunts known as wheelies, stoppies, acrobatics, burnout, drifting, and jumping. Motorcycles are sometimes modified to do multiple tricks (handbreak, subcage, crashcage, stopper, etc.).
