= Cosworth KF engine =

Cosworth-Opel KF engine

Overview
- Manufacturer: Cosworth-Opel
- Production: 1993-1996

Layout
- Configuration: Naturally aspirated 54°-75° V-6
- Displacement: 2.5 L (153 cu in)
- Cylinder bore: 94 mm (3.7 in)
- Piston stroke: 60 mm (2.4 in)
- Valvetrain: 24-valve, DOHC, four valves per cylinder
- Compression ratio: 12.5:1

Combustion
- Turbocharger: No
- Fuel system: Fuel injection
- Oil system: Dry sump

Output
- Power output: 450–540 hp (336–403 kW) @ 11,650-12500 rpm
- Torque output: 220 lb⋅ft (298 N⋅m) @ 9000 rpm

Dimensions
- Length: 450 mm (18 in)
- Dry weight: 85–89 kg (187–196 lb)

The Cosworth-Opel KF engine is a production-based, four-stroke, 2.5-liter, naturally aspirated, V-6 high-revving racing engine, originally designed, developed and produced by Opel, in collaboration with Cosworth, for the DTM and later ITC, between 1993 and 1996. The engines were tuned by Cosworth, and were based on the Isuzu 6VD1 (1996) 75° production engine, as used in the Opel Monterey, Opel Frontera Limited, Trooper, Rodeo, and Amigo.

It is also used in the Gould GR51 open-wheel race car of the Hillclimb and Sprint Association (HSA) British Sprint Championship, since 2000.

== Applications ==
- Opel Calibra DTM V6 4x4
