= Sporting Car Club of South Australia =

Australian motor car club

The Sporting Car Club of South Australia, Australia's largest motor car club, was founded in Adelaide in 1934, making it one of the oldest in Australia. It has over 1700 members, including many who have been members for more than 50 years. The Sporting Car Club holds motorsport events and competitions and runs the majority of events at Mallala, including the South Australian Motor Racing Championships. It also runs National, State and Club events at the Collingrove Hillclimb Track, which it owns.

Its collection of motorsport and motoring information in the Eric Rainsford Library is one of the largest in the southern hemisphere—over 7000 volumes available to members and, for research, to non-members.

All sections of the club organise Club events and social gatherings such as hill climbs, runs and rallies.

As well as the love of cars and enjoyment of motorsport, the club also encourages the preservation and restoration of historic motor vehicles.
