= Gould Racing =

British motorsport company

- Industry: Racing car manufacture and engineering
- Headquarters: Newbury, Berkshire, England
- Products: GR37; GR51; GR55/GR55B; GR59; GR61X
- Owner: David Gould
- Website: www.gould-racing.co.uk

Gould Racing is a British motorsport company, specialising in racing car manufacture and engineering. The company is run by David Gould, and is based in Newbury, Berkshire, England.

Although involved in several branches of motorsport, including manufacturing components for Formula One cars, the company's greatest success has come in the manufacture of specialised cars for hillclimbing: every British Hill Climb Championship from 1998 to 2010 was won by a driver in a Gould car. The company also built the one-off Gould Ford Puma for Mike Endean, featuring Xtrac four-wheel-drive, which won the Brighton Speed Trials four times in 2005, 2008, 2009 and 2010.

== British Hillclimb Championship ==
Gould Racing has enjoyed massive and sustained success in the British Hillclimb Championship having won 19 titles in total, the first of which was when Chris Cramer took the 1985 at the wheel of a Gould/Hart 84/2 and the remaining 18 titles being taken in from 1998 to 2016, 14 of these being taken in succession, breaking Cooper's record of 13 successive title wins from 1951 to 1963 (though Peter Westbury only raced part of his 1963 championship winning season in a Cooper). Over the last 18 championship winning seasons Gould have gradually evolved their cars, with the GR37, GR51, GR55, GR55B, GR59 and GR61 chassis all winning the championship on at least 2 occasions.

== GR37 ==
The Gould GR37 was ground-breaking in terms of hillclimb technology. Built around a Ralt F3 carbon-fibre tub, this car was raced to 3 consecutive titles by David Grace from 1998 to 2000, breaking Pilbeam's domination of the championship that had seen it win 17 of the previous 21 championships. It has typically utilised Cosworth or Judd V8 power ranging from the 3.3-litre Cosworth XB derived V8 to the 4-litre Judd and Cosworth F1 3.5-litre formula derived V8 engines. The Gould GR37 is still competing in the championship as of 2010. It was also the first carbon fibre chassis to win the championship.

== GR51 ==
The Gould GR51 refined the concept of the GR37. The chassis, whilst based on a Ralt carbon fibre tub, was further customised for its application in hill climbing. The chassis was mated to a DTM-derived Opel-Cosworth V6 engine enlarged to 2.8 litres from the original 2.5 litres and mated to an Arrows F1 gearbox. Whilst down on absolute power compared to the 4-litre V8 monsters of its competitors, the compactness and light weight of the car, engine and gearbox gave the GR51 a greater power-to-weight ratio, which resulted in a car perfectly suited to the tortuously twisty hillclimbs of the British Championship. With Scottish father-and-son duo of Graeme Wight and Graeme Wight Jr. campaigning the car, Wight Jr. sealed two consecutive championships at the wheel of the GR51 in 2001 and 2002. Graeme Wight Jr. competed at the Goodwood Festival Of Speed in this car in 2002 & 2003, the only occasions where a contemporary British Hillclimb Championship car has appeared at this most prestigious of events.

== GR55 and GR55B ==
The Gould GR55 marked a departure from using Ralt F3 chassis and all major components were designed and manufactured "in house". However, in terms of aerodynamics and general chassis philosophy it was very much an evolution of the GR51. The GR55 was originally fitted with a Nicholson-McLaren 3.3 Litre V8 derived from a Ford Cosworth XB 2.65-litre Champcar unit but enlarged and naturally aspirated rather than turbo-charged. The GR55 was originally campaigned by Adam Fleetwood and he duly took back-to-back titles in 2003 and 2004 before graduating from the British Hillclimb Championship to go circuit racing.

In 2005 Gould introduced the GR55B, externally the GR55 and GR55B are near identical, however the GR55B was the result of extensive finite element analysis work (FEA) which resulted in every part of the car being scrutinised to reduce weight and refine the GR55. The result was a car that was 25 kg lighter than its predecessor now fitted with a 3.5-litre version of the Nicholson-McLaren engine. The GR55B went on to dominate the championship in the hands of Martin Groves, winning the title 3 times in succession (2005, 2006 & 2007) and then he came back to claim a 4th title in 2010 using the same car after being defeated in 2008 & 2009, an achievement unique in hillclimbing.

Both the GR55 and GR55B have become very popular with competitors in the British Championship with a variety of engines being installed in GR55 chassis, including f1 derived Cosworth HB 3.5-litre and Judd 4-litre V8 engines. Also more recent modifications have included F1-style paddle shift sequential gears and traction control.

== GR61X ==
The Gould GR61X is a further evolution of the Gould line of hillclimb cars. It was produced around the same time as the GR55B as a one-off design produced for father and son duo Roger and Scott Moran. It sees further refinements to the aerodynamics as well as offering enhanced lateral head protection from its higher cockpit sides and padded cockpit surround. It utilises the same 3.5-litre Nicholson-McLaren V8 engine as Martin Groves' GR55B. The car was instantly competitive when it hit the hills in 2005 and ultimately culminated in Scott Moran clinching back-to-back titles in 2008 and 2009 with further titles taken in 2011, 2013, 2014 & 2016 which make Roger and Scott Moran the first father and son title winners in British Hillclimbing as Roger claimed Pilbeam's final British title in 1997. After Roger retired from top-flight hillclimbing at the end of the 2014 season Alex Summers added to the success of this chassis, winning the 2015 title driving the car alongside Scott Moran. The GR61X was the first Gould chassis to be fitted with F1-style paddle shift sequential gears and traction control, which have since been fitted to GR55 chassis (Rob Turnbull and John Bradburn's GR55's were the first to have paddle shift fitted - the Geartronics system) as well as the Pilbeam M97.

== GR59 ==
In 2012 Gould unveiled their all-new hillclimb chassis, the Gould GR59. This chassis was a departure of previous Gould chassis with a much more compact design, extensive use of carbon fibre in the suspension (including the use of carbon fibre pushrods) and a full supporting structure at the rear end allowing the use of non-stressed engines. This car features a raised nose and chassis front end (the GR55 and GR61X had a raised nose mated to a low chassis front end) which has undergone development since the car debuted, in 2016 a dramatic new front wing was introduced, a very sculptured 3 plane design rendered in carbon fibre of course. The car also has an evidently powerful underfloor to give the car downforce whilst minimising aerodynamic drag, this is evidenced by the fact that the car debuted with a rear wing which is much smaller, with less overhang and height than the generous regulations allow. Previous chassis have debuted with skinnier wings but have piled them on to achieve the right balance, however, the only change to the GR59's rear wing since debut has been the addition of an extra element in the lower beam wing (introduced in conjunction with the 3 element front wing) which points to enhancing underfloor performance as well as gaining extra downforce in itself. Another distinctive feature of the GR59 is the car's light and slim rollover structure which helps to lower the COG and minimising drag all whilst passing MSA rollover tests. To date this chassis has been run with a variety of powerplants from a turbocharged 1300cc motorcycle engine to an enlarged and naturally aspirated 3300cc Cosworth XD V8 proving the car's concept as a one size fits all solution for hillclimbing.
