= Gould GR51 =

- Constructor: Gould Racing

Technical specifications
- Chassis: Carbon fiber composite monocoque
- Suspension: Double wishbones, coil springs over shock absorbers, anti-roll bars
- Engine: Mid-engine, longitudinally mounted, 2.8 L (170.9 cu in), Opel-Cosworth (Isuzu 6VD1-derived), DOHC, 75° V6, NA, mid-engined
- Transmission: 6-speed manual
- Power: 500 hp (373 kW)
- Weight: 475 kg (1,047 lb)

Competition history

The Gould GR51 is an open-wheel race car, designed, developed and built by British company Gould Racing, specifically for the British Sprint Championship, since 2000.
