= Gould GR37 =

- Constructor: Gould Racing

Technical specifications
- Chassis: Carbon fiber composite monocoque
- Suspension: Double wishbones, coil springs over shock absorbers, anti-roll bars
- Engine: Mid-engine, longitudinally mounted, 3.5 L (213.6 cu in), Cosworth DFR, DOHC, 90° V8, NA, mid-engined Mid-engine, longitudinally mounted, 4.0 L (244.1 cu in), Judd EV, DOHC, 90° V8, NA, mid-engined
- Transmission: Hewland FGC 4-speed manual
- Power: 620–680 hp (462–507 kW)
- Weight: 1,177 lb (534 kg)

Competition history

The Gould GR37 is an open-wheel race cars, designed, developed, and built by British company Gould Racing, specifically for the British Sprint Championship, since 1994.
