= Gould GR61X =

- Constructor: Gould Racing

Technical specifications
- Chassis: Carbon fiber composite monocoque
- Suspension: Double wishbones, coil springs over shock absorbers, anti-roll bars
- Engine: Mid-engine, longitudinally mounted, 3.5 L (213.6 cu in), NME XB, DOHC, 90° V8, NA, mid-engined
- Transmission: 6-speed semi-automatic sequential manual
- Power: 650 hp (485 kW)
- Weight: 475 kg (1,047 lb)

Competition history

The Gould GR61X is an open-wheel race car, designed, developed and built by British company Gould Racing, specifically for the British Sprint Championship, since 2003.
