= Widowmaker hill climb =

Motorcycle sport event in Draper, Utah, U.S.

Coordinates: 41°04′04″N 111°30′48″W

- On May 19, 1985, Mark Cox successfully topped the 1,000-foot hill twice on a stretched 1985 Honda CR500, taking 6th place in the 0-700cc Exhibition class and qualifying for the top-ten Coors Shoot-Off."also can be noted in print edition of Cycle News (June 5, 1985, Vol. XXII, No. 21).

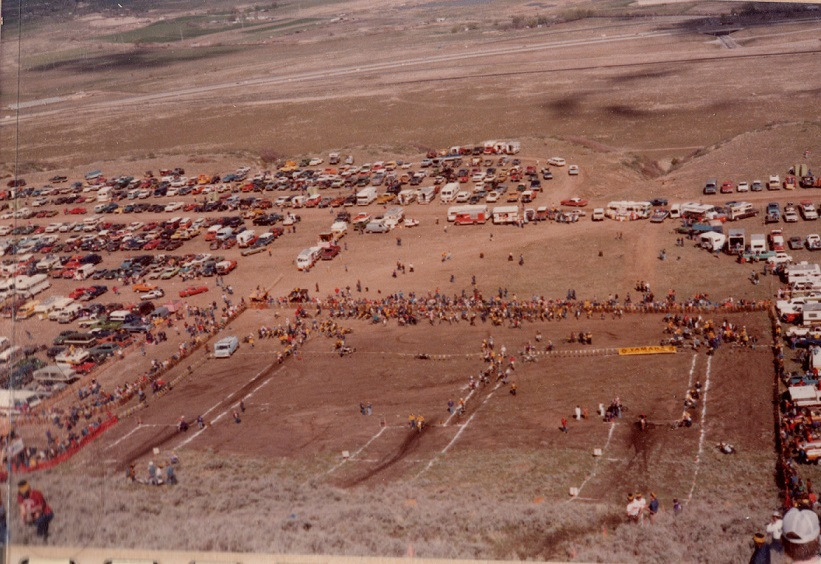
Photo from Widowmaker

The Widowmaker hill climb is an outdoor motorcycle sport event held annually and sometimes semi-annually in Draper, Utah, United States. The name comes from the danger associated with navigating the steep hill, which threatens to make widows of women whose husbands attempt the event. The event was founded in 1964 and went inactive in about 1988, followed by a 2003 revival that was active until at least 2009.

It consists of two major professional competitions, the first being the motorcycle hill climb, which is held usually in the month of June of each year. The second competition is the snowmobile hill climb, which is usually held in the month of January. However, there are many more types of sub-competitions held, including competitions for amateur motorcyclist, ATV, and snowmobile riders.

The Widowmaker become a popular event, both on the local riding circuit, and nationally with pro-riders. This has been attributed to the mountain's difficulty level. Even in the highest levels of pro-circuit riders there have been 13 as of March 8, 2009 that have been able to summit the 1000 foot level, over the 6 years that the event has been held.

On March 8, 2009, MTV's Nitro Circus visited the Widowmaker. Among the members of those who attempted to try to summit the 1000 foot mark was motocross legend Travis Pastrana. Although Travis was unsuccessful in his attempt, it was "summited" that day for only the 13th time in the mountain's history. The first rider to reach the top was Mike Gibbons in 1970, of Grants Pass, Oregon. Gibbons' victory was filmed as part of the 1971 Bruce Brown motorcycle documentary film, On Any Sunday.
