= Dean Tighe =

Australian mechanic, engineer, and race car driver

- Nationality: (Australia) Australian
- Born: Dean Joseph Tighe; 17 June 1966 (age 60) Brisbane, Queensland, Australia
- Relatives: Ivan Tighe (father); Martin Tighe (brother)

Australian Hillclimb Championship career
- Car number: 12
- Championships: 1
- Wins: 1
- Podiums: 2

Championship titles
- 2023 2022: Australian Supersprint Championship; Australian Hillclimb Championship; Australian Supersprint Championship

Dean Joseph Tighe (born 17 June 1966) is an Australian mechanic, engineer, and race car driver. Tighe developed a passion for motorsport at a young age, because of his father, Ivan Tighe, a racer and engine builder. He began building engines during his youth. Tighe pursues a Bachelor of Mechanical Engineering at the Queensland University of Technology.

== Early life and career ==
He attended speedway events and developed an interest in racing. At the age of 10, Tighe started racing motorbikes, and by 12, he had built his first engine. He won the Queensland Short Circuit Motocross Championship with an engine he built during his senior year of school.

Tighe aspired to become a race car driver. However, when his brother Martin Tighe unexpectedly died, he found himself managing the family business, Ivan Tighe Engineering, while simultaneously pursuing his studies. Tighe became the head of the business, now known as Tighe Cams. The company produced custom-made camshafts. Tighe Cams has worked to manufacture camshafts for the Australian-built Collins-class submarines used by the Royal Australian Navy.

== Racing career ==
Tighe became the Australian Hillclimb Champion after winning the Motorsport Australia Supersprint Championship.

Throughout his racing career, Tighe has worked on contributing to the engine tuning of the ANZ Ford Sierra RS500, driven by Allan Moffat and the late Gregg Hansford in the 1988 Enzed Sandown 500.

== See also ==
- Motorsport
- Mechanical Engineering
- Camshaft
