= Hillclimbing =

Type of competitive motorsport

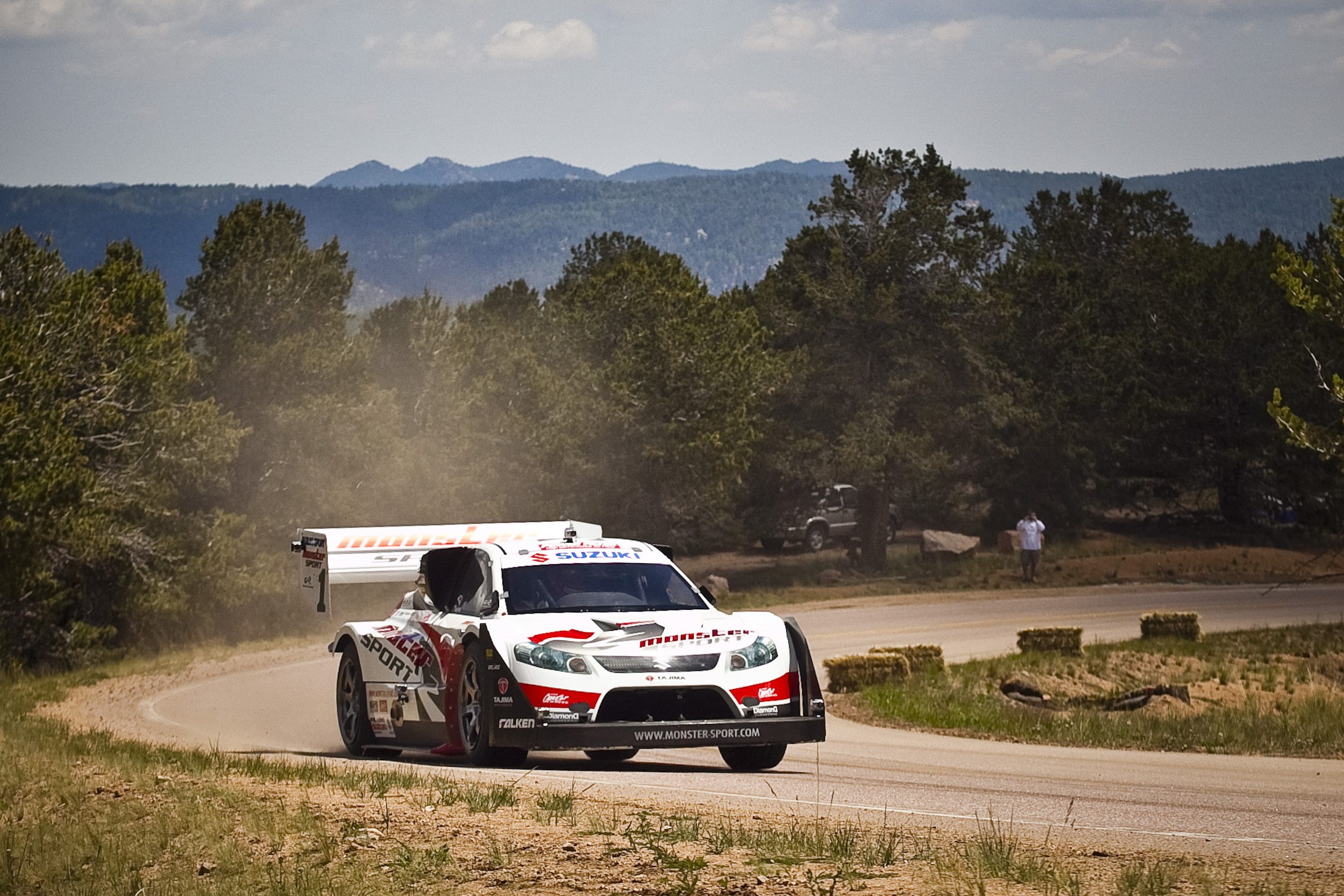
Suzuki SX4 at the 2010 Pikes Peak International Hill Climb

Hillclimbing, also known as hill climbing, speed hillclimbing, or speed hill climbing, is a branch of motorsport in which drivers compete against the clock to complete an uphill course. It is one of the oldest forms of motorsport, dating back to the first known hillclimb at La Turbie near Nice, France, on January 31, 1897. The hillclimb held at Shelsley Walsh, in Worcestershire, England, is the world's oldest continuously staged motorsport event still run on its original course, first run in 1905.

Motorcycle hillclimbing can take part on steep dirt hills.

== Europe ==
Hillclimbs in continental Europe are usually held on courses which are several kilometers long, taking advantage of the available hills and mountains, including the Alps. The most prestigious competition is the FIA European Hill Climb Championship.

=== Austria ===
An Austrian venue: Gaisberg. A historic course is at Semmering.

=== France ===
The French hill climb championship, or Championnat de France de la Montagne, has been one of the most competitive of the European national series, attracting many new F2 and 2-liter sports cars during the 1970s and early 1980s. Notable champions from this period include Pierre Maublanc (1967 and 1968), Daniel Rouveyran (1969), Hervé Bayard (1970), and Jimmy Mieusset (1971, 1972, 1973, and 1974). The best-known Course de Côte are Mont Ventoux and Mont-Dore.

=== Germany ===
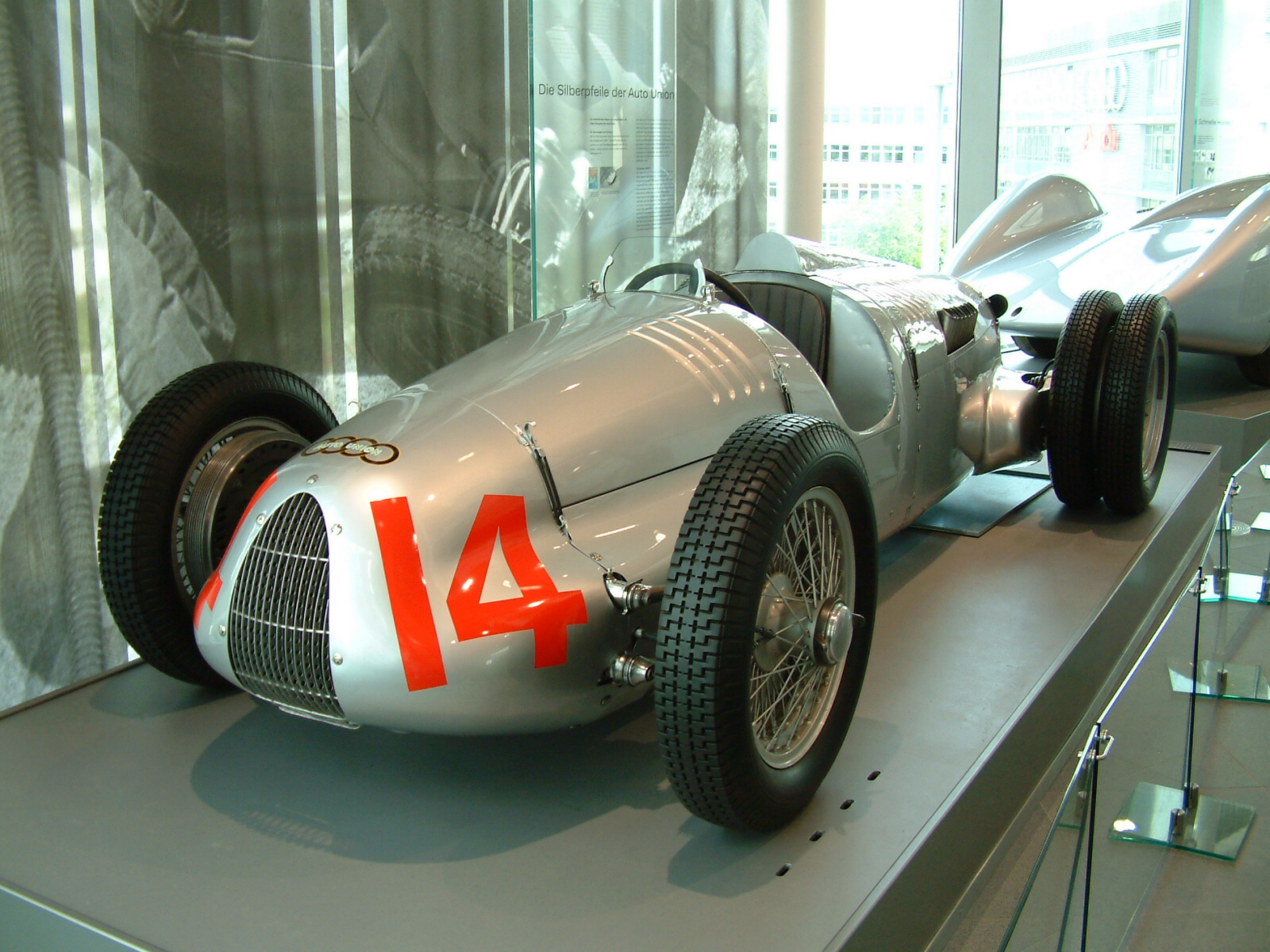
1939 Auto Union Type C/D V16 hillclimb car with double rear wheels

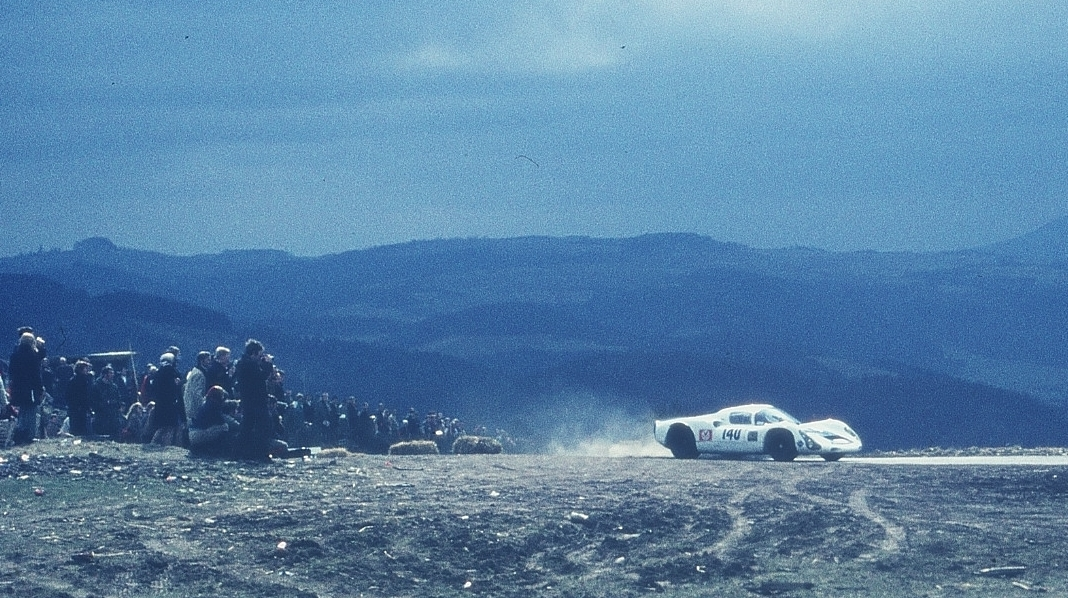
Porsche 910 in the 1969 Bad Neuenahr hillclimb

Germany has a long hillclimbing tradition, with some car and motorcycle manufacturers fielding factory teams until ″Bergrennen″ became amateur events in the 1970s. Two states, Nordrhein-Westfalen and Baden-Württemberg, no longer allow hillclimbing racing events, mostly for environmental reasons. Thus, the probably most famous event, the Freiburg-Schauinsland race in the Black Forest, is not a competition anymore like almost 100 years ago, when the fourth International Schauinsland hillclimb at Freiburg was held on August 5, 1928: "A car made the fastest time of the day, Heusser's Bugatti putting up 74.009 km/h, the fastest motorcycle being Stegmann's DKW at 69.6 km/h." Caracciola (Mercedes) won the over two-liter racing car class.

In the 1930s, during the era of the famous "Silver Arrows" from Auto Union and Mercedes-Benz, Hans Stuck (1900–1978) dominated European hillclimbing, which earned him the nickname "Bergkönig" or "King of the Mountains". The high-powered, supercharged Grand Prix cars were often modified to use twin rear tires, like trucks, to provide better traction.

Germany has only a small share of the Alps, and few climbs there, like the "Jochrennen" from Hindelang to Oberjoch, with the Rossfeld race in the Berchtesgaden Alps being part of the 1965 World Sportscar Championship. At that time, Porsche introduced lightweight open-top "Bergspyder" variants as their racing models were designed for endurance racing lasting up to 24 hours, with the Porsche 909 Bergspyder being the most extreme, weighing in at only 384kg.

Thus, most German hillclimbs are in the Mittelgebirge regions, but even the rather flat northern part of Germany has hillclimbs, like the one in Hilter near Osnabrück, which is part of the German "Berg Cup" series. In the 2023 calendar, Schottenring, Wolsfeld, Iberg near Heilbad Heiligenstadt, Homburg, Saarland, Hauenstein near Hausen, Rhön-Grabfeld, Eichenbühl, Mickhausen are the events in Germany. Additional rounds are held in Luxembourg, Austria, or Switzerland.

=== Great Britain ===
In Great Britain, the format differs from that in other parts of Europe, with courses much shorter. Cairncastle is Great Britain's longest hillclimb at 1.65 mi (2.66 km). These short courses are more akin to uphill sprints – and almost always take under one minute for the fastest drivers to complete. For this reason, cars and drivers do not generally cross between the British and continental European championships.

Hillclimbing is also relevant to motorcycle sport; the governing body is the National Hill Climb Association.

=== Italy ===
In the Italian championship, also known as the Campionato Italiano Velocità Montagna, there are the longest and most challenging hillclimbs like Trento-Bondone, Coppa Bruno Carotti (the Italian races in FIA European Hill Climb Championship), Pedavena-Croce d'Aune, Cronoscalata Monte Erice and Verzegnis-Sella Chianzutan, which are also the most known.

Hillclimbing in Italy became famous in the 1970s, early 1980s, between 1994 and 2000, and at the end of the 2000s, especially in the last two periods, thanks to TV services, magazines, and live Internet commentaries.

The most famous Italian drivers, who won a lot even in Europe, are Ludovico Scarfiotti (famous Ferrari driver who won the F1 race in Monza 1966), "Noris" (he won almost every race in Italy until 1972, when he died), Domenico Scola (who runs a Sport Prototype even now at the age of 80), Mauro Nesti (over 20 championships between Italy and Europe, from the 1970s to the 1990s), Ezio Baribbi (three times Italian champion), Fabio Danti (1994 Italian champion, 1995-96 European champion, died in 2000), Pasquale Irlando (Italian champion in the early 1990s and European champion in the last 1990s, the one who turned the Osella PA20), Franz Tschager (three times European champion in the early 2000s), Simone Faggioli and Denny Zardo (Italian champion in 2005 and 2008, European champion in 2003)

=== Malta ===
Hillclimbing is a very popular sport on the island of Malta. Numerous events are organized annually by the Island Car Club. Participants are divided by vehicle type into categories ranging from single-seaters to saloon cars.

=== Portugal ===
There are several traditional hillclimbing race events in Portugal, and the national championship has been growing in popularity since 2010. Falperra International Hill Climb is the most popular and famous hillclimb, being held since 1927, with most editions as part of the European Championship.

=== Romania ===
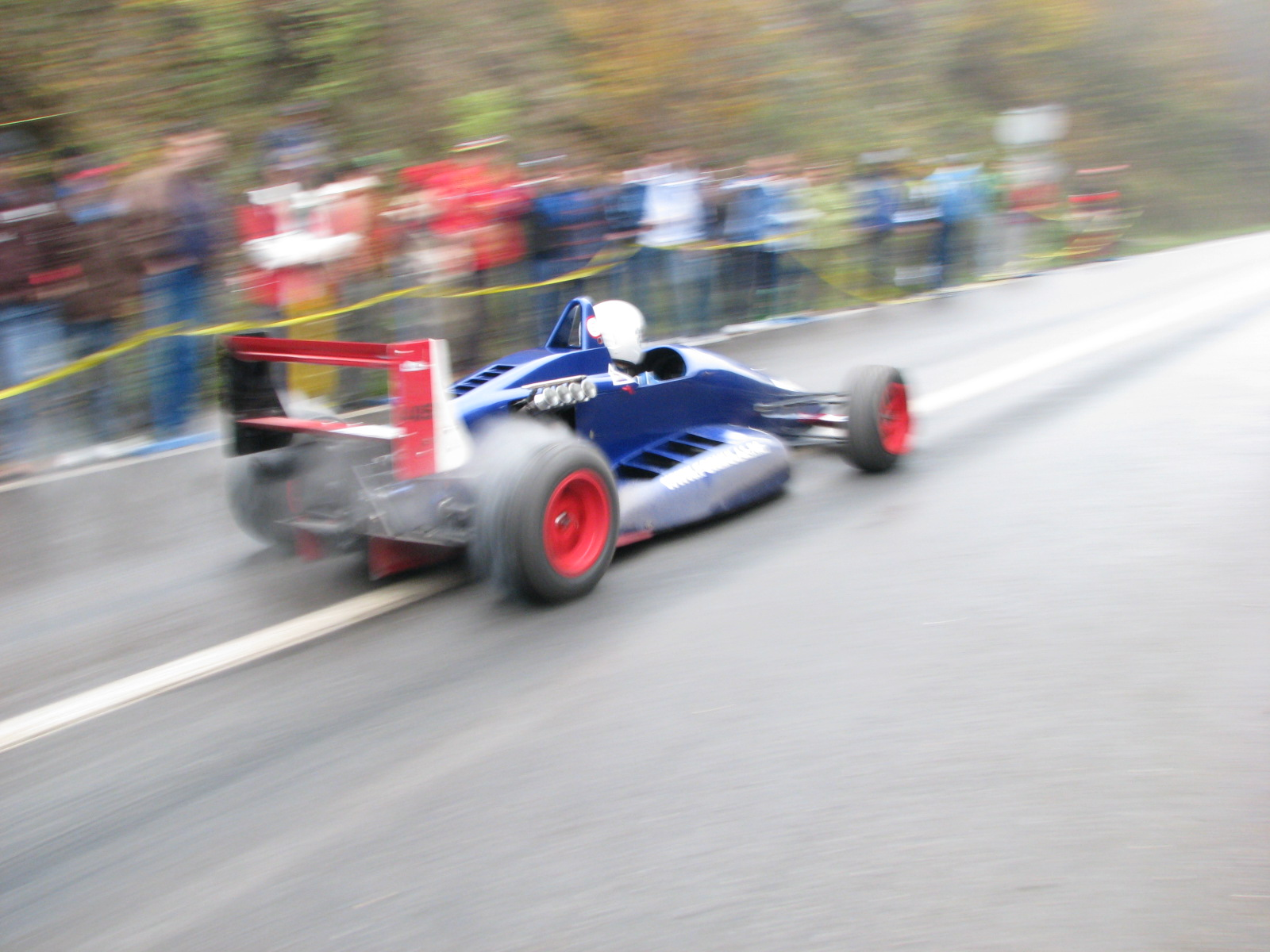
Reșița hillclimb 2007, Romania

In Romania, the first major event was the Feleac course, in Cluj. From 1930, it was a round in the European Hill Climb Championship. A record of the Feleac was set by famous German racer Hans Stuck in 1938, driving a 600 bhp (450 kW) Auto Union Grand Prix car. Stuck stormed through the 7 km (4.3 mi) gravel course in 2 min 56 sec. In recent decades, the course was widened to be suitable for heavy traffic and therefore is considered inappropriate for auto racing.

The modern Romanian hillclimbing event is the Viteză în Coastă or Campionatul Național de Viteză pe Traseu Montan (VTM).

=== Slovakia ===
There are several traditional hillclimbing race events in Slovakia. Some of the best-known and most popular include the Pezinská Baba hillclimb race and the Dobšinský Kopec hillclimb race.

One of the most well-known Slovak drivers competing in local and international hillclimb events is Jozef Béreš. Béreš is also very popular on social media networks thanks to the videos of him driving his legendary Audi Quattro S1 racecar.

=== Switzerland ===
Motor racing was banned in Switzerland in the aftermath of the fatal collision between cars at the 24 Hours of Le Mans race in 1955. However, this prohibition does not extend to events where drivers compete only indirectly via the clock. Events such as rallies, hillclimbs, and slaloms are very popular, including the FIA European Hill Climb Championship.

The most well-known hillclimb races are the Gurnigelrennen, the course en côte Ayent – Anzère, the course en côte St. Ursanne – Les Rangiers, and the historic Klausen Hill Climb known as the Klausenpassrennen. Ludovico Scarfiotti clinched the European hillclimb championship at Ollon-Villars on August 30, 1965, driving a Dino Ferrari 2-liter.

=== See also ===
- European Hill Climb Championship

== North America ==
=== Canada ===
Canada's best-known hillclimb event is the Knox Mountain Hillclimb, held in Knox Mountain Park in Kelowna, British Columbia. The course is a 3.5 km (2.2 mi) paved mountain access road, climbing 245 m (804 ft), and known for its challenge with off-camber corners flanked by cliffs and rock outcroppings. It has run annually since the 1950s, attracting drivers from the Pacific Northwest.

=== United States ===
- The Pikes Peak International Hill Climb is one of the most internationally recognized hillclimbs. Winners include Indy 500 driver Bobby Unser and world rally champions Walter Röhrl, Stig Blomqvist, Ari Vatanen and Sébastien Loeb.

- The Sports Car Club of America, Appalachian HillClimb Series is a nationally recognized hillclimb organization. Mainly competing on hills in the southeastern part of the country (NC, VA, KY), drivers from the west and farther north in Canada have participated in one or more AHS-hosted events. Hundreds of drivers have looked to compete, but with limited driver openings and quick sellouts, the series has seen an uptick in spectating interest and event volunteerism.

=== Mexico ===
Hillclimb races were held in México in the 1960s and 1970s in places like El Chico, Puebla and Lagunas de Zempoala.

On July 27, 1969, a very talented Mexican driver, Moisés Solana, died in the "Hill Climb Valle de Bravo-Bosencheve".

Since September 30, 2017, Pedro Vargas has founded the San Pedro Martir Hill Climb; the event is held in the Mexican state of Baja California. The temporary course was set on the road to the National Astronomical Observatory, situated in the San Pedro Mártir mountain range, between km markers 50 and 80. As of 2024, it is regarded as the world's longest hill climb. The overall ascent record was set by the late Carlin Dunne at 14' 58" piloting a Honda CRF 450 c.c. supermoto.

== Oceania ==
=== Australia ===
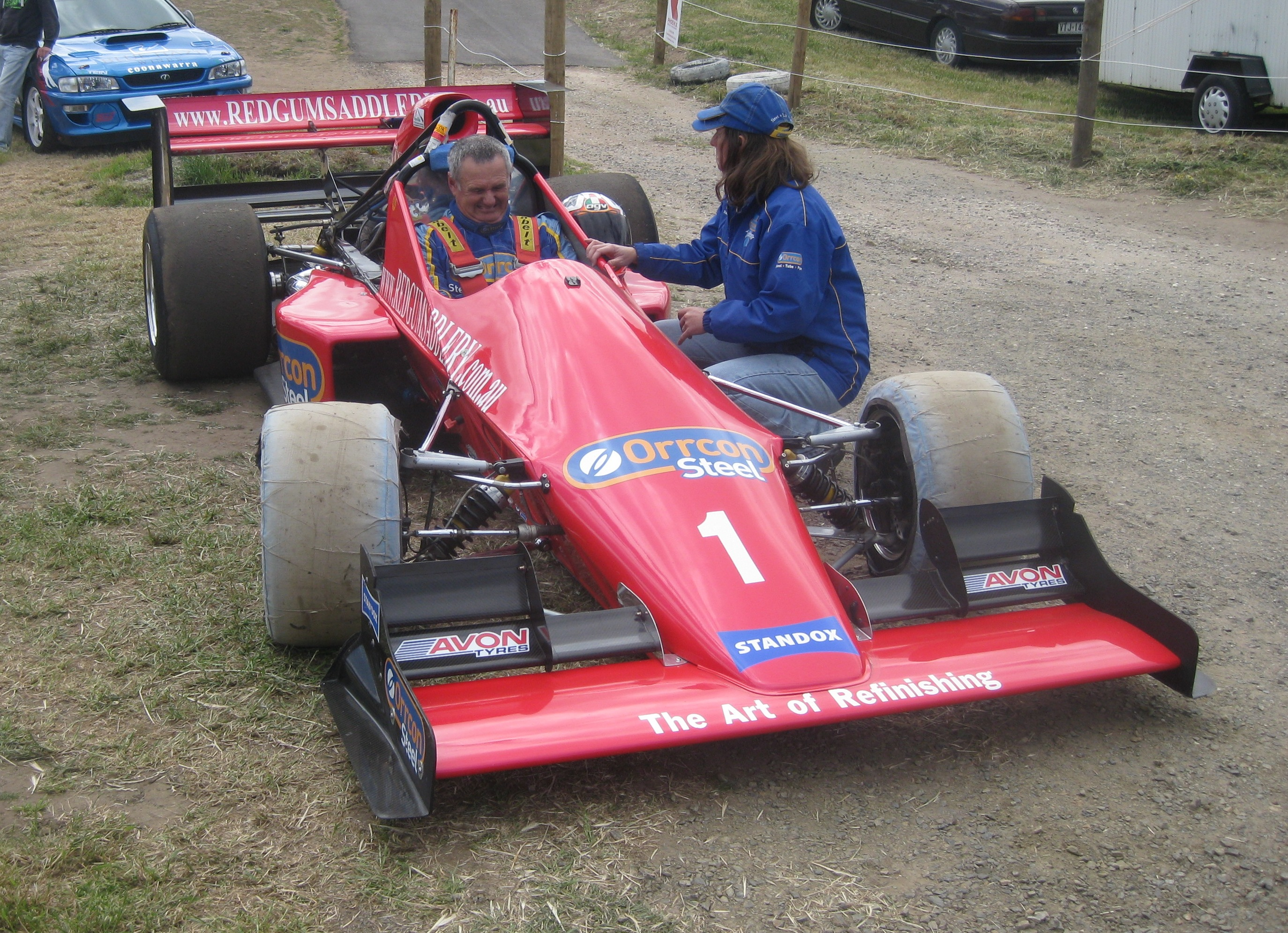
Peter Gumley has won the Australian Hillclimb Championship in his SCV on ten occasions

An Australian Hillclimb Championship was first staged in 1938 and has been contested annually since 1947.

Hillclimbing in Australia dates back to the early 1900s, and was most prevalent in the city of Melbourne, at locations such as Templestowe, Heidelberg, and Rob Roy.

The course at Templestowe still exists today in the Domain Wetlands. The course was never trafficable due to the massive incline known as "the wall", with an incline ratio of 1:2.5, which is thought to be the steepest bitumen surface in Australia, and so was only used during race events. Burgundy Street in Heidelberg was used for early Hillclimbs.

The course at Rob Roy regularly hosts race meetings, including rounds of the Victorian Hillclimb Championships. It is located just off Clinton's Road, Christmas Hills, in an area of Smiths Gully known as Rob Roy.

Mount Tarrengower, near Maldon in Central Victoria, has an annual Hillclimb hosted by the Victorian Vintage Sports Car Club, Bendigo Light Car Club, and the Historic Motorcycle Racing Association of Victoria. The event is held on the 3rd weekend of October. It is now a "classics" only event, after a serious accident in the 1970s. Vintage motorcycles are now a feature of this event. The current champion is Stacey Heaney, a 2-time winner and the only female competitor to take the title in the history of the climb, riding a 1971 Yamaha XS650.

The MG Car Club of Queensland Inc. (est. 1954) built the Mount Cotton Hillclimb circuit and continues with its current management and operation. The first event held at this facility was on Sunday, February 18, 1968. The dedicated 946 meters of tarmac circuit hosts the annual Queensland Hillclimb Championships, the Club's annual six-round Hillclimb series, and inter-club competitions. The Australian Hillclimb Championship has been held there on at least 9 occasions.

Australia's longest hillclimb course is the Poatina Hillclimb, a temporarily closed road course that features an elevation gain of 580 m (1,900 ft) in 10.6 km (6.6 mi), climbing Mount Blackwood from the Norfolk Plains to the Central Plateau of Northern Tasmania. The inaugural event, conducted in February 2014, covered 7.2 km (4.5 mi); the second running, in 2015, saw the course extended.

South Australia features the historic permanent venue Collingrove, as well as annual temporary venues including Mount Alma Mile, Willunga, Legend Of The Lakes, and the state's longest course is the Eden Valley Hillclimb at 3.7 km (2.3 mi).

=== New Zealand ===
Hillclimbing is a popular club event in New Zealand. However, some international competitors and foreign motor racing enthusiasts attend the premier hillclimb event on the New Zealand motor sport calendar.

Race to the Sky was based near Queenstown. Held every Easter from 1998 until 2007, it starts from the floor of the Cardrona Valley and runs uphill for 15 km (9.3 mi) through 137 corners to the top, climbing from 1,500 ft (460 m) to 5,000 ft (1,500 m) averaging a 1:11 gradient.

The driver with the greatest number of "Race to the Sky" outright wins (8) is Nobuhiro "Monster" Tajima, driving his custom-built Suzuki Escudo hillclimb special vehicle.

== Africa ==
=== South Africa ===
The best-known hillclimb event in South Africa is held annually in early May at the Knysna Speed Festival, now known as The Simola Hillclimb, founded in 2009. It is a three-day event, with Classic Car Friday reserved for cars built before 1990 and restricted to 65 entries. The King of the Hill Challenge (limited to 84 entries), for standard production and unrestricted cars in various classes, takes place over the weekend. Saturday is for practice and pre-qualifying, while Sunday features final qualifying, the class finals, and then the category shootouts. The course length is 1.9 km (1.2 mi) up Simola Hill. It is very fast with the 2018 winning average speed being 192.524 km/h (119.629 mph). There was no event in 2013 and 2020. 2020 was canceled due to COVID-19. The eleventh running of the event was held on 3-5 September 2021.

=== Kenya ===
The Kiamburing TT is an annual hillclimb event in Kenya. It is the first of its kind in East Africa and inspired by other international hillclimb events. It is a time attack event run on a closed course.

The event held in Kiambu County on October 20, 2013, brought together over 15 high-performance cars to compete in a timed race on the 18-kilometre (11 mi) Kiambu-Ndumberi road.

Some of the drivers who have competed in the Kiamburing TT include Amir Mohamed (winner 2013 Kiamburing TT Endurance event) and Kay Wachira (winner 2014 Kiamburing TT Slalom Challenge). Returning to the Kiambu motoring circuit in 2015, Mohamed died in a crash during practice.

== Motorcycle hillclimbing ==
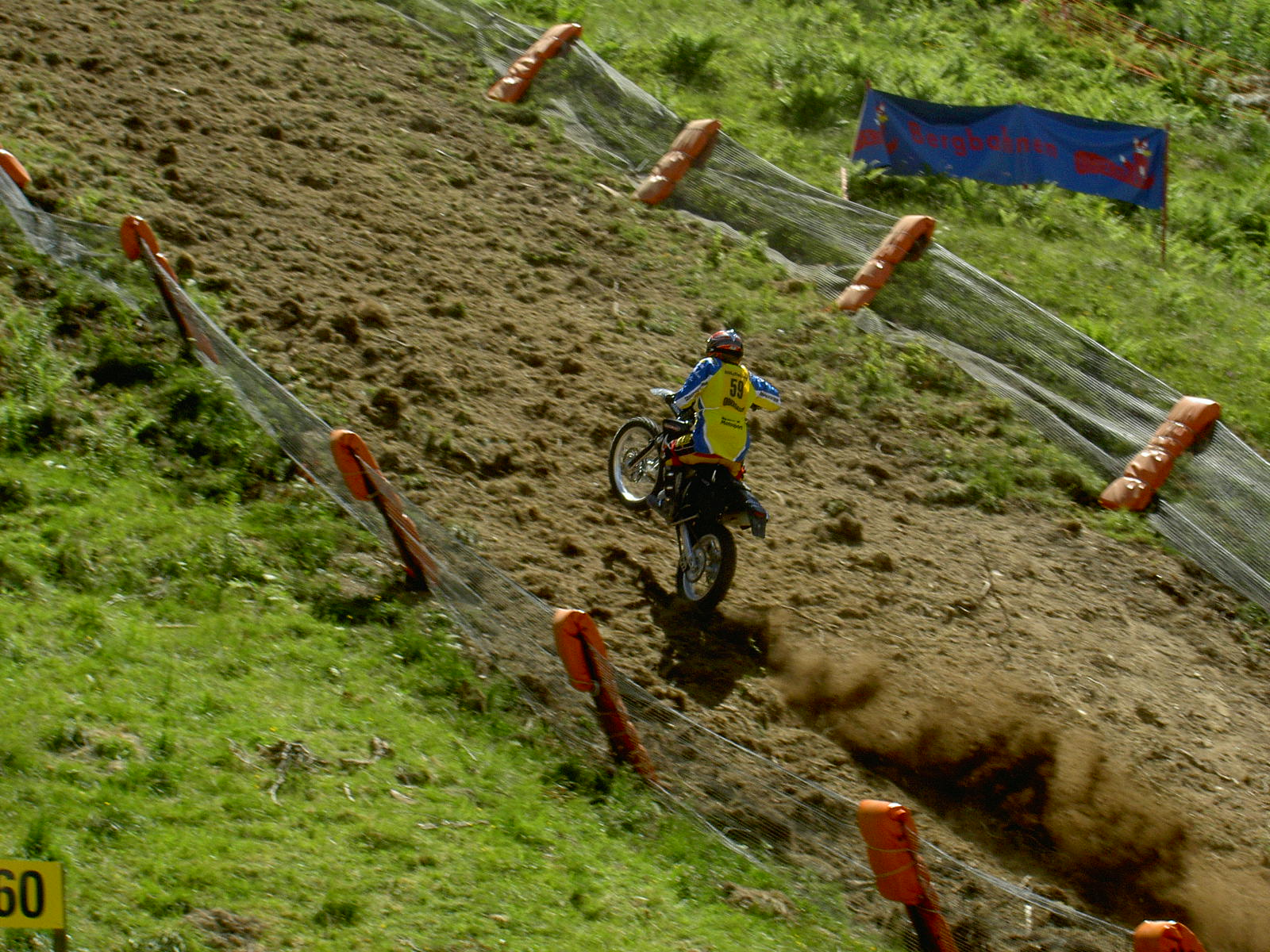
Motorcycle hillclimbing

In motorcycle hillclimbing, one competitor at a time attempts to ride up a steep dirt hill. If riders fail to complete the course, their results are judged on the distance that they manage to achieve. Of those that succeed, the rider to reach the top with the shortest elapsed time wins.

In the United States, France and Belgium, the completions are usually held on off-road courses. For years the national competitions was held at Mount Garfield near Muskegon, Michigan. The Widowmaker hill climb in Utah is also one of the most prestigious and best-known motorcycle hill climbs in the world. In the United States, the top-flight championship is the American Hillclimb, sanctioned by the AMA Pro Racing. In France, the French Motorcycling Federation (FFM) holds the French Hillclimbing Championship (Championnat de France de Montée Impossible).

The motorcycles used are often modified motocross bikes, with common modifications including lengthened swingarms and specialized rear tires, such as paddle or studded tires for increased traction. The motorcycle of choice in the early decades was the Harley-Davidson 45 cubic inch model due to its high torque at low RPM, similar to farm engines.

== See also ==
- Touge
