= Collingrove Hillclimb =

- Location: Angaston, South Australia
- Time zone: UTC+9.5 (UTC+10.5 DST)
- Coordinates: 34°33′22″S 139°6′4″E
- Opened: 1952
- Major Events: Australian Hillclimb Championship; South Australian Hillclimb Championship
- Hill Length: 750 metres (820 yd)
- Turns: 9
- Hill Record: 27.25 (Brett Hayward, Hayward, 14 September 2014)

Collingrove Hillclimb is a motor sport facility located in South Australia's Barossa Valley. It is situated approximately 7 km south of Angaston, off the Angaston — Mount Pleasant Road, and is owned and operated by the Sporting Car Club of South Australia. It has been in operation since 1952. The opening meeting was held on 15 March 1952 with J. F. Crouch in a Cooper Mark 5 setting a record for the course of 39.95 seconds.

Collingrove has regularly held Australian Hillclimb Championships and attracted some of Australia's well known motor sport competitors including Eldred Norman, Peter Hollinger, Stan Keen, Norm Beechey and more. The outright hill record is currently held by Brett Hayward driving a Hayward. Other drivers who have previously held the track record include past Australian Hillclimb Champions Kym Rohrlach (VW special), Stan Keen (Elfin) and Peter Gumley (SCV).

The track itself is 750 m of challenging asphalt, climbing nearly 70 m from the start line to the finish. Prior to the 2025 season, the club has upgraded the return road with an asphalt surface and extended the beginning of the competition track by 300m. For spectators the track offers many vantage points and picnic areas.

Each year there are Multiclub Events, the four round Wintercup series, Come & Try Days and the South Australian Hillclimb Championships.

Collingrove has hosted the Australian Hillclimb Championship on 13 occasions: 1954, 1960, 1966, 1971, 1978, 1982, 1986, 1990, 1995, 1998, 2003, 2010 and 2017.

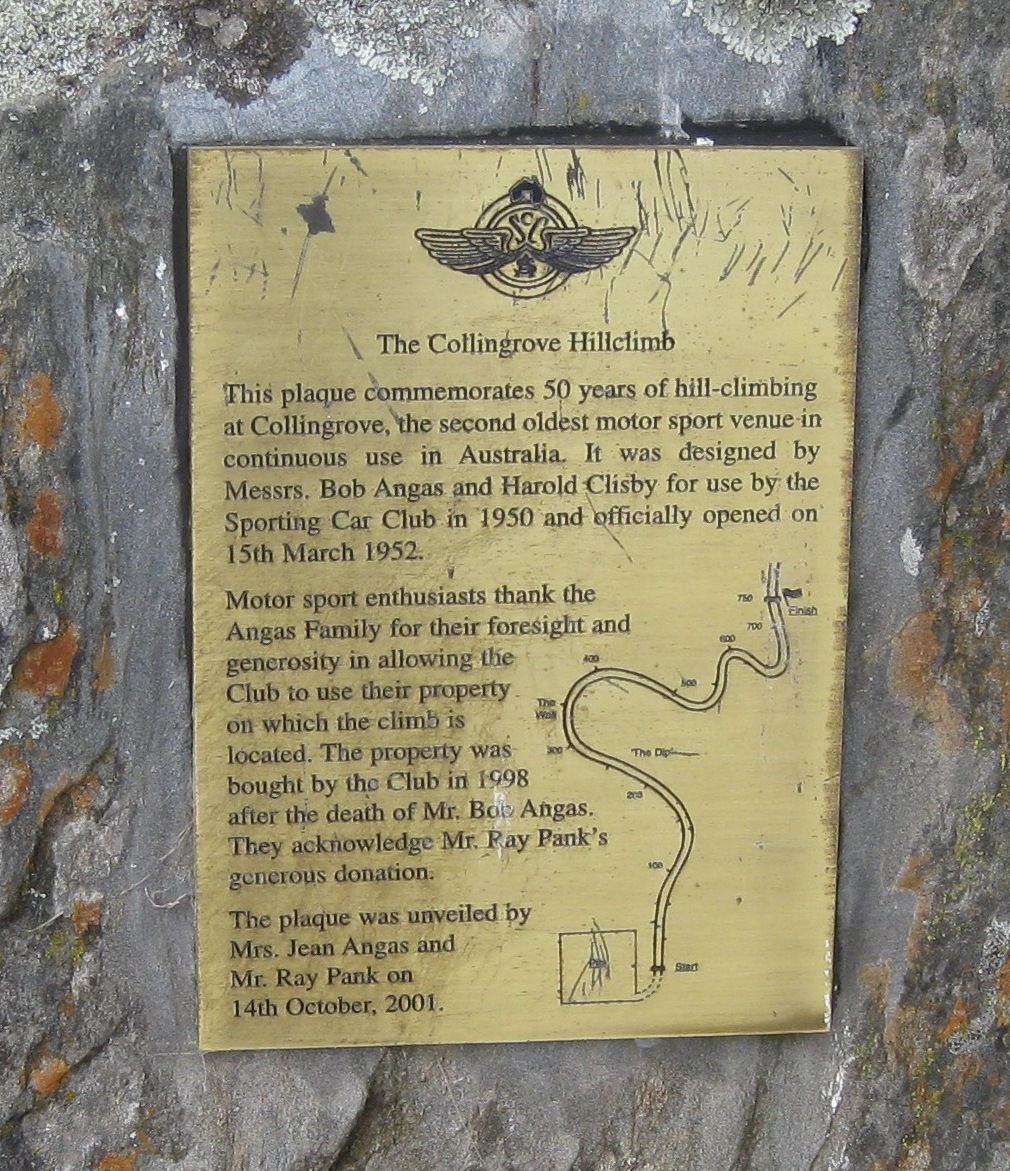
Commemorative plaque

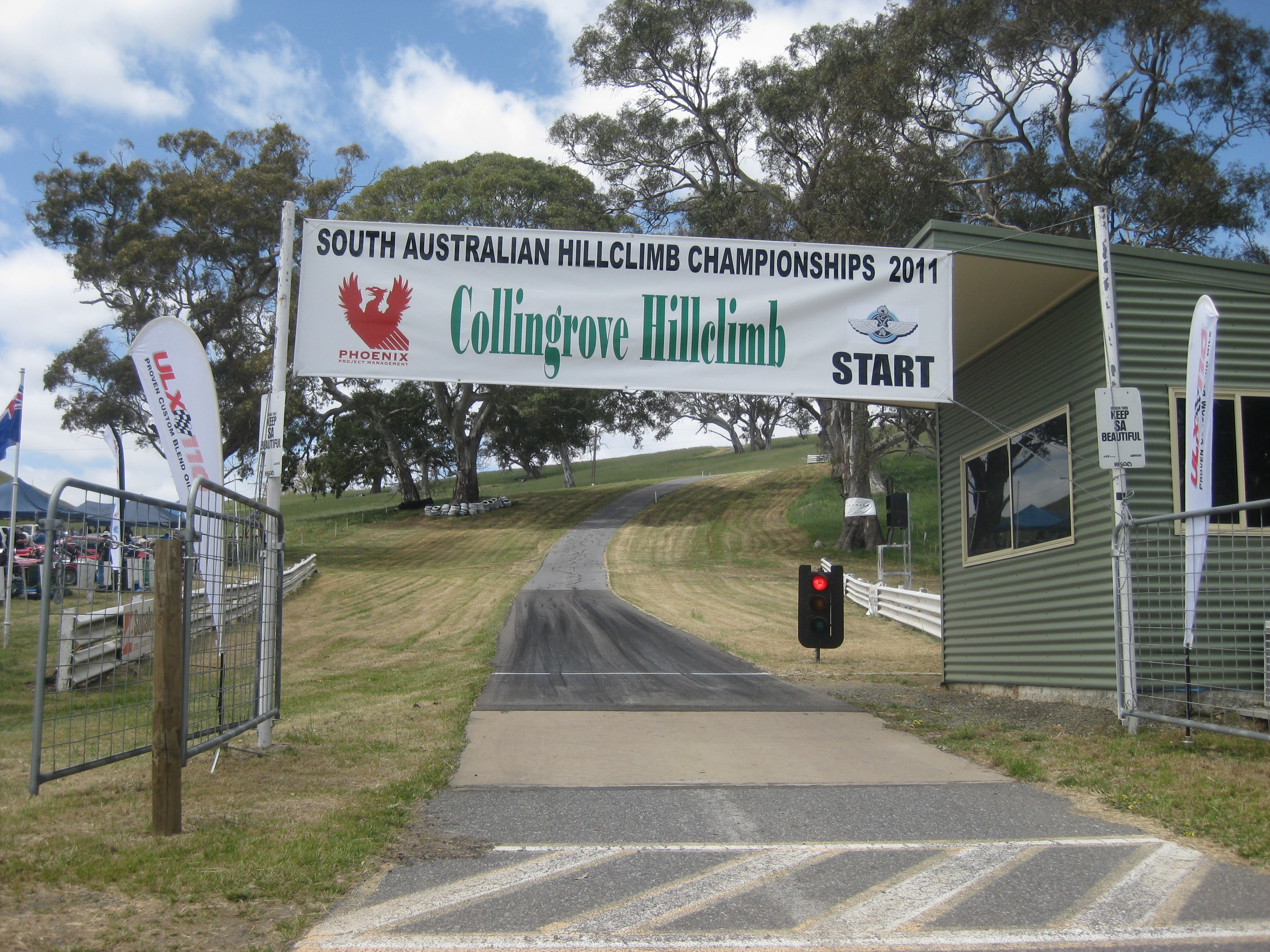
The startline (driver's view)

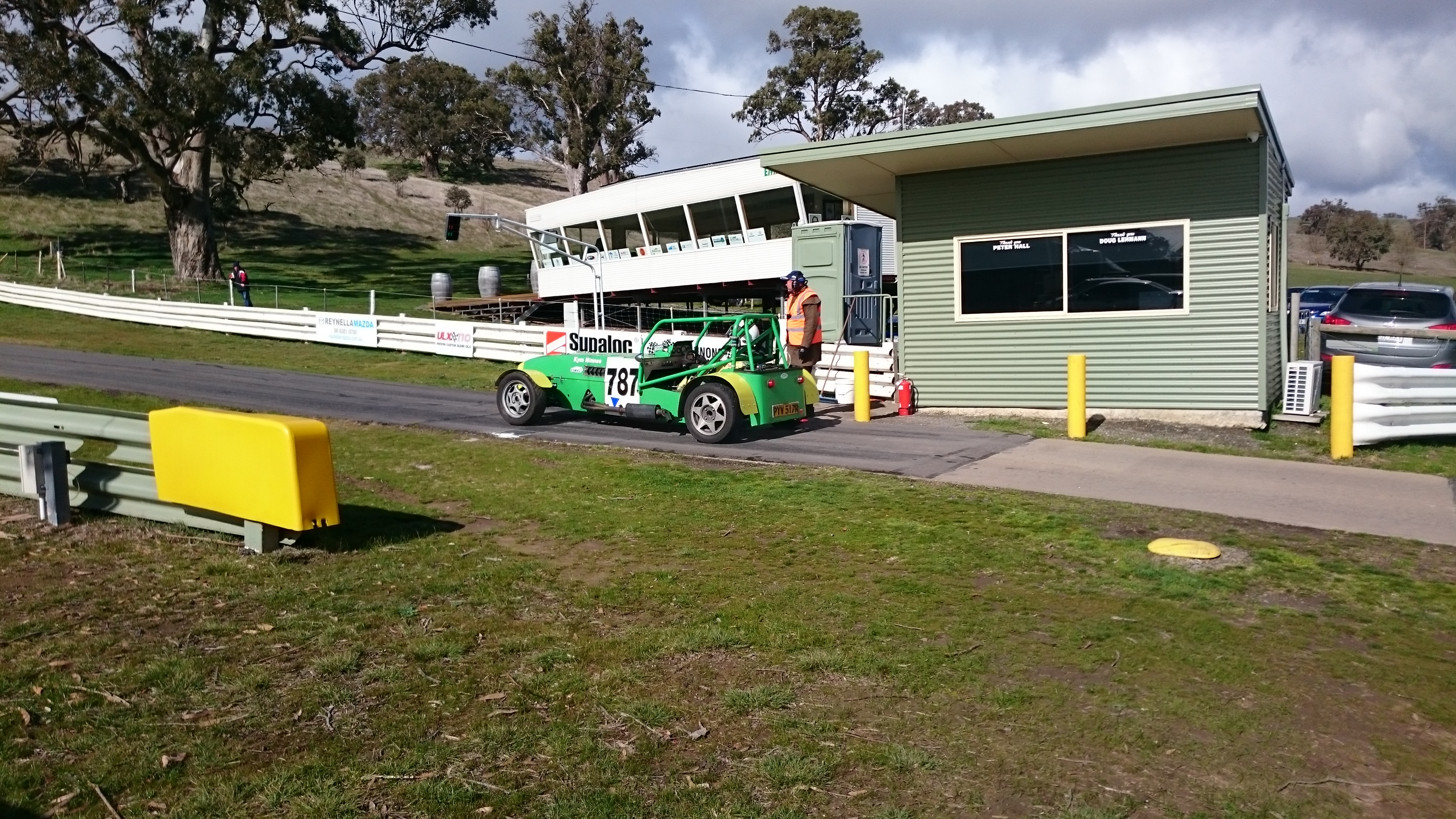
The startline (spectator view)

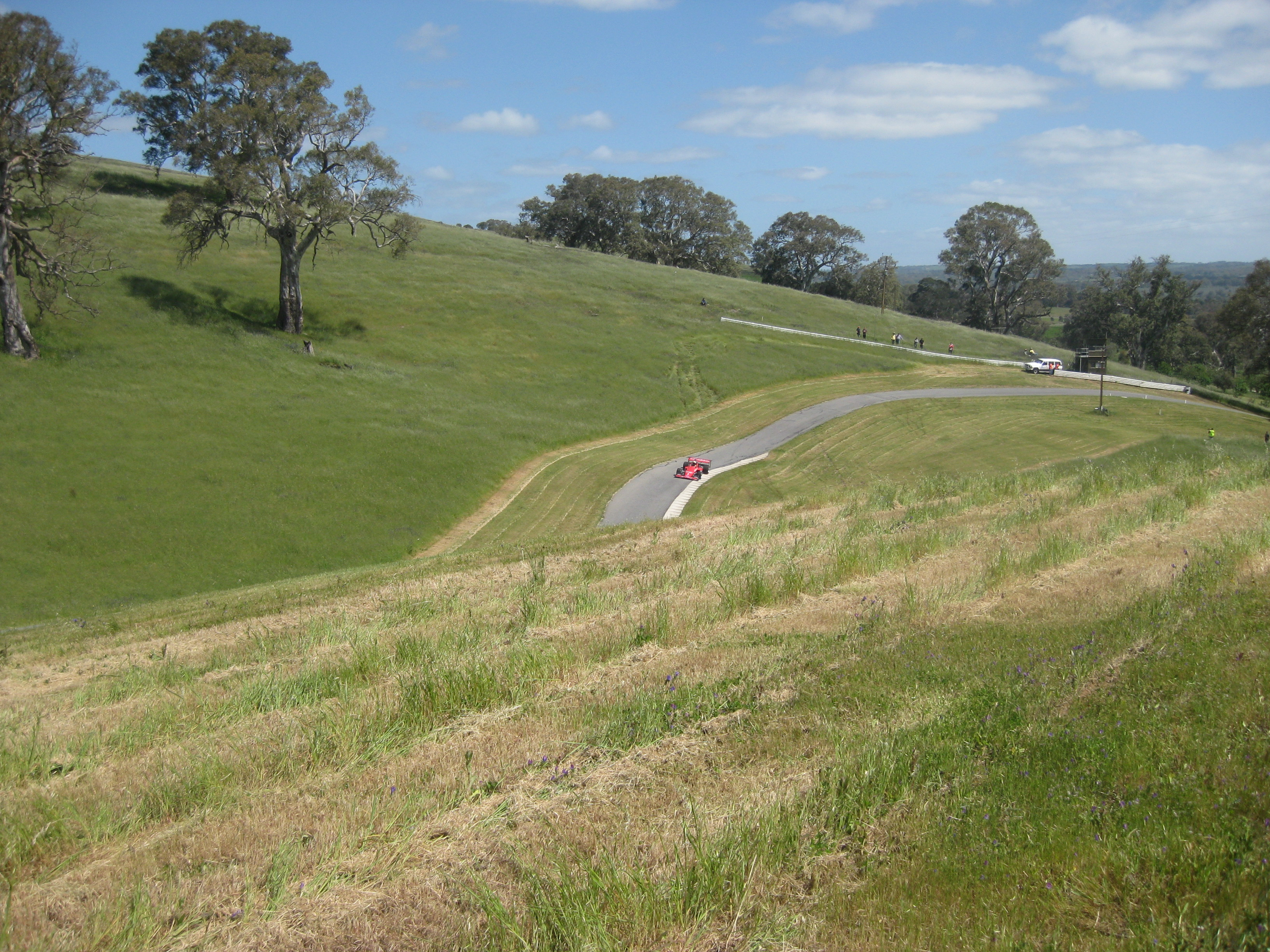
The Dip

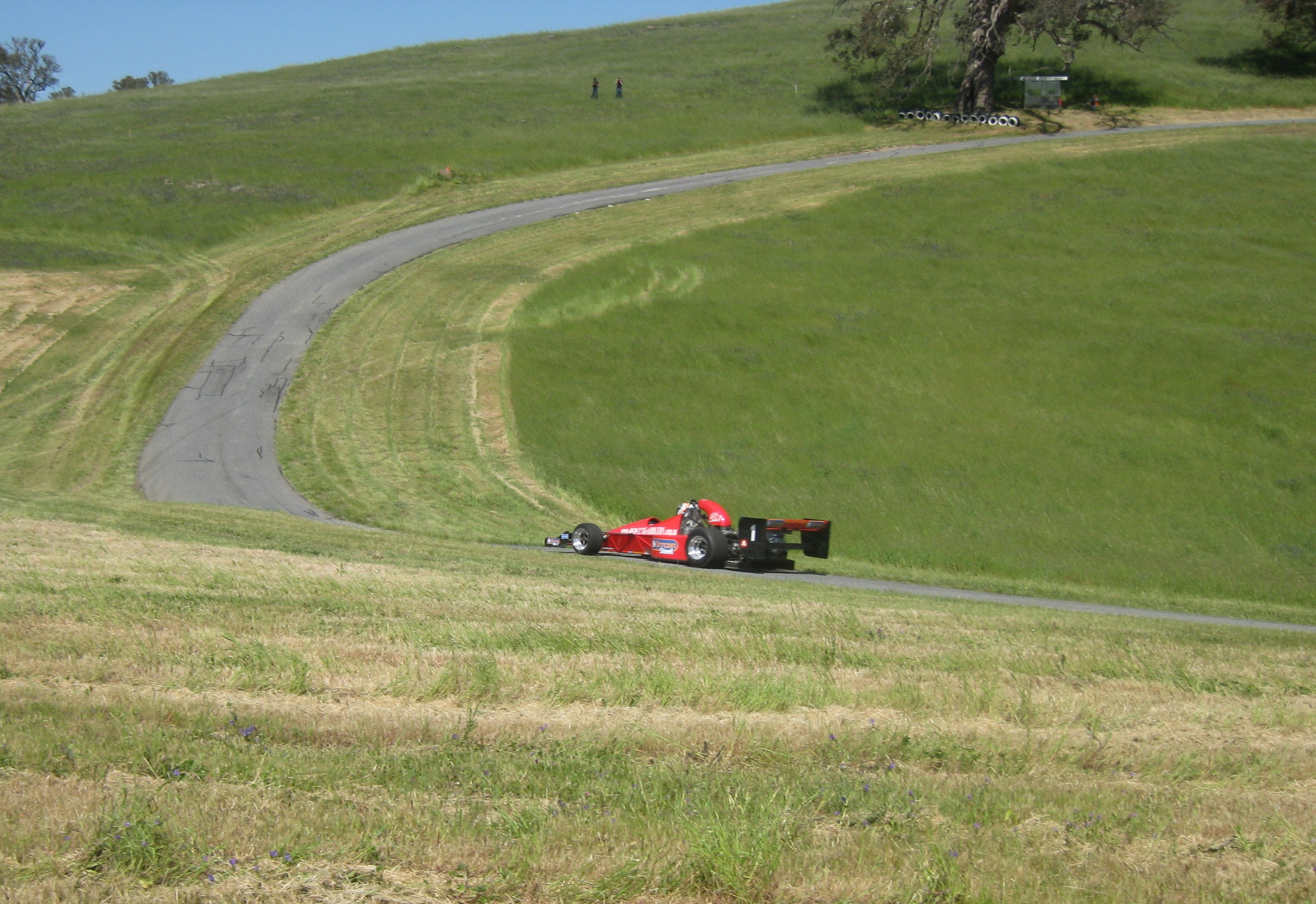
The Wall
