= Gould GR55 =

- Constructor: Gould Racing

Technical specifications
- Chassis: Carbon fiber composite monocoque
- Suspension: Double wishbones, coil springs over shock absorbers, anti-roll bars
- Engine: Mid-engine, longitudinally mounted, 2.8–3.5 L (170.9–213.6 cu in), NME XB, DOHC, 90° V8, NA, mid-engined Mid-engine, longitudinally mounted, 4.0 L (244.1 cu in), Judd EV, DOHC, 90° V8, NA, mid-engined
- Transmission: 6-speed semi-automatic sequential manual
- Power: 620–680 hp (462–507 kW)
- Weight: 475 kg (1,047 lb)

Competition history

The Gould GR55, and its evolution, the GR55B, are open-wheel race cars, designed, developed and built by British company Gould Racing, specifically for the British Sprint Championship, since 2003.
