= Malcolm Oastler =

Australian engineer

- Born: 24 April 1959 (age 67); Sydney, Australia

Malcolm Bruce Oastler (born 24 April 1959) is an Australian engineer. He was the former technical director of Formula One team BAR, former chief engineer for Jaguar Racing, and designer of many race cars.

== Career ==
Oastler was born in Sydney, Australia. A keen motorsport enthusiast and driver from a young age, he earned a first class honours degree in mechanical engineering from the New South Wales University of Technology. Oastler embarked on a driving career in the early 1980s, and was particularly successful in the Australian Formula Ford championship. Deciding to try his luck in the European motorsport scene, Oastler relocated to England in 1985, but without any real financial backimg found it very tough to campaign in any series there.

Oastler was working as a mechanic for Milldent Motorsport in Leicestershire in exchange for part-time drives in British Formula Ford 2000. In 1986, his engineering talents were recognised and he joined the Reynard company as a designer. Oastler was responsible for many designs at Reynard in racing categories such as Formula Ford, Formula Ford 2000, Formula 3000 and Indy car. Oastler's Reynard design for the first Formula 3000 series was especially strong, and his chassis design went on to win five international titles. After the Formula 3000 success, Oastler led the IndyCar design from the start of the project. His Reynard 95I chassis went on to win eight races in total, including the Indy 500 and started from pole position no less than thirteen times.

In 1998, Oastler was seconded to the newly formed BAR team in a chief designer role. As such he was responsible for all design and enhancement work done on the 1999 BAR 01 car, and also much work done on the 1998 Tyrrell 026. (BAR was founded on the remains of the Tyrrell F1 team and actually competed under the Tyrrell name for the 1998 season. The name British American Racing was first seen on the track for the 1999 season.) During the 1999 season Oastler was promoted to the role of technical director, but that role reverted to the BAR-partnered Reynard company in 2000 which left Oastler back at the chief designer position. BAR management was taken over by David Richards for 2002 and Oastler soon found himself out of the team. During that season he resurfaced at Jaguar Racing and worked on their upcoming R4 chassis for the 2002 season, and was named Jaguar's chief engineer for 2003 and 2004.

During the Jaguar F1 team's tumultuous final season in 2004, Oastler decided to retire from professional motorsport, with the team thanking him for his contribution. He has since returned to his native Australia to set up several rural ventures.

== Personal life ==
Oastler is married to Joanna and has three daughters, Charlotte, Chloe and Kate.

Oastler has maintained an interest and involvement with motorsport within Australia. This has included competing in the Australian Hillclimb Championship, a category in which he is a 5 time champion.

Oastler also shares his various engineering videos on YouTube, which regularly feature him working in his thongs.
