= Jordan Grand Prix results =

Formula One competition results 1991–2005

These are the complete Grand Prix racing results for Jordan Grand Prix.

== Complete Formula One results ==
(key)

Year	Chassis	Engine	Tyres	Drivers	1	2	3	4	5	6	7	8	9	10	11	12	13	14	15	16	17	18	19	Points	WCC
1991	191	Ford HB4 3.5 V8	G		USA	BRA	SMR	MON	CAN	MEX	FRA	GBR	GER	HUN	BEL	ITA	POR	ESP	JPN	AUS				13	5th
1991	191	Ford HB4 3.5 V8	G	(Belgium) Bertrand Gachot	10	13	Ret	8	5	Ret	Ret	6	6	9^{F}										13	5th
1991	191	Ford HB4 3.5 V8	G	(Germany) Michael Schumacher											Ret									13	5th
1991	191	Ford HB4 3.5 V8	G	(Brazil) Roberto Moreno												Ret	10							13	5th
1991	191	Ford HB4 3.5 V8	G	(Italy) Alessandro Zanardi														9	Ret	9				13	5th
1991	191	Ford HB4 3.5 V8	G	(Italy) Andrea de Cesaris	DNPQ	Ret	Ret	Ret	4	4	6	Ret	5	7	13	7	8	Ret	Ret	8				13	5th
1992	192	Yamaha OX99 3.5 V12	G		RSA	MEX	BRA	ESP	SMR	MON	CAN	FRA	GBR	GER	HUN	BEL	ITA	POR	JPN	AUS				1	11th
1992	192	Yamaha OX99 3.5 V12	G	(Italy) Stefano Modena	DNQ	Ret	Ret	DNQ	Ret	Ret	Ret	Ret	Ret	DNQ	Ret	15	DNQ	13	7	6				1	11th
1992	192	Yamaha OX99 3.5 V12	G	(Brazil) Maurício Gugelmin	11	Ret	Ret	Ret	7	Ret	Ret	Ret	Ret	15	10	14	Ret	Ret	Ret	Ret				1	11th
1993	193	Hart 1035 3.5 V10	G		RSA	BRA	EUR	SMR	ESP	MON	CAN	FRA	GBR	GER	HUN	BEL	ITA	POR	JPN	AUS				3	11th
1993	193	Hart 1035 3.5 V10	G	(Brazil) Rubens Barrichello	Ret	Ret	10	Ret	12	9	Ret	7	10	Ret	Ret	Ret	Ret	13	5	11				3	11th
1993	193	Hart 1035 3.5 V10	G	(Italy) Ivan Capelli	Ret	DNQ																		3	11th
1993	193	Hart 1035 3.5 V10	G	(Belgium) Thierry Boutsen			Ret	Ret	11	Ret	12	11	Ret	13	9	Ret								3	11th
1993	193	Hart 1035 3.5 V10	G	(Italy) Marco Apicella													Ret							3	11th
1993	193	Hart 1035 3.5 V10	G	(Italy) Emanuele Naspetti														Ret						3	11th
1993	193	Hart 1035 3.5 V10	G	(United Kingdom) Eddie Irvine															6	Ret				3	11th
1994	194	Hart 1035 3.5 V10	G		BRA	PAC	SMR	MON	ESP	CAN	FRA	GBR	GER	HUN	BEL	ITA	POR	EUR	JPN	AUS				28	5th
1994	194	Hart 1035 3.5 V10	G	(Brazil) Rubens Barrichello	4	3	DNQ	Ret	Ret	7	Ret	4	Ret	Ret	Ret^{P}	4	4	12	Ret	4				28	5th
1994	194	Hart 1035 3.5 V10	G	(United Kingdom) Eddie Irvine	Ret				6	Ret	Ret	DNS	Ret	Ret	13	Ret	7	4	5	Ret				28	5th
1994	194	Hart 1035 3.5 V10	G	(Japan) Aguri Suzuki		Ret																		28	5th
1994	194	Hart 1035 3.5 V10	G	(Italy) Andrea de Cesaris			Ret	4																28	5th
1995	195	Peugeot A10 3.0 V10	G		BRA	ARG	SMR	ESP	MON	CAN	FRA	GBR	GER	HUN	BEL	ITA	POR	EUR	PAC	JPN	AUS			21	6th
1995	195	Peugeot A10 3.0 V10	G	(Brazil) Rubens Barrichello	Ret	Ret	Ret	7	Ret	2	6	11	Ret	7	6	Ret	11	4	Ret	Ret	Ret			21	6th
1995	195	Peugeot A10 3.0 V10	G	(United Kingdom) Eddie Irvine	Ret	Ret	8	5	Ret	3	9	Ret	9	13	Ret	Ret	10	6	11	4	Ret			21	6th
1996	196	Peugeot A12 EV5 3.0 V10	G		AUS	BRA	ARG	EUR	SMR	MON	ESP	CAN	FRA	GBR	GER	HUN	BEL	ITA	POR	JPN				22	5th
1996	196	Peugeot A12 EV5 3.0 V10	G	(Brazil) Rubens Barrichello	Ret	Ret	4	5	5	Ret	Ret	Ret	9	4	6	6	Ret	5	Ret	9				22	5th
1996	196	Peugeot A12 EV5 3.0 V10	G	(United Kingdom) Martin Brundle	Ret	12	Ret	6	Ret	Ret	Ret	6	8	6	10	Ret	Ret	4	9	5				22	5th
1997	197	Peugeot A14 3.0 V10	G		AUS	BRA	ARG	SMR	MON	ESP	CAN	FRA	GBR	GER	HUN	BEL	ITA	AUT	LUX	JPN	EUR			33	5th
1997	197	Peugeot A14 3.0 V10	G	(Germany) Ralf Schumacher	Ret	Ret	3	Ret	Ret	Ret	Ret	6	5	5	5	Ret	Ret	5	Ret	9	Ret			33	5th
1997	197	Peugeot A14 3.0 V10	G	(Italy) Giancarlo Fisichella	Ret	8	Ret	4	6	9^{F}	3	9	7	11	Ret	2	4	4	Ret	7	11			33	5th
1998	198	Mugen-Honda MF-301 HC 3.0 V10	G		AUS	BRA	ARG	SMR	ESP	MON	CAN	FRA	GBR	AUT	GER	HUN	BEL	ITA	LUX	JPN				34	4th
1998	198	Mugen-Honda MF-301 HC 3.0 V10	G	(United Kingdom) Damon Hill	8	DSQ	8	10	Ret	8	Ret	Ret	Ret	7	4	4	1	6	9	4				34	4th
1998	198	Mugen-Honda MF-301 HC 3.0 V10	G	(Germany) Ralf Schumacher	Ret	Ret	Ret	7	11	Ret	Ret	16	6	5	6	9	2	3	Ret	Ret				34	4th
1999	199	Mugen-Honda MF-301 HD 3.0 V10	B		AUS	BRA	SMR	MON	ESP	CAN	FRA	GBR	AUT	GER	HUN	BEL	ITA	EUR	MAL	JPN				61	3rd
1999	199	Mugen-Honda MF-301 HD 3.0 V10	B	(United Kingdom) Damon Hill	Ret	Ret	4	Ret	7	Ret	Ret	5	8	Ret	6	6	10	Ret	Ret	Ret				61	3rd
1999	199	Mugen-Honda MF-301 HD 3.0 V10	B	(Germany) Heinz-Harald Frentzen	2	3	Ret	4	Ret	11	1	4	4	3	4	3	1	Ret^{P}	6	4				61	3rd
2000	EJ10; EJ10B	Mugen-Honda MF-301 HE 3.0 V10	B		AUS	BRA	SMR	GBR	ESP	EUR	MON	CAN	FRA	AUT	GER	HUN	BEL	ITA	USA	JPN	MAL			17	6th
2000	EJ10; EJ10B	Mugen-Honda MF-301 HE 3.0 V10	B	(Germany) Heinz-Harald Frentzen	Ret	3	Ret	17	6	Ret	10	Ret	7	Ret	Ret	6	6	Ret	3	Ret	Ret			17	6th
2000	EJ10; EJ10B	Mugen-Honda MF-301 HE 3.0 V10	B	(Italy) Jarno Trulli	Ret	4	15	6	12	Ret	Ret	6	6	Ret	9	7	Ret	Ret	Ret	13	12			17	6th
2001	EJ11	Honda RA001E 3.0 V10	B		AUS	MAL	BRA	SMR	ESP	AUT	MON	CAN	EUR	FRA	GBR	GER	HUN	BEL	ITA	USA	JPN			19	5th
2001	EJ11	Honda RA001E 3.0 V10	B	(Germany) Heinz-Harald Frentzen	5	4	11	6	Ret	Ret	Ret	WD	Ret	8	7									19	5th
2001	EJ11	Honda RA001E 3.0 V10	B	(Brazil) Ricardo Zonta								7				Ret								19	5th
2001	EJ11	Honda RA001E 3.0 V10	B	(France) Jean Alesi													10	6	8	7	Ret			19	5th
2001	EJ11	Honda RA001E 3.0 V10	B	(Italy) Jarno Trulli	Ret	8	5	5	4	DSQ	Ret	11	Ret	5	Ret	Ret	Ret	Ret	Ret	4	8			19	5th
2002	EJ12	Honda RA002E 3.0 V10	B		AUS	MAL	BRA	SMR	ESP	AUT	MON	CAN	EUR	GBR	FRA	GER	HUN	BEL	ITA	USA	JPN			9	6th
2002	EJ12	Honda RA002E 3.0 V10	B	(Italy) Giancarlo Fisichella	Ret	13	Ret	Ret	Ret	5	5	5	Ret	7	DNQ	Ret	6	Ret	8	7	Ret			9	6th
2002	EJ12	Honda RA002E 3.0 V10	B	(Japan) Takuma Sato	Ret	9	9	Ret	Ret	Ret	Ret	10	16	Ret	Ret	8	10	11	12	11	5			9	6th
2003	EJ13	Ford RS1 3.0 V10	B		AUS	MAL	BRA	SMR	ESP	AUT	MON	CAN	EUR	FRA	GBR	GER	HUN	ITA	USA	JPN				13	9th
2003	EJ13	Ford RS1 3.0 V10	B	(Italy) Giancarlo Fisichella	12	Ret	1	15	Ret	Ret	10	Ret	12	Ret	Ret	13	Ret	10	7	Ret				13	9th
2003	EJ13	Ford RS1 3.0 V10	B	(Republic of Ireland) Ralph Firman	Ret	10	Ret	Ret	8	11	12	Ret	11	15	13	Ret			Ret	14				13	9th
2003	EJ13	Ford RS1 3.0 V10	B	(Hungary) Zsolt Baumgartner													Ret	11						13	9th
2004	EJ14	Ford RS2 3.0 V10	B		AUS	MAL	BHR	SMR	ESP	MON	EUR	CAN	USA	FRA	GBR	GER	HUN	BEL	ITA	CHN	JPN	BRA		5	9th
2004	EJ14	Ford RS2 3.0 V10	B	(Germany) Nick Heidfeld	Ret	Ret	15	Ret	Ret	7	10	8	Ret	16	15	Ret	12	11	14	13	13	Ret		5	9th
2004	EJ14	Ford RS2 3.0 V10	B	(Italy) Giorgio Pantano	14	13	16	Ret	Ret	Ret	13		Ret	17	Ret	15	Ret	Ret	Ret					5	9th
2004	EJ14	Ford RS2 3.0 V10	B	(Germany) Timo Glock								7								15	15	15		5	9th
2005	EJ15; EJ15B	Toyota RVX-05 3.0 V10	B		AUS	MAL	BHR	SMR	ESP	MON	EUR	CAN	USA	FRA	GBR	GER	HUN	TUR	ITA	BEL	BRA	JPN	CHN	12	9th
2005	EJ15; EJ15B	Toyota RVX-05 3.0 V10	B	(Portugal) Tiago Monteiro	16	12	10	13	12	13	15	10	3	13	17	17	13	15	17	8	Ret	13	11	12	9th
2005	EJ15; EJ15B	Toyota RVX-05 3.0 V10	B	(India) Narain Karthikeyan	15	11	Ret	12	13	Ret	16	Ret	4	15	Ret	16	12	14	20	11	15	15	Ret	12	9th

== Complete International Formula 3000 results ==
(key) (Races in bold indicate pole position; races in italics indicate fastest lap)

Year	Drivers	1	2	3	4	5	6	7	8	9	10	11
1985		SIL	THR	EST	VAL	PAU	SPA	DIJ	PER	ZEL	ZAN	DON
1985	(Belgium) Thierry Tassin			Ret			Ret	Ret		6	8	Ret
1986		SIL	VAL	PAU	SPA	IMO	MUG	PER	ZEL	BIR	BUG	JAR
1986	(United Kingdom) Russell Spence	18^{†}	DNQ	Ret	15	Ret	DNQ	Ret				
1986	(United Kingdom) Kenny Acheson								Ret			
1986	(Republic of Ireland) Tommy Byrne									15		
1986	(Netherlands) Jan Lammers										11	
1986	(Switzerland) Bernard Santal											DNQ
1986	(Belgium) Thierry Tassin	22^{†}										
1986	(Austria) Pierre Chauvet		Ret	DNQ	Ret	Ret	18		DNQ		14	Ret
1986	(Italy) Alessandro Santin							8				
1986	(United States) Ross Cheever									DNQ		
1987		SIL	VAL	SPA	PAU	DON	PER	BRH	BIR	IMO	BUG	JAR
1987	(Sweden) Tomas Kaiser	13	9	DNQ	Ret	Ret	DNQ					
1988		JER	VAL	PAU	SIL	MON	PER	BRH	BIR	BUG	ZOL	DIJ
1988	(United Kingdom) Johnny Herbert	**1**	Ret		7	3	Ret	**Ret**				
1988	(Italy) Paolo Barilla									Ret	Ret	7
1988	(Sweden) Thomas Danielsson	Ret	Ret	DNS	8	Ret						
1988	(Italy) Alessandro Santin						11					
1988	(United Kingdom) Martin Donnelly							1	2	2	**Ret**	1
1989		SIL	VAL	PAU	JER	PER	BRH	BIR	SPA	BUG	DIJ	
1989	(United Kingdom) Martin Donnelly	Ret	**DSQ**	Ret	Ret	Ret	1	3	Ret	7	17	
1989	(France) Jean Alesi	4	Ret	1	5	**Ret**	2	**1**	1	6		
1989	(Sweden) Rickard Rydell										Ret	
1990		DON	SIL	PAU	JER	MNZ	PER	HOC	BRH	BIR	BUG	NOG
1990	(Italy) Emanuele Naspetti	Ret	10	Ret		Ret	Ret	Ret	Ret	6	DNQ	
1990	(Italy) Vincenzo Sospiri				8							DNQ
1990	(United Kingdom) Eddie Irvine	Ret	6	Ret	DNS	2	4	1	**3**	Ret	3	Ret
1990	(Germany) Heinz-Harald Frentzen	Ret	Ret	Ret	17	Ret	5	6	7	Ret	Ret	DNQ
1991		VAL	PAU	JER	MUG	PER	HOC	BRH	SPA	BUG	NOG	
1991	(United Kingdom) Damon Hill	4	Ret	8	Ret	11	Ret	6	Ret	4	3	
1991	(Italy) Vincenzo Sospiri	Ret	DNQ	15	4	Ret	2	16	10	Ret	13	
