= Eddie Irvine =

Racing driver (born 1965)

- Irvine at the 1994 24 Hours of Le Mans
- Born: Edmund Irvine Jr. 10 November 1965 (age 61); Newtownards, County Down, Northern Ireland
- Children: 1

Formula One World Championship career
- Nationality: (United Kingdom) British
- Active years: 1993–2002
- Team(s): Jordan, Ferrari, Jaguar
- Entries: 148 (145 starts)
- Championships: 0
- Wins: 4
- Podiums: 26
- Career points: 191
- Pole positions: 0
- Fastest laps: 1
- First entry: 1993 Japanese Grand Prix
- First win: 1999 Australian Grand Prix
- Last win: 1999 Malaysian Grand Prix
- Last entry: 2002 Japanese Grand Prix

24 Hours of Le Mans career
- Years: 1992–1994
- Teams: Toyota, SARD
- Best finish: 2nd (1994)
- Class wins: 1 (1994)

Awards
- 1999 1999: Autosport British Competition Driver of the Year; Hawthorn Memorial Trophy

Edmund "Eddie" Irvine Jr. (/ˈɜːrvaɪn/; born 10 November 1965) is a former racing driver from Northern Ireland who competed under the British flag in Formula One from 1993 to 2002. Irvine was runner-up in the Formula One World Drivers' Championship in 1999 with Ferrari, and won four Grands Prix across ten seasons.

Irvine began his career at the age of 17 when he entered Formula Ford, achieving early success, before progressing to the Formula Three and Formula 3000 Championships. He made his Formula One debut in 1993 with Jordan Grand Prix, where he achieved early notoriety for his involvement in incidents on and off the track. He scored his first podium in 1995 with Jordan, before moving to Ferrari in 1996. His most successful season was in 1999 when he took four victories and finished second in the World Championship, two points behind McLaren driver Mika Häkkinen. In his four years with Ferrari, he also finished fourth overall in 1998 and scored 22 podiums. He moved to Jaguar Racing in 2000, scoring the team's first podium in 2001 and his final podium in 2002. Irvine retired from competitive motorsport at the end of the 2002 season. As of 2024, Irvine jointly holds the record with four drivers (Lando Norris, Mika Häkkinen, Jean Alesi and Patrick Depailler) for scoring the most podiums before winning a Grand Prix (15).

Since retiring, Irvine became a media personality in Great Britain. He was linked with the takeover of the Jordan and Minardi Formula One teams in 2005 but talks came to nothing. Irvine also expanded his interests in the property market, having built up an investment portfolio during his racing career.

== Early life and career ==
Irvine was born on 10 November 1965 in Newtownards, County Down Northern Ireland, to Edmund Sr. and Kathleen. He grew up in the village of Conlig and was educated at Regent House Grammar School in Newtownards. He has one older sister, Sonia, who acted as Irvine's physiotherapist until 1999. Irvine's first taste of motorsport came when his family spent their holidays attending the British Grand Prix. His father also raced in single-seaters for fun. His childhood hero was countryman John Watson.

Eddie Irvine at the 1989 Macau Grand Prix. His helmet design was based on that of Ayrton Senna.

Irvine first competed with racing cars in 1983. He was initially interested in motorcycle racing, but his parents thought the sport too dangerous and was encouraged by his father to race in Formula Ford. Irvine worked unpaid in his father's scrapyard, in return for which, his father funded his racing hobby. He won his first race at Brands Hatch in 1984, and an award for best driver. In 1987, he joined the Van Diemen team and won the Esso Formula Ford series, the RAC Formula Ford series, and the Formula Ford Festival.

In the winter of 1987, Marlboro organised a test in which the fastest driver would be offered a drive for the following British Formula 3 season. Irvine was that driver and joined West Surrey Racing for 1988. It was a season without any success and Irvine ended it in fifth place. He raced at the Macau Grand Prix for the first time and started the race from pole position, but failed to finish. In 1989 Irvine competed in the International Formula 3000 Championship with Pacific Racing. Irvine finished the season in ninth place, ahead of teammate JJ Lehto in thirteenth, who was then considered to be a promising young driver.

In 1990, Irvine joined the Jordan Formula 3000 team. He won in Germany and ended the season in third place, beating his teammates Heinz-Harald Frentzen and Emanuele Naspetti. Irvine finished on the podium at both the Macau Grand Prix and the Fuji F3 Cup. At the end of the season, Irvine moved to Japan to compete in that country's Formula 3000 championship. In 1991, he raced for Cerumo Racing and won one race and amassed 14 points to finish seventh in the Drivers' Championship.

Irvine's first race at the 24 Hours of Le Mans was in 1992 driving a SARD Toyota Group C car alongside Roland Ratzenberger and Eje Elgh. The team finished ninth overall and came second in the Group C class.

== Formula One career ==
=== Jordan (1993–1995) ===
==== 1993 ====
Irvine made his Formula One debut in the penultimate race of the season, the Japanese Grand Prix, partnering Rubens Barrichello at the Jordan Grand Prix team. He made an immediate impact, not only by scoring a point with sixth place, but by unlapping himself against race leader, and subsequent winner, Ayrton Senna. After the race, Senna, angry at what he perceived to be "unprofessional" driving, approached Irvine in the Jordan hospitality unit, and following an altercation, threw a punch at Irvine, for which he received a suspended two-race ban. Irvine retired from the final race in Australia with accident damage. After two races, Irvine finished 22nd in the Drivers' Championship with his sole point.

Irvine raced at the 24 Hours of Le Mans for the second time, driving a Toyota Group C car alongside Toshio Suzuki and Masanori Sekiya. The team finished fourth overall.

==== 1994 ====
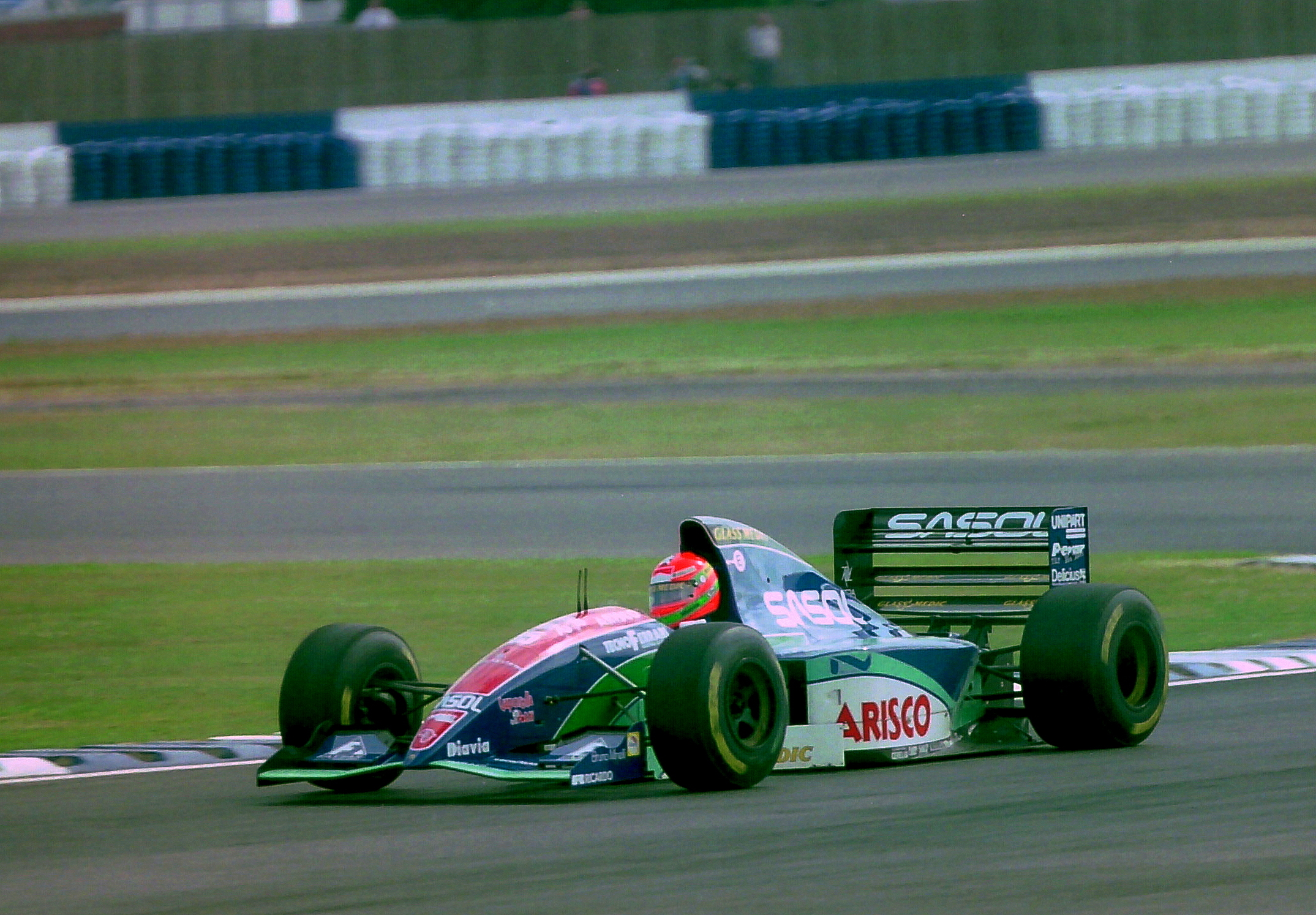
Irvine driving for Jordan during the 1994 British Grand Prix.

Irvine remained at Jordan for 1994 and was again partnered by Barrichello. At the opening round in Brazil, Irvine was involved in a four car crash. He later received a one-race ban and a $10,000 fine by the race stewards. Irvine appealed to the FIA against the decision, but his appeal was rejected on 6 April, and the penalty increased to a three-race ban. His seat was filled by Aguri Suzuki for the following Pacific Grand Prix, and Andrea de Cesaris for the races in San Marino and Monaco.

Irvine returned for the Spanish Grand Prix where he scored his first points of the season with sixth place. Five consecutive retirements followed, and he was unable to finish the Belgian Grand Prix due to an alternator failure, although he was classified 13th due to having completed over 90% of the race distance. Irvine retired from the Italian Grand Prix due to an engine failure and was later given a one-race ban, suspended for three races, for an incident with Team Lotus driver Johnny Herbert on the opening lap.

Irvine garnered further controversy during the first qualifying session of the Portuguese Grand Prix when he clipped Williams driver Damon Hill. Hill's car flipped upside down, but he escaped unhurt. Irvine was warned a similar incident would see his Super Licence revoked. He took consecutive points scoring finishes in the next two races—fourth at the European Grand Prix and fifth at the Japanese Grand Prix. Irvine retired from the season closing race in Australia when he spun off. He finished the year 16th in the Drivers' Championship, with six points.

Outside of Formula One, Irvine participated in his third consecutive 24 Hours of Le Mans as a substitute for the late Roland Ratzenberger, who died after crashing in qualifying for the 1994 San Marino Grand Prix, driving for SARD alongside Mauro Martini and Jeff Krosnoff. The team were leading with 90 minutes to go when a gearbox issue forced the car to slow, costing them victory. They finished second overall and first in the LMP1/C90 class.

==== 1995 ====
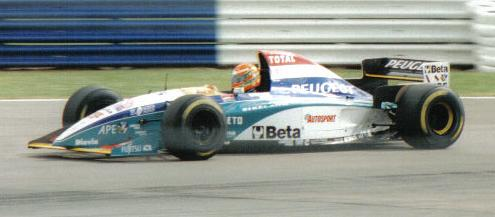
Irvine driving for Jordan at the 1995 British Grand Prix

Irvine remained at Jordan for 1995 and was again partnered by Barrichello. It was a bad start: Irvine was forced into retirement at the opening race, in Brazil, due to a gearbox actuator problem. In the following race in Argentina he was involved in a first-lap collision with McLaren driver Mika Häkkinen, and retired with an engine failure after only six laps. He finished eighth at the San Marino Grand Prix, and scored points with a fifth-place finish in Spain. Irvine secured the first podium of his Formula One career with third place in Canada. At the Belgian Grand Prix, his car caught fire during a pitstop as the fuel valve was jammed open, and although uninjured, he was forced to retire from the race.

In the week before the European Grand Prix, Jordan announced that Irvine would be retained on a two-year contract. However, Ferrari then announced that it had bought out Irvine's contract, and that he would be partnering Michael Schumacher at the team for 1996. He fared well in the race by finishing sixth, although he finished outside the points in the Pacific Grand Prix. Irvine scored his final points of the season with a fifth in Japan, and finished the season with a retirement in Australia, due to pneumatic pressure. He finished the year 12th in the Drivers' Championship with ten points.

=== Ferrari (1996–1999) ===
==== 1996 ====
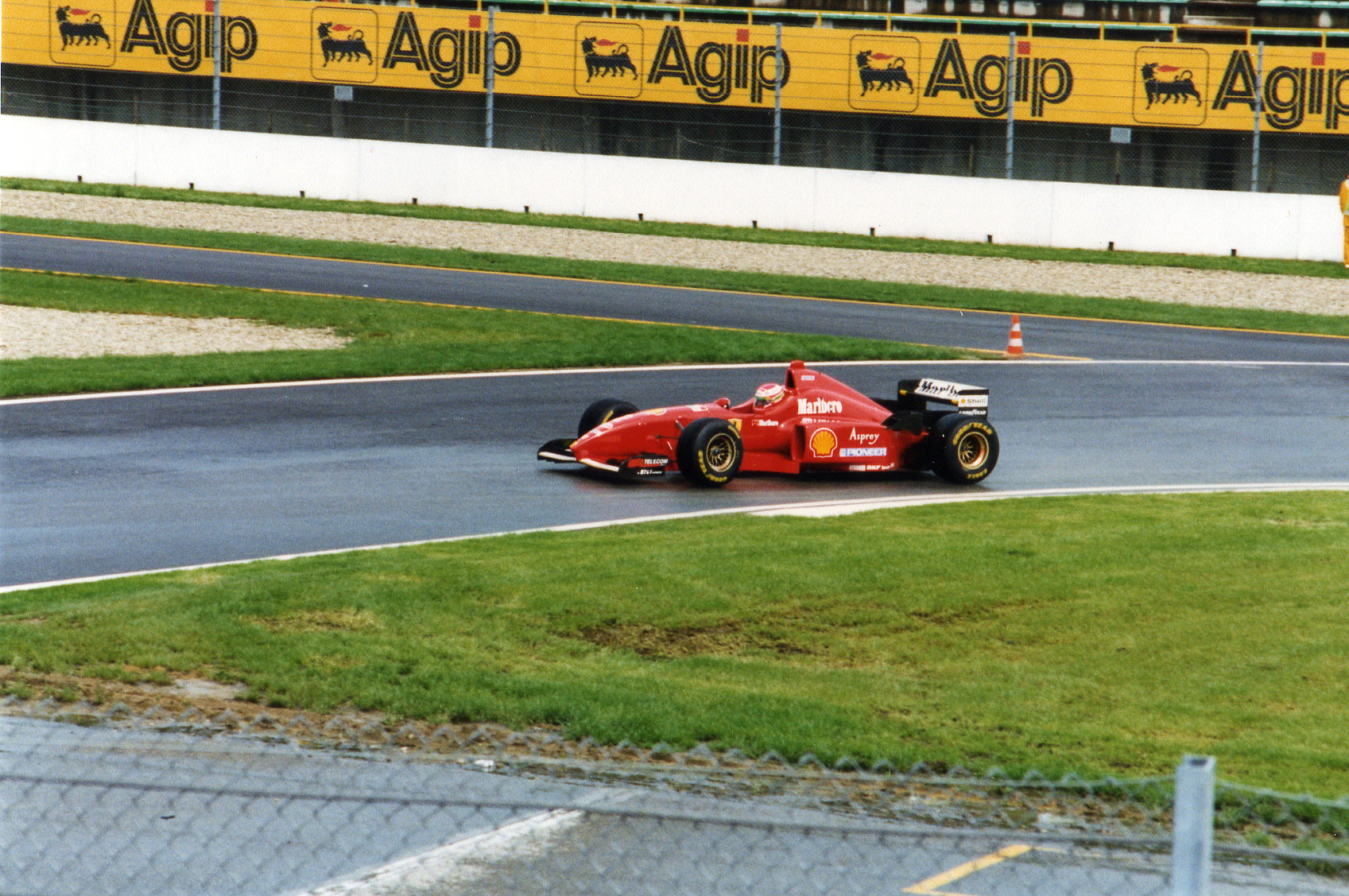
Irvine driving for Ferrari at the 1996 San Marino Grand Prix.

At the season opener in Australia, Irvine finished in third place, where he started, after out-qualifying new teammate, and then double World Champion, Michael Schumacher. At the following race in Brazil he finished outside the points in seventh position, and took fifth in Argentina. At the European Grand Prix he was involved in an incident with Olivier Panis, resulting in both drivers retiring from the race. Fourth place in the San Marino Grand Prix preceded eight consecutive retirements, due to unreliability or being involved in racing incidents. Irvine finished the Portuguese Grand Prix in fifth, but retired again from the final race of the season at Suzuka. Irvine finished tenth in the Drivers' Championship with 11 points.

==== 1997 ====
The first race of the season in Australia saw Irvine involved in a race ending first lap crash with Williams driver Jacques Villeneuve. Two races later, he finished a career high second place in Argentina, where Irvine challenged Villeneuve for the lead, who was suffering with a stomach ailment, and his car with brake problems. The result ended demands in the Italian press for Irvine to be sacked. Two consecutive third places in San Marino and Monaco, gave Irvine his best string of finishes to date. At the Spanish Grand Prix, Irvine finished only twelfth and was given a ten-second stop-go penalty, after he held up Olivier Panis and Jean Alesi when running a lap down.

At the Canadian Grand Prix Irvine was involved in another first lap incident, this time with McLaren driver Mika Häkkinen. He was back on the podium with third place at the French Grand Prix, before a run of seven races where he was either out of the points or out of the race. During the summer, it was announced that Irvine would remain at Ferrari for 1998. His run of poor results ended with a third-place finish at the Japanese Grand Prix, and he concluded the season with a fifth place at the European Grand Prix. Irvine finished seventh in the Drivers' Championship with 24 points.

==== 1998 ====
Irvine remained at Ferrari for 1998 and was again partnered with Schumacher. Irvine's fitness level was placed in doubt when he suffered from back pain. To combat the issue, a new seat was installed in his car. Irvine had very little running in the new Ferrari F300 during pre-season testing, and was concerned with the tyre war between Goodyear, Ferrari's tyre supplier, and Bridgestone, but was nevertheless confident about his chances over the coming season. At the first race of the season in Australia Irvine finished in fourth, and in the following race in Brazil, outside the points in eighth place. Irvine finished on the podium six times in the next seven races, including a second-place finish in France, behind teammate Schumacher.

In July, it was announced Irvine had signed a two-year extension to his contract. The contract stipulated that Irvine was permitted to choose his own strategy and setup, although he would remain in a supporting role to Schumacher. After two retirements in the next three races, Irvine finished the season with three points scoring finishes, including two second places in Italy and Japan. Irvine finished the season fourth in the Drivers' Championship with 47 points.

==== 1999 ====
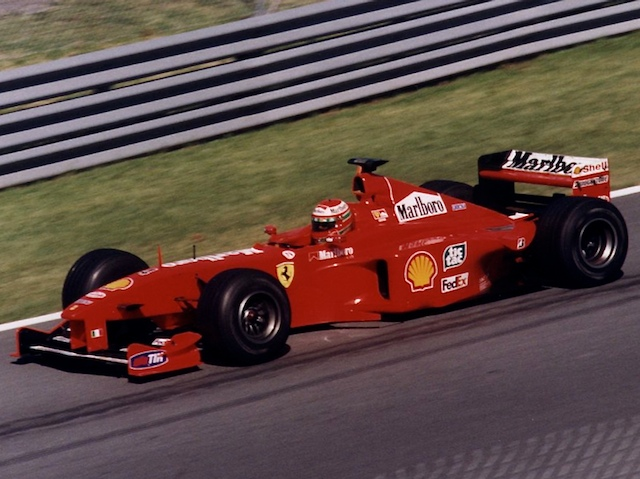
Irvine driving for Ferrari at the 1999 Canadian Grand Prix

For 1999, Irvine was confident heading into the season, saying: "After last year's results where I got my best ever championship finish with fourth place overall, now, for this year, I want to do even better". His season got off to a good start: after 81 Grand Prix, Irvine scored his maiden Formula One victory at the season opening round in Australia, giving him the lead of the World Drivers' Championship for the first time. In the following race in Brazil, an unscheduled pitstop, due to blocked radiators, cost Irvine a podium finish, and he ultimately finished fifth. Three weeks later in the San Marino Grand Prix, Irvine would miss out on another podium finish, after his car suffered an engine failure on lap 47 (of 62) while in a comfortable third place, losing him the lead of the Drivers' Championship to teammate Schumacher. Irvine finished second at Monaco and set the fastest lap (his career one and only) and survived a collision with McLaren driver David Coulthard on the way to a third-place finish in Canada.

On the first lap of the British Grand Prix, which Irvine finished in second place, Schumacher broke his right leg in a crash at the high-speed Stowe Corner when his car's rear brakes failed. Irvine assumed the role of team leader and was partnered by Finnish driver Mika Salo for the next six races. Irvine won the next race in Austria and was gifted the win by Mika Salo a week later in Germany, helping him to regain the lead of the Drivers' Championship. A further podium finish in Hungary followed, where he struggled with oversteer. In September it was announced that Irvine would move to the Jaguar team, which had purchased Stewart Grand Prix in June, and would be partnered by Johnny Herbert. Irvine finished out of the points in seventh place at the European Grand Prix after enduring an embarrassing 48-second pitstop while his mechanics searched for a missing tyre as they only had three ready for him when he came in.

Schumacher returned from injury at the penultimate race of the season, in Malaysia, and in a remarkable display, helped Irvine to win his fourth race of the season and head another Ferrari one-two, ahead of Häkkinen. Both Ferraris were later disqualified as it was discovered their car's bargeboards did not comply with Formula One's technical regulations. Ferrari appealed to the FIA, and it was held five days after the race, on 22 October. The following day, it was announced that the Court of Appeal overturned the decision, ensuring a Championship showdown at Suzuka. At the final race of the season in Japan, Irvine struggled in qualifying and crashed heavily, managing only fifth place; in the race he finished third, over a minute and a half behind Schumacher in second, and race winner Häkkinen. Irvine lost the Drivers' Championship to Häkkinen by just two points, but Irvine's efforts during the season helped Ferrari to clinch their first World Constructors' Championship in 16 years.

Irvine was awarded the Hawthorn Memorial Trophy, an annual award given to the most successful British or Commonwealth driver in Formula One over the course of one season. He was also named Autosport's British Competition Driver of the Year for 1999.

=== Jaguar (2000–2002) ===
==== 2000 ====
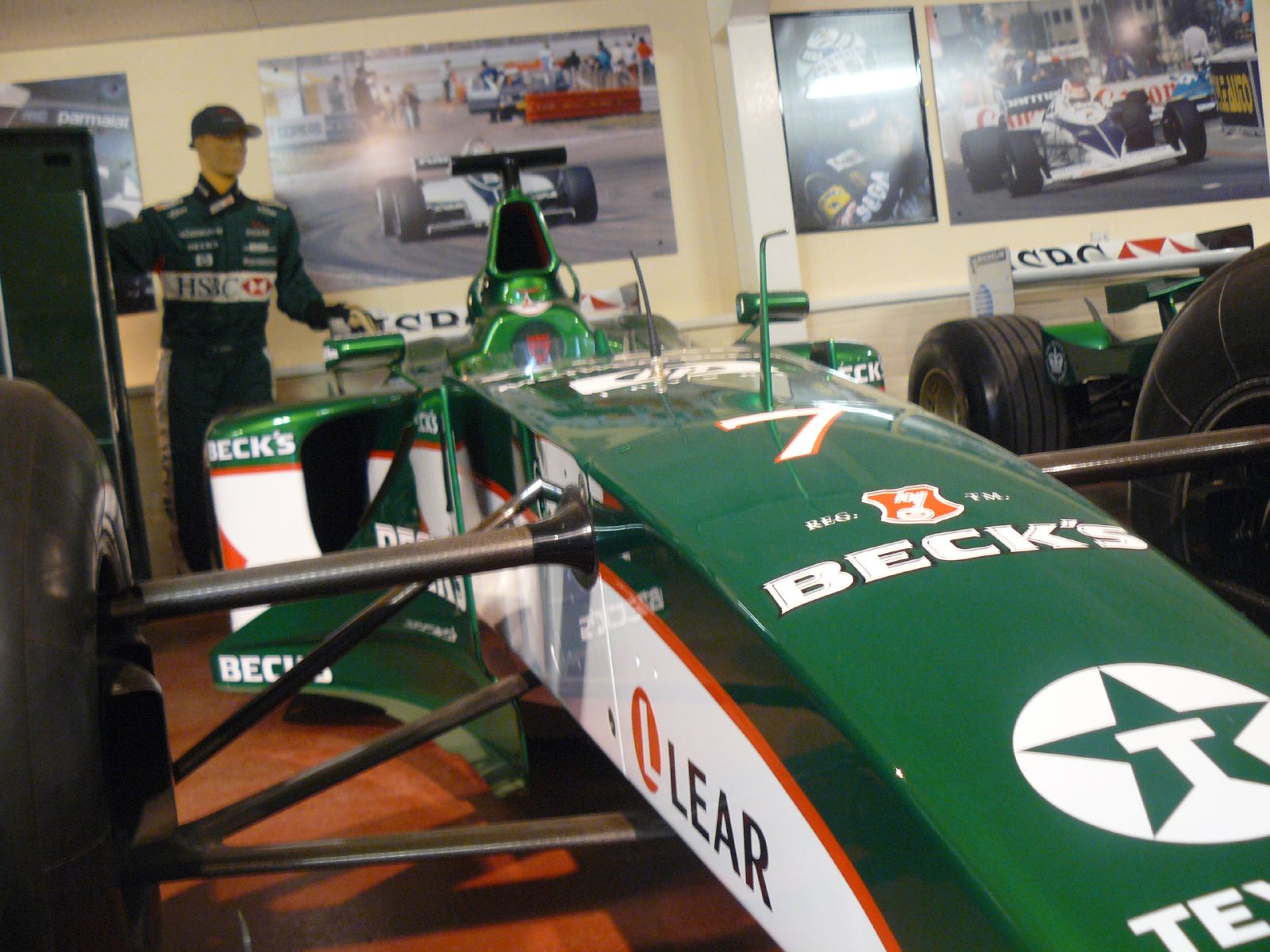
The Jaguar R1 driven by Irvine in 2000

Former British racing driver Stirling Moss aired doubts over Irvine's hopes to be a championship contender at Jaguar over the coming season. Former British World Drivers' Champion Jackie Stewart, said: "He really has come together. He's been in the shadow of a number one driver at Ferrari. I think it was time that he shed that shadow and went on to race for himself." Irvine endured a torrid start: At the opening two races held in Australia and Brazil, Irvine suffered consecutive retirements due to spinning out. However, he later managed to finish in the next three races, albeit outside of the points scoring positions. He retired from the European Grand Prix from a collision with Williams driver Ralf Schumacher after spinning from being overtaken by Arrows driver Jos Verstappen. At the next race in Monaco, Irvine scored Jaguar's first points with fourth place.

Irvine was forced to withdraw from the Austrian Grand Prix due to abdominal pains caused by a bout of appendicitis although he participated in the event's first free practice session. He was replaced by the team's test driver Luciano Burti. Irvine was passed fit for the German Grand Prix, where he secured tenth position despite a spin. He was unable to score further points in the next five races, which included a retirement in Italy when he collided with Salo on the first lap. He finished off the season by finishing the final three races which included a sixth-place points scoring finish at the season closing Malaysian Grand Prix. Irvine finished the season 13th in the Drivers' Championship and scored four points. Outside of Formula One, Irvine took part in the Belfast City Open and Direct Millennium Motorsport Festival driving a Jaguar sportscar to celebrate the marque's participation in the Tourist Trophy.

==== 2001 ====
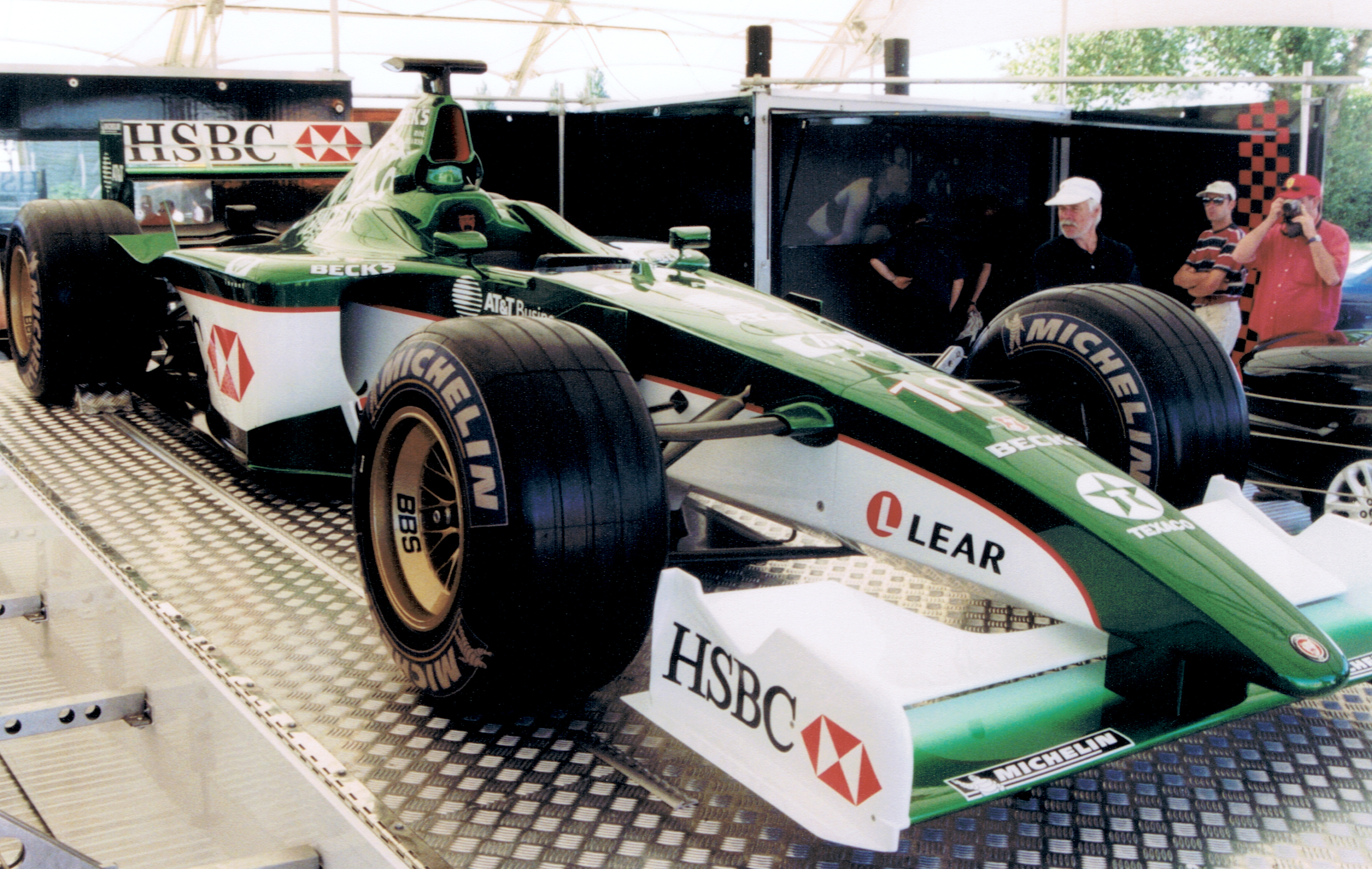
Irvine's Jaguar R2 for the 2001 season

Irvine remained at Jaguar for 2001 and was partnered by Luciano Burti. Despite his vocal frustrations, Jaguar team principal Bobby Rahal backed Irvine for the upcoming season, although Irvine was not confident citing his uncertainty about his team becoming competitive which he has made vocal. Rahal became concerned over Irvine's attitude when the team's car, the Jaguar R2, was underperforming during pre-season testing. Irvine supported the view of being sacked at the end of the season if his performances did not satisfy the team. Irvine clinched 11th place in the first round in Australia and failed to finish in the next four consecutive races. Before the Spanish Grand Prix, Burti left Jaguar to join the Prost team so Irvine was partnered with Pedro de la Rosa. Irvine took Jaguar's first podium finish with third place in the following round in Monaco. In June, it was confirmed that Irvine and de la Rosa would be retained by Jaguar for 2002.

Despite this success, Irvine failed to finish five of the next eight races. He suffered from a neck strain at a test session at Silverstone and took time resting during the summer break. During this period, Rahal attempted to sell Irvine to the Jordan team with an additional $10 million to Irvine's salary. Irvine rejected the contract as he wanted to help Jaguar become more competitive. The contract, originally mooted by Rahal as a joke, led to his sacking and he was replaced by Austrian World Champion Niki Lauda. At the Belgian Grand Prix, Irvine was involved in a collision with Burti who was trying to overtake him. Burti crashed at over 240 km/h and absolved any blame placed upon Irvine. Irvine managed to clinch his final points of the season with fifth in the United States and ended the season by retiring from the Japanese Grand Prix from a failure of his car's power generators on the fuel rig. Irvine finished the season 12th in the Drivers' Championship having scored six points.

==== 2002 ====
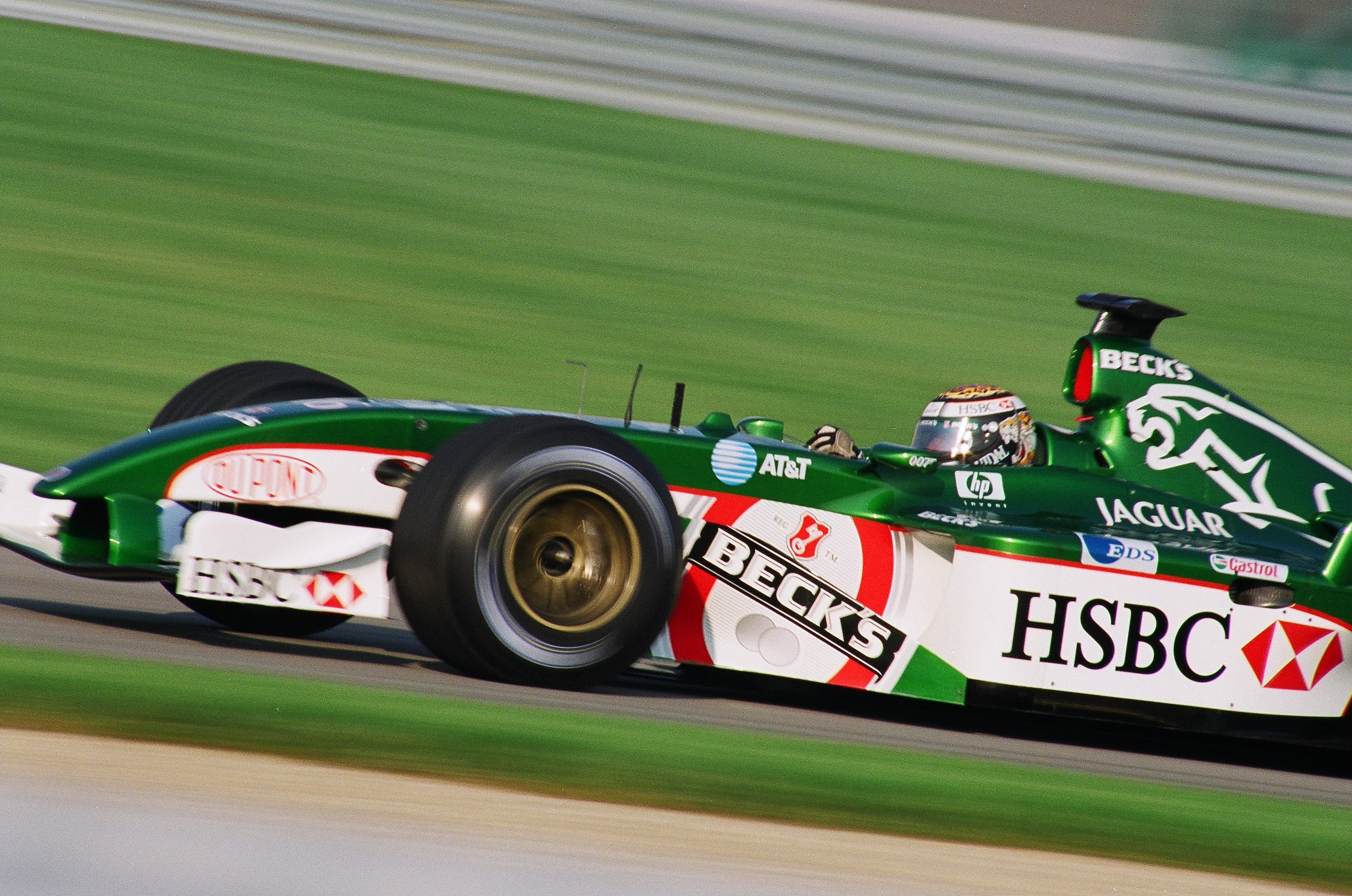
Irvine driving for Jaguar at the 2002 United States Grand Prix

Irvine remained at Jaguar for 2002 and was again partnered by de la Rosa. In preparation for the upcoming season, Irvine undertook a fitness examination and recorded a high score. However, he was cautious about his team's prospects going into the year, saying: "We've just got to wait and see what happens with this car, that's the question mark". At the opening round in Australia, Irvine finished fourth; and in the following race in Malaysia, he was forced to retire with an hydraulics problem. Irvine later managed to clinch seventh place in the Brazilian Grand Prix, before he suffered consecutive retirements in the next three races. He later finished the Monaco Grand Prix in ninth position, which was followed up with further consecutive retirements in the seven races. However, this marked a turning point as Irvine managed to finish in all of the remaining races. He was in the points scoring positions twice in this period—a sixth-place finish in Belgium and took his final career podium with third in Italy. He finished the season ninth in the Drivers' Championship, with eight points.

During the season, friction developed between Irvine and his team due to his vocal frustration at the lack of development of his car. He considered a return to his former team Jordan for the 2003 season, with no agreement reached due to the team's financial problems. Irvine also denied rumours that he would move into either the CART World Series or the IndyCar Series.

== Post-Formula One (2003–present) ==
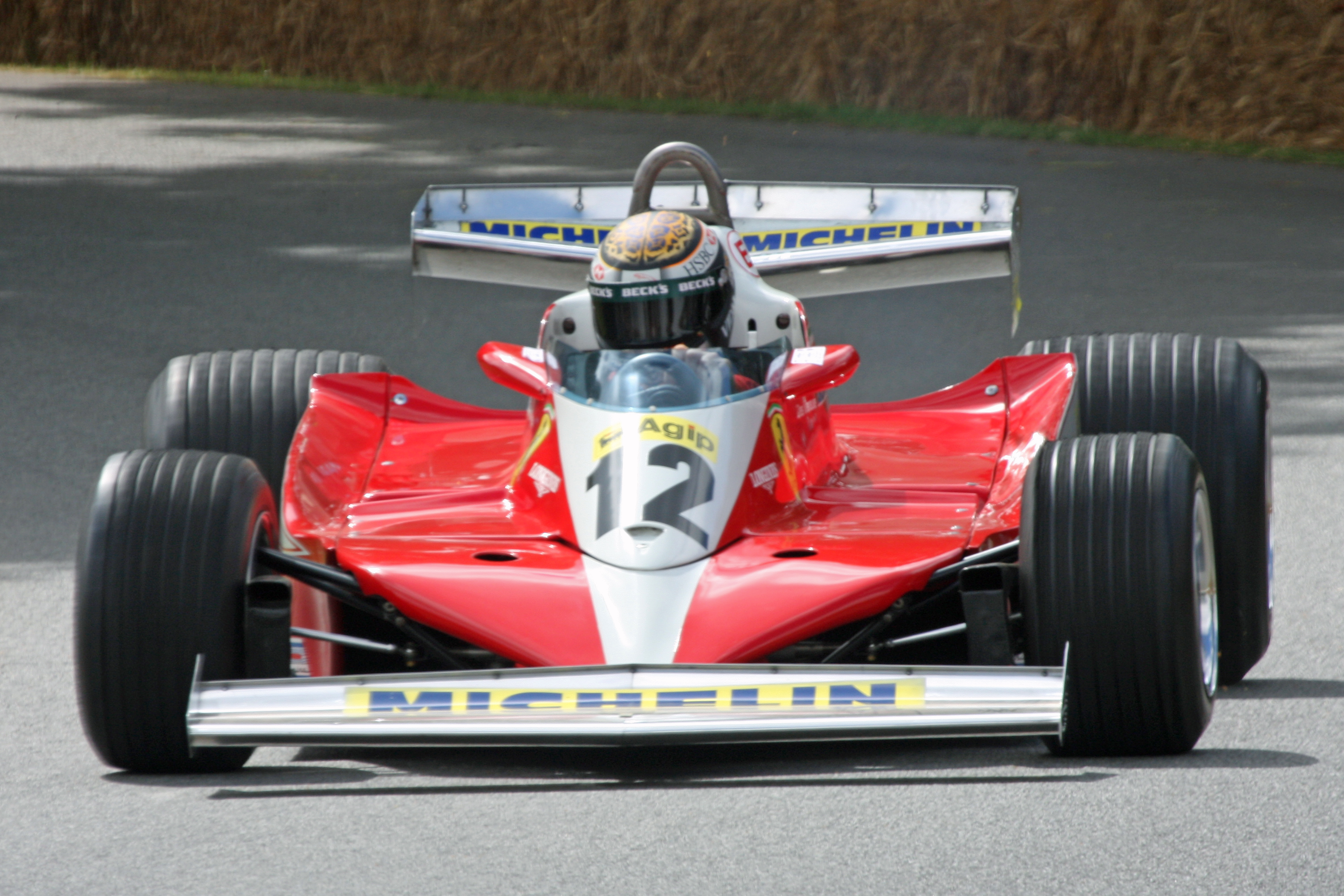
Irvine demonstrating a Ferrari 312T3 at the 2009 Goodwood Festival of Speed.

In 2002 Irvine successfully sued Talksport for passing off his image in a print advertisement, as if he had personally endorsed the station. The case, the first UK legal decision in which a passing-off action had succeeded in a false endorsement case, was resolved in the Court of Appeal in 2003. Eight years later, Irvine fronted a half-hour programme on the station, the LG Grand Prix Show, alongside regular Sunday evening presenter Andy Goldstein.

On 24 July 2003 Irvine was arrested after being caught driving a scooter over 30 mph through Hyde Park without a licence or insurance. He was to be sentenced at Bow Street Magistrates but did not attend. An arrest warrant with bail was issued.

Irvine played himself in the 2004 comedy The Prince & Me, which starred Julia Stiles. He was executive producer of a film produced about Paddy Mayne. In late 2006 he launched a new television programme on the Sky One channel called The Race, in which two teams of celebrity racing drivers competed against each other. David Coulthard was captain and coach of the girls team, and Irvine of the boys.

In May 2005 Irvine was rumoured to be heading a consortium to buy the Jordan Grand Prix team, and stated his interest in running the team. He was later linked to a possible sale of the Minardi team and held talks with team principal Paul Stoddart.

Irvine was a millionaire through property investment before reaching Formula One. He has a multi-million pound property portfolio, owning around forty properties throughout the world. According to the Sunday Times Rich List, published in April 2006, Irvine was the fifth richest person of Northern Ireland at that time, having increased his personal fortune to approximately £160 million. He is also the owner of Eddie Irvine Sports, a snooker, pool, kart racing, paintballing, and football facility in Bangor, close to his native Conlig.

Before pulling out because of a leg injury, Irvine was due to be one of the celebrities taking part in the 2006 ITV Soccer Aid. In aid of UNICEF, this television show featured an England vs the rest of the world football match, with teams made up of a mix of celebrities and ex-professionals.

On 9 January 2014 Irvine was sentenced to six months in prison in Italy after being found guilty of "mutual injury" following a brawl in a night club in Milan, Italy with Gabriele Moratti, son of former mayor of Milan Letizia Moratti. Moratti's lawyer Vincenzo Saponara told the media that the sentence was likely to be suspended and that neither man would go to jail.

== Personal life ==
Irvine named his biggest influence as his former girlfriend Maria Drummond, whom he met at the Macau Grand Prix in 1988. The pair remained friends for a year, staying in regular contact, until the relationship became deeper when Drummond split up from her boyfriend. From the relationship Irvine has a daughter, Zoe. He said that the birth of his daughter was the best moment of his life, despite not being a natural lover of babies.

Irvine is seen by many as a playboy in the mould of James Hunt, in contrast to the sport's modern stars, most of whom are seen as staid and less flamboyant. Irvine is also remembered for his tendency to speak his mind, often to the irritation of some. Despite this, Irvine does not consider himself to be a playboy stating his life is "90% work". He was nicknamed "Irv the Swerve" and later "Fast Eddie".

=== Nationality ===
Irvine has self-identified as being Irish:

But at the end of the day, I'm Irish. I mean, I've got a British passport, but if you're from Ireland, north or south, you're Irish. And 'British' is. . . such a nondescript thing, isn't it?

— 1995 interview.

By being from Northern Ireland, Irvine has the right to identify as British, Irish, or both, and to hold both British and Irish citizenship. He also held an Irish racing licence (drivers are not compelled to obtain their licence from their home country). The FIA's International Sporting Regulations state that drivers competing in FIA World Championships shall compete under the nationality of their passport, rather than that of the National Sporting Authority that issued their racing licence, as is the case in other racing series. Relating to Irvine's nationality, the FIA repeatedly mistakenly issued official entry lists that claimed Irvine was competing under the Irish nationality (e.g. entry list for the 1995 and 1996 season).

This situation created some confusion as to Irvine's nationality when he appeared at podium ceremonies in the Formula One World Championship. During some of his early podium appearances (at the 1995 Canadian Grand Prix, 1996 Australian Grand Prix, 1997 Argentine Grand Prix and 1997 Monaco Grand Prix), an Irish Tricolour was mistakenly flown by the race organisers. After the 1997 Argentine Grand Prix, his family received threatening phone calls. Irvine then requested that at subsequent races, a politically neutral shamrock flag be flown, and the non-sectarian "Londonderry Air" be played to mark a victory.

== Racing record ==
=== Career summary ===
Season	Series	Team	Races	Poles	Wins	Points	Position
1983	Formula Ford Races	?	20	?	?	?	?
1984	Misc Formula Ford Races	?	22	2	2	?	?
1985	Esso Formula Ford 1600	?	20	3	0	44	10th
1986	Misc Formula Ford Races	?	17	0	0	?	?
1987	Esso Formula Ford 1600	Van Diemen	14	5	6	165	**1st**
1987	RAC Formula Ford 1600	Van Diemen	12	10	8	160	**1st**
1987	Formula Ford Festival	Van Diemen	1	1	1	N/A	**1st**
1987	BBC Formula Ford 2000	Van Diemen	4	2	2	24	**2nd**
1988	British F3 championship	WSR	18	1	0	53	5th
1988	Cellnet Formula Three Race	WSR	1	0	0	N/A	R
1988	Macau Grand Prix	WSR	1	1	0	N/A	R
1989	International Formula 3000	Pacific	10	0	0	11	9th
1989	Macau Grand Prix	WSR	1	0	0	N/A	R
1990	International Formula 3000	Jordan	11	0	1	27	**3rd**
1990	Macau Grand Prix	WSR	1	0	0	N/A	**3rd**
1990	F3 Fuji Cup	WSR	1	0	0	N/A	**3rd**
1991	Japanese Formula 3000	Cerumo	11	0	1	14	7th
1992	Japanese Formula 3000	Cerumo	11	2	1	17	8th
1992	24 Hours of Le Mans	TOM'S/SARD	1	0	0	N/A	9th
1993	Japanese Formula 3000	Cerumo	10	4	1	32	**2nd**
1993	24 Hours of Le Mans	SARD Toyota	1	0	0	N/A	4th
1993	Formula One	Sasol Jordan	2	0	0	1	20th
1994	Formula One	Sasol Jordan	13	0	0	6	16th
1994	24 Hours of Le Mans	SARD Toyota	1	0	0	N/A	**2nd**
1995	Formula One	Total Jordan Peugeot	17	0	0	10	12th
1996	Formula One	Scuderia Ferrari	16	0	0	11	10th
1997	Formula One	Scuderia Ferrari Marlboro	17	0	0	24	7th
1998	Formula One	Scuderia Ferrari Marlboro	16	0	0	47	4th
1999	Formula One	Scuderia Ferrari Marlboro	16	0	4	74	**2nd**
2000	Formula One	Jaguar Racing	17	0	0	4	13th
2001	Formula One	Jaguar Racing	17	0	0	6	12th
2002	Formula One	Jaguar Racing	17	0	0	8	9th

=== Complete British Formula 3 results ===
(key) (Races in bold indicate pole position) (Races in italics indicate fastest lap)

Year	Entrant	Engine	Class	1	2	3	4	5	6	7	8	9	10	11	12	13	14	15	16	17	18	DC	Pts
1988	West Surrey Racing	Alfa Romeo	A	THR; 4	SIL; 2	THR; 11	BRH; 16	**DON**; 3	SIL; 6	BRH; 2	THR; 7	SIL; 2	DON; 2	SIL; 4	SNE; Ret	OUL; 4	SIL; 3	BRH; 6	SPA; 3	THR; Ret	SIL; 2	5th	53

=== Complete International Formula 3000 results ===
(key) (Races in bold indicate pole position; races in italics indicate fastest lap.)

Year	Entrant	1	2	3	4	5	6	7	8	9	10	11	DC	Points
1989	Pacific Racing	SIL; DNS	VAL; Ret	PAU; Ret	JER; Ret	PER; 3	BRH; Ret	BIR; 6	SPA; 9	BUG; 4	DIJ; 4		9th	11
1990	Eddie Jordan Racing	DON; Ret	SIL; 6	PAU; Ret	JER; DNS	MNZ; 2	PER; 4	HOC; 1	**BRH**; 3	BIR; Ret	BUG; 3	NOG; Ret	**3rd**	**27**

=== Complete Japanese Formula 3000 Championship results ===
(key) (Races in bold indicate pole position) (Races in italics indicate fastest lap)

Year	Entrant	1	2	3	4	5	6	7	8	9	10	11	DC	Points
1991	Team Cerumo	SUZ; 8	AUT; 5	FUJ; 15	MIN; 1	SUZ; 4	SUG; 7	FUJ; 13	SUZ; Ret	FUJ; C	SUZ; 13	FUJ; 9	7th	14
1992	Team Cerumo	SUZ; 8	FUJ; 4	**MIN**; 1	SUZ; Ret	**AUT**; Ret	SUG; Ret	FUJ; 7	FUJ; 5	SUZ; 4	**FUJ**; 11	SUZ; Ret	8th	17
1993	Team Cerumo	SUZ; 3	FUJ; 3	**MIN**; Ret	**SUZ**; 1	AUT; C	**SUG**; 15	FUJ; C	FUJ; 6	SUZ; 2	**FUJ**; 2	SUZ; 4	**2nd**	**32**

=== Complete 24 Hours of Le Mans results ===
Year	Team	Co-Drivers	Car	Class	Laps	Pos.	Class Pos.
1992	(Japan) Toyota Team Tom's (Japan) Kitz Racing Team with SARD	(Austria) Roland Ratzenberger (Sweden) Eje Elgh	Toyota 92C-V; Toyota R36V 3.6L Turbo V8	C2	321	9th	**2nd**
1993	(Japan) Toyota Team Tom's	(Japan) Toshio Suzuki (Japan) Masanori Sekiya	Toyota TS010; Toyota RV10 3.5 L V10	C1	364	4th	4th
1994	(Japan) SARD Company Ltd.	(Italy) Mauro Martini (United States) Jeff Krosnoff	Toyota 94C-V; Toyota R36V 3.6 L Turbo V8	LMP1 /C90	343	**2nd**	**1st**

=== Complete Formula One Grand Prix results ===
(key) (Races in bold indicate pole position) (Races in italics indicate fastest lap)

Year	Entrant	Chassis	Engine	1	2	3	4	5	6	7	8	9	10	11	12	13	14	15	16	17	WDC	Points
1993	Sasol Jordan	Jordan 193	Hart 1035 3.5 V10	RSA	BRA	EUR	SMR	ESP	MON	CAN	FRA	GBR	GER	HUN	BEL	ITA	POR	JPN; 6	AUS; Ret		22nd	1
1994	Sasol Jordan	Jordan 194	Hart 1035 3.5 V10	BRA; Ret	PAC	SMR	MON	ESP; 6	CAN; Ret	FRA; Ret	GBR; DNS	GER; Ret	HUN; Ret	BEL; 13^{†}	ITA; Ret	POR; 7	EUR; 4	JPN; 5	AUS; Ret		16th	6
1995	Total Jordan Peugeot	Jordan 195	Peugeot A10 3.0 V10	BRA; Ret	ARG; Ret	SMR; 8	ESP; 5	MON; Ret	CAN; 3	FRA; 9	GBR; Ret	GER; 9^{†}	HUN; 13^{†}	BEL; Ret	ITA; Ret	POR; 10	EUR; 6	PAC; 11	JPN; 4	AUS; Ret	12th	10
1996	Scuderia Ferrari	Ferrari F310	Ferrari 046 V10	AUS; 3	BRA; 7	ARG; 5	EUR; Ret	SMR; 4	MON; 7^{†}	ESP; Ret	CAN; Ret	FRA; Ret	GBR; Ret	GER; Ret	HUN; Ret	BEL; Ret	ITA; Ret	POR; 5	JPN; Ret		10th	11
1997	Scuderia Ferrari Marlboro	Ferrari F310B	Ferrari 046/2 V10	AUS; Ret	BRA; 16	ARG; 2	SMR; 3	MON; 3	ESP; 12	CAN; Ret	FRA; 3	GBR; Ret	GER; Ret	HUN; 9^{†}	BEL; 10^{†}	ITA; 8	AUT; Ret	LUX; Ret	JPN; 3	EUR; 5	7th	24
1998	Scuderia Ferrari Marlboro	Ferrari F300	Ferrari 047 V10	AUS; 4	BRA; 8	ARG; 3	SMR; 3	ESP; Ret	MON; 3	CAN; 3	FRA; 2	GBR; 3	AUT; 4	GER; 8	HUN; Ret	BEL; Ret	ITA; 2	LUX; 4	JPN; 2		4th	47
1999	Scuderia Ferrari Marlboro	Ferrari F399	Ferrari 048 V10	AUS; 1	BRA; 5	SMR; Ret	MON; 2	ESP; 4	CAN; 3	FRA; 6	GBR; 2	AUT; 1	GER; 1	HUN; 3	BEL; 4	ITA; 6	EUR; 7	MAL; 1	JPN; 3		**2nd**	**74**
2000	HSBC Jaguar Racing	Jaguar R1	Cosworth CR2 V10	AUS; Ret	BRA; Ret	SMR; 7	GBR; 13	ESP; 11	EUR; Ret	MON; 4	CAN; 13	FRA; 13	AUT; WD	GER; 10	HUN; 8	BEL; 10	ITA; Ret	USA; 7	JPN; 8	MAL; 6	13th	4
2001	HSBC Jaguar Racing	Jaguar R2	Cosworth CR3 V10	AUS; 11	MAL; Ret	BRA; Ret	SMR; Ret	ESP; Ret	AUT; 7	MON; 3	CAN; Ret	EUR; 7	FRA; Ret	GBR; 9	GER; Ret	HUN; Ret	BEL; DNS	ITA; Ret	USA; 5	JPN; Ret	12th	6
2002	HSBC Jaguar Racing	Jaguar R3	Cosworth CR3/CR4 V10	AUS; 4	MAL; Ret	BRA; 7	SMR; Ret	ESP; Ret	AUT; Ret	MON; 9	CAN; Ret	EUR; Ret									9th	8
2002	HSBC Jaguar Racing	Jaguar R3B	Cosworth CR3/CR4 V10										GBR; Ret	FRA; Ret	GER; Ret	HUN; Ret	BEL; 6	ITA; 3	USA; 10	JPN; 9	9th	8

^{†} Driver did not finish the Grand Prix, but was classified as they had completed over 90% of the race distance.

== Bibliography ==
- Irvine, Eddie; Nottage, Jane (2000). Life in the Fast Lane – Eddie Irvine, Jane Nottage. London, England: Random House. ISBN 978-0-09-187788-0.

Sporting positions
Preceded by Jason Elliot	British Formula Ford Champion; 1987	Succeeded by Derek Higgins
Preceded by Roland Ratzenberger	Formula Ford Festival Winner; 1987	Succeeded by Vincenzo Sospiri
Awards and achievements
Preceded by Paul Warwick	Autosport; British Club Driver of the Year; 1987	Succeeded by Allan McNish
Preceded by David Coulthard	Hawthorn Memorial Trophy; 1999	Succeeded by David Coulthard
Preceded by Dario Franchitti	Autosport; British Competition Driver of the Year; 1999	Succeeded by David Coulthard
