= 1997 Belgian Grand Prix =

Race 12 of 17 in the 1997 Formula One World Championship
← Previous race	Next race →
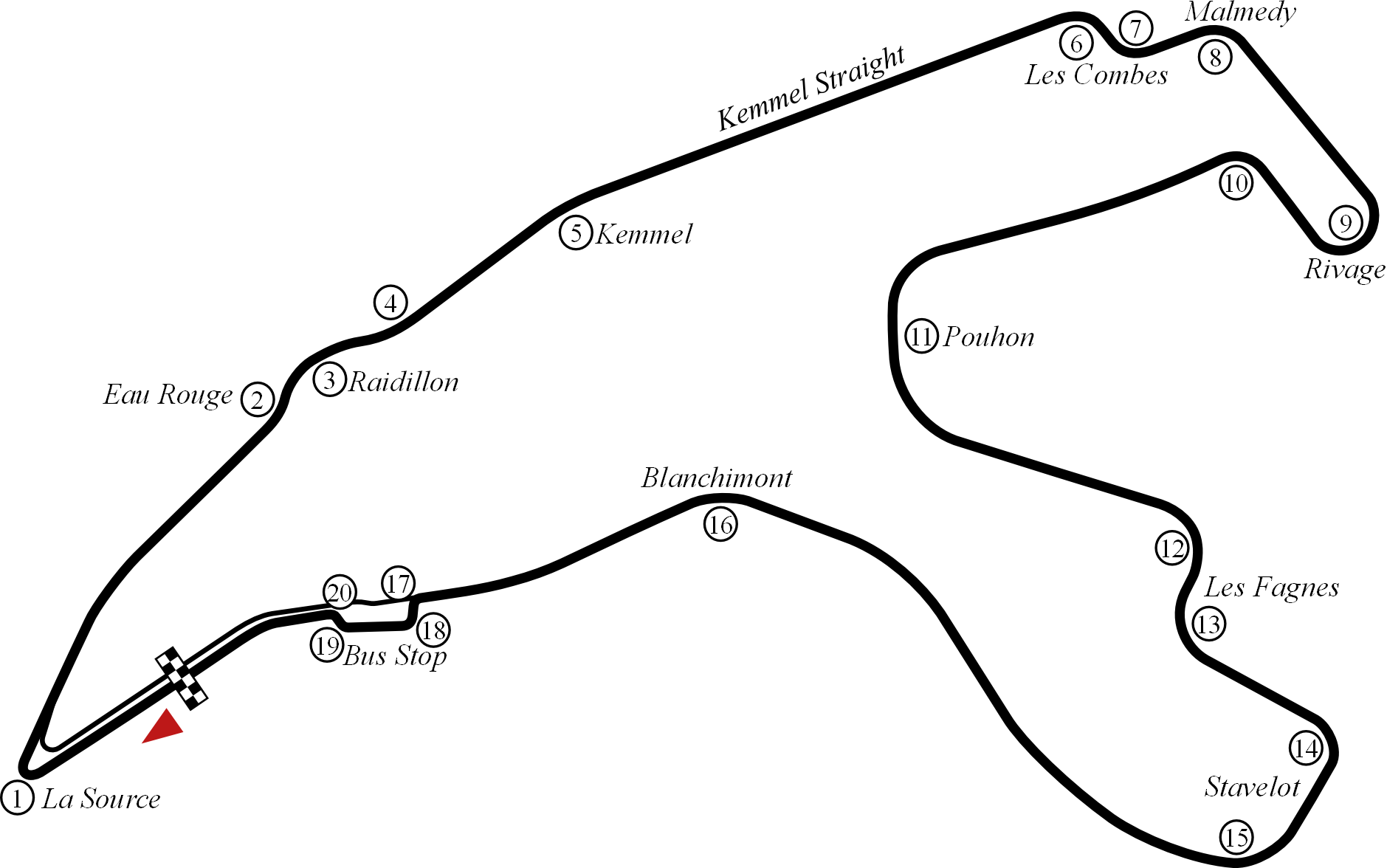

Race details
- Date: 24 August 1997
- Official name: LV Belgian Grand Prix
- Location: Circuit de Spa-Francorchamps; Francorchamps, Wallonia, Belgium
- Course: Permanent racing facility
- Course length: 6.968 km (4.330 miles)
- Distance: 44 laps, 306.592 km (190.507 miles)
- Weather: Wet, then drying out with temperatures reaching up to 28 °C (82 °F)

Pole position
Driver	(Canada) Jacques Villeneuve	Williams-Renault
- Time: 1:49.450

Fastest lap
Driver	(Canada) Jacques Villeneuve	Williams-Renault
- Time: 1:52.692 on lap 43

Podium
First	(Germany) Michael Schumacher	Ferrari
Second	(Italy) Giancarlo Fisichella	Jordan-Peugeot
Third	(Germany) Heinz-Harald Frentzen	Williams-Renault

The 1997 Belgian Grand Prix (formally the LV Belgian Grand Prix) was a Formula One motor race held at Spa-Francorchamps on 24 August 1997. It was the twelfth race of the 1997 Formula One World Championship.

The 44-lap race was won by Michael Schumacher, driving a Ferrari. Giancarlo Fisichella finished second in a Jordan-Peugeot, with Heinz-Harald Frentzen third in a Williams-Renault after Mika Häkkinen's McLaren-Mercedes was disqualified due to a fuel irregularity. Schumacher's Drivers' Championship rival, Jacques Villeneuve, finished fifth in the other Williams-Renault, having started from pole position. This was the first Formula One World Championship race to start behind a Safety Car.

With the win, Schumacher extended his lead over Villeneuve in the Drivers' Championship to 11 points with five races remaining.

== Report ==
Michael Schumacher started from third on the grid after qualifying had been dominated by his World Championship rival, Jacques Villeneuve. In the morning warm-up, which took place in hot, dry weather, Schumacher was only 15th. However, heavy rain started to fall around half an hour before the scheduled race start and continued for around twenty minutes, completely changing the conditions and resulting in the field starting behind the safety car, the first time this happened in Formula One history.

Schumacher's brother Ralf - who had qualified sixth - spun and crashed his Jordan at Stavelot while going to take his place on the grid. He was forced to start from the pit lane in his spare car. Explaining the incident to ITV later, he said: "I had nothing to lose, and I lost it.". Also during the period of cars assembling on the grid Michael Schumacher made exploratory laps (by returning to the pits rather than the grid) in both his race car and the spare Ferrari, enabling him to assess the track situation and choose the spare that had been set-up for intermediate weather conditions.

Of the front runners, both Williams drivers and Jean Alesi in the Benetton - alongside Villeneuve on the front row - started on full wet tyres while the others started on intermediates. The safety car circulated for the first three laps, and at the end of lap 4 - the first racing lap - Villeneuve continued to lead from Alesi and Schumacher. However, this was where the German driver started to take control of the race. He made a brave pass inside Alesi at the La Source hairpin at the start of lap 5, then overtook Villeneuve at the Rivage loop on the same lap. By the end of the lap he was already 5.8 seconds ahead, and on the next lap he stretched this lead to 16.9 seconds, with Giancarlo Fisichella - whose Jordan had also started on intermediates - moving into second after Villeneuve unexpectedly pitted.

On midfield the Arrows Yamaha showed strong pace on Bridgestone intermediate tyres. Pedro Diniz, who had already beaten teammate Damon Hill in qualifying, passed Heinz-Harald Frentzen, Johnny Herbert and David Coulthard on track to reach third place. The Brazilian driver pitted alongside Mika Häkkinen for dry tyres, however a sixteen-second pit made him drop to 12th place. He eventually made his way back to 7th place, but lost a potential podium finish.

Schumacher continued to pull further away, and by lap 12 his lead had reached a full minute, while Villeneuve had dropped to 16th following a second pit stop. By now, the track was drying and the drivers were pitting for slick tyres. Schumacher pitted in this manner on lap 14 and thereafter cruised, eventually winning by 26 seconds. Fisichella held off the McLaren of Mika Häkkinen for second, thus achieving his best finish in F1 at the time; the top six was completed by the second Williams of Heinz-Harald Frentzen, the Sauber of Herbert, and Villeneuve, who had charged back in the later stages of the race and set the fastest lap. On the last lap, Diniz outbraked Eddie Irvine at Les Combes for 8th place (that would become 7th later), meanwhile the Ferrari driver lost control of his car and collided.

After the race, Häkkinen was disqualified due to a fuel irregularity, thus promoting Frentzen to third, Herbert to fourth, Villeneuve to fifth and the second Benetton of Gerhard Berger to sixth. Nonetheless, Schumacher extended his lead over Villeneuve in the Drivers' Championship to 11 points, while Ferrari led Williams by six points in the Constructors' Championship.

== Classification ==
=== Qualifying ===
Pos	No	Driver	Constructor	Time	Gap
1	3	(Canada) Jacques Villeneuve	Williams-Renault	1:49.450	
2	7	(France) Jean Alesi	Benetton-Renault	1:49.759	+0.309
3	5	(Germany) Michael Schumacher	Ferrari	1:50.293	+0.843
4	12	(Italy) Giancarlo Fisichella	Jordan-Peugeot	1:50.470	+1.020
5	9	(Finland) Mika Häkkinen	McLaren-Mercedes	1:50.503	+1.053
6*	11	(Germany) Ralf Schumacher	Jordan-Peugeot	1:50.520	+1.070
7	4	(Germany) Heinz-Harald Frentzen	Williams-Renault	1:50.656	+1.206
8	2	(Brazil) Pedro Diniz	Arrows-Yamaha	1:50.853	+1.403
9	1	(United Kingdom) Damon Hill	Arrows-Yamaha	1:50.970	+1.520
10	10	(United Kingdom) David Coulthard	McLaren-Mercedes	1:51.410	+1.960
11	16	(United Kingdom) Johnny Herbert	Sauber-Petronas	1:51.725	+2.275
12	22	(Brazil) Rubens Barrichello	Stewart-Ford	1:51.916	+2.466
13	17	(Italy) Gianni Morbidelli	Sauber-Petronas	1:52.094	+2.644
14*	14	(Italy) Jarno Trulli	Prost-Mugen-Honda	1:52.274	+2.824
15	8	(Austria) Gerhard Berger	Benetton-Renault	1:52.391	+2.941
16	15	(Japan) Shinji Nakano	Prost-Mugen-Honda	1:52.749	+3.299
17	6	(United Kingdom) Eddie Irvine	Ferrari	1:52.793	+3.343
18	23	(Denmark) Jan Magnussen	Stewart-Ford	1:52.886	+3.436
19	19	(Finland) Mika Salo	Tyrrell-Ford	1:52.897	+3.447
20	20	(Japan) Ukyo Katayama	Minardi-Hart	1:53.544	+4.094
21	18	(Netherlands) Jos Verstappen	Tyrrell-Ford	1:53.725	+4.275
22	21	(Brazil) Tarso Marques	Minardi-Hart	1:54.505	+5.055
107% time: 1:57.112

- * Ralf Schumacher and Trulli would start from the pitlane.

=== Race ===
Pos	No	Driver	Constructor	Tyre	Laps	Time/Retired	Grid	Points
1	5	(Germany) Michael Schumacher	Ferrari	G	44	1:33:46.717	3	10
2	12	(Italy) Giancarlo Fisichella	Jordan-Peugeot	G	44	+26.753	4	6
3	4	(Germany) Heinz-Harald Frentzen	Williams-Renault	G	44	+32.147	7	4
4	16	(United Kingdom) Johnny Herbert	Sauber-Petronas	G	44	+39.025	11	3
5	3	(Canada) Jacques Villeneuve	Williams-Renault	G	44	+42.103	1	2
6	8	(Austria) Gerhard Berger	Benetton-Renault	G	44	+1:03.741	15	1
7	2	(Brazil) Pedro Diniz	Arrows-Yamaha	B	44	+1:25.931	8	
8	7	(France) Jean Alesi	Benetton-Renault	G	44	+1:42.008	2	
9	17	(Italy) Gianni Morbidelli	Sauber-Petronas	G	44	+1:42.582	13	
10	6	(United Kingdom) Eddie Irvine	Ferrari	G	43	Collision	17	
11	19	(Finland) Mika Salo	Tyrrell-Ford	G	43	+1 lap	19	
12	23	(Denmark) Jan Magnussen	Stewart-Ford	B	43	+1 lap	18	
13	1	(United Kingdom) Damon Hill	Arrows-Yamaha	B	42	Wheel nut	9	
14	20	(Japan) Ukyo Katayama	Minardi-Hart	B	42	Engine	20	
15	14	(Italy) Jarno Trulli	Prost-Mugen-Honda	B	42	+2 laps	PL	
Ret	18	(Netherlands) Jos Verstappen	Tyrrell-Ford	G	25	Spun off	21	
Ret	11	(Germany) Ralf Schumacher	Jordan-Peugeot	G	21	Spun off	PL	
Ret	10	(United Kingdom) David Coulthard	McLaren-Mercedes	G	19	Spun off	10	
Ret	21	(Brazil) Tarso Marques	Minardi-Hart	B	18	Spun off	22	
Ret	22	(Brazil) Rubens Barrichello	Stewart-Ford	B	8	Steering	12	
Ret	15	(Japan) Shinji Nakano	Prost-Mugen-Honda	B	5	Electrical	16	
DSQ	9	(Finland) Mika Häkkinen	McLaren-Mercedes	G	44	Fuel irregularity (+30.856)	5	

== Championship standings after the race ==
Drivers' Championship standings

Pos	Driver	Points
1	(Germany) Michael Schumacher	66
2	(Canada) Jacques Villeneuve	55
3	(Germany) Heinz-Harald Frentzen	23
4	(France) Jean Alesi	22
5	(Austria) Gerhard Berger	21

Constructors' Championship standings

Pos	Constructor	Points
1	(Italy) Ferrari	84
2	(United Kingdom) Williams-Renault	78
3	(Italy) Benetton-Renault	47
4	(United Kingdom) McLaren-Mercedes	28
5	(Republic of Ireland) Jordan-Peugeot	25

- Note: Only the top five positions are included for both sets of standings.

Previous race: 1997 Hungarian Grand Prix	FIA Formula One World Championship; 1997 season	Next race: 1997 Italian Grand Prix
Previous race: 1996 Belgian Grand Prix	Belgian Grand Prix	Next race: 1998 Belgian Grand Prix
