= Hart 1035 engine =

Overview
- Manufacturer: (United Kingdom) Hart
- Production: 1993–1994

Layout
- Configuration: 72° V10
- Displacement: 3.5 L (3,498 cc)
- Cylinder bore: 88 mm (3.5 in)
- Piston stroke: 57.52 mm (2.3 in)
- Valvetrain: 40-valve, DOHC, four-valves per cylinder

Combustion
- Fuel system: Direct fuel injection
- Fuel type: Gasoline
- Cooling system: Water-cooled

Output
- Power output: 700 hp (522 kW; 710 PS)
- Torque output: 335 lb⋅ft (454 N⋅m)

The Hart 1035 is a four-stroke, naturally aspirated, 3.5-litre, V10 racing engine, designed, developed and tuned by Brian Hart of Hart Racing Engines, between 1993 and 1994. It produced 700 hp (520 kW), and was used solely by the Jordan team.

Hart returned to Formula One with an in-house built 3.5 L V10 in 1993, dubbed the 1035, signing a two-year deal with the Jordan team. This culminated in a successful 1994 season, with Rubens Barrichello finishing third at the Pacific Grand Prix and taking the engine company's last F1 pole position at the Belgian Grand Prix.

== Applications ==
- Jordan 193
- Jordan 194
