= Jordan 196 =

Formula One racing car

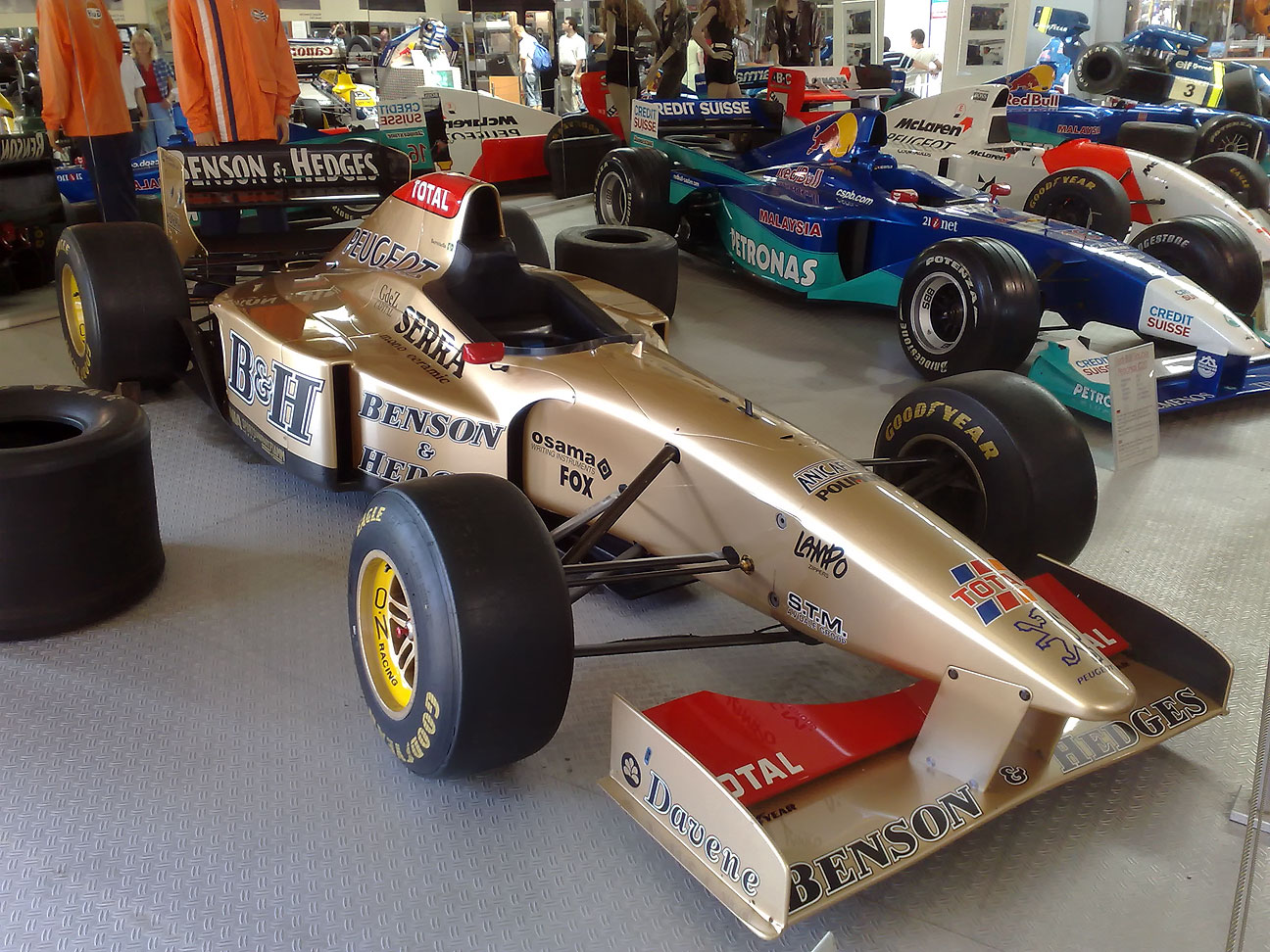
- The 196 on display at Technik Museum Sinsheim
- Category: Formula One
- Constructor: Jordan
- Designers: Gary Anderson (Technical Director); Mark Smith (Head of Transmission Design); John McQuilliam (Head of Composite Design); Darren Davies (Head of Aerodynamics)
- Predecessor: 195
- Successor: 197

Technical specifications
- Chassis: Carbon-fibre and honeycomb composite structure
- Suspension (front): Double wishbones, pushrod
- Suspension (rear): Double wishbones, pushrod
- Axle track: Front: 1,700 mm (67 in); Rear: 1,618 mm (63.7 in)
- Wheelbase: 2,950 mm (116 in)
- Engine: Peugeot A12, 3,000 cc (183.1 cu in), 72° V10, NA, mid-engine, longitudinally-mounted
- Transmission: Jordan 7-speed semi-automatic
- Power: 720 hp @ 15,500 rpm
- Weight: 595 kg (1,312 lb)
- Fuel: Total
- Tyres: Goodyear

Competition history
- Notable entrants: B&H Total Jordan Peugeot
- Notable drivers: 11. (Brazil) Rubens Barrichello; 12. (United Kingdom) Martin Brundle
- Debut: 1996 Australian Grand Prix
- Last event: 1996 Japanese Grand Prix
Races	Wins	Podiums	Poles	F/Laps
16	0	0	0	0
- Constructors' Championships: 0
- Drivers' Championships: 0

The Jordan 196 was the car with which the Jordan team competed in the 1996 Formula One World Championship. It was driven by Brazilian Rubens Barrichello, who was in his fourth and final season with the team, and veteran Briton Martin Brundle, who moved from Ligier for what was to be his last season in F1.

== Racing history ==
Jordan started the year with high expectations following a generally encouraging, if unreliable, showing in 1995. The team was in its second year with works Peugeot engines, and had also secured a lucrative sponsorship deal with Benson & Hedges that saw the cars turn gold for the majority of the 1996 season, having been launched in a pre-B&H green-yellow-red livery and raced for the first five races in a mustard shade that failed to impress on TV.

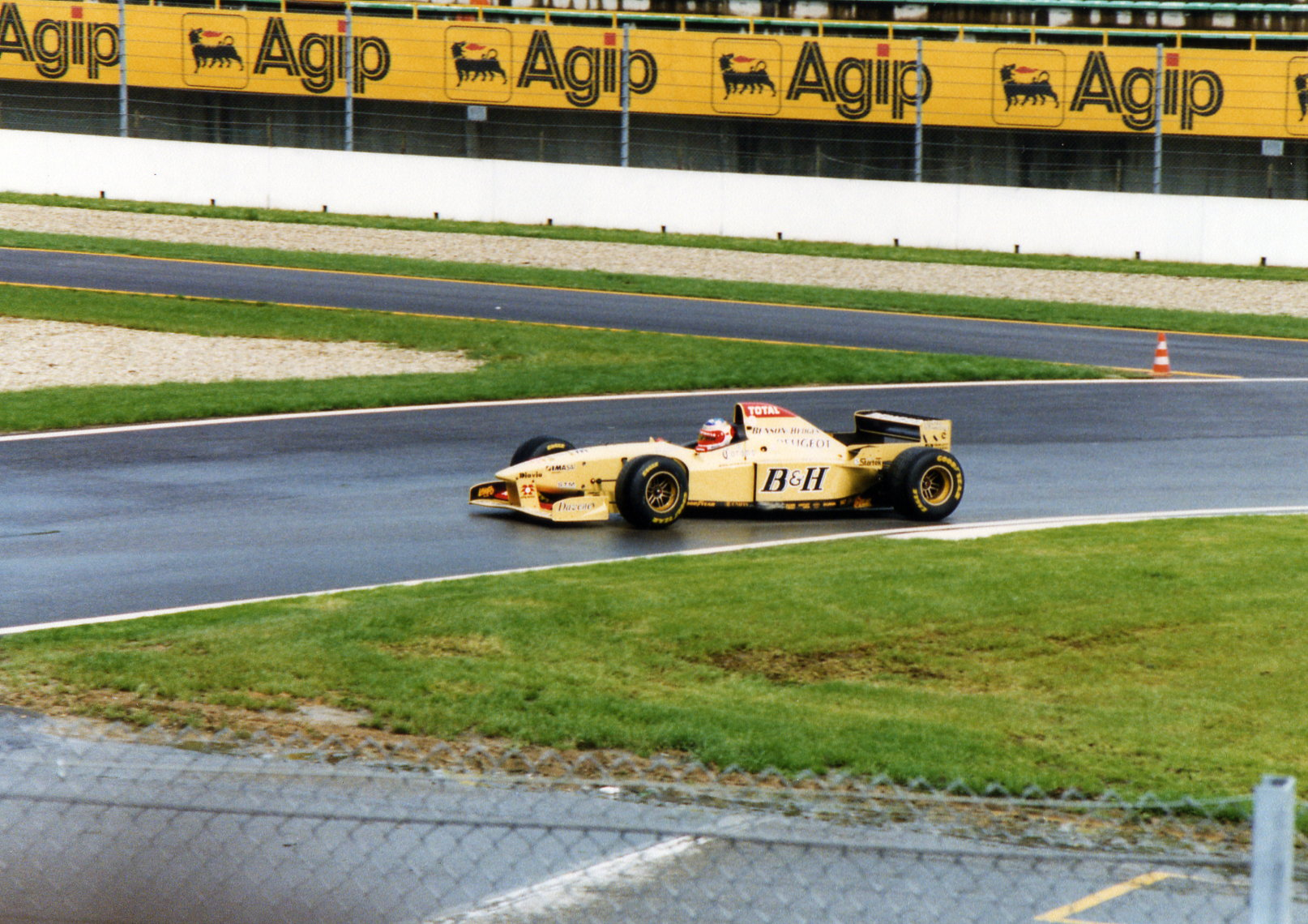
Early in the season, the car featured a brighter yellow colour.

However, the team still proved unable to score the elusive first win. Indeed, 1996 was a barren season with no podium finishes from either driver, although the team did score one more point than in 1995. Jordan remained a 'Second Division' team behind Williams, Ferrari, Benetton and McLaren. Brundle later, albeit in a jocular fashion, referred to the 196 as "a dog" which had "more grip upside down", referring to an accident on the opening lap of the 1996 Australian Grand Prix where Brundle rolled the car.

By the end of the year, the need for change was obvious. Barrichello departed for the new Stewart team, and Brundle retired from the sport becoming a television co-commentator alongside Murray Walker for ITV F1 for the 1997 season. They would be replaced by Ralf Schumacher and Giancarlo Fisichella for 1997.

The team eventually finished fifth in the Constructors' Championship, with 22 points.

== Sponsorship and livery ==
The 196 features a new gold livery (brighter yellow in the early season), reflecting with their new title sponsor, Benson & Hedges. In France, the Benson & Hedges logo was replaced with "Jordan", and in Britain and Germany, the drivers' names were replaced on the engine cover and "Special F1" on the side of the car.

== Complete Formula One results ==
(key) (results in bold indicate pole position)

Year	Team	Engine	Tyres	Drivers	1	2	3	4	5	6	7	8	9	10	11	12	13	14	15	16	Points	WCC
1996	B&H Total Jordan Peugeot	Peugeot V10	**G**		AUS	BRA	ARG	EUR	SMR	MON	ESP	CAN	FRA	GBR	GER	HUN	BEL	ITA	POR	JPN	**22**	**5th**
1996	B&H Total Jordan Peugeot	Peugeot V10	**G**	Rubens Barrichello	Ret	Ret	4	5	5	Ret	Ret	Ret	9	4	6	6	Ret	5	Ret	9	**22**	**5th**
1996	B&H Total Jordan Peugeot	Peugeot V10	**G**	Martin Brundle	Ret	12	Ret	6	Ret	Ret	Ret	6	8	6	10	Ret	Ret	4	9	5	**22**	**5th**
