= Jordan 194 =

Formula One racing car

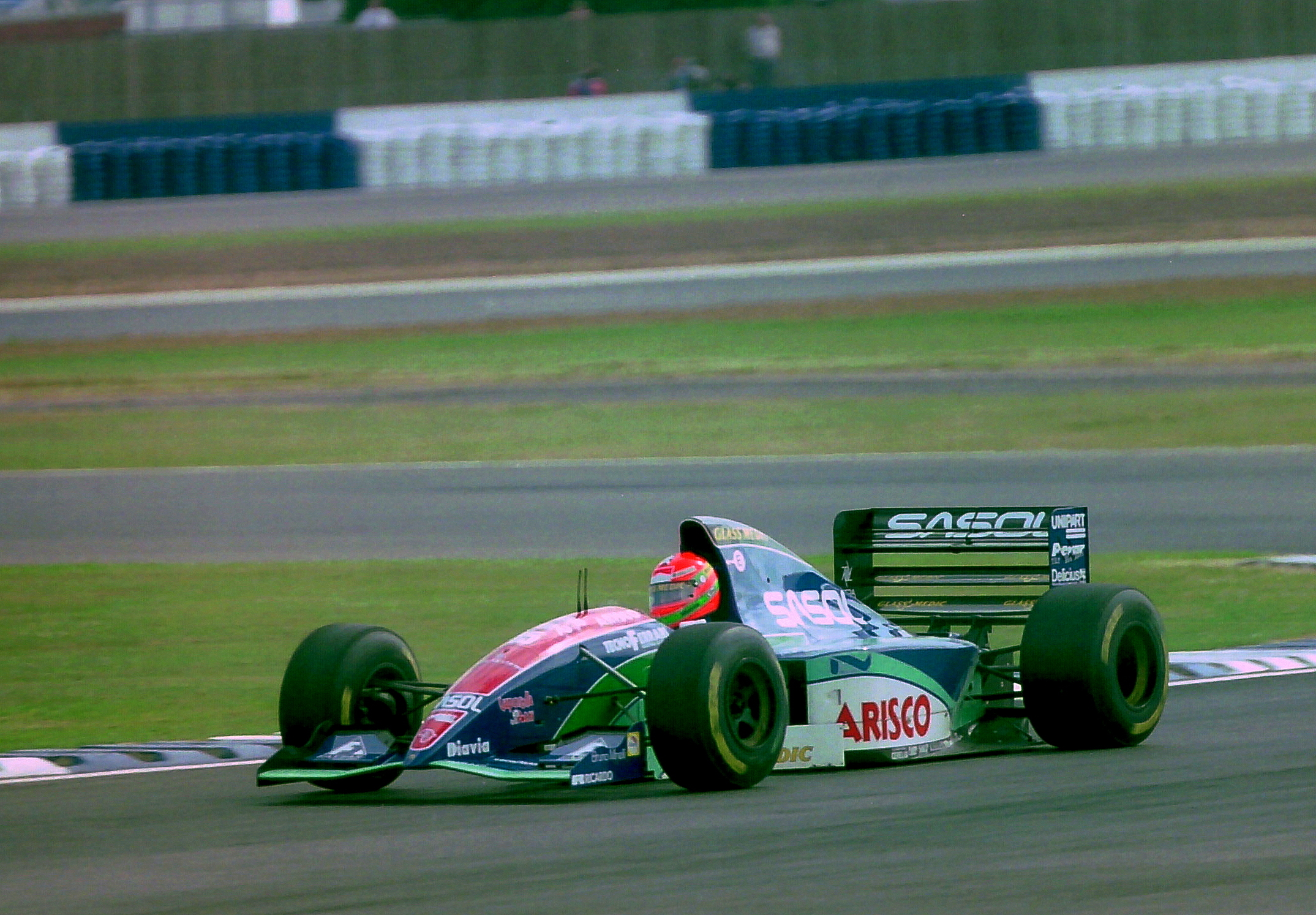
- Eddie Irvine driving the 194 at the 1994 British Grand Prix
- Category: Formula One
- Constructor: Jordan
- Designers: Gary Anderson (Technical Director); Steve Nichols (Chief Designer); Paul White (Senior Design Engineer); Mark Smith (Senior Design Engineer - Transmission); Andrew Green (Senior Design Engineer - Suspension); John McQuilliam (Senior Design Engineer - Composites); Darren Davies (Head of Aerodynamics)
- Predecessor: 193
- Successor: 195

Technical specifications
- Chassis: Carbon fibre and honeycomb composite structure
- Suspension (front): Double wishbones, pushrod
- Suspension (rear): Double wishbones, pushrod
- Engine: Hart 1035, 3,499 cc (213.5 cu in), V10 (max: 13600 rpm) NA, mid-engine, longitudinally-mounted
- Transmission: Jordan transverse 6-speed semi-automatic
- Power: 700 hp @ 13,000 rpm
- Fuel: Sasol
- Tyres: Goodyear

Competition history
- Notable entrants: Sasol Jordan
- Notable drivers: 14. (Brazil) Rubens Barrichello; 15. (United Kingdom) Eddie Irvine; 15. (Japan) Aguri Suzuki; 15. (Italy) Andrea de Cesaris
- Debut: 1994 Brazilian Grand Prix
- Last event: 1994 Australian Grand Prix
Races	Wins	Podiums	Poles	F/Laps
16	0	1	1	0
- Constructors' Championships: 0
- Drivers' Championships: 0

The Jordan 194 was the car with which the Jordan team competed in the 1994 Formula One World Championship. The number 14 car was driven by Rubens Barrichello and the number 15 car by Eddie Irvine, with Aguri Suzuki and Andrea de Cesaris deputising for Irvine when he was banned for three races early in the season. Kelvin Burt was named as test driver, but his mileage in the car was limited.

== Design ==
The engine was a Hart 1035 3.5 V10, a developed version of the engine which had proved promising in 1993. With driver aids such as traction control and active suspension banned for the 1994 season, the car used a conventional semi-automatic gearbox and pushrod double wishbone suspension. The simpler technical regulations of 1994 seemed to benefit Jordan and the 194 recaptured the level of performance seen in the team's debut season, 1991. Indeed, the cut-down airbox and drooping front wing of the 194 recalled the design features of the 191.

== Competition summary ==
Barrichello started the season with a 4th-place finish at the 1994 Brazilian Grand Prix, equalling the team's then best-ever result and coming home as the highest finishing Brazilian after Senna retired from the race. However, Irvine was involved in a major accident with Jos Verstappen, Éric Bernard and Martin Brundle, resulting in the retirement of all four cars. Irvine was deemed to have caused the accident and banned for the following race. He and the team appealed, only to have the ban extended to three races.

At short notice Aguri Suzuki joined the team for the Pacific Grand Prix but was ill-prepared for an F1 return and failed to perform well. At this GP Barrichello scored his and Jordan's first-ever F1 podium finish, with third place and placing second in the championship only behind Michael Schumacher. At the following San Marino GP, Barrichello was injured in a practice accident and did not start the race that saw the death of Ayrton Senna. Andrea de Cesaris substituted for the still-banned Irvine at San Marino and at the subsequent Monaco Grand Prix where he finished in 4th place. Irvine returned at the Spanish Grand Prix and scored a point for 6th while Barrichello still appeared to suffer following his accident and the death of Senna, his countryman and idol.

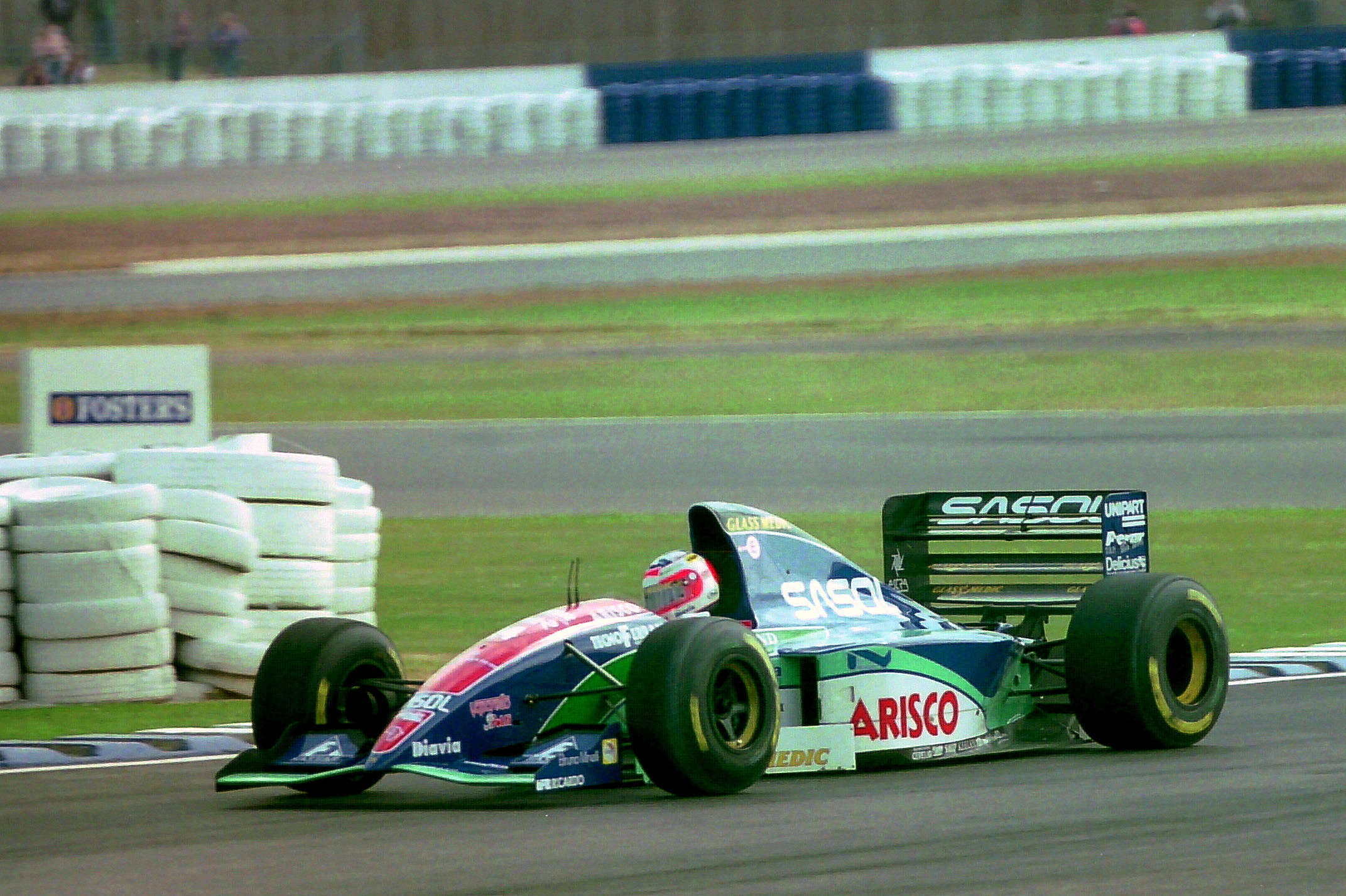
Barrichello at the British Grand Prix

As the season progressed, both drivers continued to score fairly consistently. Barrichello took 4th places in the British, Italian, Portuguese and Australian Grands Prix, and Irvine was 4th at the European Grand Prix and 5th in the Japanese Grand Prix. At the Belgian Grand Prix, Barrichello recorded the fastest time in Friday qualifying on a rapidly-drying track. With Saturday qualifying wet, no one was able to beat his time, and so he took his and Jordan's first F1 pole position, and became the youngest pole position holder in F1 history, a record which stood until Fernando Alonso took his debut pole position at the 2003 Malaysian Grand Prix. Barrichello retired from the race following a driving error while lapping a slower car. The season ended with Jordan having scored 28 points, their then highest-ever seasonal score, and having restored themselves to 5th place in the Constructors' Championship behind the 'big four' teams of Williams, Benetton, Ferrari and McLaren.

At the Italian Grand Prix, Jordan announced an agreement to use factory-supported Peugeot engines in F1 from 1995, meaning the relationship with Hart came to an end after the Australian Grand Prix. The Peugeot engines powered the new Jordan 195.

== Livery ==
The team's main sponsor was Sasol for the third and final year, with an additional financial support from Arisco, the Irish government and other smaller sponsors. Barclay sponsorship was dropped from the team.

At the French Grand Prix, the 194s carried the scoreline of the Republic of Ireland football team's victory over Italy during the group stages of the 1994 FIFA World Cup.

== BOSS GP ==
The 194 was used in the BOSS GP Series, driven by Tony Worswick and won the Open Class title in 1999 and 2001.

== Complete Formula One results ==
(key) (results in bold indicate pole position)

Year	Team	Engine	Tyres	Drivers	1	2	3	4	5	6	7	8	9	10	11	12	13	14	15	16	Points	WCC
1994	Sasol Jordan	Hart 1035; V10	**G**		BRA	PAC	SMR	MON	ESP	CAN	FRA	GBR	GER	HUN	BEL	ITA	POR	EUR	JPN	AUS	**28**	**5th**
1994	Sasol Jordan	Hart 1035; V10	**G**	Rubens Barrichello	4	3	DNQ	Ret	Ret	7	Ret	4	Ret	Ret	**Ret**	4	4	12	Ret	4	**28**	**5th**
1994	Sasol Jordan	Hart 1035; V10	**G**	Eddie Irvine	Ret				6	Ret	Ret	DNS	Ret	Ret	13	Ret	7	4	5	Ret	**28**	**5th**
1994	Sasol Jordan	Hart 1035; V10	**G**	Aguri Suzuki		Ret															**28**	**5th**
1994	Sasol Jordan	Hart 1035; V10	**G**	Andrea de Cesaris			Ret	4													**28**	**5th**
