= Jordan 192 =

Formula One racing car

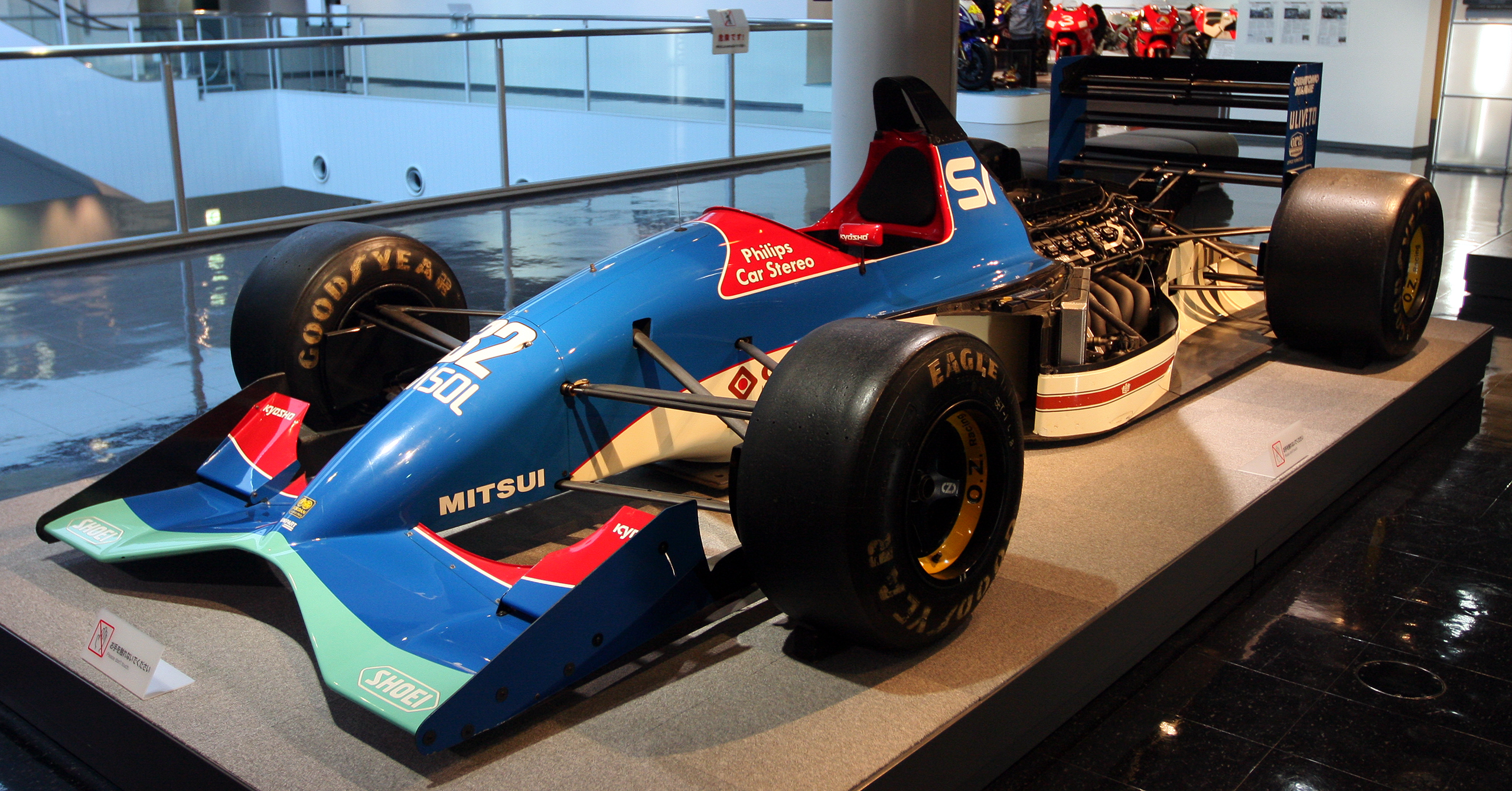
- The Jordan 192 of Stefano Modena on display in Yamaha Communication Plaza
- Category: Formula One
- Constructor: Jordan
- Designers: Gary Anderson (Technical Director); Paul White (Senior Design Engineer); Mark Smith (Senior Design Engineer - Transmission); Andrew Green (Senior Design Engineer - Suspension); John McQuilliam (Senior Design Engineer - Composites)
- Predecessor: 191
- Successor: 193

Technical specifications
- Chassis: Carbon fibre and honeycomb composite structure
- Suspension (front): Double wishbones, pushrod
- Suspension (rear): Double wishbones, pushrod
- Engine: Yamaha OX99, 3,498 cc (213.5 cu in), 70° V12, NA, mid-engine, longitudinally mounted
- Transmission: Jordan 7-speed semi-automatic
- Fuel: Sasol
- Tyres: Goodyear

Competition history
- Notable entrants: Sasol Jordan Yamaha
- Notable drivers: 32. (Italy) Stefano Modena; 33. (Brazil) Maurício Gugelmin
- Debut: 1992 South African Grand Prix
- Last event: 1992 Australian Grand Prix
Races	Wins	Podiums	Poles	F/Laps
16	0	0	0	0
- Constructors' Championships: 0
- Drivers' Championships: 0

The Jordan 192 was a Formula One car designed by Gary Anderson and used by the Jordan team in the 1992 Formula One World Championship. The number 32 car was driven by Italian Stefano Modena and the number 33 car by Brazilian Maurício Gugelmin, both new to the team.

== Design ==
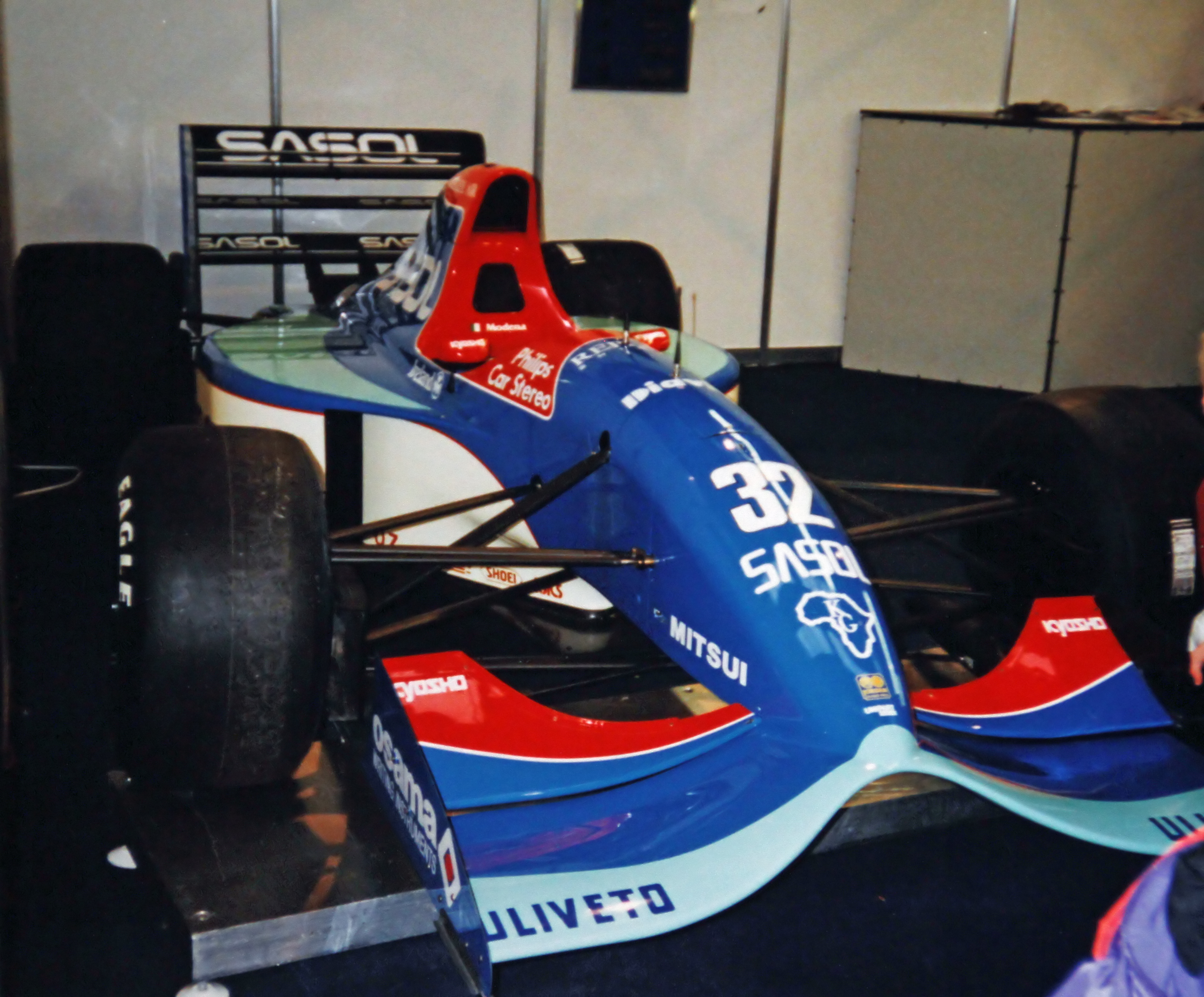
The Jordan 192 of Stefano Modena

=== Chassis ===
The design was largely identical to its predecessor with a major difference on its engine cover and front wing.

=== Engine ===
After a successful debut season in 1991 the team lost their supply of Ford engines due to large debts. Instead Jordan signed a contract to run the Yamaha OX99 3.5L V12, which was supplied for free. One of the problems was that the team had already begun work on the 192 in the expectation that it would continue to run the Ford V8 rather than the much larger Yamaha V12.

== Season overview ==
Compared to 1991, 1992 was a disastrous season for Jordan. The team struggled badly with reliability issues (in particular overheating), with Gugelmin retiring from seven of the first nine races and Modena failing to finish a race until the twelfth race of the season in Belgium. Modena also failed to qualify four times. The team did not score a point until the final race of the season in Australia, when Modena finished sixth. With this one point, Jordan placed 11th in the Constructors' Championship.

The 192 was replaced for 1993 by the 193, which was powered by a Hart V10 engine.

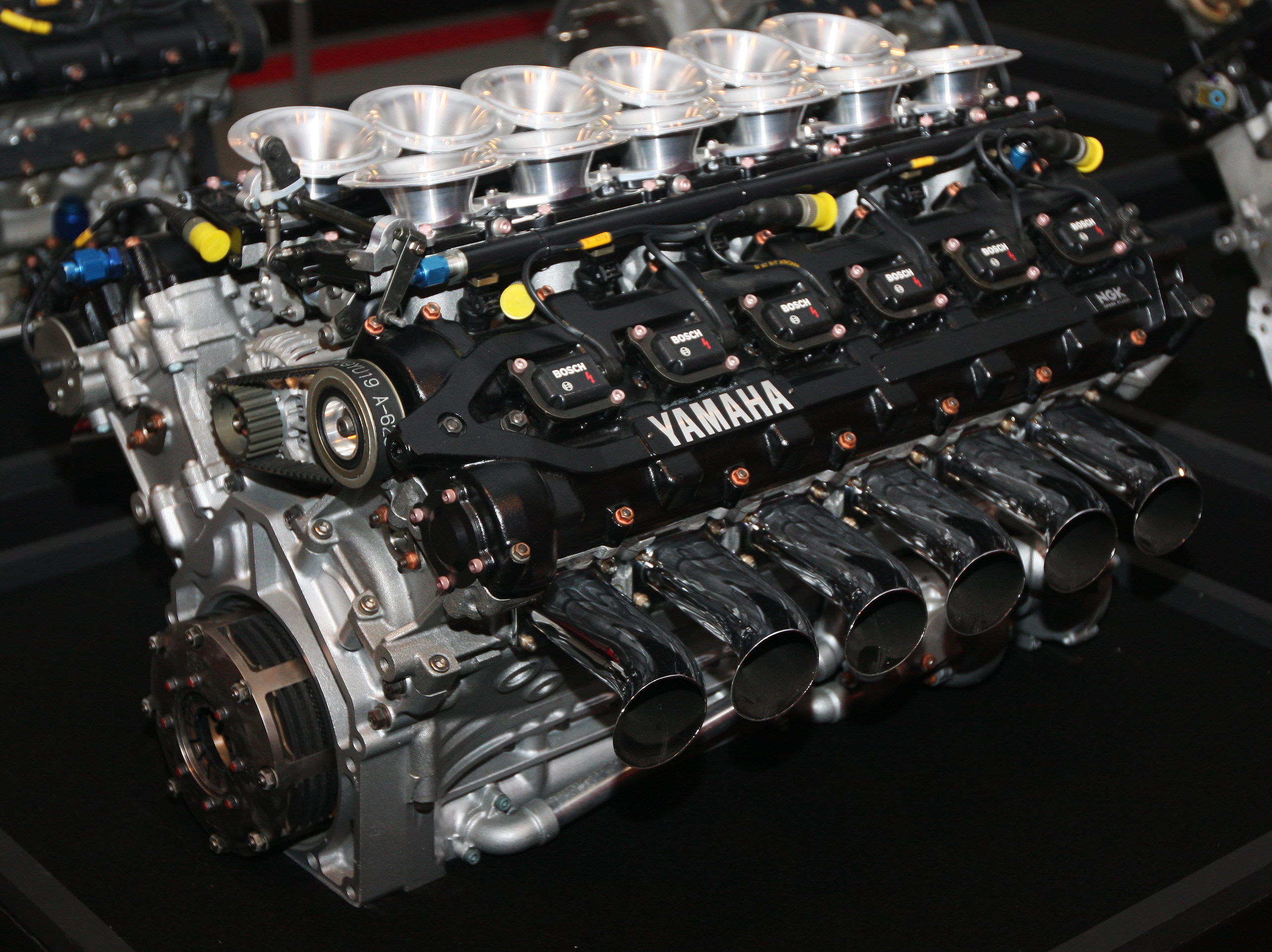
The Yamaha OX99 engine that powered the 192.

== Livery ==
During the pre-season testing, the car was painted in green interim livery before switching into a light blue to reflect the team's new title sponsor Sasol, replacing 7 Up along with Philips Car Systems, Kyosho and other smaller sponsors.

In the Grands Prix that did not allow tobacco branding, the Barclay logos were replaced with a brand's emblem.

== Complete Formula One results ==
(Key) Results in bold indicate pole position and results in italics indicate fastest lap in race.

Year	Team	Engine	Tires	Drivers	1	2	3	4	5	6	7	8	9	10	11	12	13	14	15	16	Pts.	WCC
1992	Sasol Jordan	Yamaha OX99; V12	**G**		RSA	MEX	BRA	ESP	SMR	MON	CAN	FRA	GBR	GER	HUN	BEL	ITA	POR	JPN	AUS	1	11th
1992	Sasol Jordan	Yamaha OX99; V12	**G**	Stefano Modena	DNQ	Ret	Ret	DNQ	Ret	Ret	Ret	Ret	Ret	DNQ	Ret	15	DNQ	13	7	6	1	11th
1992	Sasol Jordan	Yamaha OX99; V12	**G**	Maurício Gugelmin	11	Ret	Ret	Ret	7	Ret	Ret	Ret	Ret	15	10	14	Ret	Ret	Ret	Ret	1	11th
