= Jordan 197 =

Formula One racing car

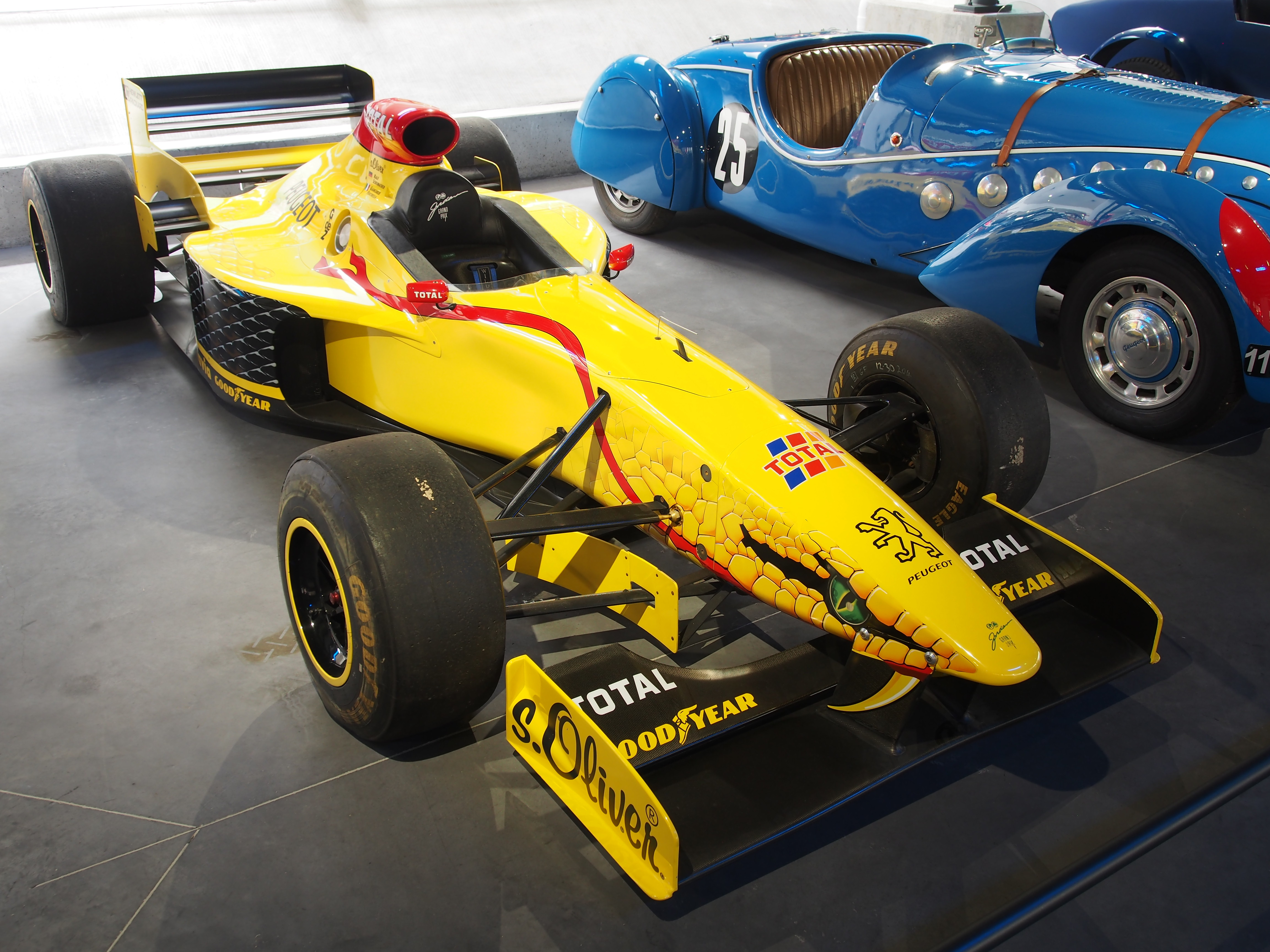
- The 197 on display at Musée de l'Aventure Peugeot
- Category: Formula One
- Constructor: Jordan
- Designers: Gary Anderson (Technical Director); Mark Smith (Chief Engineer); Paul Crooks (Design Coordinator); John McQuilliam (Head of Composite Design); Ian Hall (Head of Transmission Design); John Davis (Head of R&D); Seamus Mullarkey (Head of Aerodynamics)
- Predecessor: 196
- Successor: 198

Technical specifications
- Chassis: carbon-fibre and honeycomb composite structure
- Suspension (front): Double wishbones, pushrod
- Suspension (rear): Double wishbones, pushrod
- Axle track: Front: 1,700 mm (67 in); Rear: 1,618 mm (63.7 in)
- Wheelbase: 2,950 mm (116 in)
- Engine: Peugeot A14, 3,000 cc (183.1 cu in), 72° V10, NA, mid-engine, longitudinally-mounted
- Transmission: Jordan 7-speed sequential semi-automatic
- Power: 750 hp @ 15,500 rpm
- Weight: 600 kg (1,300 lb)
- Fuel: Total
- Tyres: Goodyear

Competition history
- Notable entrants: Benson & Hedges Jordan Peugeot
- Notable drivers: 11. (Germany) Ralf Schumacher; 12. (Italy) Giancarlo Fisichella
- Debut: 1997 Australian Grand Prix
- Last event: 1997 European Grand Prix
Races	Wins	Podiums	Poles	F/Laps
17	0	3	0	1
- Constructors' Championships: 0
- Drivers' Championships: 0

The Jordan 197 was the Formula One car with which the Jordan team competed in the 1997 Formula One World Championship.

== Background ==
=== Driver change ===
After a disappointing 1996 season, Eddie Jordan opted to replace Rubens Barrichello and Martin Brundle with two young, inexperienced drivers — German rookie Ralf Schumacher, younger brother of double World Champion Michael Schumacher, and Italy's Giancarlo Fisichella, who had driven eight races for Minardi in 1996.

=== Technical specifications ===
The car was powered by the 3-litre Peugeot A14 V10 engine and ran on Goodyear tyres. Fuel was supplied by Total.

== Racing history ==
Schumacher and Fisichella recorded six points finishes each, including three podiums — Schumacher third in Argentina, only his third F1 race, and Fisichella third in Canada and second in Belgium. Fisichella also set the fastest race lap in Spain and qualified on the front row of the grid in Germany, and there was a behind-the-scenes battle between Jordan and Benetton for his services in 1998, a battle eventually won by Benetton. Fisichella eventually finished ninth in the Drivers' Championship with 20 points while Schumacher was twelfth with 13 (both were subsequently promoted a place following Michael Schumacher's exclusion from the standings); the combined 33 points placed Jordan fifth in the Constructors' Championship.

== Sponsorship and livery ==
For the second consecutive year, the team's title sponsor was Benson & Hedges. The 197 stood out with its bright yellow livery featuring a snake mascot, dubbed "Hissing Sid". The car had a snake's eye and fang painted on either side of the nosecone, forked tongues that extended along the sides from the nosecone to the driver's cockpit, and numerous scale effects on other parts of the car. In France, Britain and Germany, Benson & Hedges were replaced with the snake-related "Bitten & Hisses" covered by a snake skin, or "Ssssschuhey" and "Fissssssi".

== Complete Formula One results ==
(key) (results in bold indicate pole position; results in italics indicate fastest lap)

Year	Team	Engine	Tyres	Drivers	1	2	3	4	5	6	7	8	9	10	11	12	13	14	15	16	17	Points	WCC
1997	Benson & Hedges Jordan Peugeot	Peugeot V10	**G**		AUS	BRA	ARG	SMR	MON	ESP	CAN	FRA	GBR	GER	HUN	BEL	ITA	AUT	LUX	JPN	EUR	**33**	**5th**
1997	Benson & Hedges Jordan Peugeot	Peugeot V10	**G**	Ralf Schumacher	Ret	Ret	3	Ret	Ret	Ret	Ret	6	5	5	5	Ret	Ret	5	Ret	9	Ret	**33**	**5th**
1997	Benson & Hedges Jordan Peugeot	Peugeot V10	**G**	Giancarlo Fisichella	Ret	8	Ret	4	6	9	3	9	7	11	Ret	2	4	4	Ret	7	11	**33**	**5th**
