= Jordan 193 =

Formula One racing car

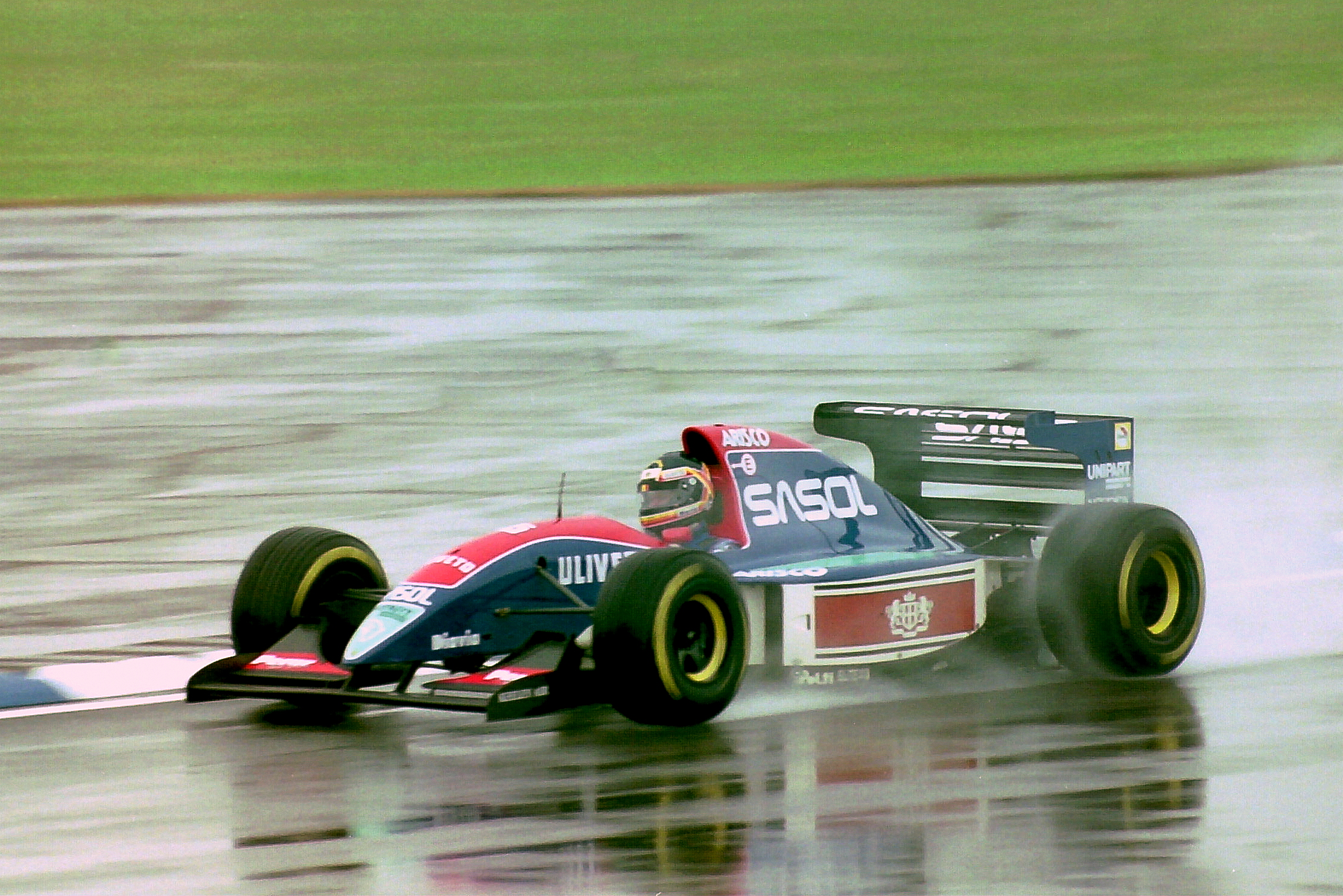
- Thierry Boutsen practicing for the 1993 British Grand Prix
- Category: Formula One
- Constructor: Jordan
- Designers: Gary Anderson (Technical Director); Paul White (Senior Design Engineer); Mark Smith (Senior Design Engineer - Transmission); Andrew Green (Senior Design Engineer - Suspension); John McQuilliam (Senior Design Engineer - Composites)
- Predecessor: 192
- Successor: 194

Technical specifications
- Chassis: Carbon fibre and honeycomb composite structure
- Suspension (front): Double wishbones, pushrod
- Suspension (rear): Double wishbones, pushrod
- Axle track: Front: 1,690 mm (67 in); Rear: 1,610 mm (63 in)
- Wheelbase: 2,805 mm (110.4 in)
- Engine: Hart 1035, 3,499 cc (213.5 cu in), V10 (max: 13500 rpm), NA, mid-engine, longitudinally-mounted
- Transmission: Jordan / XTrac T 6-speed semi-automatic
- Power: 700 hp @ 13,000 rpm
- Weight: 510 kg (1,120 lb)
- Fuel: Sasol
- Tyres: Goodyear

Competition history
- Notable entrants: Sasol Jordan
- Notable drivers: 14. (Brazil) Rubens Barrichello; 15. (Italy) Ivan Capelli; 15. (Belgium) Thierry Boutsen; 15. (Italy) Marco Apicella; 15. (Italy) Emanuele Naspetti; 15. (United Kingdom) Eddie Irvine
- Debut: 1993 South African Grand Prix
- Last event: 1993 Australian Grand Prix
| Races | Wins | Podiums | Poles | F/Laps |
|---|---|---|---|---|
| 16 | 0 | 0 | 0 | 0 |
- Constructors' Championships: 0
- Drivers' Championships: 0

The Jordan 193 was the car with which the Jordan team competed in the 1993 Formula One World Championship. The number 14 seat was taken by debutant Rubens Barrichello, while five different drivers occupied the number 15 seat over the course of the season: Ivan Capelli, Thierry Boutsen, Marco Apicella, Emanuele Naspetti and Eddie Irvine.

== Overview ==
After a disastrous 1992 season with underpowered and unreliable Yamaha V12 engine, the team took the decision to replace these with Brian Hart's independently built, and smaller V10 engines for 1993. The Hart 1035 engine was rated at around 700 bhp (522 kW; 710 PS) in 1993, and although this was an upgrade on the 660 bhp (492 kW; 669 PS) Yamaha's, it still compared unfavourably to the approximately 780 bhp (582 kW; 791 PS) of the Renault V10's powering the Williams and Ligier's, or the 740 bhp (552 kW; 750 PS) of the Ferrari V12. Though it did put the engine on par with the smaller capacity Ford V8 engines used by Benetton and McLaren (the Cosworth designed and built Ford engines were developments of those previously used by Jordan in their rookie F1 season in 1991).

The 193 differed greatly to its two predecessors, with a higher nose and very different front wing. Like most of the other cars that competed in the 1993 Championship, it had numerous electronic aids to assist the driver and improve the car's performance. Traction control was used throughout the season, as was the team's first semi-automatic gearbox. The gearbox caused numerous problems, as it often would jam in one gear. This occurred so much at the beginning of the season that the team replaced the semi automatic gearbox with a manual one until the semi was reliable enough to race. The car also lacked the active suspension used by the frontrunners and had too short a wheelbase, which caused instability in the rear for most of the year but was later lengthened in an attempt to find more speed. The net result was that the 193 was usually over three seconds per lap slower than the fastest cars, but was still a competent midfield runner.

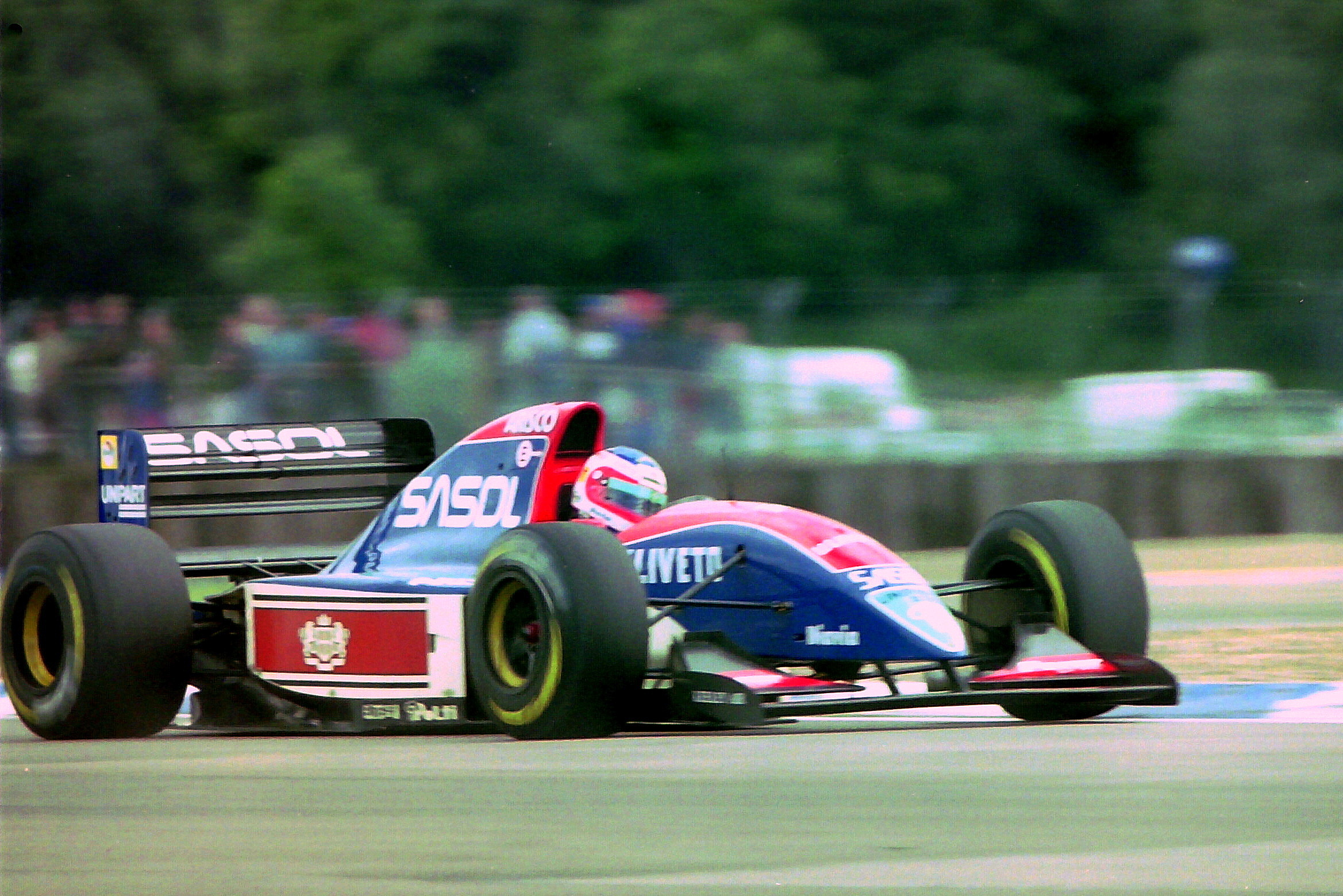
Barrichello at the British Grand Prix

No fewer than six drivers raced the car throughout the season, with only young rookie Rubens Barrichello competing in every race. Ivan Capelli, Thierry Boutsen, Marco Apicella, Emanuele Naspetti and Eddie Irvine all raced at some stage of the season. None of the drivers except Irvine were able to match Barrichello's pace. Boutsen, who drove the most races of the second drivers, was often around two seconds per lap slower than Barrichello.

Despite heavy revisions to the car throughout the year – such as improved aerodynamics, altered suspension, and more powerful engines – its relative performance stayed roughly the same. However, Barrichello was on course to finish third at the wet European Grand Prix, only to be denied by a fuel pressure problem in the closing laps. The team finally scored points at the Japanese Grand Prix, where Barrichello and debutant Irvine finished fifth and sixth respectively; Irvine made headlines at this race when he unlapped himself by passing leader and eventual winner Ayrton Senna, angering the triple World Champion so much that he punched Irvine after the race.

The team finished equal tenth in the Constructors' Championship with three points.

The 193 was replaced for 1994 by the 194.

== Livery ==
For the second year, Sasol was the team's main sponsor. Jordan used the Barclay logos, except at the French, British, German and European Grands Prix, when it was replaced with either the brand's emblem or their last names.

== Complete Formula One results ==
(key)

| Year | Entrant | Engine | Tyres | Drivers | 1 | 2 | 3 | 4 | 5 | 6 | 7 | 8 | 9 | 10 | 11 | 12 | 13 | 14 | 15 | 16 | Pts. | WCC |
|---|---|---|---|---|---|---|---|---|---|---|---|---|---|---|---|---|---|---|---|---|---|---|
| 1993 | Sasol Jordan | Hart 1035; V10 | G | | RSA | BRA | EUR | SMR | ESP | MON | CAN | FRA | GBR | GER | HUN | BEL | ITA | POR | JPN | AUS | 3 | 11th |
| 1993 | Sasol Jordan | Hart 1035; V10 | G | Rubens Barrichello | Ret | Ret | 10 | Ret | 12 | 9 | Ret | 7 | 10 | Ret | Ret | Ret | Ret | 13 | 5 | 11 | 3 | 11th |
| 1993 | Sasol Jordan | Hart 1035; V10 | G | Ivan Capelli | Ret | DNQ | | | | | | | | | | | | | | | 3 | 11th |
| 1993 | Sasol Jordan | Hart 1035; V10 | G | Thierry Boutsen | | | Ret | Ret | 11 | Ret | 12 | 11 | Ret | 13 | 9 | Ret | | | | | 3 | 11th |
| 1993 | Sasol Jordan | Hart 1035; V10 | G | Marco Apicella | | | | | | | | | | | | | Ret | | | | 3 | 11th |
| 1993 | Sasol Jordan | Hart 1035; V10 | G | Emanuele Naspetti | | | | | | | | | | | | | | Ret | | | 3 | 11th |
| 1993 | Sasol Jordan | Hart 1035; V10 | G | Eddie Irvine | | | | | | | | | | | | | | | 6 | Ret | 3 | 11th |
