= Jordan 195 =

Formula One racing car

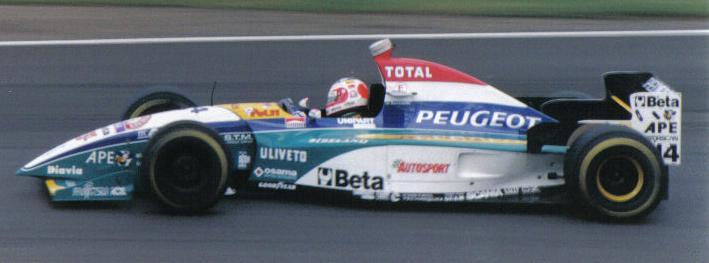
- Rubens Barrichello driving the 195 at the 1995 British Grand Prix
- Category: Formula One
- Constructor: Jordan
- Designers: Gary Anderson (Technical Director); Mark Smith (Senior Design Engineer - Transmission); Andrew Green (Senior Design Engineer - Suspension); John McQuilliam (Senior Design Engineer - Composites); Darren Davies (Head of Aerodynamics)
- Predecessor: 194
- Successor: 196

Technical specifications
- Chassis: carbon-fibre and honeycomb composite structure
- Suspension (front): Double wishbones, pushrod
- Suspension (rear): Double wishbones, pushrod
- Axle track: Front: 1,700 mm (67 in); Rear: 1,618 mm (63.7 in)
- Wheelbase: 2,950 mm (116 in)
- Engine: Peugeot A10 3,000 cc (183.1 cu in), 72° V10, NA, mid-engine, longitudinally mounted
- Transmission: Jordan 7-speed semi-automatic
- Power: 700–760 hp (520–570 kW) @ 15,500 rpm
- Weight: 595 kg (1,312 lb)
- Fuel: Total
- Tyres: Goodyear

Competition history
- Notable entrants: Total Jordan Peugeot
- Notable drivers: 14. (Brazil) Rubens Barrichello; 15. (United Kingdom) Eddie Irvine
- Debut: 1995 Brazilian Grand Prix
- Last event: 1995 Australian Grand Prix
Races	Wins	Podiums	Poles	F/Laps
17	0	2	0	0
- Teams' Championships: 0
- Constructors' Championships: 0
- Drivers' Championships: 0

The Jordan 195 was the Formula One car which the Jordan team competed in the 1995 Formula One World Championship.

== Overview ==
=== Design ===
The 195 featured a distinctive low nose and highly sculpted sidepods, lending it a very smooth appearance.

=== Engine ===
When McLaren ended their supply with Peugeot and entered a long term deal for engines from Mercedes, Jordan decided to switch from Hart to Peugeot engines. The engine itself was underpowered and unreliable compared with other competitors.

== Racing history ==
It achieved Jordan's then best-ever result at the Canadian Grand Prix, when Barrichello and Irvine finished second and third respectively behind Jean Alesi's Ferrari. However, the car was not consistently competitive and suffered numerous reliability problems, and the team ended up in sixth place in the Constructors' Championship.

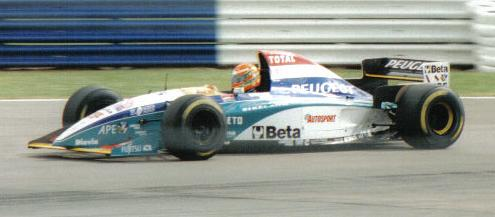
Eddie Irvine driving the 195 at the 1995 British Grand Prix.

== Livery ==
The 195 ran with a mixture of white, red, blue and yellow livery until the San Marino Grand Prix when most of the blue livery were replaced with aqua. Total served as the team's main sponsor for the season.

== Aftermath ==
In 1996, WRC champion Colin McRae test drove the 195 in 196 livery at the Silverstone Circuit.

== Complete Formula One results ==
(key) (results in bold indicate pole position)

Year	Team	Engine	Tyres	Drivers	1	2	3	4	5	6	7	8	9	10	11	12	13	14	15	16	17	Points	WCC
1995	Jordan	Peugeot V10	**G**		BRA	ARG	SMR	ESP	MON	CAN	FRA	GBR	GER	HUN	BEL	ITA	POR	EUR	PAC	JPN	AUS	**21**	**6th**
1995	Jordan	Peugeot V10	**G**	Rubens Barrichello	Ret	Ret	Ret	7	Ret	2	6	11	Ret	7	6	Ret	11	4	Ret	Ret	Ret	**21**	**6th**
1995	Jordan	Peugeot V10	**G**	Eddie Irvine	Ret	Ret	8	5	Ret	3	9	Ret	9	13	Ret	Ret	10	6	11	4	Ret	**21**	**6th**
