= Honda V10 engine =

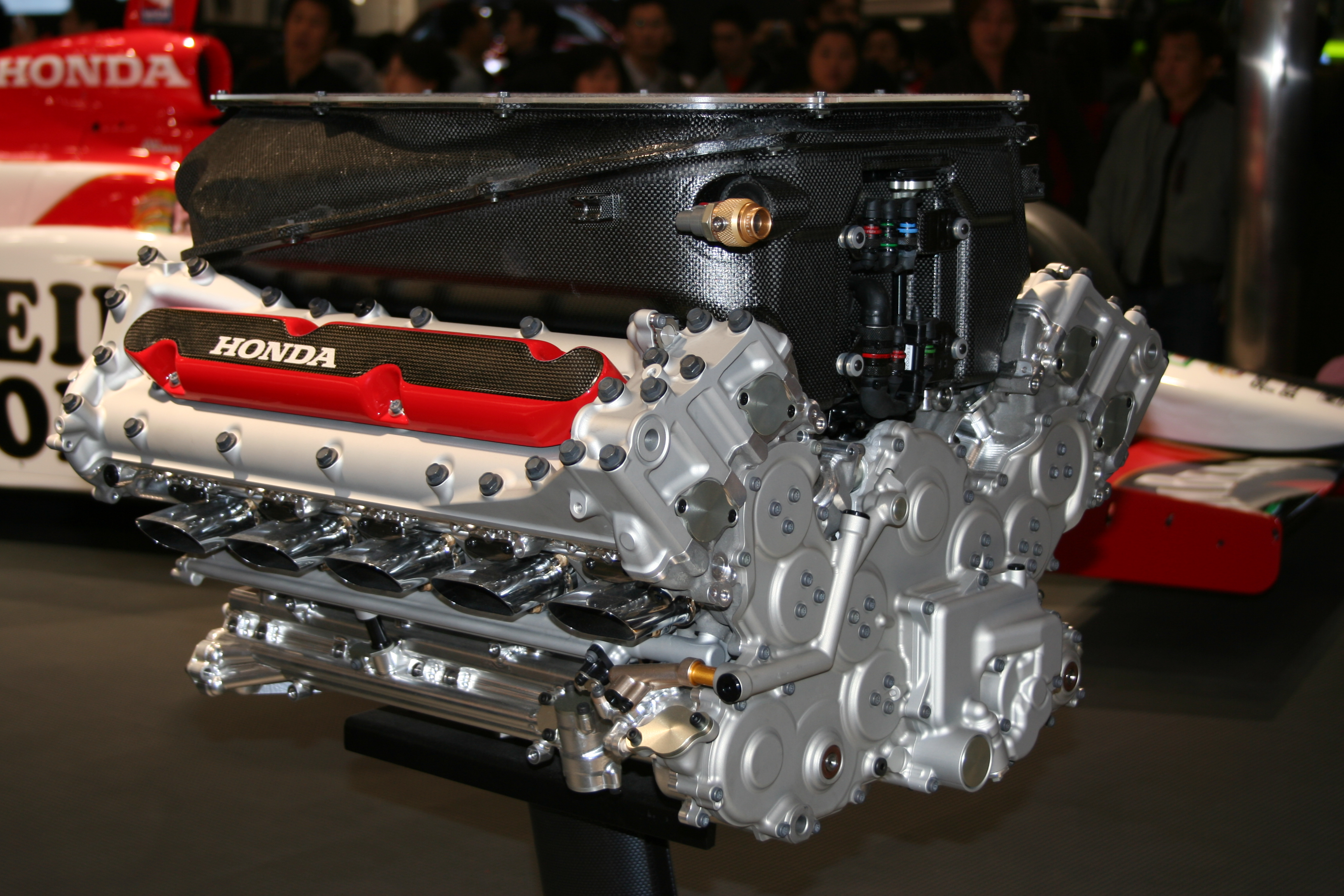

Overview
- Manufacturer: (Japan) Honda (1989–1990, 2000–2005) (Japan) Mugen (1992–2000)
- Designer: Osamu Goto (Chief designer) (1989–1990)
- Production: 1989–1990, 2000–2005

Layout
- Configuration: 72°-80°-90° V10
- Displacement: 3.5 L (3,493 cc); 3.5 L (3,498 cc); 3.0 L (2,996 cc); 3.0 L (2,994 cc)
- Cylinder bore: 92 mm (3.6 in) (72°); 93 mm (3.7 in); 94.4 mm (3.7 in); 95 mm (3.7 in) (80°); 97 mm (3.8 in) (90°)
- Piston stroke: 52.55 mm (2.1 in); 51.5 mm (2.0 in); 42.8 mm (1.7 in); 42.24 mm (1.7 in); 40.52 mm (1.6 in)

Combustion
- Fuel system: Electronic fuel injection
- Fuel type: Gasoline
- Cooling system: Water-cooled

Output
- Power output: 675–1,000 hp (503–746 kW; 684–1,014 PS)
- Torque output: 265–315 lb⋅ft (359–427 N⋅m)

Dimensions
- Dry weight: 89–160 kg (196.2–352.7 lb)

Chronology
- Predecessor: Honda RA16 engine Honda V12 engine
- Successor: Honda V8 F1 engine

The RA series of 3.5-litre and 3.0-litre, naturally-aspirated, V10 racing engines were made by Honda to compete in Formula One racing; between 1989 and 1990, and then again between 2000 and 2005. Between 1992 and 2000, the engines were also made by Mugen Honda. The customer engines were used by McLaren, Arrows, Lotus, Ligier, Tyrrell, Prost, and Jordan.

== Background ==
1989 was the first year where naturally aspirated engines were compulsory for all teams after the banning of the turbocharged units at the end of the previous season. To this end, Honda built a 3.5-litre V10 engine, developed throughout most of the latter half of 1987, and through 1988 with Williams, Lotus and McLaren.

1989 was McLaren's 4th Constructors' Championship of the 1980s following on from 1984, 1985 and 1988, making the team the equal leading constructor of the decade with Williams who won in 1980, 1981, 1986 and 1987. It was also Honda's 4th consecutive Constructors' Championship as an engine manufacturer, and McLaren's 5th Championship overall having won their first in 1974.

The engine for 1990 was tweaked and Senna did much development work to ensure he would have better reliability in the new season. He and Gerhard Berger took the fight to Prost and Ferrari in 1990, winning another six races and winning the Constructors' Championship.

At the time, all Honda F1 engines were returned to Japan immediately after each race to be dismantled and investigated to look for lessons for future engine development. The engines were normally disposed of after diagnosis. As a result, very few historic Honda Formula One engines still exist.

In 1991, McLaren switched to the V12 engine, and Tyrell received the 1990-spec V10s engines serviced by Mugen Motorsports, dubbed the RA101E; Satoru Nakajima and Stefano Modena were the drivers. The following year, these engines were renamed Mugen MF351H and were transferred to the Footwork team, with drivers Aguri Suzuki and Michele Alboreto. Although Honda withdrew from the sport at the end of 1992 season, Mugen remained affiliated with Footwork in 1993 and created a B version of the MF351H, used by Aguri Suzuki and Derek Warwick.

At the end of the year, Mugen switched to Team Lotus with plans for a new Lotus 109. The team - with drivers Johnny Herbert and Pedro Lamy (later replaced by Alessandro Zanardi) - was underfunded and the 109 chassis was late arriving. The Mugen engine, codenamed MF351HC (also known as ZA5C), was not able to show its full potential and failed to score a single World Championship point during 1994 despite coming close on 3 occasions. This was the only season in which Mugen engines (and Lotus) did not score a World Championship point during their time in Formula One.

After Lotus closed at the end of the year, Mugen switched to the Ligier team, which was then being run for Flavio Briatore by Tom Walkinshaw, with drivers Olivier Panis, Martin Brundle and Aguri Suzuki, although it was initially planned for the Minardi team. The 3.0 L engine, conforming to the new regulations, was codenamed MF301H. The 1995 season was promising with points being scored at nine races and the team securing two podiums, one courtesy of Brundle finishing third at the Belgian Grand Prix and the other by Panis finishing second at the Australian Grand Prix. The team secured 24 points and finished a respectable 5th in the Constructors Championship. The following season with Ligier resulted in Mugen's first Formula One victory as well as Ligier's last Formula One victory at the 1996 Monaco Grand Prix with Panis at the wheel. Despite this unexpected success, the Mugen powered Ligier car only scored three more points finishes during the rest of the season two 6th-place finishes from Diniz and one 5th-place finish from Panis; the team suffered 17 retirements during 1996.

Ligier was taken over by Alain Prost in 1997, and the newly named Prost Grand Prix ran MF301HB engines with Jarno Trulli leading the Austrian Grand Prix before suffering an engine failure. The Prost team managed two podium finishes during the 1997 season at Brazil and Spain, scoring points in 8 races over the season securing a final total of 21 points and a 6th-place finish in the Constructors Championship.

With Prost establishing a relationship with Peugeot and switching to them from 1998 onwards, Mugen looked for a new partner and reached a two-year agreement with Jordan Grand Prix for which Mugen produced the MF301HC engine. The first half of the 1998 season was an absolute disaster; it was so bad that at one point Mugen officials met with Eddie Jordan and his team during the 1998 Monaco Grand Prix to find out why up until then the team had failed to score a single World Championship point. The relationship continued at Silverstone where the team scored their first World Championship point of the season courtesy of a 6th-place finish from Ralf Schumacher, followed by points finishes at the next 3 races. It was not until Spa-Francorchamps, when Jordan's fortunes changed for the better with drivers Damon Hill and Ralf Schumacher scored a 1-2 finish securing Jordan's first ever Formula One victory and their only 1-2 finish during their existence after a crash-marred start. The team would score points on two further occasions with Ralf achieving a 3rd-place finish at the Italian Grand Prix. Gary Anderson would years later reveal that, by that season, Honda's headquarters had increased their involvement in developing the engines that otherwise still carry Mugen branding.

The 1999 season resulted in further success with Heinz-Harald Frentzen winning twice in France and Italy and even challenging for the title, although he failed in doing so due to better performance from McLaren and Ferrari. The following year, Honda returned as an engine supplier by themselves in 2000, as the sole engine supplier for British American Racing. They debuted with the 3.0-litre RA000E, in a partnership that would last six years, until they were bought out by Honda in 2006. Their best finish on return as an engine supplier was second in the Constructors' Championship in 2004. The arrival of full-works Honda engine supply in 2000 would result in Mugen leaving F1 at the end of the only two seasons (the other being 1992) where Honda and Mugen engines ran together on the grid, leaving Honda to supply engines to Jordan as well in 2001 and 2002.

Mugen-built V10 engines were also used for the RC101B/RC-F1 2.0X, a car built by the Honda R&D Center without direct support from Honda headquarters (previous cars built by the R&D Center used older Honda engines when they supplied engines for McLaren) and for the Honda RA099, an official Honda test car to prepare for Honda's factory engine supply operation.

== Applications ==
- McLaren MP4/5
- McLaren MP4/5B
- Tyrrell 020
- BAR 002
- BAR 003
- BAR 004
- BAR 005
- BAR 006
- BAR 007
- Jordan 198
- Jordan 199
- Jordan EJ10
- Jordan EJ11
- Jordan EJ12
- Footwork FA13
- Footwork FA14
- Ligier JS41
- Ligier JS43
- Prost JS45
- Lotus 107C
- Lotus 109
- Honda RC101B/RC-F1 2.0X (unofficial test car)
- Honda RA099 (test car)

== Grand Prix engine results ==
- 2 World Constructors' Championships.
- 2 World Drivers' Championships.
- 20 race wins.
- 30 pole positions.
- 66 podium finishes.

== Gallery ==
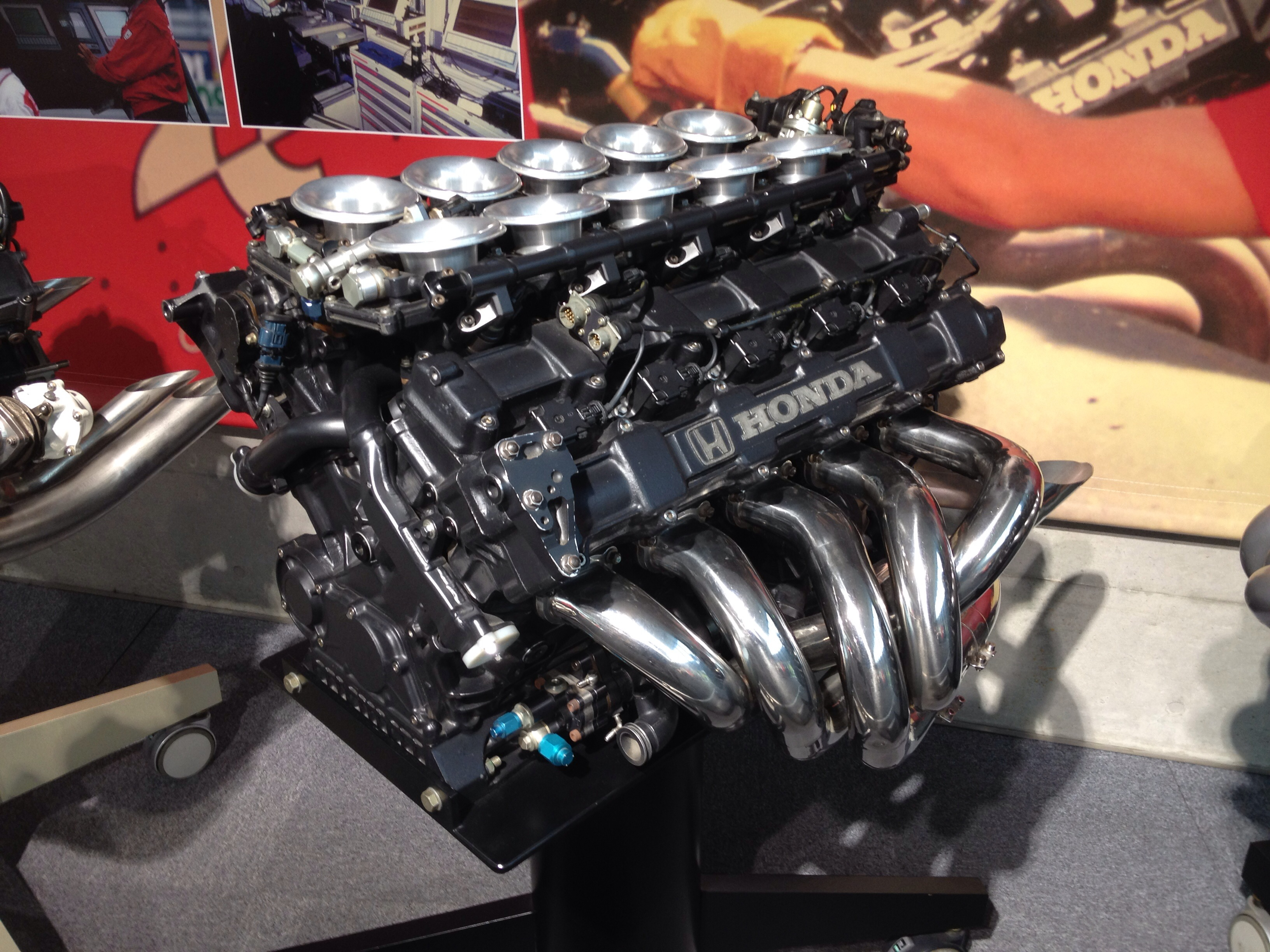
1989 Honda RA109E 3.5L V10 engine

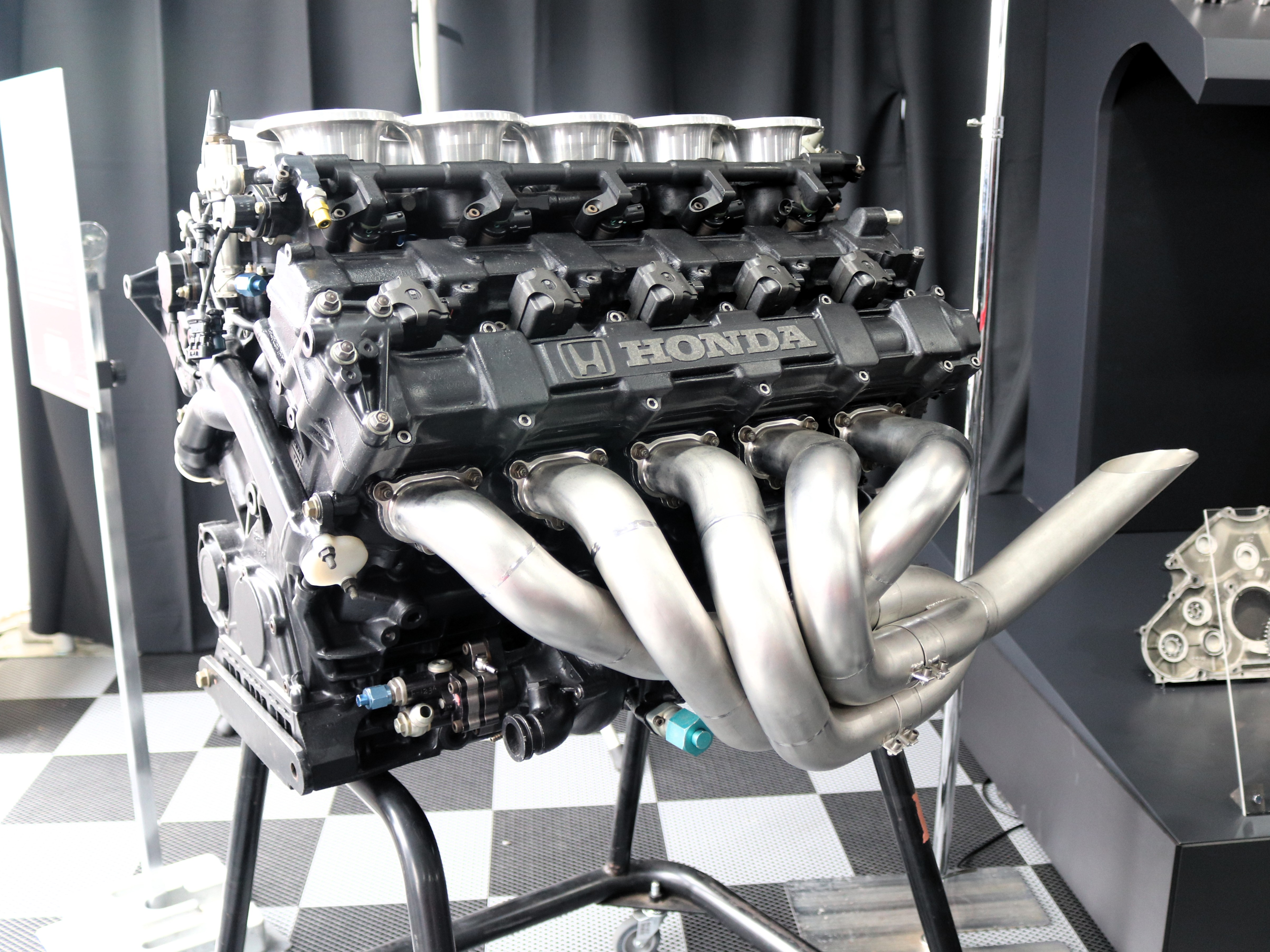
1990 Honda RA100E 3.5L V10 engine

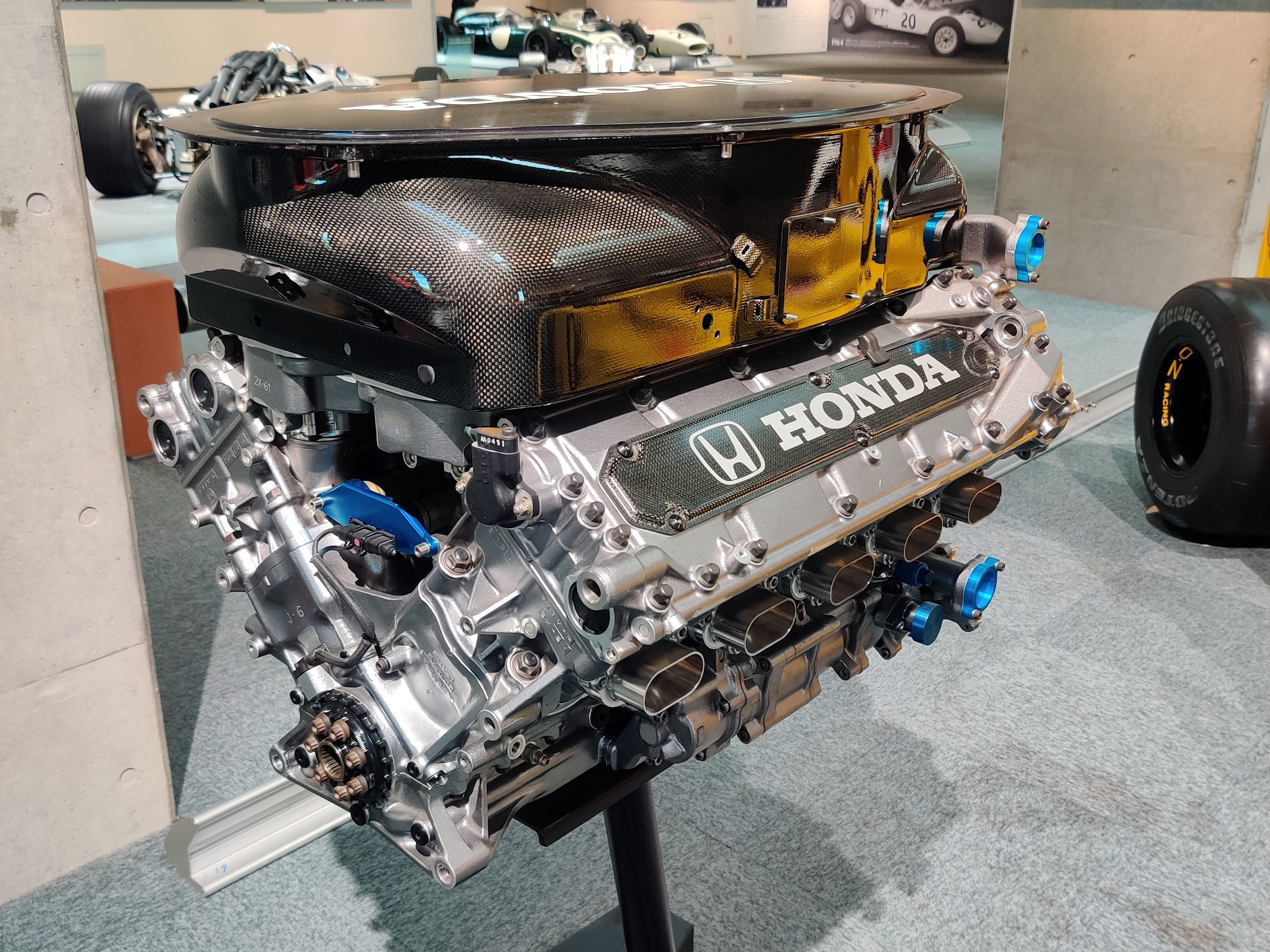
2000 Honda RA000E 3.0L V10 engine

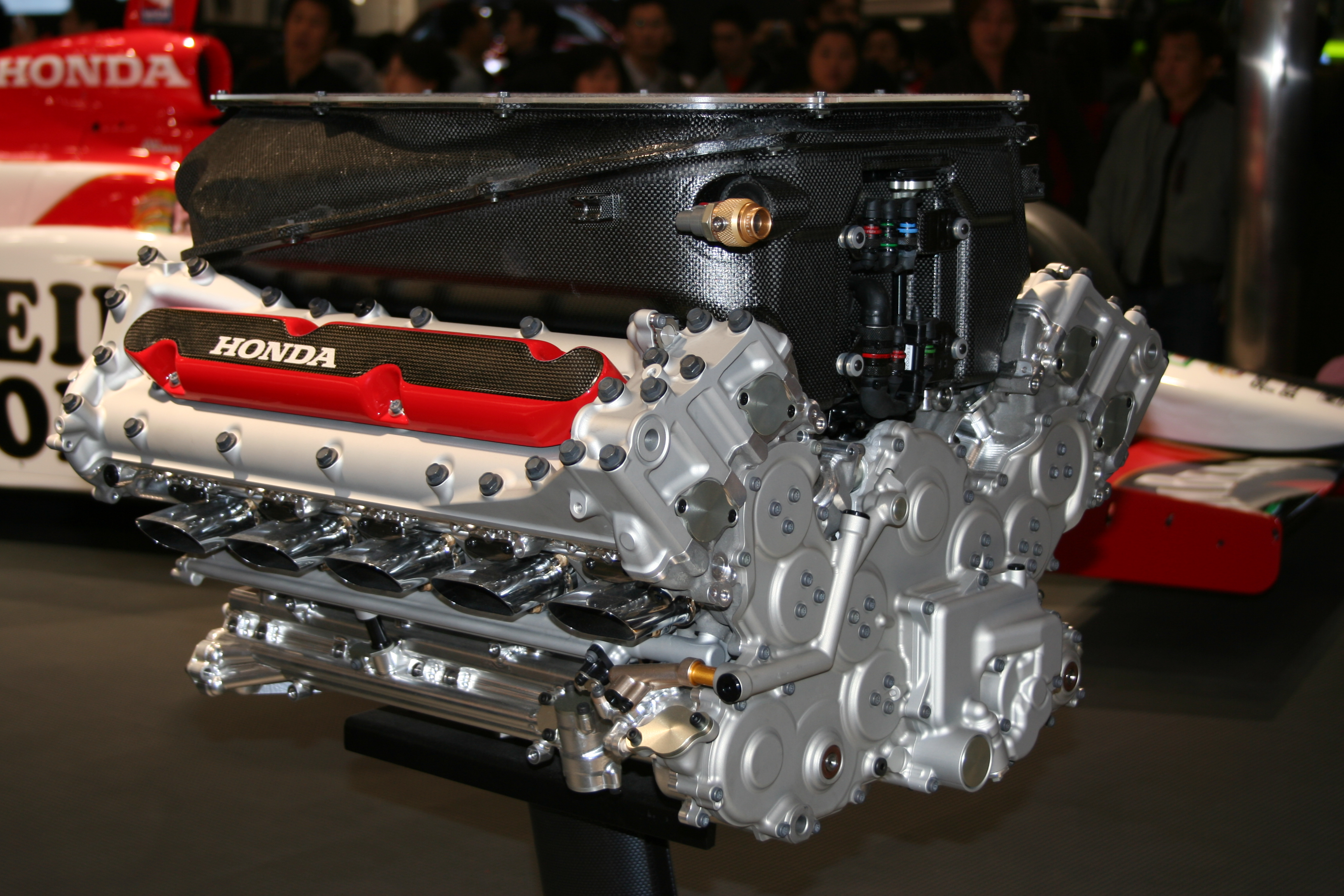
2005 Honda RA005E 3.0L V10 engine

== See also ==
- Renault RS engine
- Peugeot F1 engine
- Mercedes-Benz FO engine
- Ferrari V10 engine
- Petronas F1 engine
- Cosworth CR engine
- BMW E41 / P80 engine
- Asiatech F1 engine
- Toyota RVX engine
- Cosworth TJ / CA engine
