= Jordan EJ11 =

Formula One racing car

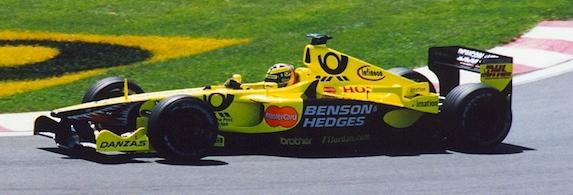
- Heinz-Harald Frentzen driving the EJ11 at the 2001 Canadian Grand Prix
- Category: Formula One
- Constructor: Jordan Grand Prix
- Designers: Eghbal Hamidy (Technical Director); Tim Holloway (Engineering Director); Mark Smith (Chief Designer); Bob Bell (Technology Director); John McQuilliam (Head of Composite Design); Ian Hall (Head of Transmission Design); Mike Wroe (Head of Electronics); John Iley (Head of Aerodynamics)
- Predecessor: EJ10B
- Successor: EJ12

Technical specifications
- Chassis: Carbon fibre monocoque
- Suspension (front): Double wishbones, pushrod-operated rockers
- Suspension (rear): Double wishbones, pushrod-operated rockers
- Axle track: Front: 1,500 mm (59 in); Rear: 1,418 mm (55.8 in)
- Engine: Honda RA001E, 3,000 cc (183.1 cu in), 82° V10, NA, mid-engine, longitudinally-mounted
- Transmission: Jordan 7-speed longitudinal, semi-automatic
- Power: 800 hp (596.6 kW) @ 17,000 rpm
- Fuel: Elf
- Tyres: Bridgestone

Competition history
- Notable entrants: B&H Jordan Honda
- Notable drivers: 11. (Germany) Heinz-Harald Frentzen; 11. (Brazil) Ricardo Zonta; 12. (France) Jean Alesi; 11./12. (Italy) Jarno Trulli
- Debut: 2001 Australian Grand Prix
- Last event: 2001 Japanese Grand Prix
Races	Wins	Podiums	Poles	F/Laps
17	0	0	0	0
- Constructors' Championships: 0
- Drivers' Championships: 0

The Jordan EJ11 was the car with which the Jordan team competed in the 2001 Formula One World Championship.

== Background ==
The car was different from its disappointing predecessor, the Jordan EJ10. The EJ11 now had seven gears instead of the previous car's six, and also featured a much higher nose (resulting in a shark-based livery). But, most notably, the team now had full-works Honda engines (the same engine as it was used by BAR 003), replacing the Mugen Honda engines used for the previous three years. This put the team into direct competition with fellow-Honda users British American Racing.

Much was expected of the EJ11. After the disappointing 2000 season, where the team finished only sixth in the Constructors' Championship, the EJ11 was expected to return the team to the very front of the grid. The car was very fast in pre-season testing, regularly topping the time sheets at many tracks. The team's lead driver, Heinz-Harald Frentzen, claimed it was the best car he had ever driven, and that he could become champion driving it. Jarno Trulli, the team's other driver, was equally optimistic. Many predicted that the EJ11 would be close behind Ferrari and McLaren in the fight for the title honours.

== Season results ==
At the season opener in Australia, Frentzen qualified a strong fourth with Trulli not far behind in seventh. Frentzen ran in third place early on, but was knocked off the track in a collision with Rubens Barrichello's Ferrari. In a strong comeback drive, the German finished sixth, and was promoted to fifth when arch-rivals BAR had one of their cars penalised for overtaking under a yellow flag. Trulli drove strongly and looked set for third when his hydraulics failed, putting him out of the race.

At the very next round in Malaysia, Trulli was third after the first lap. When the circuit was doused by a thunderstorm, he briefly held the lead before spinning off and dropping back down the order. Frentzen survived the rainstorm and finished a strong fourth, beating the Williams of Ralf Schumacher and the McLaren of Mika Häkkinen in the process.

The trend of strong qualifying but inferior race pace continued in Brazil, where the team threw away the chance for a podium after both cars pitted on the same lap to change tyres in wet conditions. Frentzen retired from third with an electrical problem with eight laps to go, which promoted Trulli to the same position. The wrong choice of tyres, however, would see him passed by Nick Heidfeld's Sauber and Olivier Panis' BAR in the closing laps.

Trulli once again qualified near the head of the field at Imola, and made a quick start to run third in the opening laps. His race pace was not strong, and a queue of faster cars soon developed behind him. Jarno would drop to fifth behind the faster Ferraris, Williamses and McLarens, with Frentzen finishing immediately behind in sixth. This would be the team's only double-points finish in the course of the season.

The Spanish Grand Prix saw Trulli finish fourth, but the team were left disappointed that they had been beaten by BAR, with Jacques Villeneuve finishing in third place. In a straight fight the team were beaten by their rivals. Frentzen's race was compromised when his launch control failed, and he collided with Pedro de la Rosa whilst climbing back up through the field.

The next two races at Austria and Monaco would see double retirements. Embarrassingly, neither car left the grid in Austria, when Trulli's launch control failed and Frentzen's gearbox failed. Trulli managed to get going again in the pits but left the pit lane under a red light. He was promptly black flagged and disqualified. In an attempt to improve front end downforce, an elevated front wing was tried in practice at Monaco, which was immediately banned by the FIA on safety grounds. In Monaco, a possible podium finish was lost due to Trulli retiring from fifth with an engine failure, and Frentzen crashed heavily exiting the tunnel.

Frentzen again crashed in the practice session for the Canadian Grand Prix. He subsequently complained of dizziness and headaches, and was replaced for the race by the team's test driver, Ricardo Zonta. Once again the EJ11 performed well in qualifying, but was unable to keep the same pace up in the race. Trulli however once again looked set for a strong finish and maybe a podium when his brake master cylinder failed. Zonta finished a disappointing 7th, outside the points positions.

The EJ11s qualified on the fourth row of the grid at the Nürburgring, but did not achieve a good result during the race, with both cars retiring whilst running outside the points-paying positions. Trulli retired with a transmission problem and Frentzen retired due to a fault with his traction control.

The team were becoming frustrated with Frentzen's lack of pace in the EJ11, as he had been out qualified by Trulli in all but one race, and had scored fewer points than the Italian. Trulli had a steady race at Magny-Cours and finished in 5th, whilst Frentzen was off his team-mate's pace and finished only 8th, behind both Saubers.

Things looked up for the team at their home Grand Prix at Silverstone. The cars were fourth and fifth on the grid, but Trulli wasted his chance by colliding with David Coulthard's McLaren at the first corner. Frentzen was again beaten by the Sauber C20s, and finished seventh. Eddie Jordan had had enough, and Frentzen was fired from the team following the race. In an interview with The Sunday Independent in 2005, Jordan later claimed that Frentzen was sacked because engine supplier Honda wanted Japanese driver Takuma Sato to race for Jordan in 2002 and to retain Honda's engine supply.

At this stage, the team were only fifth in the Constructors' Championship with 15 points, behind Sauber, with a much smaller budget and without manufacturer backing, who had 19. The cars were off the pace again in Germany, with a double retirement ending a miserable day. Trulli may have finished on the podium, but spun in the course of a battle with Villeneuve, who went on to finish third while Trulli later retired with hydraulic failure. Zonta, again substituting for Frentzen, collided with Jos Verstappen's Arrows early on.

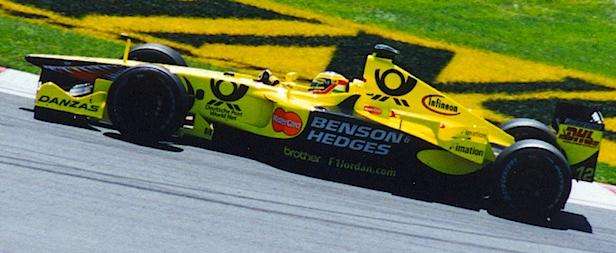
Jarno Trulli driving the EJ11 at the 2001 Canadian GP.

A major aerodynamic upgrade came for the next Grand Prix in Hungary. A large amount of time and money had been used on the first upgrade of the season. Jean Alesi also joined the team in a surprise move after leaving the Prost team (Frentzen, ironically, would take his vacated seat for the balance of the season). Trulli started fifth, but gradually fell back and retired outside of the points after holding up a huge queue of cars early on. Alesi had a steady drive to a mere tenth after a poor qualifying performance and equally poor start. The team were now despairing, as the upgrade had made no difference to the car's performance, and the team were now sixth in the championship, behind BAR and Sauber, despite having the potentially faster car.

Spa produced some reward for the team, with Alesi scoring a point for sixth in a chaotic race. However, this was achieved at the expense of Trulli, who retired from fifth place when his engine failed with only a few laps to go.

Trulli had his fifth successive retirement at Monza after he was taken out at the first turn by Jenson Button's late-braking Benetton. It was another waste of a strong top six qualifying effort. Alesi finished a distant eighth, behind Villeneuve's BAR and Kimi Räikkönen's Sauber.

Things came good again at the penultimate round of the championship, held in the USA. Trulli finished fourth, with Alesi finishing his 200th Grand Prix in seventh. However, Jarno was disqualified from the results after a technical infringement was found on his car. However, in an appeal held after the season had finished the team won the case and had Trulli's result reinstated. This was a crucial victory off the track, as it raised the team back up to fifth in the Constructors' Championship, and back ahead of BAR.

The final race at Suzuka saw the team's final effort to score the three points it needed to finish 4th in the Constructors' Championship, ahead of Sauber. It was also Alesi's final race, and an opportunity to achieve a 100% finishing record through the season. Alesi topped the timesheets in Friday Free Practice, but retired from the race after colliding with Räikkönen. Trulli was not on the pace, driving to a pointless eighth position in what would be his last race for the team.

== Sponsorship and livery ==
As in previous years, the basic color of the car was yellow; Front and rear fenders, T-Cam and side pads were black. The main sponsor remained the tobacco brand Benson & Hedges, which advertised on both fenders, the nose, the side boxes and the driver's helmet.

Jordan used 'Benson & Hedges' logos, except at the French, British and United States Grands Prix, which was replaced with "Bitten Heroes". This was a reference to the stylized drawing of a shark on the nose and the fin on the side of the car, which had replaced the Hornet since 1998 and the accompanying lettering "Buzzin Hornets".

After the September 11 attacks, the team raced in Italian and United States Grands Prix, where the American flag was on the engine cover. Alesi also raced at the same event and had "200" written on the side soles, which was his 200th race start. Trulli's helmet featured an American flag and had "God Bless America" and "Peace No War".

== Other ==
British television star Ross Kemp joined Jordan as a "truck driver" at the Austrian, French and British Grands Prix. His apprenticeship with Jordan was filmed by ITV F1 for a special television feature. At the British Grand Prix he was responsible for the exhaust shield, which prevents fuel from splashing into the exhaust during refueling, for both of Heinz-Harald Frentzen's pit stops.

== Complete Formula One results ==
(key) (results in bold indicate pole position)

Year	Team	Engine	Tyres	Drivers	1	2	3	4	5	6	7	8	9	10	11	12	13	14	15	16	17	Points	WCC
2001	Jordan	Honda V10	**B**		AUS	MAL	BRA	SMR	ESP	AUT	MON	CAN	EUR	FRA	GBR	GER	HUN	BEL	ITA	USA	JPN	19	5th
2001	Jordan	Honda V10	**B**	(Germany) Heinz-Harald Frentzen	5	4	11^{†}	6	Ret	Ret	Ret	PO	Ret	8	7							19	5th
2001	Jordan	Honda V10	**B**	(Brazil) Ricardo Zonta								7				Ret						19	5th
2001	Jordan	Honda V10	**B**	(France) Jean Alesi													10	6	8	7	Ret	19	5th
2001	Jordan	Honda V10	**B**	(Italy) Jarno Trulli	Ret	8	5	5	4	DSQ	Ret	11^{†}	Ret	5	Ret	Ret	Ret	Ret	Ret	4	8	19	5th
