= Jordan 198 =

Formula One racing car

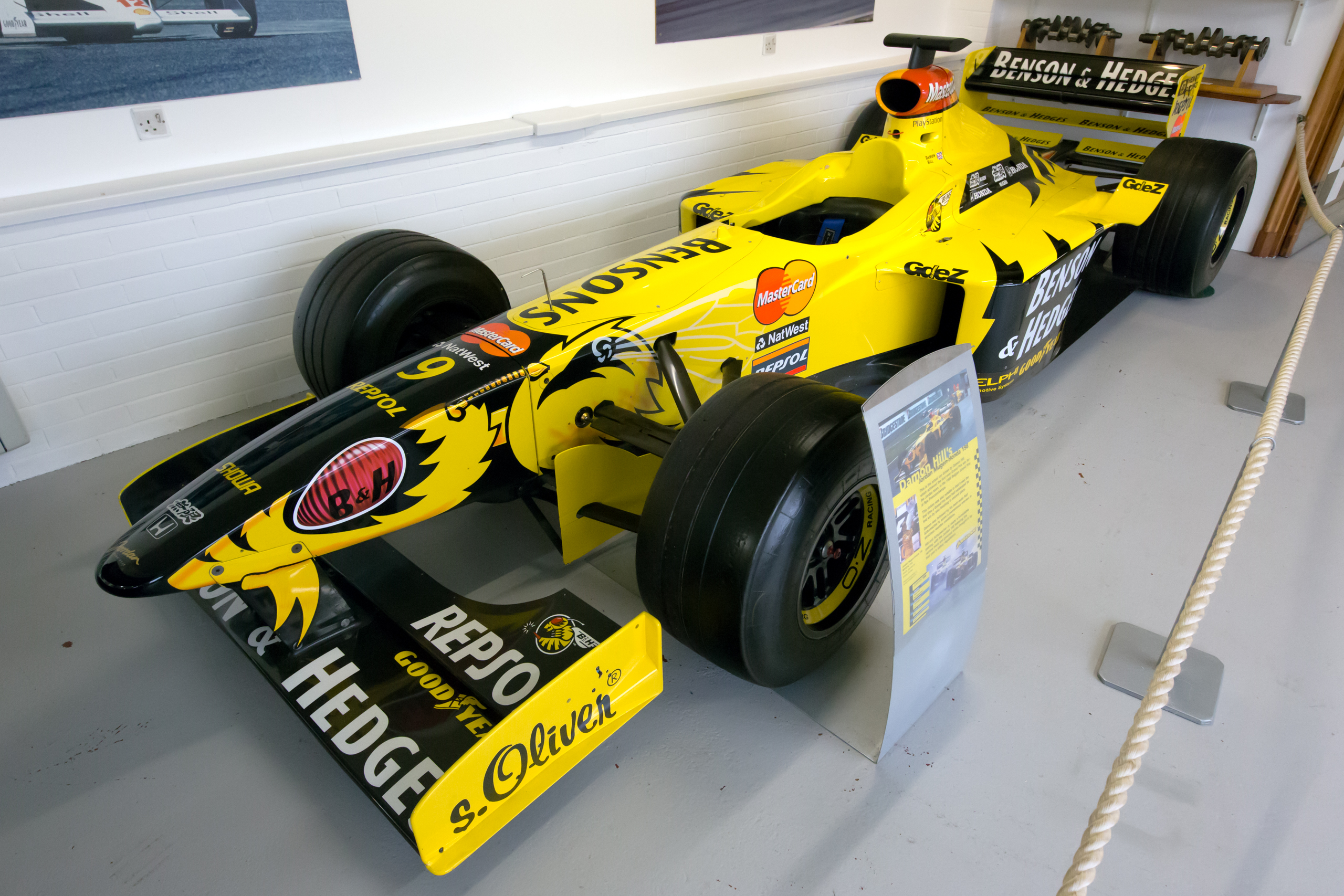
- Damon Hill's Belgian GP winning car on display at the Donington Grand Prix Collection
- Category: Formula One
- Constructor: Jordan
- Designers: Gary Anderson (Technical Director); Mark Smith (Chief Designer); Paul Crooks (Design Coordinator); John McQuilliam (Head of Composite Design); Ian Hall (Head of Transmission Design); John Davis (Head of R&D); John Iley (Head of Aerodynamics)
- Predecessor: 197
- Successor: 199

Technical specifications
- Chassis: Carbon-fibre and honeycomb composite structure
- Suspension (front): Unequal-length double wishbones, pushrod-operated rockers
- Suspension (rear): Unequal-length double wishbones, pushrod-operated rockers
- Axle track: Front: 1,480 mm (58 in); Rear: 1,420 mm (56 in)
- Engine: Mugen-Honda MF-310HC, 3,000 cc (183.1 cu in), 72° V10, NA, mid-engine, longitudinally-mounted
- Transmission: Jordan 6-speed sequential semi-automatic
- Power: 690 hp (515 kW) @ 13,800 rpm
- Weight: 600 kg (1,300 lb)
- Fuel: Elf (Note: Despite Repsol YPF is an oil and gas company as a major sponsor of Jordan Grand Prix since 1998 season, the Repsol YPF branding appears on the Jordan 198, but the car uses Elf fuel and lubricants.)
- Tyres: Goodyear

Competition history
- Notable entrants: Benson & Hedges Jordan
- Notable drivers: 9. (United Kingdom) Damon Hill; 10. (Germany) Ralf Schumacher
- Debut: 1998 Australian Grand Prix
- First win: 1998 Belgian Grand Prix
- Last win: 1998 Belgian Grand Prix
- Last event: 1998 Japanese Grand Prix
Races	Wins	Podiums	Poles	F/Laps
16	1	3	0	0
- Constructors' Championships: 0
- Drivers' Championships: 0

The Jordan 198 was the Formula One car with which the Jordan team competed in the 1998 Formula One World Championship. It was driven by 1996 World Champion Damon Hill, who had moved from Arrows, and Ralf Schumacher, who was in his second season with the team. Test driver Pedro de la Rosa also drove the Jordan 198 during test sessions in 1998.

== Overview ==
The 198 ran promisingly in pre-season testing, however the car struggled in the early part of the season. Damon Hill complained of understeer and the Mugen Honda engine was down on power. After Jordan failed to score a point in the first half of the season, Gary Anderson left the team and Eddie Jordan hired Mike Gascoyne to rework the car. Numerous improvements were made to the 198's suspension, front wing and floor, while Mugen developed the engine. Further tyre development work by Goodyear enabled the team to enjoy a resurgence, scoring points in every race bar one in the second half of the season. This included Hill taking their first F1 victory at the Belgian Grand Prix, with Schumacher second. Schumacher also finished third in Italy, while Hill was fourth on three occasions. The team ultimately finished fourth in the Constructors' Championship with 34 points, four behind Williams in third and one ahead of Benetton in fifth.

== Sponsorship and livery ==
For the third consecutive year, Benson & Hedges was the team's main sponsor. The 198 featured a bright yellow "hornet" livery, with a hornet's eye and head painted on the either side of the nosecone; wings and stripes on the side of the car. Jordan used Benson & Hedges logos, except at the French, British and German Grands Prix, where they were replaced with "Buzzin' Hornets".

Additionally, the team was able to gain the MasterCard sponsorship on the airbox following the withdrawal of the Lola based team from the previous season.

== Complete Formula One results ==
(key) (results in bold indicate pole position)

Year	Team	Engine	Tyres	Drivers	1	2	3	4	5	6	7	8	9	10	11	12	13	14	15	16	Points	WCC
1998	Benson & Hedges Jordan	Mugen Honda V10	**G**		AUS	BRA	ARG	SMR	ESP	MON	CAN	FRA	GBR	AUT	GER	HUN	BEL	ITA	LUX	JPN	**34**	**4th**
1998	Benson & Hedges Jordan	Mugen Honda V10	**G**	Damon Hill	8	DSQ	8	10	Ret	8	Ret	Ret	Ret	7	4	4	1	6	9	4	**34**	**4th**
1998	Benson & Hedges Jordan	Mugen Honda V10	**G**	Ralf Schumacher	Ret	Ret	Ret	7	11	Ret	Ret	16	6	5	6	9	2	3	Ret	Ret	**34**	**4th**
