= Jordan EJ12 =

Formula One racing car

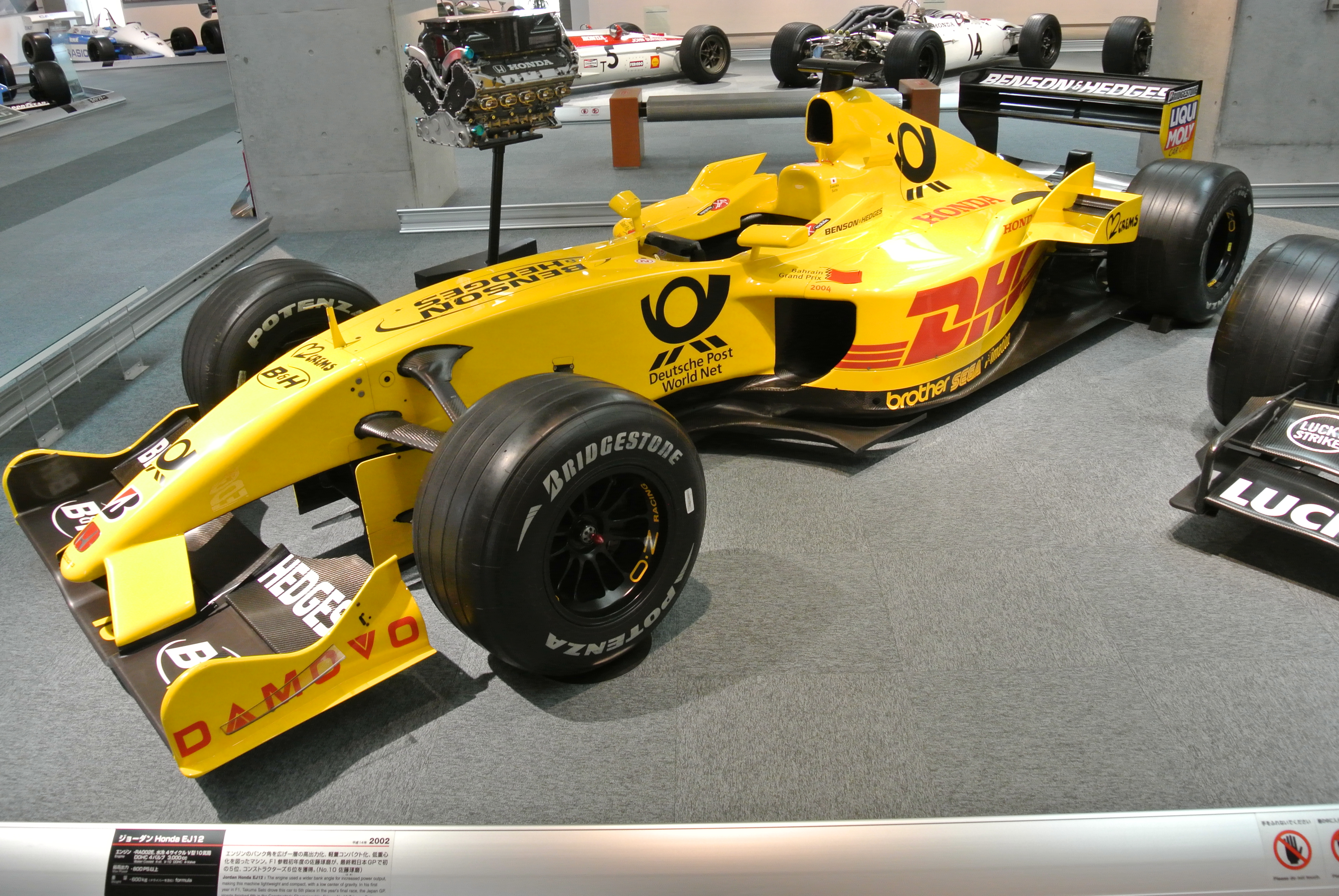
- The EJ12 on display at the Honda Collection Hall
- Category: Formula One
- Constructor: Jordan
- Designers: Eghbal Hamidy (Technical Director); Gary Anderson (Sporting Director); Tim Holloway (Engineering Director); John McQuilliam (Chief Designer); Stephen Taylor (Head of Composite Design); Ian Hall (Head of Transmission Design); Mike Wroe (Head of Electronics); Jon Tomlinson (Senior Aerodynamicist)
- Predecessor: EJ11
- Successor: EJ13

Technical specifications
- Chassis: Carbon fiber monocoque
- Suspension (front): double wishbones, pushrod-activated torsion bars
- Suspension (rear): double wishbones, pushrod-activated torsion bars
- Wheelbase: 3,124 mm (123.0 in)
- Engine: Honda RA002E, 3,000 cc (183.1 cu in), 108° V10, NA, mid-engine, longitudinally mounted
- Transmission: Jordan 7-speed longitudinal, semi-automatic
- Power: 835 hp (622.7 kW) @ 18,200 rpm
- Fuel: Elf
- Lubricants: Petrobras LuBRax
- Tyres: Bridgestone

Competition history
- Notable entrants: DHL Jordan Honda
- Notable drivers: 9. (Italy) Giancarlo Fisichella; 10. (Japan) Takuma Sato
- Debut: 2002 Australian Grand Prix
- Last event: 2002 Japanese Grand Prix
Races	Wins	Podiums	Poles	F/Laps
17	0	0	0	0
- Constructors' Championships: 0
- Drivers' Championships: 0

The Jordan EJ12 was the car with which the Jordan team competed in the 2002 Formula One World Championship. The car was driven by Italian Giancarlo Fisichella, who returned to the team after four seasons at Benetton, and Japanese debutant Takuma Sato.

== History ==
The EJ12 incorporated heavy design revisions to the front of the chassis compared to the preceding EJ11, therefore requiring a re-packaged front suspension system. New materials and production techniques were utilised in the chassis to further reduce weight and the centre of gravity position, with the revised side-pods making the side impact structures smaller, but more efficient.

Due to a drop in sponsorship money the team slipped backwards. Fisichella often exceeded the car's abilities in qualifying, a sixth place on the grid for Montreal surprising many onlookers. Yet results-wise, the Italian had to make do with a trio of fifth places and a final point from Hungary. Sato showed flashes of speed, but managed just two points, at Suzuka. Despite the drop in form, Jordan still managed sixth in the championship with nine points, ahead of BAR. However, it was not enough to retain the works Honda package, with the Japanese manufacturer having long announced before the end of the season that they would be concentrating solely on their partnership with BAR from 2003 onwards.

== Sponsorship and livery ==
DHL become the team's co-main sponsor, along with Benson & Hedges. DHL's sponsorship of the team lasted only a year.

Jordan used the Benson & Hedges logos, except at the British, French and United States Grands Prix; which was replaced with text "Be on Edge" (Benson & Hedges minus the 'n', 's','&', 'H' and 's').

At the European Grand Prix, Fisichella drove the 100th race of his career and the car's side pontoon bore the text "Fisico 100".

== Post-competition ==
As of 2023, the EJ12 chassis number 1, driven by Sato, is in the ownership of a driving experience company called Drift Limits. Drift Limits owner Jonathan Barden and instructor David Went both drove this car at the 2023 British Grand Prix race weekend during the historic demo.

== Complete Formula One results ==
(key) (results in bold indicate pole position)

Year	Team	Engine	Tyres	Drivers	1	2	3	4	5	6	7	8	9	10	11	12	13	14	15	16	17	Points	WCC
2002	Jordan	Honda V10	**B**		AUS	MAL	BRA	SMR	ESP	AUT	MON	CAN	EUR	GBR	FRA	GER	HUN	BEL	ITA	USA	JPN	9	6th
2002	Jordan	Honda V10	**B**	(Italy) Giancarlo Fisichella	Ret	13	Ret	Ret	Ret	5	5	5	Ret	7	DNQ	Ret	6	Ret	8	7	Ret	9	6th
2002	Jordan	Honda V10	**B**	(Japan) Takuma Sato	Ret	9	9	Ret	Ret	Ret	Ret	10	16	Ret	Ret	8	10	11	12	11	5	9	6th
