= Jordan 199 =

Formula One racing car

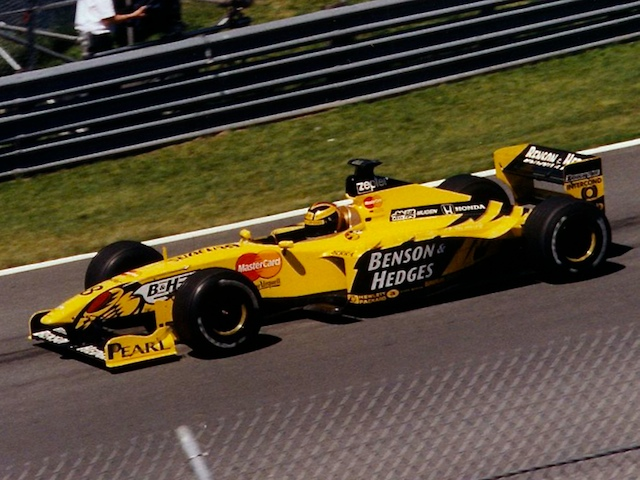
- Heinz-Harald Frentzen driving the 199 at the 1999 Canadian Grand Prix
- Category: Formula One
- Constructor: Jordan Grand Prix
- Designers: Mike Gascoyne (Technical Director); Mark Smith (Chief Designer); Bob Bell (Technology Director); John McQuilliam (Head of Composite Design); Ian Hall (Head of Transmission Design); John Davis (Head of R&D); John Iley (Head of Aerodynamics)
- Predecessor: 198
- Successor: EJ10

Technical specifications
- Chassis: Moulded carbon fibre composite structure
- Suspension (front): Double wishbones, pushrod-operated rockers
- Suspension (rear): Double wishbones, pushrod-operated rockers
- Axle track: Front: 1,500 mm (59 in); Rear: 1,418 mm (55.8 in)
- Wheelbase: 3,050 mm (120.1 in)
- Engine: Mugen-Honda MF-301HD, 2,999 cc (183.0 cu in), 72° V10, NA, mid-engine, longitudinally-mounted
- Transmission: Jordan 6-speed sequential semi-automatic
- Power: 680 hp @ 15,000 rpm
- Weight: 600 kg (1,323 lb) (inc. driver.)
- Fuel: Elf
- Tyres: Bridgestone

Competition history
- Notable entrants: Benson & Hedges Jordan
- Notable drivers: 7. (United Kingdom) Damon Hill; 8. (Germany) Heinz-Harald Frentzen
- Debut: 1999 Australian Grand Prix
- First win: 1999 French Grand Prix
- Last win: 1999 Italian Grand Prix
- Last event: 1999 Japanese Grand Prix
Races	Wins	Podiums	Poles	F/Laps
16	2	6	1	0
- Constructors' Championships: 0
- Drivers' Championships: 0

The Jordan 199 was the car with which the Jordan team competed in the 1999 Formula One World Championship. It was driven by 1996 World Champion Damon Hill, who had won the team's first Grand Prix in Belgium the previous season, and Heinz-Harald Frentzen, who was swapped with Williams in favour of Ralf Schumacher. The car was also driven by test drivers Tomáš Enge and Shinji Nakano. It was designed by technical director Mike Gascoyne and his assistant Tim Holloway.

It proved to be Jordan's most successful car in its fifteen-year history, scoring two wins, a pole position and third place in the Constructors' Championship. Frentzen also had a realistic shot of winning the Drivers' Championship, in what would prove to be his most successful season as well.

For Hill the year was not so good. Comprehensively out-performed throughout the season by Frentzen, he decided to retire during the course of the year and could only score seven points towards the team's eventual tally of 61.

== Design ==
The 199 was a developed version of the Jordan 198 but featured better aerodynamics after extensive wind tunnel work. The car used a mid-mounted, naturally aspirated Mugen-Honda MF-301HD 3.0 L V10 engine, Elf fuel and oil, Penske shock absorbers, Brembo carbon disc brakes, Bridgestone tyres and their own six-speed sequential semi-automatic gearbox.

The 199 replaced the 198, which had brought Eddie Jordan's team their first win at the Belgian Grand Prix. The car had finished fourth in the championship.

== Livery ==
For 1999, the hornet design was updated and the hornet stripes were updated on the back of the car. Jordan used Benson & Hedges logos, except at the French, British and Belgian Grands Prix, where they were replaced with "Buzzin' Hornets", tying in with the bee design at the front of the liveries.

== Season review ==
The season began well in Australia, as Frentzen and Hill qualified fifth and ninth. Hill made a brilliant start, but a collision with Jarno Trulli's Prost ended his race at turn 3. Frentzen was up to fourth after Rubens Barrichello's Stewart caught fire on the grid. As the leading McLarens of David Coulthard and Mika Häkkinen dropped out with technical problems, Frentzen was left in 2nd behind Ferrari's Eddie Irvine. The German had a chance to take the lead during the pitstops but the Ferrari crew got Irvine out in front. Frentzen finished second, ahead of Ralf Schumacher's Williams.

Hill out qualified Frentzen at the next race in Brazil, as the Jordans were 7th and 8th. Frentzen had the better start, however, and was up to 6th, while Hill was down to 8th. The Englishman was eliminated by a collision early on again, but this one was his fault. As he tried to overtake Alexander Wurz's Benetton at the first corner, he hit the Austrian on the inside, eliminating them both. Frentzen, meanwhile, was passed by Jean Alesi in the Sauber on lap 19 but took his 6th place back when the Frenchman retired with a gearbox failure. The German continued to make up places, profiting from Giancarlo Fisichella's clutch failure. He was able to pass Irvine during the pitstops and then inherited Barrichello's third place when the Brazilian's engine failed. This second consecutive podium left Frentzen and Jordan in 2nd place in both championships, behind Irvine and Ferrari and equal with Häkkinen and McLaren.

Round three was the San Marino Grand Prix at Imola. The Jordans once again qualified 7th and 8th, this time with Frentzen ahead of Hill. They left the grid in 6th and 8th, after Frentzen passed the stricken BAR of Jacques Villeneuve. Hill was passed by the flying Ralf Schumacher and so remained 8th. They moved up to 5th and 7th on lap 18 after race leader Mika Häkkinen crashed at the final corner. After the pit stops they were 5th and 6th due to the retirement of Ralf Schumacher with an engine failure. They also passed Barrichello, as the Brazilian was on a different strategy. On lap 47, Eddie Irvine had an engine failure, seemingly a good thing for Jordan. However, Frentzen spun on the Irishman's oil and his race was over. Hill then inherited 3rd place, but was quickly passed by a recovering Barrichello and finished a respectable 4th for his first points of the year. This left Frentzen and Jordan each in 3rd, with Hill now 9th in the championship.

Qualifying was not such a success around the twisty streets of Monaco, with Hill only managing 17th. Frentzen was upholding the Irish team's honour with 6th on the grid. Hill suffered yet another early collision, making contact with Ralf Schumacher at the chicane on lap 4. The German carried on, but Hill was out. Frentzen benefited from Coulthard's gearbox issues on lap 37 and took 5th place. The German passed Rubens Barrichello for 4th on lap 50 but the Brazilian continued to put him under pressure until he had a heavy accident seven laps from the finish. This left Frentzen free to finish in 4th. After that result, he was down to 4th in the Drivers' Championship.

Frentzen and Hill started 8th and 11th in Spain, but both dropped places off the grid, with Ralf Schumacher passing countryman Frentzen and Hill losing out to Pedro Diniz in the Sauber and the Stewart of Johnny Herbert. There was contact between Frentzen and Barrichello, but the German was able to hold onto 9th place. Frentzen ran as high as fifth during the pitstops, and emerged in 8th after Jean Alesi's transmission failure. However, it was not to last and he retired with a differential problem on lap 36. Hill had also gained places, having also benefited from Alesi's retirement and jumped Herbert in the stops. His teammate's problems allowed him to move up to 10th. Retirements on lap 41 of Villeneuve (gearbox) and Diniz (transmission) allowed him to move up to 8th, and he ran as high as 5th before his second stop put him back in 8th. He gained one further place late on, with a pass on Barrichello, but 7th was not enough to score points.

The Jordans started 6th and 14th (Frentzen ahead of Hill) at round 6 in Canada, and the first corner clash between Trulli, Barrichello and Alesi allowed Hill to move up to 12th. The Englishman benefited from Alessandro Zanardi's problems on lap 4 and moved up to 11th. He became the first victim of the now infamous "Wall of Champions", however, and was out on lap 15. Michael Schumacher crashed his Ferrari in the same spot on lap 30, allowing Frentzen to move up to 5th. He climbed to 2nd after the collision between Irvine and Coulthard and a pass on Fisichella's Benetton. However, the Jordan's brakes failed with four laps to go and it was a heavy brush with the barrier which ended the German's promising race. This made the race the first ever to finish under the safety car.

Wet qualifying for the French Grand Prix left a very odd grid, with Barrichello on pole, Frentzen 5th and Hill down in 18th. They each made up a place from the start, with Frentzen passing the slow starting Prost of Olivier Panis and Hill doing the same to Eddie Irvine. Frentzen picked up another place after Coulthard's electrical problems on lap 10, and was in the podium positions. Hill, meanwhile, was having an exciting time, locked in a battle with Irvine, he was up to 15th having gained places after the retirements of Herbert, Diniz and Coulthard. He finally lost out to the Irishman on lap 10 and the Ferrari driver then started his charge up the field. As the skies darkened again, Frentzen was passed by the charging Häkkinen, up from 14th on the grid. Track conditions were becoming treacherous by the time Häkkinen passed Alesi four laps later and all the front runners, led by Barrichello, jumped into the pits for wet tyres. Hill and Alesi both spun off even while the safety car was out. This left Frentzen back in third behind Barrichello and Häkkinen. The Finn spun soon after the restart when trying to pass Barrichello at the hairpin. This put Frentzen into 2nd. He was soon passed by Michael Schumacher, however, and was back to 3rd. After the Ferrari man passed Barrichello for the lead, his gearbox had trouble and he dropped down the field, putting Frentzen in 2nd again. He was soon passed again though by a recovering Häkkinen. However, both the Finn and Barrichello had to pit again and dropped to 2nd and 3rd respectively, leaving Frentzen clear to take his and Jordan's second career victory.

Following this excellent result, the Jordans locked out the third row of the grid in Britain, with Frentzen ahead of Hill. After Michael Schumacher's crash on the first start, they were 4th and 5th. Hill was passed by Michael's brother Ralf on the second start. Frentzen lost out to Ralf Schumacher in the stops, but the wheel problems for Mika Häkkinen meant that after the stops the Jordans were 4th and 5th again. There was a glorious three lap period during the second round of pitstops when the Jordans were running 1st and 2nd, but with normal order resumed they were back to 4th and 5th. Despite Frentzen harrying Schumacher right to the bitter end, this was how they finished.

Frentzen qualified well in Austria, 4th on the grid behind only Häkkinen, Coulthard and Irvine. Hill did less well, he was down in 11th. Coulthard spun his teammate Häkkinen at turn 2, gifting both Jordans a place, but Frentzen lost out to Barrichello and Hill to Fisichella, Trulli and Ricardo Zonta's BAR, leaving them 4th and 13th. A recovering Häkkinen passed Hill on lap 8, but he gained the place back when Ralf Schumacher spun out of the race a lap later. Häkkinen was making a remarkable recovery, and passed Frentzen on lap 34 for 4th. Meanwhile, Hill was gaining places due to a pass on Zonta, the misfortune of Villeneuve (retiring with a transmission failure) and being out of synch with the pitstops. This left him 9th. After things settled down, Hill was up to 10th, thanks to Jean Alesi running out of fuel. He then gained another place when Barrichello's engine blew. This left the Jordans 4th and 9th, and Hill gained another place with three laps to go when Fisichella also suffered an engine failure, but it was too late for the Englishman to add to his measly points tally.

Frentzen was right up at the front in Germany as well, sharing the front row with polesitter Mika Häkkinen. Hill was back in 8th. Both drivers dropped two places on the first lap, Frentzen losing out to Coulthard and Mika Salo, deputising for the injured Michael Schumacher in the Ferrari, and Hill falling prey to Fisichella and Ralf Schumacher. Frentzen was passed by Barrichello going into the stadium section on lap 3, but Hill was gaining a place at the same time due to Fisichella's suspension problems. This left them 5th and 9th. They both gained one further place when Barrichello's Stewart suffered a hydraulic failure three laps later. Coulthard had to pit after damaging his front wing trying to overtake Salo, gifting the Jordans another place. Shortly afterwards, however, Hill suffered a brake failure and was out. Frentzen lost out to Irvine in the pitstops, and was down to 4th. Häkkinen had problems in the pitstops, and dropped back behind Frentzen, but soon passed him again. However, not long after that the McLaren driver had a tyre blow out at a very heavy impact with the barrier. Frentzen was back to 3rd. That was also where he finished, his fourth podium of the season, and it moved him up to 3rd in the drivers' world championship. Meanwhile, teammate Hill was down to 10th.

The Hungaroring was the venue for round 11, the Hungarian Grand Prix. The Jordans once again qualified well, with Frentzen 5th and Hill 6th. Frentzen gained a place on the start, taking advantage of a slow starting David Coulthard. During the stops, Frentzen was jumped by Coulthard, but retained 4th place after Fisichella's engine failure. Hill was pushed back down to 6th as Barrichello jumped ahead of him. This was how they finished, then, with Jordan's first double points since Silverstone. This allowed Hill to move back to 9th in the Drivers' Championship.

Round 12 took the team back to the site of their maiden victory the previous year, Spa-Francorchamps in Belgium. Frentzen was on top form again, qualifying third, and Hill had his best qualifying of the year, he shared the second row with his teammate. Hill had a disastrous start, dropping behind Irvine, Ralf Schumacher and Zanardi, but Frentzen maintained 3rd. Despite Hill harrying Zanardi, the Englishman was unable to find a way past the Williams man on one of his favourite circuits. After the stops, Hill moved up to 5th having jumped both the Williams cars. He dropped behind Ralf Schumacher again in the second pitstops, but was able to secure 6th place and another double points finish for Jordan. Another podium finish for Heinz-Harald Frentzen wasn't enough to prevent him from dropping back to 4th in the world championship, behind race winner David Coulthard.

Frentzen once again qualified on the front row, behind Häkkinen, for the Italian Grand Prix at Monza. Hill was down in 9th, but they both retained their places from the start despite a fast starting Alex Zanardi giving him a run for his money into turn 3. Things remained fairly static until Häkkinen spun out from the lead on lap 30, gifting the lead to Frentzen. Soon after, the pitstops arrived, and Frentzen emerged in the lead, ahead of his closest challengers Salo and Coulthard. Hill was still in 9th, as Villeneuve had jumped him in the stops. Hill was knocked down a further place by an overtake from Alesi with 4 laps to go, but despite pressure right to the end from Ralf Schumacher, Heinz-Harald Frentzen was able to take his and Jordan's second win of the year. This allowed him to move back to 3rd in the championship, but Hill was overtaken by Mika Salo, who had finished third in the race, and dropped to 10th.

The Nürburgring was the venue for round 14, the European Grand Prix. Frentzen did fantastically in qualifying and took pole for the second time in his career, and his first for Jordan. Hill was back in 7th, but failed to make the end of the first lap after being caught up in Pedro Diniz's huge accident along with Alexander Wurz. This brought out the safety car, and gave Frentzen six laps of comfort in the lead, which he had kept despite pressure from Häkkinen at turn one. The rain began to fall on lap 20, but Eddie Jordan did not appear to be unduly worried on the Jordan pit wall. It was looking very good for a second consecutive victory for Frentzen as he emerged from his one and only pitstop still ahead of nearest challenger David Coulthard. It was not to be, however, as ten points went up in smoke along with Frentzen's electrics on lap 33. This race was Jordan's first double retirement of the season, and Damon Hill dropped a further place in the world championship, to 11th as he was overtaken by race winner Johnny Herbert.

Frentzen was still only 12 points off Mika Häkkinen, the championship leader, so going into the penultimate round, the inaugural Malaysian Grand Prix, there was still a theoretical chance of him becoming world champion. Hill out qualified his teammate for a change, he was 9th while Frentzen was an uncharacteristically lowly 14th. Frentzen had a wonderful start, though, and was up to 11th by the end of the first lap. Hill, meanwhile, was in first lap trouble yet again, he spun when he touched Jacques Villeneuve in turn 2, and his race was over. The retirements of Ralf Schumacher (accident) and David Coulthard (fuel pressure) allowed Frentzen to move up to 9th, but it was still looking bad for the championship. The pitstops worked out well for him, though, and he managed to jump Wurz, Villeneuve and Alesi. He came home 6th, to salvage 1 championship point, but his challenge was now over, 19 points behind Eddie Irvine with one race to go.

The season finale was, as always, staged at Suzuka in Japan. This was to be Damon Hill's final race before retirement, and as such he wanted to do well. However, he could only qualify 12th, far bettered by Frentzen, who was 4th. Both drivers dropped two places on the opening lap, with Irvine and Panis passing Frentzen and Hill falling victim to Barrichello and Wurz. Hill gained a place when Trulli retired with an engine failure, but his illustrious career ended in a disappointing fashion when he pulled into the pits complaining of fatigue. Frentzen also gained a place when Trulli's Prost teammate Olivier Panis retired with an electrical failure. The German gained another position when David Coulthard had a dramatic spin in his McLaren and was forced to return to the pits. He was now running fourth, and this was how he finished the season, despite late pressure from year-long rival, Ralf Schumacher. This meant that he ended the year in a fantastic 3rd place, the same as the Jordan team, and Hill was a disappointing 11th.

The car was replaced in 2000 by Gascoyne and Holloway's new brainchild, the EJ10. Hill was replaced by Jarno Trulli, fresh from Prost, but the car was much less successful. It, and its mid-season successor the EJ10B gave the team two podiums, both for Frentzen, but could only manage 6th in the championship.

== Complete Formula One results ==
(key) (results in bold indicate pole position)

Year	Team	Engine	Tyres	Drivers	1	2	3	4	5	6	7	8	9	10	11	12	13	14	15	16	Points	WCC
1999	Jordan	Mugen Honda MF301HD V10	**B**		AUS	BRA	SMR	MON	ESP	CAN	FRA	GBR	AUT	GER	HUN	BEL	ITA	EUR	MAL	JPN	**61**	**3rd**
1999	Jordan	Mugen Honda MF301HD V10	**B**	Damon Hill	Ret	Ret	4	Ret	7	Ret	Ret	5	8	Ret	6	6	10	Ret	Ret	Ret	**61**	**3rd**
1999	Jordan	Mugen Honda MF301HD V10	**B**	Heinz-Harald Frentzen	2	3	Ret	4	Ret	11	1	4	4	3	4	3	1	**Ret**	6	4	**61**	**3rd**
