= Jordan EJ10 =

Formula One racing car

Jordan EJ10 Jordan EJ10B
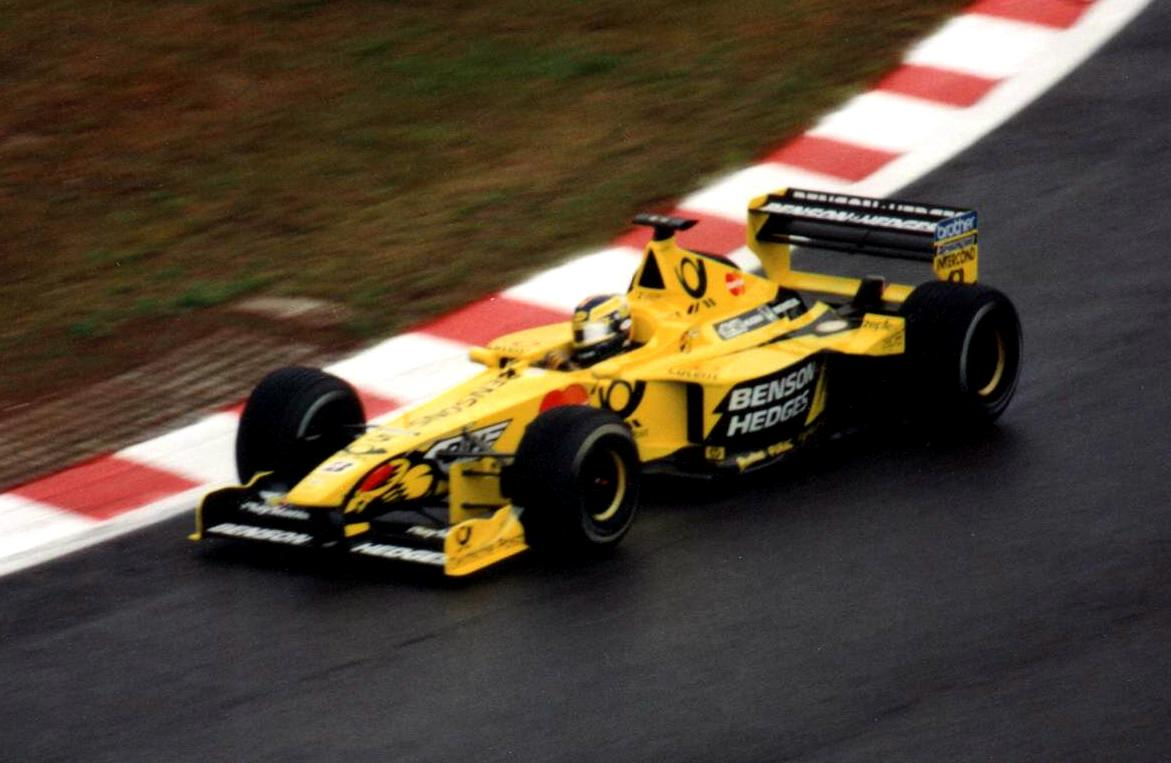
- Heinz-Harald Frentzen driving the EJ10B at the 2000 Belgian Grand Prix
- Category: Formula One
- Constructor: Jordan
- Designers: Mike Gascoyne (Technical Director); Tim Holloway (Engineering Director); Mark Smith (Chief Designer); Bob Bell (Technology Director); John McQuilliam (Head of Composite Design); Ian Hall (Head of Transmission Design); John Iley (Head of Aerodynamics)
- Predecessor: Jordan 199
- Successor: Jordan EJ11

Technical specifications
- Chassis: Moulded carbon fibre composite structure
- Suspension (front): Double wishbones, pushrod operated dampers / torsion bars
- Suspension (rear): Double wishbones, pushrod operated dampers / torsion bars
- Axle track: Front: 1,500 mm (59 in); Rear: 1,410 mm (56 in)
- Wheelbase: 3,050 mm (120 in)
- Engine: Mugen-Honda MF-301HE, 3,000 cc (183.1 cu in), 72° V10, NA, mid-engine, longitudinally-mounted
- Transmission: Jordan 6-speed semi-automatic
- Power: 770 hp (574.2 kW) @ 15,800 rpm
- Fuel: Elf
- Tyres: Bridgestone

Competition history
- Notable entrants: Benson and Hedges Jordan
- Notable drivers: 5. (Germany) Heinz-Harald Frentzen; 6. (Italy) Jarno Trulli
- Debut: 2000 Australian Grand Prix
- Last event: 2000 Malaysian Grand Prix
Races	Wins	Podiums	Poles	F/Laps
17	0	2	0	0

The Jordan EJ10, and an updated version, the EJ10B, was the car with which the Jordan team competed in the 2000 Formula One World Championship. The car was driven by German Heinz-Harald Frentzen, who was in his second season with the team, and Italian Jarno Trulli, who moved from Prost.

The car was designed by Mike Gascoyne, and powered by a Mugen-Honda V10 engine. It was designated the EJ10 to honour team boss Eddie Jordan and the team's tenth season in Formula One, breaking with the previous designation format of '1' followed by the last two digits of the year of competition.

== Overview ==
After their successful 1999 campaign ended in a third-place finish in the constructors' championship, 2000 was seen as a massive disappointment. Although the car showed flashes of promise and usually competed for "best of the rest" honours after the dominant Ferrari and McLaren teams, the car proved disappointingly unreliable, only finishing 15 times out of a possible 34. In the end, the team slipped to sixth overall in the constructors' championship with just 17 points scored. The high points were Heinz-Harald Frentzen's two podiums at Interlagos and Indianapolis, and three front-row starting positions. In addition to the reliability problems of the EJ10, several points were also lost through incidents - including Frentzen crashing out late on from second place at Monte Carlo, and both cars being eliminated in a six-car pile-up on the opening lap at Monza.

During the course of the season, the team announced a works Honda engine deal for 2001, putting it in direct competition with BAR. The car's designer, Mike Gascoyne, was also placed on gardening leave during the season after he expressed a desire to join Benetton the following year.

Starting with the race weekend in Germany, a further developed car designated EJ10B was used for the remainder of the season. The new cars were originally scheduled to debut at the Austrian Grand Prix; however, their use was postponed.

== Sponsorship and livery ==
For the third and final year, Jordan once again included a hornet on their EJ-10. Jordan used Benson & Hedges logos, except at the British, French and United States Grands Prix, when it was replaced with "Buzzin' Hornets".

In November 2000 Eddie Jordan launched their own energy drink EJ-10, which was already in use by the team members during the season.

== Complete Formula One results ==
(key) (results in bold indicate pole position)

Year	Team	Chassis	Engine	Drivers	1	2	3	4	5	6	7	8	9	10	11	12	13	14	15	16	17	Points	WCC
2000	Benson and Hedges Jordan	EJ10	Mugen Honda MF301HE V10		AUS	BRA	SMR	GBR	ESP	EUR	MON	CAN	FRA	AUT	GER	HUN	BEL	ITA	USA	JPN	MAL	17	6th
2000	Benson and Hedges Jordan	EJ10	Mugen Honda MF301HE V10	(Germany) Heinz-Harald Frentzen	Ret	3	Ret	17	6	Ret	10	Ret	7	Ret								17	6th
2000	Benson and Hedges Jordan	EJ10	Mugen Honda MF301HE V10	(Italy) Jarno Trulli	Ret	4	15	6	12	Ret	Ret	6	6	Ret								17	6th
2000	Benson and Hedges Jordan	EJ10B	Mugen Honda MF301HE V10	(Germany) Heinz-Harald Frentzen											Ret	6	6	Ret	3	Ret	Ret	17	6th
2000	Benson and Hedges Jordan	EJ10B	Mugen Honda MF301HE V10	(Italy) Jarno Trulli											9	7	Ret	Ret	Ret	13	12	17	6th
