= Jordan Grand Prix =

Irish auto racing team (1991–2005)

Jordan
- Full name: Jordan Grand Prix
- Base: Silverstone, Northamptonshire, England
- Founder(s): Eddie Jordan
- Noted staff: Gary Anderson; Adrian Burgess; Mike Gascoyne; John Iley; Sam Michael; Rob Smedley; Mark Gallagher
- Noted drivers: (Brazil) Rubens Barrichello (Italy) Giancarlo Fisichella (France) Jean Alesi (Germany) Michael Schumacher (Germany) Heinz-Harald Frentzen (Italy) Jarno Trulli (Germany) Ralf Schumacher (United Kingdom) Damon Hill (United Kingdom) Eddie Irvine (Portugal) Tiago Monteiro (Germany) Nick Heidfeld (Japan) Takuma Sato (United Kingdom) Martin Brundle (Belgium) Bertrand Gachot (Germany) Timo Glock (India) Narain Karthikeyan
- Next name: Midland F1 Racing

Formula One World Championship career
- First entry: 1991 United States Grand Prix
- Races entered: 250
- Engines: Ford, Yamaha, Hart, Peugeot, Mugen-Honda, Honda, Toyota
- Constructors' Championships: 0 (best finish: 3rd, 1999)
- Drivers' Championships: 0 (best finish: 3rd, 1999, Frentzen)
- Race victories: 4
- Podiums: 19
- Pole positions: 2
- Fastest laps: 2
- Final entry: 2005 Chinese Grand Prix

Jordan Grand Prix was a Formula One constructor that competed from 1991 to 2005. The team was named after Irish businessman and founder Eddie Jordan (1948–2025) and was based at Silverstone, England, but raced with an Irish licence.

In early 2005, the team was sold to Midland Group, who competed for one final season as Jordan, before renaming the team as Midland F1 Racing for the 2006 season. Later that same year, it was sold to Dutch car manufacturer, Spyker, to become Spyker F1 for the 2007 season, and then sold again to become Force India in 2008. In 2018, as a result of the financial collapse of the Force India team, and its subsequent buyout by a consortium led by Lawrence Stroll, the team's FIA entry was not transferred, and the Jordan Grand Prix's original entry came to an end. As of 2026, the de facto team lineage competes as the Aston Martin Aramco F1 Team.

== History ==
=== Early history ===
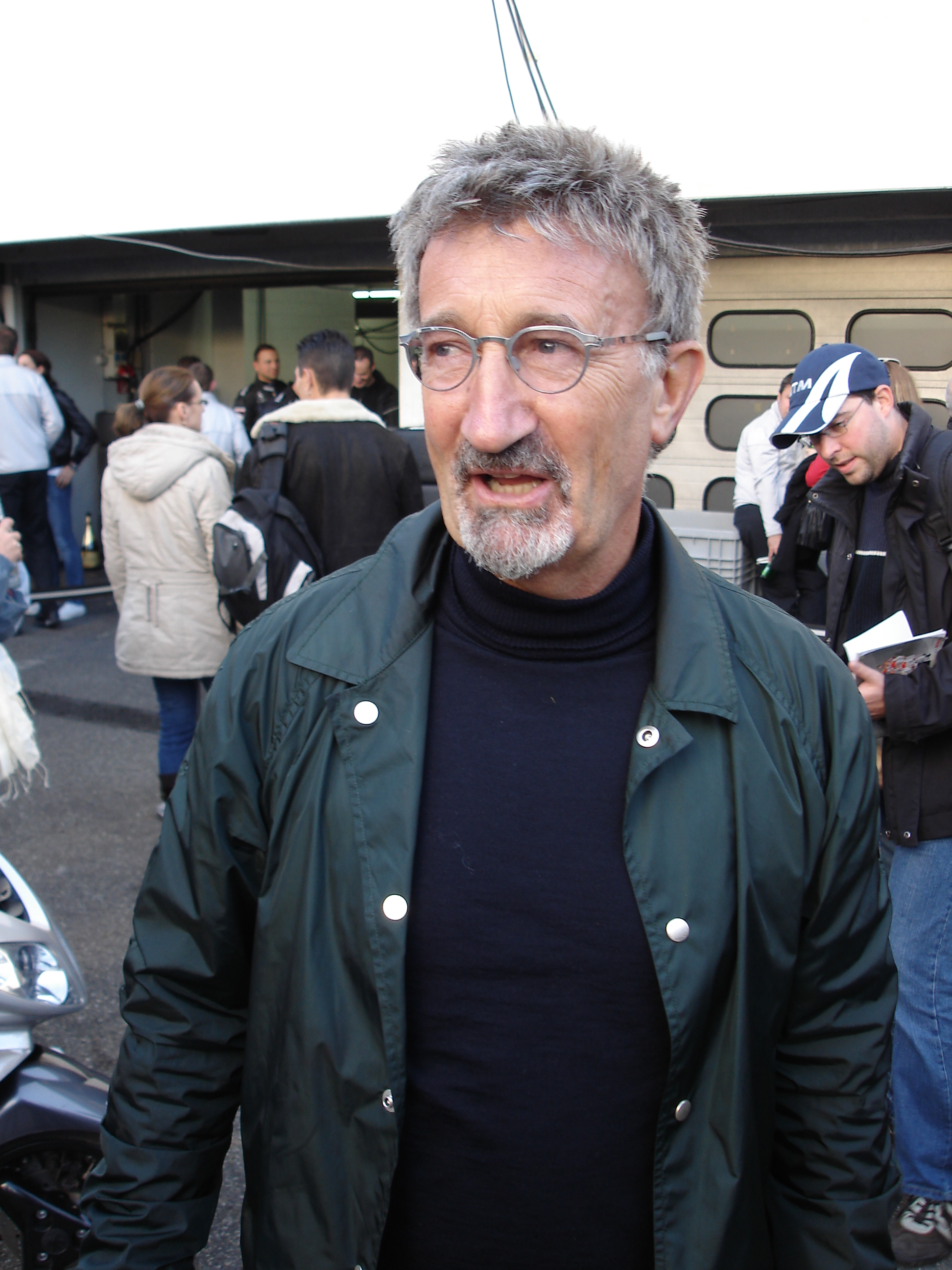
Eddie Jordan, founder of Jordan Grand Prix, during 2009's second DTM race weekend at Hockenheim.

Eddie Jordan had a brief stint as a race driver in the late 1970s before founding Eddie Jordan Racing in the early 1980s. The team first came to prominence in the 1983 British Formula Three championship with a duel between one-time Jordan test driver Ayrton Senna and Jordan-Ralt driver Martin Brundle. Brundle was edged out by the Brazilian at the last round of the championship. The team graduated to International Formula 3000 for 1988, winning its first race in the category with Johnny Herbert behind the wheel. In 1989, Jordan won the F3000 drivers' championship with future Formula One star Jean Alesi. The team also ran future F1 drivers such as Martin Donnelly and Eddie Irvine in F3000.

=== Formula One ===
==== Beginnings in F1 and becoming established midfield team (1991–1996) ====
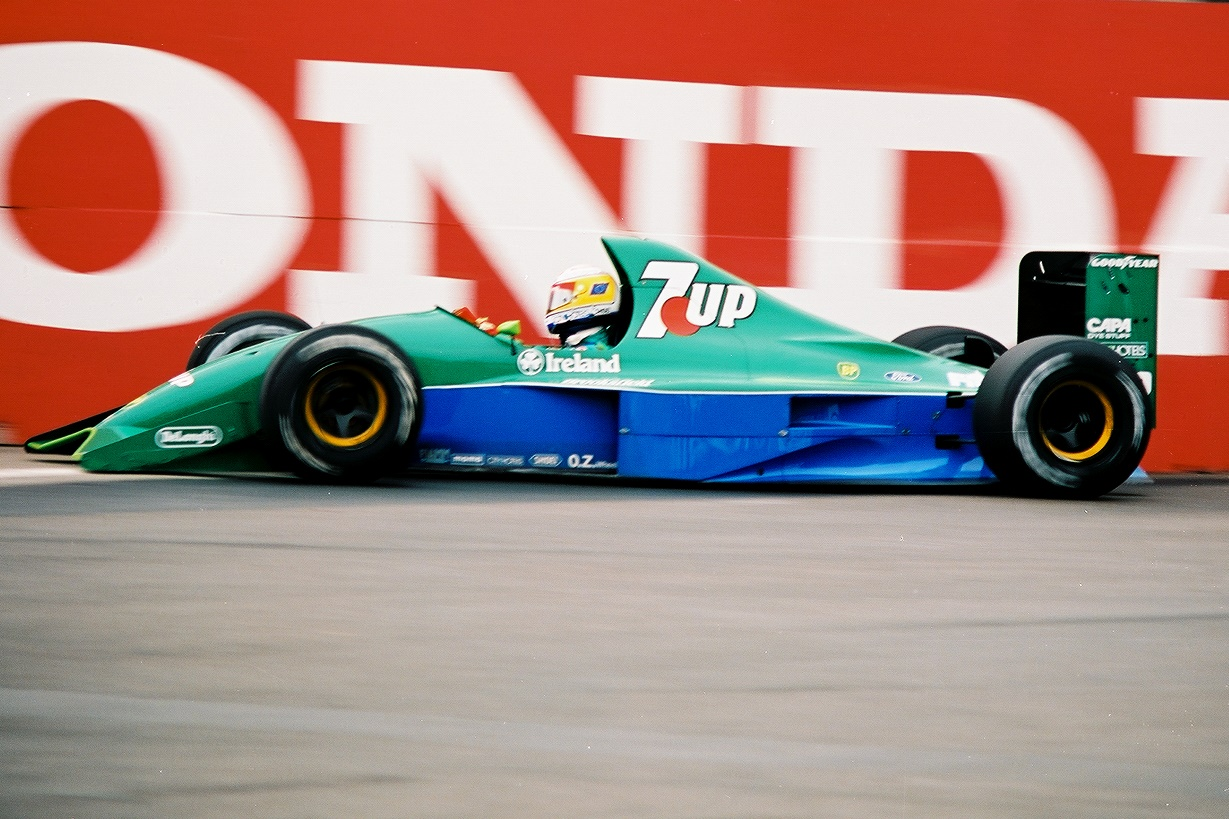
Bertrand Gachot giving Jordan their F1 début at the 1991 United States Grand Prix.

Jordan's success in lower formulae inspired the creation of a Formula One programme for the 1991 season and a change of name to Jordan Grand Prix. The first driver to test a Jordan F1 car was John Watson. Jordan hired Italian veteran Andrea de Cesaris and Belgian Bertrand Gachot to race his first cars, which were powered by Ford. The team had a very solid debut finishing 5th in the Constructors' Championship, with de Cesaris finishing 9th in the Drivers' Championship. De Cesaris ran second for much of the Belgian Grand Prix, and was actually gaining on leader Ayrton Senna until the car failed in the closing laps. Gachot was sent to prison mid-season for attacking a taxi driver, and was replaced for the Belgian Grand Prix by Michael Schumacher. On his debut at Spa-Francorchamps, Schumacher qualified seventh, but his clutch failed as he pulled away from the grid and he retired on the first lap. In the same race de Cesaris was closing on the leader, Ayrton Senna, until his engine failed.The team received $150,000 from Mercedes-Benz in return for giving their young German sportscar star experience of Grand Prix racing. Despite Jordan's agreement in principle with Mercedes to retain Schumacher for the remainder of the season, the German driver signed to Benetton-Ford for the following race. Jordan applied for an injunction in the UK courts to prevent Schumacher driving for Benetton, but lost the case as they had not yet signed a contract. Ousted Benetton driver Roberto Moreno and future Champ Car title winner Alessandro Zanardi filled the second car afterwards. Success for Jordan literally came at a high price. The team was forced to switch to cheaper Yamaha engines for the 1992 season. With Maurício Gugelmin and Stefano Modena driving, the team struggled badly and failed to score a point until the final race of the season. The team's first car, the Jordan 191, was designed by Gary Anderson and powered by a Cosworth-built Ford HB V8. Its best results were fourth places at the Canadian and Mexican Grands Prix, and it set the fastest lap at the Hungarian Grand Prix. Seven chassis were built. In September 2026 chassis 191/3, which de Cesaris raced in 1991, was offered at the Bonhams Goodwood Revival sale. It was still in its original 7 Up and Fuji Film livery and had been with one owner since it was bought from Eddie Jordan in 1992.

1993 saw further changes, with the team switching engine suppliers, this time to Hart. Again, the season started with two new drivers, Ivan Capelli and Brazilian rookie Rubens Barrichello. Capelli left after two races and five other drivers teamed with Barrichello during the 1993 campaign. Jordan only had moderate improvement, scoring three points. Signs of stability were beginning to show near the end of the season when Barrichello was joined by Eddie Irvine, a former Jordan driver in F3000. Irvine finished sixth and secured a point on his debut Formula One race at Suzuka, memorably unlapping himself against McLaren's Ayrton Senna, in order to overtake Damon Hill. After the race finished, an incensed Senna, infuriated by what he deemed as unsafe racing by Irvine in poor weather conditions, stormed into the Jordan garage and punched Irvine in the face after Irvine pushed him in a heated discussion.

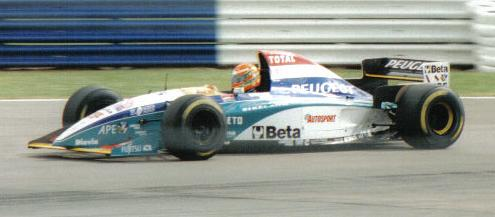
Eddie Irvine driving for Jordan at the 1995 British Grand Prix.

Barrichello and Irvine returned for the 1994 season, as did the Hart engines, but Irvine had a bad start to the season, earning a three-race ban for reckless driving. Barrichello earned the team their first top three finish in Japan at the Pacific Grand Prix, but was nearly killed during the following race in San Marino in a frightening qualifying crash. The team overcame these difficulties and returned to their initial form, repeating its fifth place finish in the Constructors' Championship with 28 points, a notable achievement from a low budget team with an engine designed and built by Darrell O'Brien/Hart Engineering. Barrichello earned Jordan's first pole position after a gamble during a wet qualifying session in Belgium, and finished 6th in the Drivers' Championship with 19 points.

Jordan switched to full-works Peugeot power in 1995 after one season with McLaren team who switched to works Mercedes-Benz engines. During the Canadian Grand Prix that year, both Barrichello and Irvine finished on the podium, finishing second and third respectively. It was the highlight to an unspectacular but relatively solid year for Jordan, as they hung around mid-pack to finish 6th in the Championship.

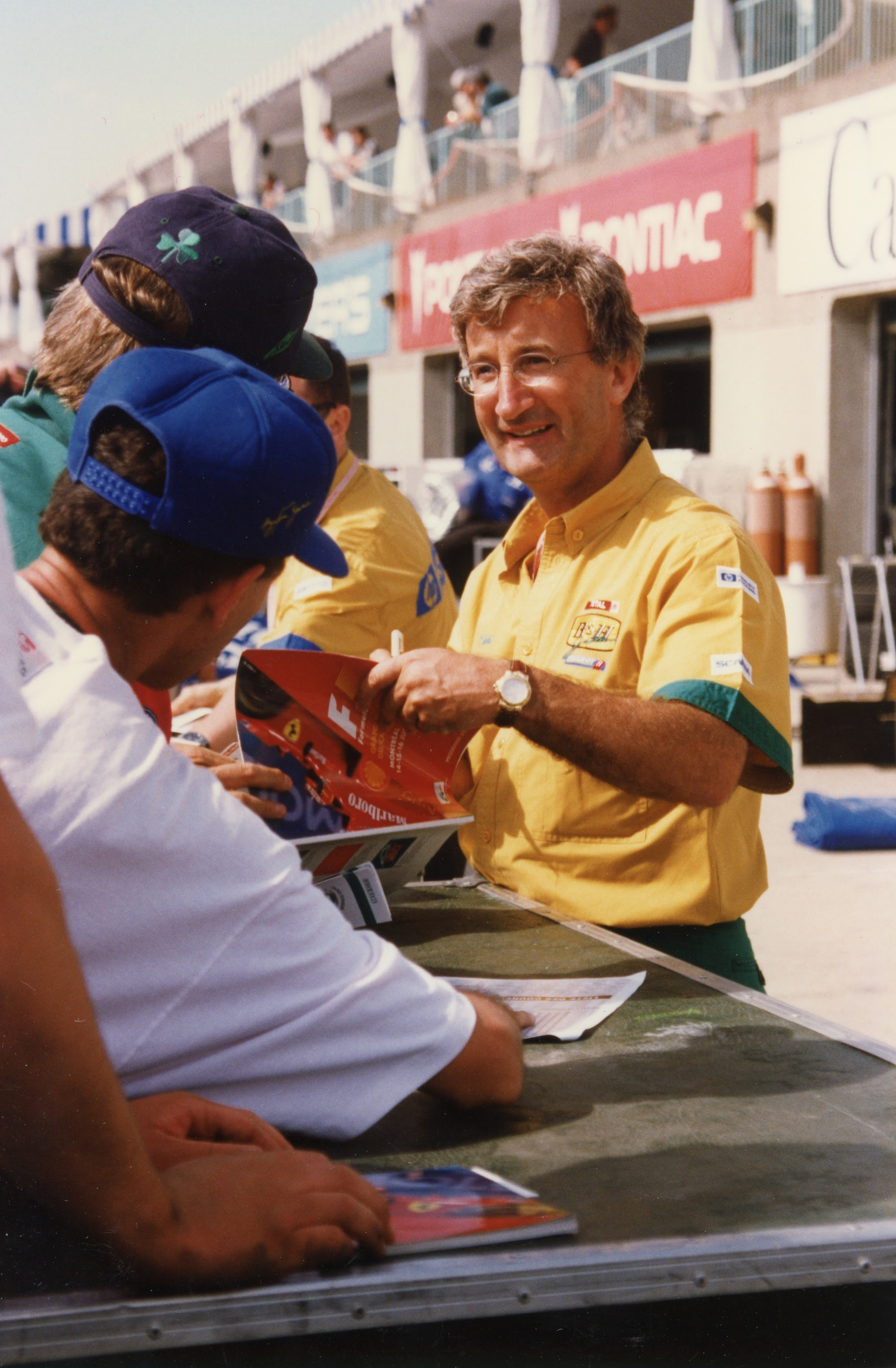
Eddie Jordan greets fans in Montreal in 1996.

When Irvine left in 1996 to become Michael Schumacher's teammate at Ferrari, Jordan replaced him with veteran Martin Brundle, the ex-Le Mans winner and World Sportscar Champion. The team failed to make the podium, but both drivers managed to score a string of fourth-place finishes as the team scored yet another 5th among the constructors. 1996 also saw the team adopt their bright-yellow colour scheme which would become their trademark.

==== Ascent in form (1997–1999) ====
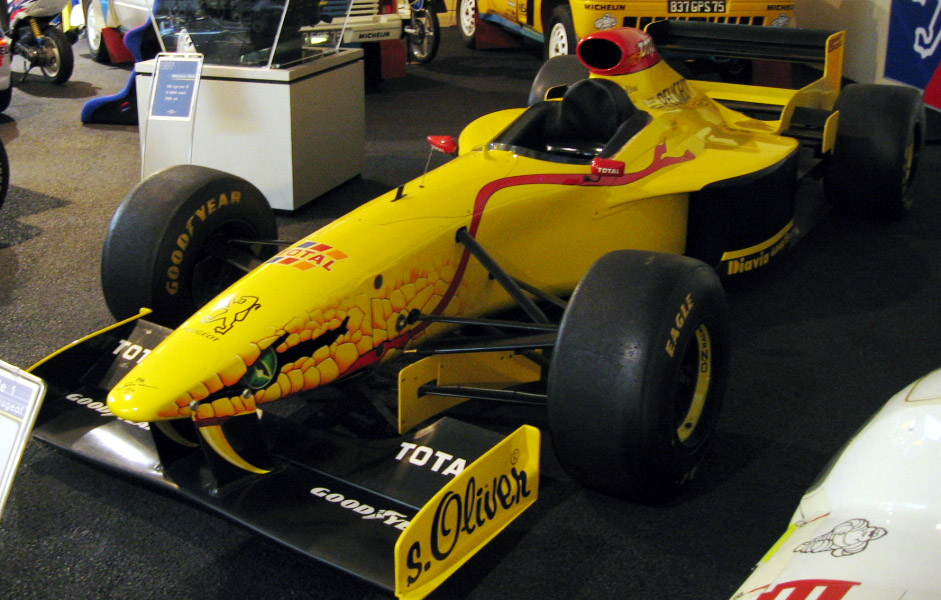
Jordan introduced nose arts from 1997 to 2001, their snake mascot Hissing Sid in the first year.

1997 saw the departure of both drivers from the previous year. Barrichello left for the newly formed Stewart Grand Prix, whilst Brundle became a Formula One commentator for ITV. Jordan replaced them with Italian Giancarlo Fisichella, who had raced for Minardi the previous year, and young Ralf Schumacher, Michael's brother. Again, the team finished 5th in the Championship, with Fisichella achieving two podium finishes. At Hockenheim, Fisichella had led the race, but lost out to Gerhard Berger before retiring when a puncture holed his car's radiator. The Italian's other highlight was scoring the fastest race lap at the Spanish Grand Prix. A lowlight of the season came in Argentina when Ralf Schumacher took out his Italian teammate during the race, which was tempered by Ralf's first podium.

In 1998, the team made its biggest signing as former World Champion Damon Hill, a graduate of Jordan's F3000 programme, replaced Fisichella. The team also replaced its Peugeots, which went to Prost, with Mugen Honda motors. Up to the halfway point of the season, Jordan had failed to score a single point due to reliability problems. At that point, they signed Mike Gascoyne from Tyrrell to bolster the technical team and long-standing technical director Gary Anderson resigned a few months after. Things improved greatly towards the end of the season and at that year's rain-soaked Belgian Grand Prix in which only six cars finished, Hill earned Jordan their first ever Formula One win, which was also Hill's 22nd career Grand Prix victory. Ralf Schumacher sweetened the victory by finishing second. However, it was later revealed to be team orders – Schumacher had been ordered not to pass Hill. Angered by this, his brother Michael told Jordan that Ralf would never race for the team again and subsequently bought out his brother's contract for two million pounds, this satisfied Jordan due to the scandal and manner of Michael's own switch from Jordan to Benetton back in 1991. Hill finished 6th in the drivers' standings with Ralf 10th. Hill's last lap, last-corner move on Heinz-Harald Frentzen at Suzuka enabled him to finish the race in fourth and also earned Jordan fourth in the Constructors' Championship for 1998 (this was tempered by speculation that Frentzen had "gifted" the place to Hill, the German having confirmed a move to Jordan for 1999, after a tumultuous career with Williams).

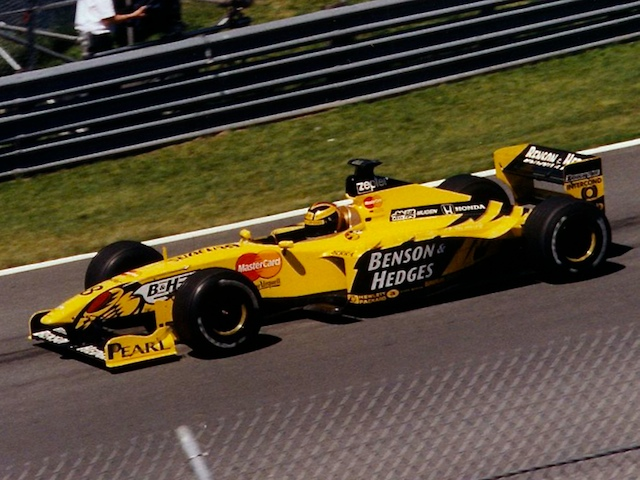
The 1999 season was Jordan's most successful in F1, with Heinz-Harald Frentzen winning two races. The team finished third in the Constructors' Championship.

With Frentzen and Ralf Schumacher swapping teams for 1999 (Frentzen at Jordan and Ralf at Williams), the season would turn out to be a nightmare for Hill, who was to retire at the end of the season. However, Frentzen's season was immensely successful, with the German earning two victories and a pole position. For a short while Frentzen had entertained thoughts of a world title, but poor luck and greater speed from McLaren and Ferrari ended his hopes. Frentzen finished third in the Drivers' Championship and the team also finished third amongst the Constructors'. 1999 was to be the team's finest season.

==== Decline in form (2000–2002) ====
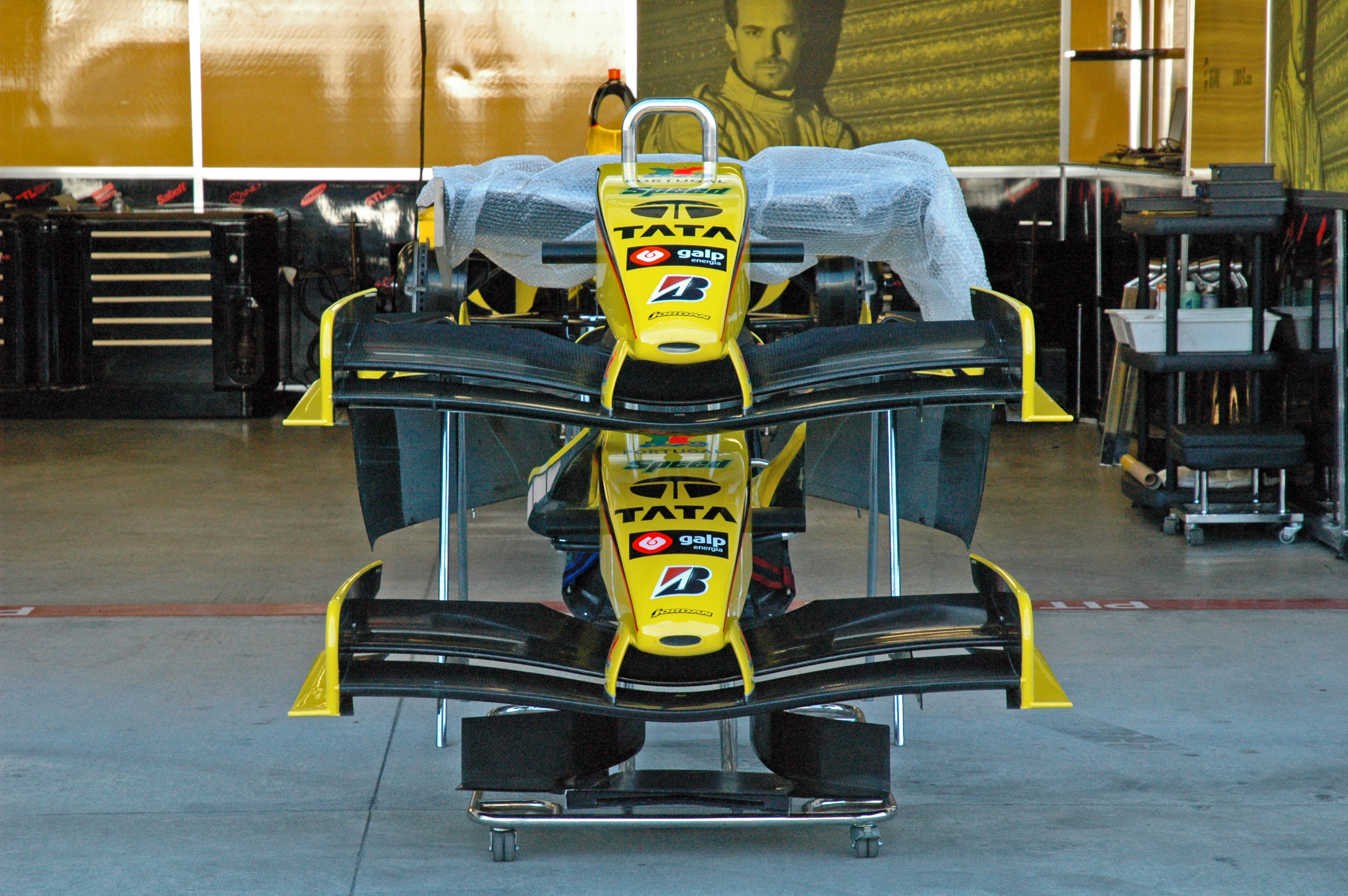
Noses and front wings in the Jordan garages at the 2005 United States Grand Prix.

For 2000 Hill was replaced by Jarno Trulli, fresh from a couple of years at Prost and Minardi. His qualifying speed in particular impressed, but he was unable to score a podium. Frentzen was unable to replicate the success of 1999 and the team slipped back to 6th in the Constructors' Championship. They could have easily finished higher had it not been for a combination of poor reliability and unfortunate incidents. The team had been on course for major points at Monaco, but poor luck intervened: Trulli was ahead of eventual winner David Coulthard until his gearbox failed, while Frentzen running in second place hit the wall at Sainte Devote with only eight laps to go. The 2000 season saw the team achieve just two podiums all season, two third places courtesy of Frentzen in Brazil and the United States.

Both drivers returned to start 2001 and Jordan switched to works Honda engines which were already being supplied to rival team BAR after Mugen left the sport at the end of 2000. This led to a battle for the right to use the Honda engines in the long term. Frentzen was released from the team in mid-season, a series of disagreements with team boss Eddie Jordan a possible explanation. Jordan himself has said that he dropped Frentzen to bring in Takuma Sato for 2002, an attempt to satisfy Honda. Frentzen was replaced by test driver Ricardo Zonta at the German Grand Prix, but from thereafter Jean Alesi, in the final stages of his Formula One career, took the seat. Amidst all the turmoil, Trulli finished in the points four times, and the team finished 5th in the Constructors' Championship for the fifth time, ahead of rivals BAR but failed to score a single podium during a Grand Prix season for the first time since 1993.

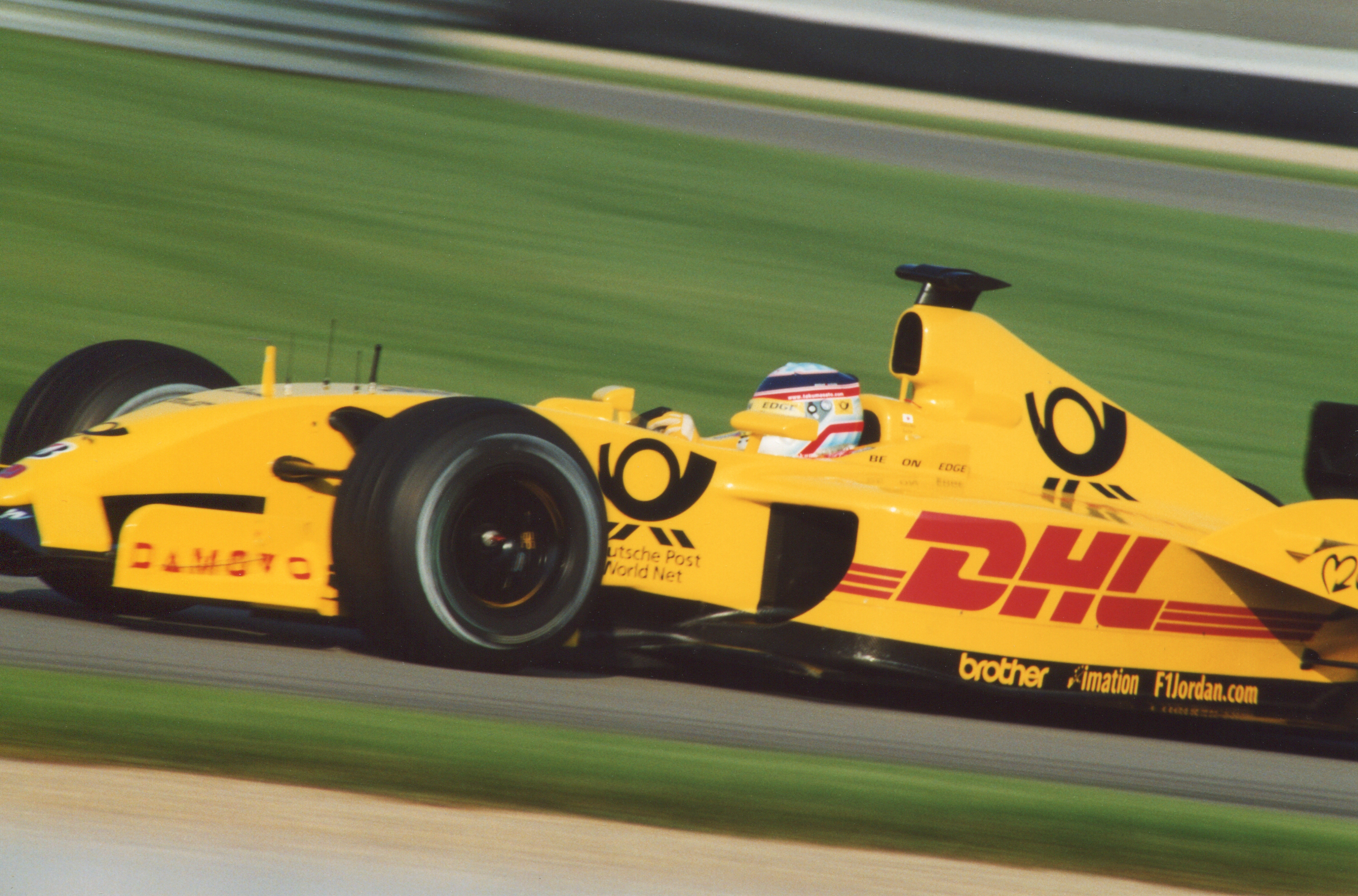
Takuma Sato driving for the Jordan Grand Prix team at Indianapolis in 2002.

Jordan re-organised in 2002, with Fisichella returning and Takuma Sato joining the team, thanks in no small part to Honda's influence. Due to a drop in sponsorship money (despite DHL joining the team as a title sponsor in addition to Benson & Hedges) the team slipped down the pecking order on the grid. Fisichella often exceeded the car's expectations in qualifying, a sixth place on the grid in Montreal and a fifth place on the grid in Budapest. Yet results-wise, the Italian had to make do with a trio of fifth places and a sixth place from Hungary. Sato showed flashes of promise, but managed just two points at his home race. Despite the drop in form, Jordan still managed sixth in the championship, two places ahead of main rivals BAR.

==== Return to Ford, final race victory and fall to backmarker status (2003–2004) ====
For 2003, Honda left Jordan to concentrate on their partnership with BAR. Jordan had to make do with Ford Cosworth engines, and the season was not regarded as a success. Despite beating only Minardi to score 9th in the standings, Jordan won in 2003. This came under bizarre circumstances in the Brazilian Grand Prix which was affected by rain. Following a massive accident on the start/finish straight, the race was red flagged and stopped. After some initial confusion, Giancarlo Fisichella was initially ruled to have finished second behind Kimi Räikkönen who took the top step on the podium. However, an FIA inquiry several days later led to Fisichella being officially declared the winner of his first F1 race. Fisichella was therefore unable to celebrate his first career victory on the top step of the podium, although he and Räikkönen swapped their drivers' trophies in an impromptu ceremony at the following race in San Marino, while McLaren's Ron Dennis handed over the constructors' trophy to Eddie Jordan. Aside from the opportunistic win, neither Fisichella nor rookie teammate Ralph Firman were able to achieve any sort of success in their EJ13s. After Firman was injured in practice for the Hungarian Grand Prix Jordan fielded the first ever Hungarian Formula One driver, Zsolt Baumgartner. Firman returned for the final two events, but was unable to add to the point he won in Spain. Fisichella only managed two points on top of his victory and unhappy at the team's form he departed for Sauber.

In June 2003 Jordan sued mobile phone company Vodafone for £150 million, claiming that the company had made a verbal contract for a three-year sponsorship, then given it to Ferrari instead. Jordan withdrew the action two months later, agreeing to pay Vodafone's costs. This was a double financial blow from which the team never recovered. The judge was highly critical of Eddie Jordan, branding the allegations against Vodafone "without foundation and false".

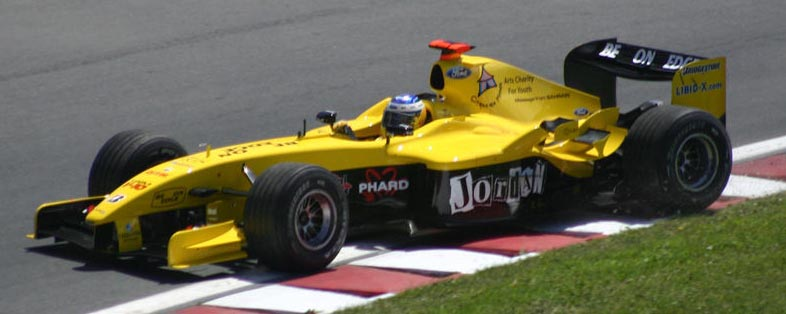
Nick Heidfeld driving for Jordan at the 2004 Canadian Grand Prix.

In 2004, Jordan struggled financially, and their status for the future was questionable. The team fielded German Nick Heidfeld, formerly of Sauber and Prost, and Italian rookie Giorgio Pantano. Ex-F3000 champion Heidfeld showed promise, but could not achieve many good results due to the car's initial pace being poor. Pantano's season was dogged by sponsorship problems. He missed Canada due to a lack of funding, with Timo Glock stepping in to replace him. Glock managed to score two points on his debut, finishing just ahead of Heidfeld, although these had been earned after the two Toyota and Williams cars had been disqualified for brake duct irregularities. Later in the season, Glock replaced Pantano permanently. As in the previous season, the team finished ahead of only Minardi at the bottom of the constructors standings.

==== Sale to Midland Group and Toyota customer engines (2005) ====
After Ford's decision to put Cosworth up for sale, Jordan had been left without an engine deal for 2005. However, at short notice, Toyota agreed to supply Jordan with customer RVX-05 engines identical to those in the works Toyota cars as a paid lease agreement instead of free of charge. In 2005 after a constructors' meeting at Heathrow, Bernie Ecclestone introduced Alex Schnaider to Eddie Jordan. Six weeks later, Eddie Jordan had sold the team to the Midland Group for $60 million. The day the deal was signed, Eddie sat in Ian Phillips' office and was in tears.

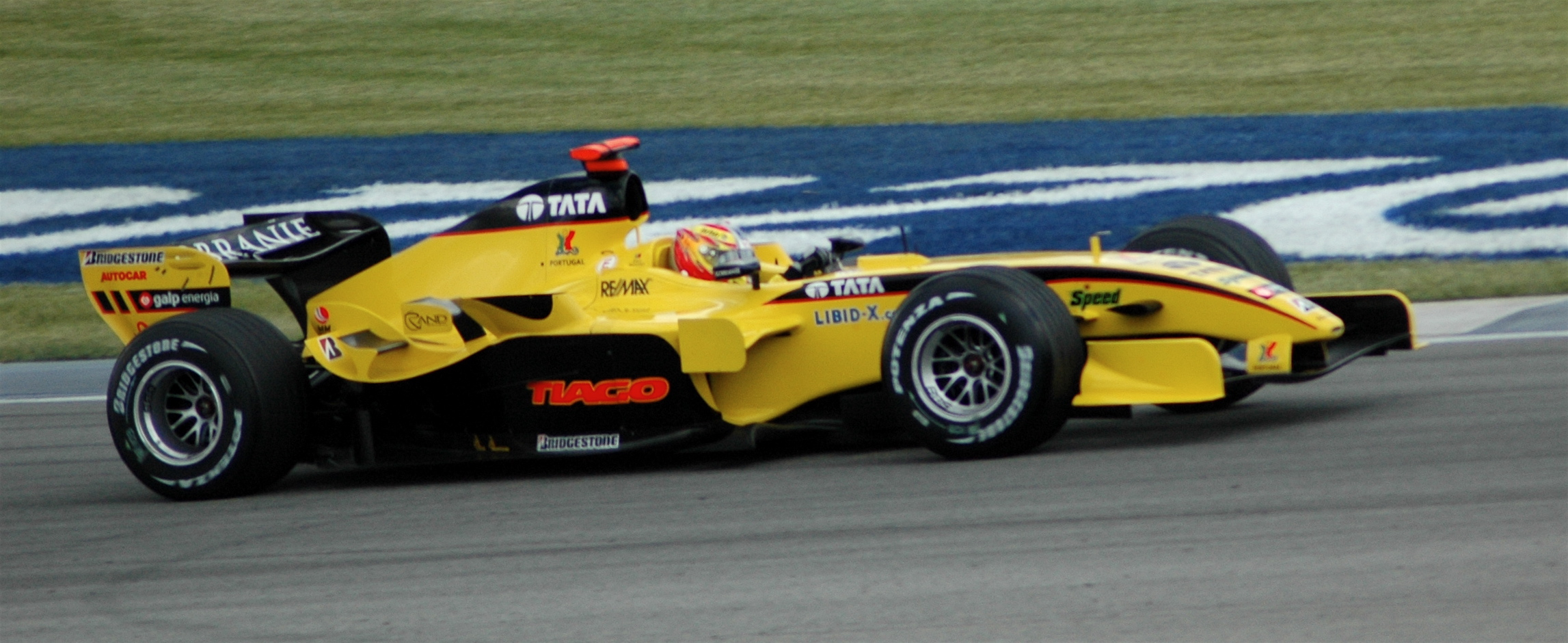
Tiago Monteiro at the 2005 United States Grand Prix.

The Jordan name was retained for the 2005 season, before being changed to Midland MF1 Racing for the 2006 season. Throughout 2005, journalists questioned whether Midland were in Formula One for the long haul. Rumours circulated throughout the season that the team was for sale, and that former driver Eddie Irvine was interested in buying them. The year also saw the debut of two new rookie drivers, Narain Karthikeyan and Tiago Monteiro. 2005 merely confirmed Jordan's status at the back of the grid. A final podium came in the highly controversial race at Indianapolis, with Monteiro leading home a Jordan 3–4 after most rivals did not start. Monteiro managed an excellent eighth place at Spa in wet conditions to give the team its last point. The final race for the team saw a low-key exit, with Monteiro finishing 11th and Karthikeyan crashing out spectacularly.

== Role in developing driver talent ==
Jordan Grand Prix was notable for providing the debut to a number of drivers who subsequently enjoyed considerable F1 and wider motor-racing careers. This was due to both Eddie Jordan's experience managing the careers of drivers (most notably Jean Alesi) before entering his own team to F1, and the team's ongoing need for funding which new drivers frequently brought via personal sponsorship. Notably successful drivers who began their F1 careers with Jordan include multiple World Champion Michael Schumacher (1991), Championship Auto Racing Teams (CART) Champion Alex Zanardi (1991), F1 race winners Rubens Barrichello (1993), Eddie Irvine (1993), and Ralf Schumacher (1997), and Indy 500 winner Takuma Sato (2002). The close-knit and relaxed atmosphere of the team also allowed drivers who had failed to achieve expectations with other teams to perform at their best. Most notably, Heinz-Harald Frentzen won two races to challenge for the 1999 World Championship, something he had failed to do for the much more competitive Williams team in 1997. Andrea de Cesaris rehabilitated his reputation from that of a 'crasher' to become a dependable driver during his season with the team in 1991, and Jarno Trulli, Giancarlo Fisichella and Nick Heidfeld each used their time at Jordan Grand Prix to show potential and be recruited by larger teams.

As well as giving both Michael and Ralf Schumacher their F1 debuts, Jordan benefited from Germany's growing interest in Formula One during the 1990s and early 2000s, with the other notable German drivers of the era (Frentzen, Heidfeld, and Timo Glock) all driving for the team and Deutsche Post World Net being a major sponsor of the team from 2000 to 2003.

== Sponsorship ==
In 1991, the team was sponsored by soft drink brand 7 Up, but despite the team's moderately successful first season and Eddie Jordan saying the team had "more than fulfilled our part of the bargain", the sponsorship was replaced by South African energy company Sasol until 1994, with Barclay supplementing until 1993. In the team's first year with Peugeot engines, fuel supplier Total was the title sponsor in 1995.

From 1996 to 2005, Benson & Hedges was the primary sponsor of Jordan. At races where the ban on cigarette advertising was in force, the name was replaced by "Bitten & Hisses" (in 1997 when Jordan's mascot was the snake Hissing Sid) or the names of the team's drivers, Giancarlo Fisichella and Ralf Schumacher, with additional 'S's, "Buzzin Hornets" (while the mascot was an unnamed hornet from 1998 to 2000), "Bitten Heroes" (during 2001, when the team's mascot was a shark), and from 2002 to 2005 'Be On Edge' (BENSON & HEDGES). It was in the sponsor's first year that the team coloured their cars in the gold of their cigarette packet and then switched to yellow after that.

For 2002, title sponsorship went to delivery company DHL, before reverting to Benson & Hedges (which remained a major sponsor in 2002). At the 2004 and 2005 United States Grands Prix, Sobranie was advertised instead; the team (along with Scuderia Ferrari) had previously run non-tobacco liveries on previous United States Grands Prix due to U.S. Tobacco Master Settlement Agreement requirements, as a clause in the settlement restricted Philip Morris USA (who holds the Benson & Hedges trademark in the United States) to one sponsorship, that of Team Penske in American open-wheel racing.

=== EJ-10 ===
EJ-10 was an energy drink marketed by the Jordan Formula One team. The energy drink was heavily advertised as free of caffeine and taurine to avoid a sugar crash, and as having a fruity flavour and providing energy for up to 90 minutes. It was sold in bright yellow 250 mL and 380 mL bottles, decorated to evoke the image of Jordan's Formula One cars. Jordan Grand Prix used the Sutherland Hawes design agency to create and market the energy drink. At the height of its popularity EJ-10 was available around the world, including Ireland, Germany, Colombia, Ecuador, Saudi Arabia, and Mexico.

In 2002, the 380 ml bottles of EJ-10 were recalled in Ireland after it was discovered it contained unacceptable levels of benzene.

V-10 is a spinoff of EJ-10; it retains the basic formula but adds vodka.

=== Honda Civic Jordan ===
To commemorate the team's successful 1999 campaign powered by Mugen-Honda engines, Honda sold 500 limited edition Honda Civic models called Civic Jordan in the United Kingdom. Based on the EK4 VTi-S hatchback model, the cars were painted Sunlight Yellow and featured yellow-and-black leather interior, Jordan decals on the sides and rear of the car as well as stitched into the seats and floor carpets, and body kit partially based on the Japanese Type-R model. Apart from a signed Eddie Jordan plaque on the cars' centre console, the team had no involvement on the development on the car, which performed otherwise similar to a standard VTi model.

== Factory and legacy ==
Eddie Jordan built the team's factory in 1990, on a road opposite the Silverstone Circuit, when he decided to move his junior single-seater team into Formula One. Jordan used the building from its debut in 1991 until the end of 2005. The site was then used by its successors Midland, Spyker, Force India, Racing Point and Aston Martin. Cars designed and built there won five Grands Prix: four for Jordan and the 2020 Sakhir Grand Prix for Racing Point.

After Aston Martin moved into a new factory on the same site, the original Jordan building was demolished in the summer of 2023 to make way for the team's new technical campus. In 2026, Aston Martin's technical chief Adrian Newey said that working methods carried over from the Jordan era had contributed to the team's poor start to the 2026 season.

Eddie Jordan died on 20 March 2025. At the 2025 Chinese Grand Prix that weekend. Team principal Andy Cowell said that Jordan had "founded this team and took it to F1 in 1991".

== Books ==
Several books have been published that provided a comprehensive understanding of Jordan Grand Prix. The most comprehensive was the 1994 book Race Without End. Authored by Maurice Hamilton, a seasoned Formula 1 professional, the book chronicles the events and experiences of Jordan Grand Prix during the 1993 season.

== Racing record ==
Year	Name	Car	Engine	Tyres	No.	Drivers	Points	WCC
1991	(Republic of Ireland) Team 7Up Jordan	191	Ford HB4 3.5 V8	G	32. 32. 32. 32. 33.	(Belgium) Bertrand Gachot (Germany) Michael Schumacher (Brazil) Roberto Moreno (Italy) Alessandro Zanardi (Italy) Andrea de Cesaris	13	5th
1992	(Republic of Ireland) Sasol Jordan Yamaha	192	Yamaha OX99 3.5 V12	G	32. 33.	(Italy) Stefano Modena (Brazil) Maurício Gugelmin	1	11th
1993	(Republic of Ireland) Sasol Jordan	193	Hart 1035 3.5 V10	G	14. 15. 15. 15. 15. 15.	(Brazil) Rubens Barrichello (Italy) Ivan Capelli (Belgium) Thierry Boutsen (Italy) Marco Apicella (Italy) Emanuele Naspetti (United Kingdom) Eddie Irvine	3	11th
1994	(Republic of Ireland) Sasol Jordan	194	Hart 1035 3.5 V10	G	14. 15. 15. 15.	(Brazil) Rubens Barrichello (United Kingdom) Eddie Irvine (Japan) Aguri Suzuki (Italy) Andrea de Cesaris	28	5th
1995	(Republic of Ireland) Total Jordan Peugeot	195	Peugeot A10 3.0 V10	G	14. 15.	(Brazil) Rubens Barrichello (United Kingdom) Eddie Irvine	21	6th
1996	(Republic of Ireland) Benson & Hedges Total Jordan Peugeot	196	Peugeot A12 EV5 3.0 V10	G	11. 12.	(Brazil) Rubens Barrichello (United Kingdom) Martin Brundle	22	5th
1997	(Republic of Ireland) Benson & Hedges Total Jordan Peugeot	197	Peugeot A14 3.0 V10	G	11. 12.	(Germany) Ralf Schumacher (Italy) Giancarlo Fisichella	33	5th
1998	(Republic of Ireland) Benson & Hedges Jordan	198	Mugen-Honda MF-301 HC 3.0 V10	G	9. 10.	(United Kingdom) Damon Hill (Germany) Ralf Schumacher	34	4th
1999	(Republic of Ireland) Benson & Hedges Jordan	199	Mugen-Honda MF-301 HD 3.0 V10	B	7. 8.	(United Kingdom) Damon Hill (Germany) Heinz-Harald Frentzen	61	3rd
2000	(Republic of Ireland) Benson & Hedges Jordan	EJ10; EJ10B	Mugen-Honda MF-301 HE 3.0 V10	B	5. 6.	(Germany) Heinz-Harald Frentzen (Italy) Jarno Trulli	17	6th
2001	(Republic of Ireland) Benson & Hedges Jordan Honda	EJ11	Honda RA001E 3.0 V10	B	11. 11. 11./12. 12.	(Germany) Heinz-Harald Frentzen (Brazil) Ricardo Zonta (Italy) Jarno Trulli (France) Jean Alesi	19	5th
2002	(Republic of Ireland) DHL Jordan Honda	EJ12	Honda RA002E 3.0 V10	B	9. 10.	(Italy) Giancarlo Fisichella (Japan) Takuma Sato	9	6th
2003	(Republic of Ireland) Benson & Hedges Jordan Ford	EJ13	Ford RS1 3.0 V10	B	11. 12. 12.	(Italy) Giancarlo Fisichella (Republic of Ireland) Ralph Firman (Hungary) Zsolt Baumgartner	13	9th
2004	(Republic of Ireland) Jordan Ford	EJ14	Ford RS2 3.0 V10	B	18. 19. 19.	(Germany) Nick Heidfeld (Italy) Giorgio Pantano (Germany) Timo Glock	5	9th
2005	(Republic of Ireland) Jordan Grand Prix	EJ15; EJ15B	Toyota RVX-05 3.0 V10	B	18. 19.	(Portugal) Tiago Monteiro (India) Narain Karthikeyan	12	9th
