= Mark Smith (racing engineer) =

British motorsport designer (born 1961)

- Born: 9 March 1961 (age 64)

Mark David Smith (born 9 March 1961) is a British former technical director of the Sauber Formula One team.

== Early life ==
Smith grew up in Pelsall, a village about 15 miles north of Birmingham. He left school to undertake a technical apprenticeship with GKN Automotive who sponsored him to undertake a mechanical engineering degree course at the Wolverhampton Polytechnic, from which he graduated with a first-class honours degree in 1984.

== Motorsport career ==
Having participated in motocross as a youngster, Smith subsequently developed an interest in Formula One. His first job in the motorsport industry was in 1988 at Comtec, the composites wing of March Engineering. From there he joined Reynard Racing Cars in 1989 and started working with Gary Anderson, initially on the 1990 F3000 car.

In 1990, Smith moved to the newly formed Jordan Grand Prix, where he helped to design the Jordan 191 under Anderson, taking responsibility for the gearbox design and engine installation. He stayed at Jordan for 11 years, progressing to the positions of head of mechanical design, and then joint chief designer with Mike Gascoyne. In 2000, Smith followed Gascoyne to Renault, taking the position of chief designer.

After a brief return to Jordan as it transitioned to new ownership, Smith moved to Red Bull Racing in 2005, firstly as deputy technical director and then technical director before moving to Force India as Design Director in 2007. Two years later he was promoted to technical director before moving to Caterham in 2011. He left in 2014 as the struggling team restructured its management in what would be its final season.

Smith was appointed technical director of Sauber F1 Team on 13 July 2015 but left the team a few days before the first race of the 2016 season, with Sauber announcing that he was returning to the UK for "family reasons".

== Career timeline ==
- Chief designer – Jordan Grand Prix (1998–2001).
- Chief designer – Benetton (2001).
- Chief designer – Renault Formula One team (2002–2004).
- Technical director – Jordan Grand Prix (2004–2005).
- Deputy technical director – Red Bull Racing (2005).
- Technical director – Red Bull Racing (2005–2008).
- Design director – Force India Formula One team (2008–2010).
- Technical director – Force India Formula One team (2010–2011).
- Technical director – Team Lotus/Caterham Formula One team (2011–2014).
- Technical director – Sauber Formula One team (2015–2016).
