= Benson & Hedges =

Cigarette brand

- Product type: Cigarette
- Current owner: Altria
- Produced by: Rothmans, Benson & Hedges; Philip Morris USA; British American Tobacco; Japan Tobacco
- Country: England
- Introduced: 1873; 153 years ago
- Markets: See Markets
- Website: bensonandhedges.co.uk

Benson & Hedges is a brand of cigarette originating in England, now owned by American conglomerate Altria. Cigarettes under the Benson & Hedges name are manufactured worldwide by different companies such as Rothmans, Benson & Hedges, Philip Morris USA, British American Tobacco, or Japan Tobacco International (JTI), depending on the region. The brand was founded in London, England in 1873. In the United Kingdom, it is manufactured and sold by JTI.

In the UK, they are registered in Old Bond Street in London, and were manufactured in Lisnafillan, Ballymena, Northern Ireland, before production was moved to Eastern Europe in 2017. In the primary market area, the UK, they are produced by Japan Tobacco. As of November 2025, they are the most popular cigarette brand in the UK.

They are predominantly made from Virginia tobacco.

== History ==
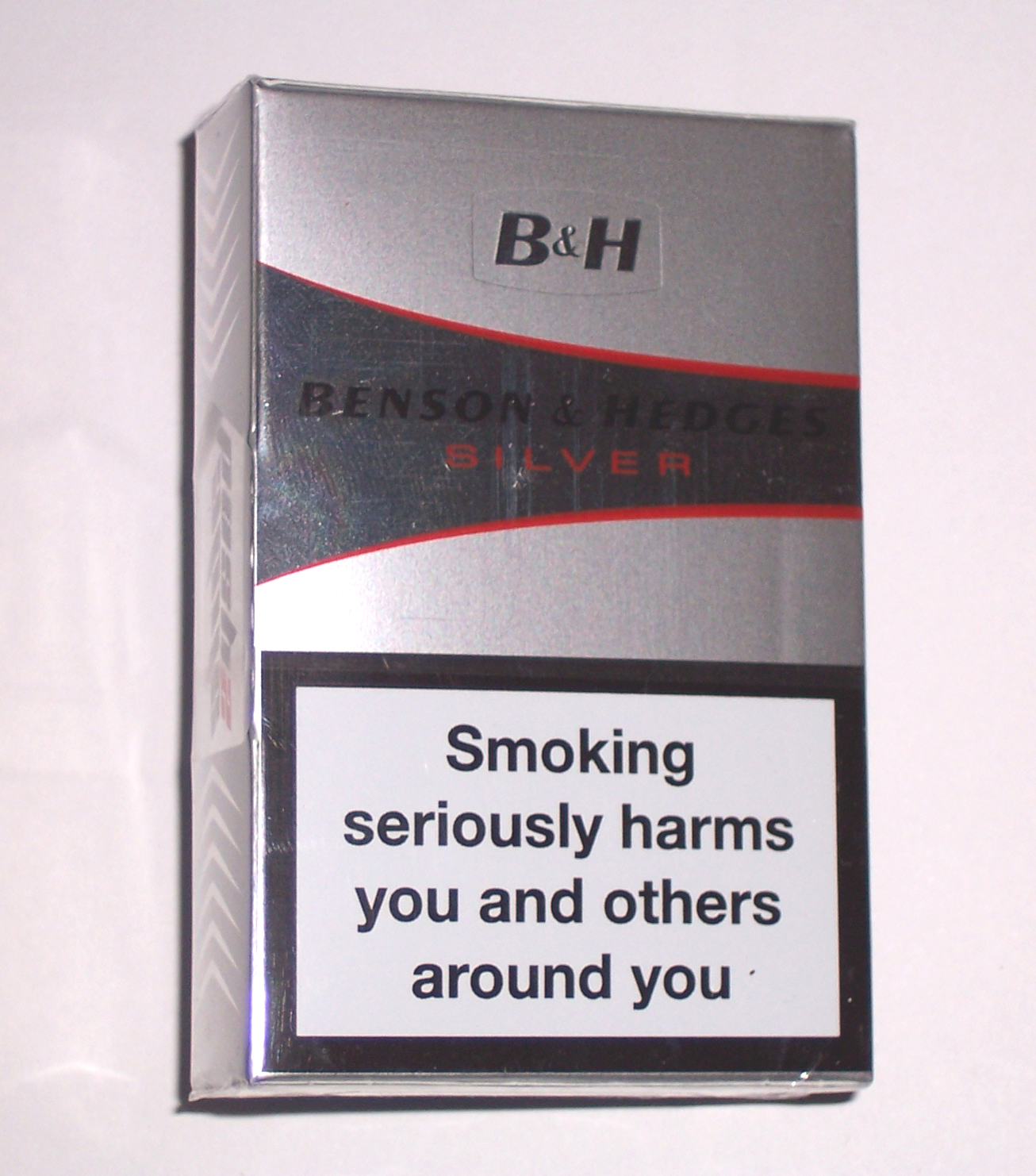
An old pack of English Benson & Hedges cigarettes, with a UK text warning at the bottom of the pack

Benson & Hedges was founded in London in 1873 by Richard Benson and William Hedges as Benson and Hedges Ltd. Alfred Paget Hedges succeeded his father in the business in 1885, the same year which Richard Benson left the business. The 1900s saw branches of Benson & Hedges Ltd. opening in the United States and Canada. In 1928, the American branch became independent, and was bought by Philip Morris in 1958. Benson & Hedges Ltd in the UK was acquired by the Gallaher Group in 1955.

A Royal Warrant was issued to the British company in 1878, after the required five years of supply to the Royal Family. It was revoked in 1999 due to a "lack of demand in the royal households". The Warrant seal, which had previously been on the flip lid of the box, was removed.

== Spin-offs ==
In July 1968, Philip Morris released Virginia Slims which were a spin-off of Benson & Hedges intended to be sold to women. They were sold during a period of time where society was beginning to realize the dangers of smoking. Therefore, they were a thinner and more "elegant" alternative to regular cigarettes.

== Sponsorships ==
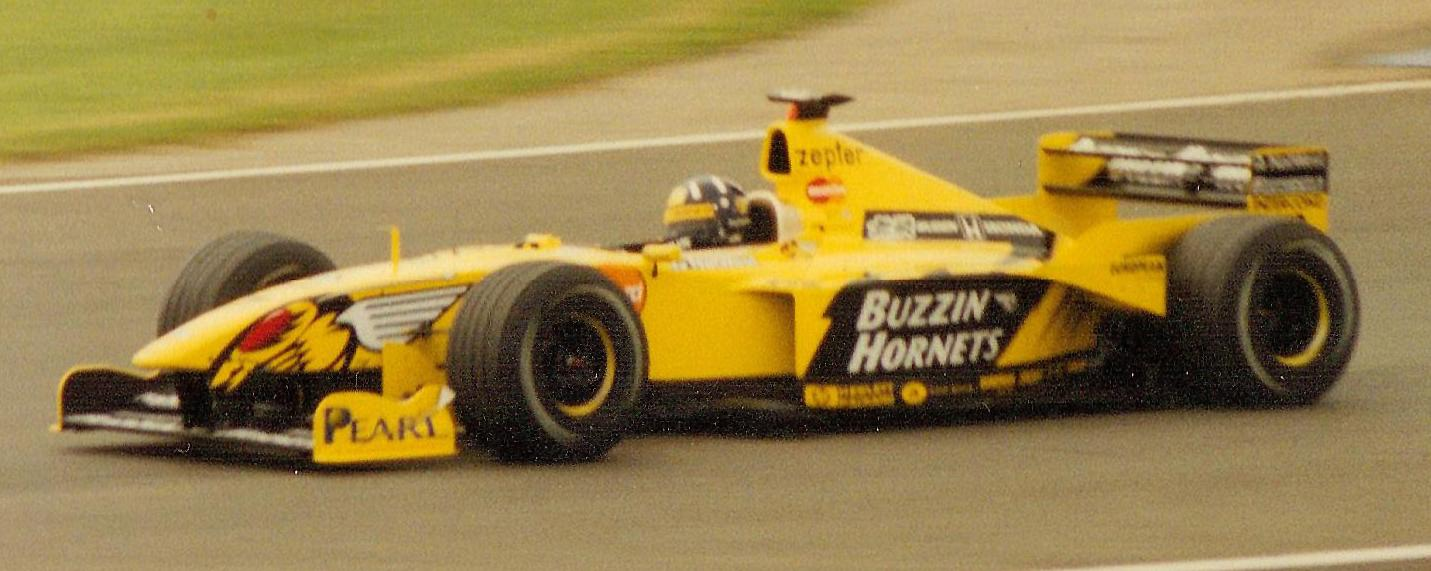
Damon Hill driving for Jordan Grand Prix at the 1999 British Grand Prix. Notice the alternative livery used.

=== Formula 1 ===
From 1996 to 2005, the company was the primary sponsor of the Jordan Grand Prix team. When racing in countries with bans on tobacco advertising (such as the United Kingdom, France and later Germany, Belgium, Canada, United States, Italy, Turkey), the team used alternative liveries such as "Bitten & Hisses", "Buzzin' Hornets", "Bitten Heroes" and "Be on Edge" to bypass the bans on cigarette advertising while still promoting their product.

=== Australian Touring Car Championship ===
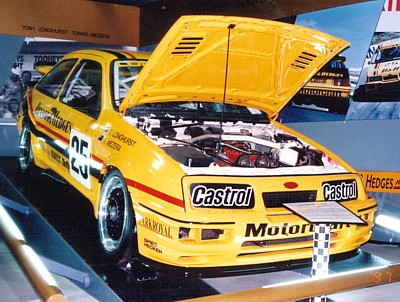
Tony Longhurst's 1988 Bathurst 1000 winning Ford Sierra at the Bathurst museum

Benson & Hedges sponsored Tony Longhurst's team in the 1980s and early 1990s in Australian Touring Car racing. All sponsorships ceased when 1996 federal government legislation banned tobacco advertising at sporting events.

=== Ice skating ===
Benson & Hedges sponsored a touring ice show, "Benson & Hedges on Ice", in the late 1980s.

=== Cricket ===
Throughout the 1970s and 1980s the company was a major sponsor of international cricket, with naming rights for Test Cricket with the home Australia tests and most of the one-day international tournaments held in Australia including the World Series Cup, the World Championship of Cricket held in 1985 to commemorate the 150th anniversary of Victoria and the 1992 Cricket World Cup held by Australia and New Zealand and the English County one day cup competition the Benson & Hedges Cup. The Australian sponsorship ended in 1996 due to the Federal Governments ban on tobacco advertising while the sponsorship in England carried on until 2002 when the UK Government banned tobacco sponsorship which led to the English competition to be replaced by the T20 Cup now known as the T20 Blast.

=== Other ===
Benson & Hedges was a big sponsor of the iD Dunedin Fashion Week in New Zealand from the 1940s until 1995, around the time tobacco sponsorship was banned completely. The Smoke-free Environments Act 1990 was already in force in 1990 which restricted smoking in offices, the public parts of workplaces, and in public and eating places and transport; banned advertising of tobacco products, tobacco sponsorship, and tobacco advertising on other goods, and established a health sponsorship council. Before that however, Benson & Hedges sponsored the fashion week by awarding their tickets in gold cigarette box-inspired packaging and by allowing the women to pick various novelty items and cigarette accessories.

Benson & Hedges sponsored the Symphony of Fire fireworks competitions in Montreal, Quebec, Toronto, Ontario and Vancouver, British Columbia, until tobacco advertising laws passed by the Government of Canada came into force in 2000. Also, on 29 November 2000, Benson & Hedges pulled their sponsorship of the Toronto International Film Festival as a response to the new federal legislation that would come into effect in October 2003 that eliminated tobacco companies' ability to sponsor events and the arts.

Benson & Hedges sponsored the movie B&H Golden Dreams (next B&H Gold & Dreams) and B&H Golden Dreams Extreme on TV3 in the 1990s.

== Controversy ==
=== Canadian class-action lawsuit ===
The three largest Canadian tobacco companies, Imperial Tobacco Canada, JTI-Macdonald Corp, and Rothmans Benson & Hedges, were the subject of the largest class-action lawsuit in Canadian history, brought by current and former smokers. The case started on 12 March 2012 in Quebec Superior Court, and the companies faced a potential payout of C$27 billion (US$27.30 billion) in damages and penalties. In addition, a number of Canadian provinces are teaming up to sue tobacco companies to recover healthcare costs caused by smoking.

On 1 June 2015, Quebec Superior Court Justice Brian Riordan had awarded more than $15 billion to Quebec smokers in a landmark case that pitted them against three Canadian cigarette giants, including JTI-Macdonald Corp.

== Markets ==
The cigarettes are available in Gold or Silver forms, and in some countries also as Red, Green (Menthol), Blue, White and Black. Japan Tobacco also manufactures Hamlet cigars.

In the United States, the brand is owned by Philip Morris USA and available varieties include Kings (box), Menthol (box), Multifilter Kings (soft pack), DeLuxe (box), DeLuxe Menthol (box), Luxury, and Luxury Menthol (soft pack or box). Beginning in 1967, US television ads for the Benson and Hedges brand featured a musical theme (written by Mitch Leigh) called "The Disadvantages Of You;" of which an adapted version charted briefly for a group called The Brass Ring. The commercials humorously depicted various "disadvantages" encountered by smokers struggling to adapt to the unusual length of Benson and Hedges 100s, which were "longer than king-size, at the same price as king-size". These commercials ran until cigarette advertising was banned on US television in 1971. The related print advertising campaign ran for several years afterward.

The brand was or still is sold in the United Kingdom, Ireland, Denmark, Pakistan, Luxembourg, Belgium, Netherlands, Germany, France, Austria, Switzerland, Spain, Ceuta and Melilla, Italy, Cyprus, Poland, Czech Republic, Hungary, Romania, Lithuania, Slovenia, Serbia, Russia, Kazakhstan, Egypt, Nigeria, Sudan, Kenya, South Africa, Seychelles, Thailand, Bangladesh, India, Malaysia, Singapore, Japan, Canada, United States, Mexico, Jamaica, Dominica, Trinidad and Tobago, Argentina, Australia, New Zealand, Croatia .

=== UK market ===
Surreal Benson & Hedges poster at Victoria Station, London, c. 1981

In the 1980s, the company's products were advertised in a series of posters and cinema films which featured the gold pack in various surreal juxtapositions and transformations, devoid of words and people. In 2001, brand was changed from Special Filter to Gold, and a Silver version was introduced, with reduced tar content and 0.1 mg less nicotine, at a slightly cheaper price. In 2008, a 14 cigarette pack was launched, alongside existing 10 and 20 packs. In July 2009, a Gold and Silver versions of rolling tobacco were launched. As of June 2011, the company's UK brands were Gold, Silver, White and Gold Superkings, and rolling tobacco. Discontinued former brands in the UK have included: Sovereign, Gold Bond, Virginia Red, Virginia Blue, and Black.

In October 2012, a new cigarette called Benson and Hedges Dual was introduced. If the smoker prefers a menthol cigarette, they press the capsule inside the filter and the cigarette goes from regular to a menthol tasting cigarette. In 2020, however, this cigarette was taken off the market due to the EU menthol cigarette ban.

As of November 2025, they have 19.4% of the UK cigarette market, meaning it is the most popular cigarette brand in the UK.

=== Overseas markets ===
In the 1930s, Benson & Hedges (Overseas) Ltd was established by Abraham Wix to handle international trade. This branch was acquired by British American Tobacco in 1956. Today, British American Tobacco markets Benson & Hedges throughout Asia and the Pacific, including Australia and New Zealand, but with the exception of Taiwan and the Philippines. The Canadian branch of Benson and Hedges is owned by Philip Morris International.

In Australia, the company's cigarettes are available as Classic 25s, Rich 25s, Smooth 20s, 25s, Subtle 25s, Fine 25s and Ultimate 25s, in the standard Australian plain packaging.

== Products ==
=== United States ===
Products available in the US from 2020.

==== Regular ====
- Benson & Hedges Premium (Full Flavor) 100s
- Benson & Hedges Luxury (Lights) 100s
- Benson & Hedges DeLuxe (Ultra Lights) 100s

==== Menthol ====
- Benson & Hedges Premium (Menthol Full Flavor) 100s
- Benson & Hedges Luxury (Menthol Lights) 100s
- Benson & Hedges DeLuxe (Menthol Ultra Lights) 100s

=== United Kingdom ===
Products available in the UK from May 2020:

- Benson & Hedges Gold (King Size and Superkings)
- Benson & Hedges Silver (King Size only)
- Benson & Hedges New Dual (originally Dual Capsule) (King Size only)
- Benson & Hedges Blue (King Size and Superkings)
- Benson & Hedges Sky Blue (King Size and Superkings)
- Benson & Hedges New Blue Dual (originally Blue Dual Capsule and Double Capsule)(King Size only)
- Benson & Hedges New Green (Superkings only)
- Benson & Hedges Silver Hand Rolling Tobacco (30g pouches only)
- Benson & Hedges Blue Hand Rolling Tobacco (30g and 50g pouches )

==== Canada ====
- Benson & Hedges Prime (Red) King Size 25
- Benson & Hedges Reserve (Black) King Size 25
- Benson & Hedges Deluxe (Gold) King Size 25

==== Australia ====
- Benson & Hedges Smooth Dark Blue 20
- Benson & Hedges Classic Red 20
- Benson & Hedges Smooth Dark Blue 25
- Benson & Hedges Classic Red 25
- Benson & Hedges Fine Silver 25
- Benson & Hedges Smooth Dark Blue 30

== See also ==
- Tobacco smoking
