= 2000 British Grand Prix =

Race 4 of 17 in the 2000 Formula One World Championship
← Previous race	Next race →
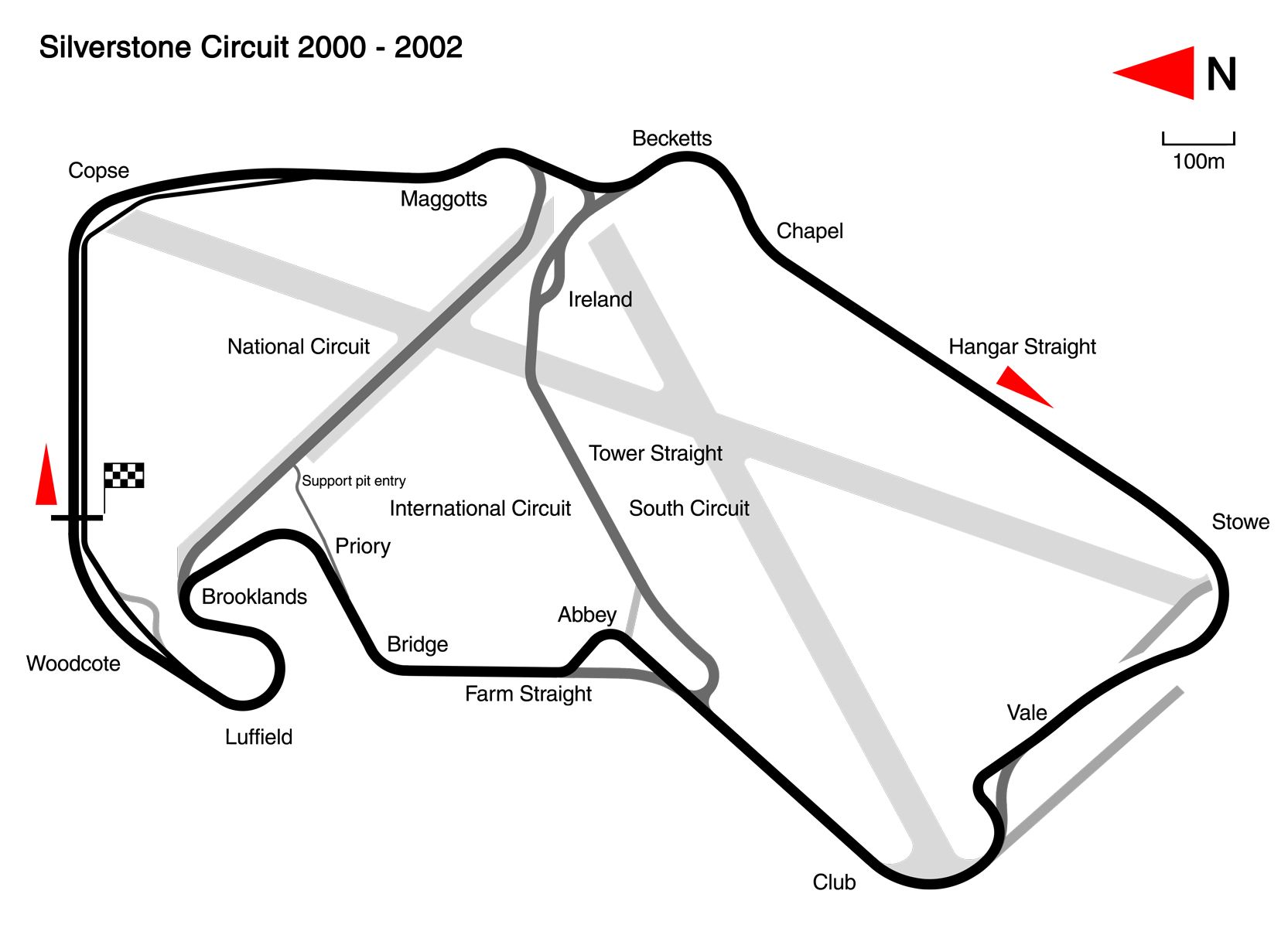
- Track layout of the Silverstone Circuit

Race details
- Date: 23 April 2000
- Official name: LIII Foster's British Grand Prix
- Location: Silverstone Circuit, Silverstone, Northamptonshire and Buckinghamshire, England
- Course: Permanent racing facility
- Course length: 5.140 km (3.194 miles)
- Distance: 60 laps, 308.400 km (191.640 miles)
- Weather: Sunny, mild, dry, Air Temp: 10 °C (50 °F)

Pole position
Driver	(Brazil) Rubens Barrichello	Ferrari
- Time: 1:25.703

Fastest lap
Driver	(Finland) Mika Häkkinen	McLaren-Mercedes
- Time: 1:26.217 on lap 56

Podium
First	(United Kingdom) David Coulthard	McLaren-Mercedes
Second	(Finland) Mika Häkkinen	McLaren-Mercedes
Third	(Germany) Michael Schumacher	Ferrari

The 2000 British Grand Prix (formally the LIII Foster's British Grand Prix) was a Formula One motor race held on 23 April 2000 at the Silverstone Circuit, England, United Kingdom. It was the fourth round of the 2000 Formula One World Championship and was the 51st time that the British Grand Prix had been included in the championship since 1950. McLaren's David Coulthard won the 60-lap race after starting from fourth position. His teammate Mika Häkkinen finished second and Ferrari's Michael Schumacher was third.

Going into the event, Michael Schumacher led the World Drivers' Championship while Ferrari led the World Constructors' Championship. Rubens Barrichello, his teammate, took pole position after setting the quickest lap time in the one-hour qualifying session. Barrichello led for the first 30 laps before failing to upshift and being passed by Coulthard on lap 31. When Coulthard made his sole pit stop two laps later, Barrichello retook the lead until he spun and retired on lap 35 with a hydraulics issue. Five laps later Coulthard regained the lead, which he held for the rest of the race. Despite gearbox problems, he finished 1.4 seconds ahead of his teammate Häkkinen. It was the second time that Coulthard had won the British Grand Prix and was the seventh victory of his F1 career.

As a result of the race, Michael Schumacher maintained his lead in the World Drivers' Championship with 34 championship points, while Coulthard's win moved him from eighth to second. Häkkinen's second-place finish elevated him from fourth to third. Ferrari continued to lead the World Constructors' Championship, but their lead over McLaren was cut to 16 championship points with 13 races remaining in the season.

== Background ==
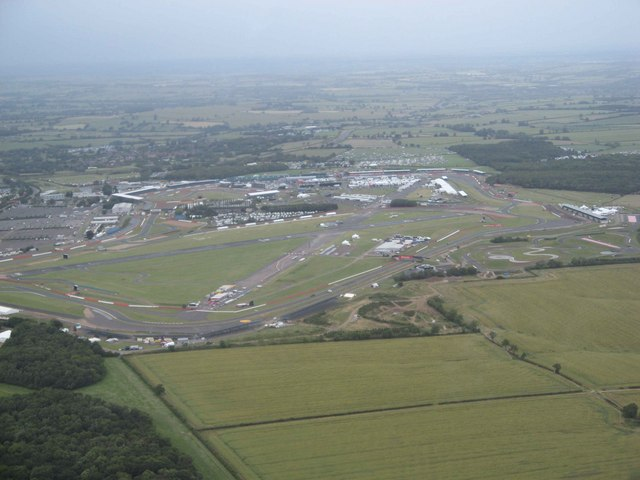
The Silverstone Circuit (pictured in 2008), where the race was held.

=== Entries, tyres and championship standings ===
The 2000 British Grand Prix, formally the LIII Foster's British Grand Prix, was the fourth of seventeen races in the 2000 Formula One World Championship. It was held on 23 April 2000 at the 5.140 km (3.194 mi) Silverstone Circuit in England, United Kingdom. It was the 51st time that the race had been part of the Formula One World Championship since the 1950 Grand Prix. Eleven two-driver teams competed, each representing a different constructor, with no changes to the season entry list. Tyre supplier Bridgestone brought the soft and medium dry compound tyres and the soft and hard wet-weather compounds.

Going into the race, Ferrari's Michael Schumacher led the World Drivers' Championship with 30 championship points, followed by his teammate Rubens Barrichello on nine and Benetton's Giancarlo Fisichella on eight. McLaren's Mika Häkkinen and Williams' Ralf Schumacher were tied on six championship points. Ferrari led the World Constructors' Championship with 39 championship points, McLaren and Benetton were second and third with ten and eight championship points respectively and Jordan and Williams were tied for fourth with seven championship points.

=== Pre-race testing ===
Teams tested at Silverstone from 11 to 14 April to prepare for the next race. There was occasional rain during the period, making the track slippery. Barrichello was fastest on the first day, ahead of Jordan driver Jarno Trulli. Ralf Schumacher was quickest on the second day. British American Racing (BAR) driver Jacques Villeneuve hit a fox at the back of the circuit, limiting his testing time. Michael Schumacher led on the third day. Ricardo Zonta, Villeneuve's teammate, crashed into a spectator enclosure at Stowe corner after his front-right suspension failed and suffered a cut to his right middle finger. BAR withdrew from testing because of Zonta's accident. Michael Schumacher was fastest on the final day. Shakedown testing of the F1-2000 cars was undertaken by Ferrari on 15 April at the Fiorano Circuit in preparation for the British Grand Prix.

=== Scheduling issues ===
The Fédération Internationale de l'Automobile (FIA; Formula One's governing body) moved the event from mid-July to April, when average temperatures in Britain are lower, and the race took place on Easter Sunday 2000. The need to reschedule arose following calendar congestion around July because Easter was later than usual in 2000 since that dictates the date of the Monaco Grand Prix held on the nearest Sunday to Ascension Day, which was later than normal, and the Spanish Grand Prix could not be moved because that race's organisers had trouble finding marshals on a date close to the Rally Catalunya. The Belgian Grand Prix's reinstatement, initially excluded from the calendar due to problems concerning the country's tobacco advertising laws, and the return of the United States Grand Prix were suggested as other reasons. A general consensus was a dispute with Silverstone's owners, the British Racing Drivers' Club, and FIA vice-president Bernie Ecclestone over which track would hold the race was the reason for the move. Ecclestone said he had scheduled the French Grand Prix for April with the British Grand Prix in July though "internal politics" in France had prevented the change. The race was moved back to July from the 2001 season and has been held in the British summer season ever since.

=== Preview ===
Michael Schumacher won the season's first three races while Häkkinen scored only six points due to his McLaren's unreliability. Despite his start to the season, Michael Schumacher declared he would not relax until he had won the championship and would not underestimate Häkkinen, "We have the momentum, but we know how quick and lively Formula One can be. Even though Mika is behind by 24 points, it is still very early in the championship." Häkkinen stated he was frustrated not to score points in the first two races for a better championship standing but that a win at Silverstone was not necessary to secure the title, adding, "But there is still a long way to go in the championship and I am not stressed about it. I believe in my team and I know my car is excellent." McLaren's David Coulthard said winning the race would mean more to him than the year before and he would focus on aiming to be as fast as possible, "To get my first win of the season, and to get it at Silverstone, would be just the business."

A change allowing teams to use modified pit lane speed limiters was a major topic of discussion leading up to the event. The FIA permitted their use as long as they were "hard-coded" below 50 mph (80 km/h), preventing teams from modifying them. The condition was imposed to prevent driver aids such as traction control and launch control from being secretly deployed, but limiters were still allowed to operate the rear light and fuel flap filler. Most drivers agreed that the change lower the risk of drivers being distracted while entering and leaving the pit lane. They did, however, voice fears that they would not drive safely at a slow speed, increasing the danger of hitting mechanics or other car.

Following Zonta's crash, Michael Schumacher intervened, convincing the Silverstone authorities to enlarge the tyre wall at Stowe corner by one tyre in height and two in depth. Schumacher and FIA chief safety delegate Charlie Whiting ordered that the gravel trap around the area be smoothed to prevent cars becoming airborne. Some teams modified their cars for the event. Following Zonta's accident, BAR replaced the carbon elements of their 002 car's suspension with new steel ones. McLaren offered a revised front wing specification, as well as new screens behind the MP4/15's front wheels. McLaren received a lighter, more powerful, and reliable version of Mercedes-Benz's V10 engine, whereas Prost qualified and raced with the most recent version of Peugeot's Evo 3 engine.

== Practice ==
There were four practice sessions held before the Sunday race, two one-hour sessions on Friday 21 April and two 45-minute sessions on Saturday 22 April. The Friday practice sessions began on a dry track in cold weather, but after half an hour, it started to rain heavily. Jordan's Heinz-Harald Frentzen led the first session with a time of 1:27.683, almost half a second quicker than Jaguar's Eddie Irvine. Coulthard, Häkkinen, Trulli, Villeneuve. Barrichello, Benetton's Alexander Wurz, Fisichella and Minardi's Marc Gené (who lost engine air valve pressure, necessitating an engine change) rounded out the session's top ten fastest drivers. An electrical failure on Ralf Schumacher's car prevented him from setting a lap time and he stopped at the pit lane exit. Jaguar's Johnny Herbert was limited to three laps due to a loss of pneumatic valve pressure.

In the second practice session, Frentzen remained fastest with his lap from the previous session; the circuit was too wet for him and others to improve. Clouds of spray reduced visibility, and cars aquaplaned on standing water. Conditions on the track ranged from nearly flooded to wet during the session, as drivers attempted to optimise their cars for a possible wet-weather qualifying session the next day, though no car damage was reported. Almost halfway through the session, Coulthard's McLaren pulled out to the edge of the tarmac surface on the Hangar Straight at the exit of Chapel corner with an hydraulic problem, necessitating a 14-minute red flag stoppage. The Land Rover recovery vehicle became stuck in mud near his car, necessitating the use of a tractor—and Villeneuve nearly struck a marshal assisting Coulthard. The stewards chose to shorten the session instead of extending it for the whole hour.

Sporting personalities criticised the Friday practice sessions being held in wet weather. Michael Schumacher stated that it was "almost impossible to drive and also dangerous" since he was unable to observe events ahead of him or judge the distance between himself and other cars. Coulthard believed that aquaplaning would become a serious issue and recommended that altering the wooden plank underneath the car could help alleviate the issue, "It's not comfortable for any of us, we all do it because we all want to win races but really to be going along the straight not knowing whether the car is going to stay in a straight line or not is very difficult." Three-time world champion Jackie Stewart blamed the FIA for damaging Formula One's image by holding the event in April.

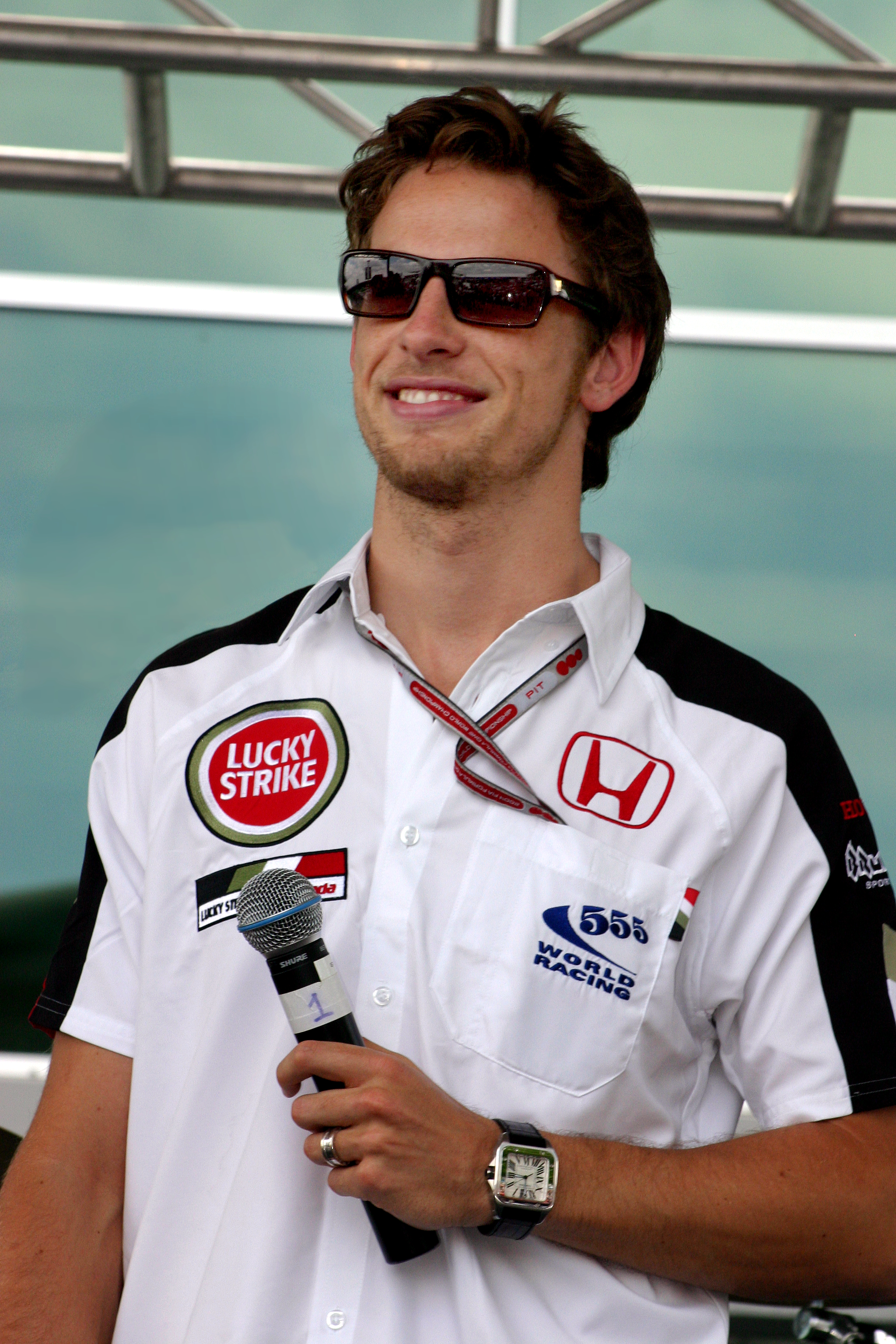
Jenson Button (pictured in 2004) spun into the gravel trap and was then hit by Eddie Irvine's Jaguar.

The weather remained wet for the Saturday morning practice sessions, with a lot of water being lifted into the air from the track. Coulthard lapped fastest in the third session at 1:33.614; Häkkinen, Michael Schumacher, Ralf Schumacher, Barrichello, the Jordan duo of Frentzen and Trulli, Sauber's duo of Mika Salo and Pedro Diniz and Arrows' Jos Verstappen followed in the top ten. Several drivers went off the wet track during the session. Diniz spun off the track at Club corner, damaging his car's front suspension triangle and nose cone in a crash with the tyre barrier. Before the end of the session, Williams driver Jenson Button slid into the gravel trap at turn 14 after leaving Priory turn, and his stationary car stopped near the barrier. Button was then hit by Irvine's Jaguar while attempting to extricate himself from the gravel. The Williams car's front and back suspension were broken whilst the Jaguar's monocoque was punctured. Both drivers were unhurt. Fisichella set no lap times because of an engine oil leak caused by his team changing his engine. His team changed engines between the final two sessions.

In the final practice session, which took place on a gradually drying track after the rain had ceased, Häkkinen set the fastest lap time of 1:33.132 with one minute remaining. Michael Schumacher, Coulthard, Barrichello, Ralf Schumacher, Fisichella, Frentzen, Verstappen, Trulli and Salo were in positions two to ten. Neither Button nor Irvine took part in the session following their accident because their cars needed repairing. Some drivers lost control of their cars on the track. Villeneuve went off the track at Club corner, but narrowly avoided a collision with a tyre barrier and returned to the circuit. The engine of Prost's Jean Alesi failed halfway around the track, causing flames to emerge from the rear of his car on the way to the pit lane after 25 minutes of the session.

== Qualifying ==
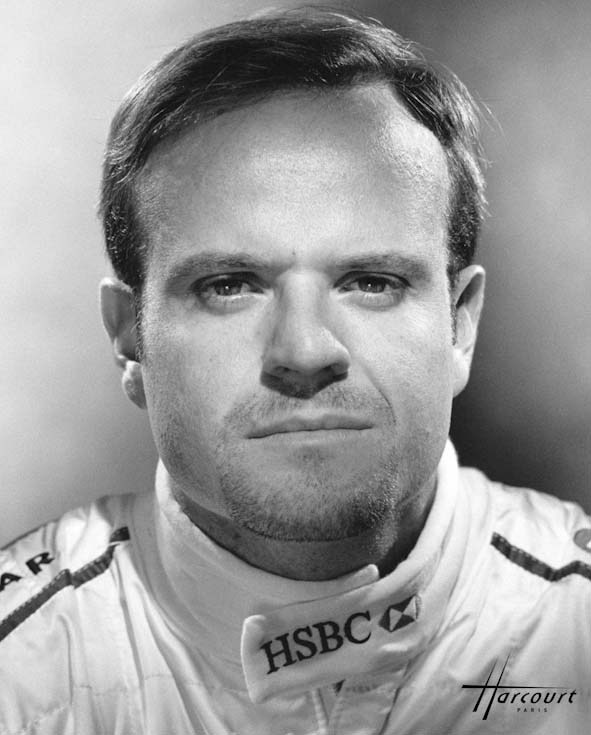
Rubens Barrichello (pictured in 1999) took the third pole position of his career in the qualifying session.

The stewards permitted qualifying to proceed as planned despite the weather conditions. Each driver was limited to twelve laps during the one-hour qualifying session on Saturday 22 April, with the starting order determined by their fastest laps. The 107% rule was in force during this session, which required each driver to set a time within 107% of the fastest lap to qualify for the race. The session was held in cloudy weather on a drying race track, with plenty of standing water. Drivers entered the circuit on scrubbed wet-weather tyres early in the session, hoping to set quick laps if rain fell, which never did. Lap times improved as the course gradually dried due to wind and sunlight exposure, and 15 drivers held provisional pole position. With a time of 1:25.703, Barrichello secured his third career pole position and first for Ferrari. He was ahead of Frentzen in second, who recorded a lap 0.003 seconds slower, despite losing control of his car on the grass at Stowe corner. It was also his best qualifying performance of the season. Häkkinen, in his first qualifying session of the season, did not secure pole position following three prior poles. On his final quick lap, he qualified third after having to slow down due to a driver error, and a understeer on his race car was remedied by fixing a setup fault. He lost a lap for slowing to allow Barrichello to past on the latter's pole lap. Coulthard was the highest-placed British driver in fourth, after encountering traffic on his final qualifying attempts and failing to set a clean lap. Michael Schumacher, who changed his car only to make more errors, qualified fifth and missed his final lap by 0.1 seconds due to Trulli causing a yellow flag, leaving two of his remaining allocated laps untaken. Both Button and Ralf Schumacher in sixth and seventh had mixed feelings over their performances. Ralf Schumacher gave up his first two runs to avoid being hampered by slower cars, but he ran wide.

Verstappen briefly claimed pole position in the last seconds of qualifying before spinning off and taking eighth, Arrows' best qualifying result since Salo qualified sixth for the 1998 Austrian Grand Prix. Irvine finished ninth after Jaguar put three laps of fuel in his car, costing him two-tenths of a second. Villeneuve took tenth on the soft compound tyre, after regaining control of his car in a broadside slide through Abbey turn. Trulli qualified eleventh, but was unable to lap faster after being held up by a Williams car and spinning off the track. He led Fisichella in the faster Benetton cars, despite car balance issues, driver errors at turn ten and slower cars. Diniz qualified 13th, eight tenths of a second ahead of teammate Salo in 18th, both hampered by the timing of their runs. Herbert encountered yellow flags during qualifying and forced to end his final quick lap because of engine problems and Häkkinen slowing put his line at Becketts turn narrower. He was followed by Alesi and Nick Heidfeld in the Prost cars, who separated Zonta. Behind Heidfeld, who took the spare Prost car since his was not ready, and whose engine failed on his fastest run, Pedro de la Rosa in the slower Arrows took 19th, making a mistake during his final qualifying run that cost him pace and almost saw him lose control of his car towards the end of the lap. Wurz took 20th after driving the spare Benetton car due to an unidentified problem with his race car. The Minardi team sent both drivers out late in the session after working on their cars' setups and Gené and Gastón Mazzacane (who lost six-tenths of a second encountering traffic on his final run) took 21st and 22nd places.

=== Qualifying classification ===
Pos	No.	Driver	Constructor	Time	Gap
1	4	(Brazil) Rubens Barrichello	Ferrari	1:25.703	—
2	5	(Germany) Heinz-Harald Frentzen	Jordan-Mugen-Honda	1:25.706	+0.003
3	1	(Finland) Mika Häkkinen	McLaren-Mercedes	1:25.741	+0.038
4	2	(United Kingdom) David Coulthard	McLaren-Mercedes	1:26.088	+0.385
5	3	(Germany) Michael Schumacher	Ferrari	1:26.161	+0.458
6	10	(United Kingdom) Jenson Button	Williams-BMW	1:26.733	+1.030
7	9	(Germany) Ralf Schumacher	Williams-BMW	1:26.786	+1.083
8	19	(Netherlands) Jos Verstappen	Arrows-Supertec	1:26.793	+1.090
9	7	(United Kingdom) Eddie Irvine	Jaguar-Cosworth	1:26.818	+1.115
10	22	(Canada) Jacques Villeneuve	BAR-Honda	1:27.025	+1.322
11	6	(Italy) Jarno Trulli	Jordan-Mugen-Honda	1:27.164	+1.461
12	11	(Italy) Giancarlo Fisichella	Benetton-Playlife	1:27.253	+1.550
13	16	(Brazil) Pedro Diniz	Sauber-Petronas	1:27.301	+1.598
14	8	(United Kingdom) Johnny Herbert	Jaguar-Cosworth	1:27.461	+1.758
15	14	(France) Jean Alesi	Prost-Peugeot	1:27.559	+1.856
16	23	(Brazil) Ricardo Zonta	BAR-Honda	1:27.772	+2.069
17	15	(Germany) Nick Heidfeld	Prost-Peugeot	1:27.806	+2.103
18	17	(Finland) Mika Salo	Sauber-Petronas	1:28.110	+2.407
19	18	(Spain) Pedro de la Rosa	Arrows-Supertec	1:28.135	+2.432
20	12	(Austria) Alexander Wurz	Benetton-Playlife	1:28.205	+2.502
21	20	(Spain) Marc Gené	Minardi-Fondmetal	1:28.253	+2.550
22	21	(Argentina) Gastón Mazzacane	Minardi-Fondmetal	1:29.174	+3.471
107% time: 1:31.702

== Warm-up ==
The rain had stopped by Sunday morning, and a half-hour warm-up session was scheduled to begin at 08:30 BST (UTC+1), but Whiting delayed it by 100 minutes due to persistent heavy fog that prevented the medical helicopter from arriving at the track or flying to nearby hospitals. The Drivers' Parade was cancelled because of the delays. The McLaren drivers were faster than in qualifying, with Coulthard setting the quickest time of 1:26.800. Häkkinen finished fourth in the other McLaren, two-tenths of a second behind Coulthard. De la Rosa and Ralf Schumacher split them in second and third, respectively. Following one slow lap, Häkkinen's race car had a pneumatic engine valve sensor failure, forcing him to drive the spare McLaren until the problem was addressed. Heidfeld's engine cover detached from his car and landed in the middle of the track, prompting the waving of yellow flags to clear the carbon fibre debris. His team successfully installed a new cover.

== Race ==
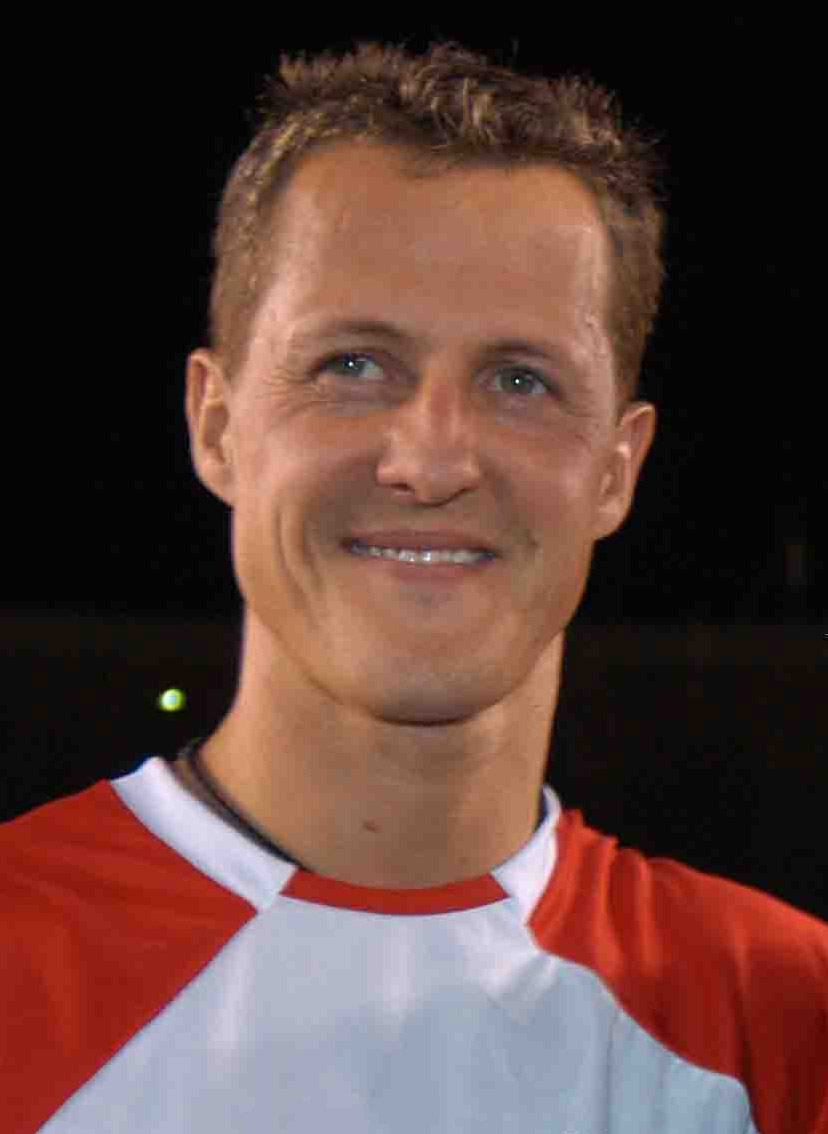
Michael Schumacher (pictured in 2005) finished the Grand Prix in third position.

The 60-lap race, which began at 13:00 local time on 23 April 2000, drew between 60,000 and 140,000 spectators. (Note: Sources vary on the attendance, including 60,000, 100,000, 135,000, or 140,000.) The weather improved after the warm-up session, and it was dry, cold and sunny before the race; conditions were expected to remain consistent throughout the race, with a 40% chance of rain. A majority of the leading drivers planned for a single pit stop, meaning drivers had to overtake on the circuit and to drive without aerodynamic turbulence affecting them to either undercut or overcut others. When the five red lights went out to start the race, Barrichello maintained the lead into the first corner, with Frentzen second. Michael Schumacher was stymied by the slow-starting Häkkinen on the outside and Button on his right. He chose to turn left, but his left-hand tyres went into the wet grass, causing side-by-side contact with Häkkinen. This forced Michael Schumacher to slow, falling behind Button and Villeneuve. Coulthard overtook both his teammate Häkkinen and Michael Schumacher as they duelled. Button entered the apex of Maggots corner, forcing Villeneuve and Michael Schumacher to slow. Frentzen tried to overtake Barrichello for the lead into Stowe corner at the end of the Hangar Straight, but he was too far away. Michael Schumacher passed Villeneuve at Stowe corner and battled his brother Ralf Schumacher for sixth until the entry for Bridge corner, when the former slowed on the inside to avoid a collision. Villeneuve moved from tenth to sixth by the end of the first lap.

At the end of the first lap, Barrichello led Frentzen's heavier and less powerful car by 0.4 seconds, followed by Coulthard, Häkkinen, Button, and Villeneuve. Barrichello began to maintain a one-second advantage over Frentzen. Villeneuve oversteered through the Maggots, Becketts, and Chapel turns, and Ralf Schumacher slipstreamed past him on the inside entering Stowe corner on the Hangar Straight for sixth by braking later on lap two. Alesi dropped to 13th after being passed by Salo, and Diniz dropped three places due to an incident. The leading drivers had gradually pulled away from Trulli by lap three. Michael Schumacher was behind Villeneuve because the BARs were faster on the straights while being a second slower than the six drivers ahead of him and Schumacher was coming under pressure from Verstappen. Two laps later, Wurz gained another position by passing Zonta for 15th. Häkkinen drove wide on lap eight after he outbraked himself into Brooklands corner and was pressured by Button.

By the 14th lap, Barrichello had a six-tenths of a second advantage over Frentzen, who was nine-tenths of a second ahead of Coulthard. Häkkinen was nine-tenths of a second behind his teammate and continued to battle Button for fourth place, who was still 1.1 seconds clear of Ralf Schumacher. Wurz, who was pressuring Alesi in 14th, became the first driver to make a pit stop to ensure he would get a clear track. Salo and Fisichella made pit stops over the next three laps. Verstappen in ninth slowed on lap 20 due to electrical issues in his car's engine that had emerged six or seven laps earlier and was forced to retire from the race after Arrows were unable to fix the problem. Frentzen and Ralf Schumacher were the next two drivers to make pit stops on lap 24, returning to the track in seventh and eighth, respectively, despite the latter's team having difficulty attaching his right-rear wheel to his car due to a loose wheel nut. Button made his pit stop one lap later and joined behind teammate Ralf Schumacher. On lap 28, De la Rosa retired at the pit lane's side due to a hydraulic clutch failure.

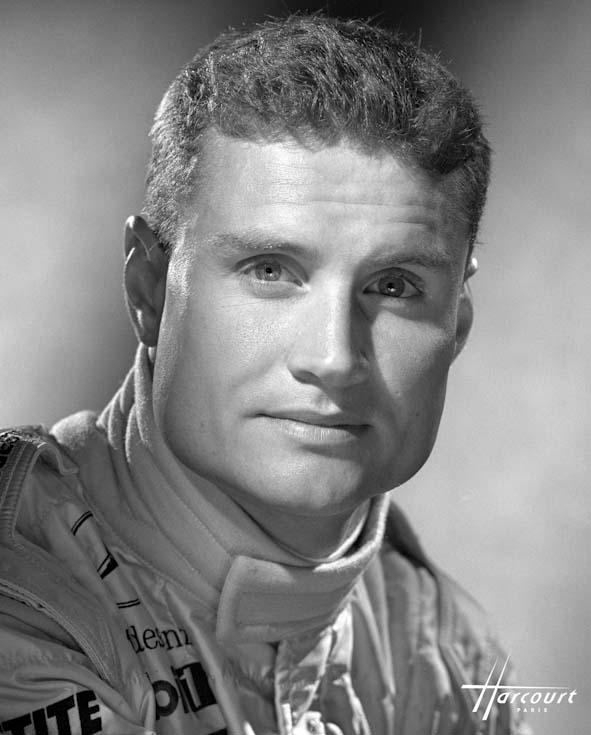
David Coulthard (pictured in 1999) won the British Grand Prix for the second successive year and took his seventh career victory despite a gearbox fault late in the race.

With Frentzen's stop releasing him into air that had not been affected by turbulence from other cars, Coulthard started to gain on Barrichello, who began having clutch and electrical throttle pedal issues around lap 29. Two laps later, Barrichello was slow out of Chapel corner because he missed an upshift going on the Hangar Straight. This allowed Coulthard to slipstream Barrichello's rear down the straight and draw alongside him into Stowe corner on the outside. He repelled Barrichello's block, which he manufactured by faking a right turn to become the new race leader while braking. Coulthard immediately began to pull away from Barrichello. Häkkinen was the first one-stopping driver to make his only pit stop of the race from third at the end of the same lap and changed a flat-spotted tyre. He rejoined in eighth. Coulthard and Villeneuve both made pit stops on lap 33; Coulthard rejoined the track in fourth, behind Frentzen. Due to an unstable engine, Barrichello lost control of his Ferrari's rear in the middle of the entry to Luffield turn leading to the pit lane entrance. He elected to enter the pit lane on lap 35, surprising his mechanics. Barrichello had to retire after a high pressure hydraulic malfunction rendered his clutch unusable, preventing him from exiting his pit stall.

Michael Schumacher, no longer hampered by Villeneuve, took the race lead after Barrichello retired and set a new fastest lap of the race on lap 36, a 1:26.797, pulling out a gap before his pit stop by lapping a second quicker than the field. Zonta retired on the next lap after spinning into the gravel trap at the exit of Stowe circuit due to a driver error that sent him wide. Michael Schumacher made a 8.8-second pit stop on lap 38, promoting Frentzen to the lead. He returned to the track in sixth, ahead of Villeneuve. The Jordan driver made a pit stop on lap 42 handing the lead back to Coulthard. The Williams pair both made pit stops over the next two laps, promoting Häkkinen and Michael Schumacher into second and third positions. Michael Schumacher was unable to catch Häkkinen due to slower drivers impeding him. Herbert was the final driver to make a planned pit stop on lap 48, allowing his crew to re-pressurise his car's hydraulic pressure system. When lap 49 ended with the scheduled pit stops completed the top six drivers were Coulthard, Häkkinen, Michael Schumacher, Frentzen, Ralf Schumacher and Button. Häkkinen started to gain on Coulthard on lap 51 who had a minor gearbox issue caused by a technical fault. Coulthard felt the problem but was not alerted of its seriousness by his race engineer Pat Fry over radio. On the same lap, Frentzen began to slow due to a gear selection issue, forcing him to drive in sixth gear, dropping behind Ralf Schumacher and Button.

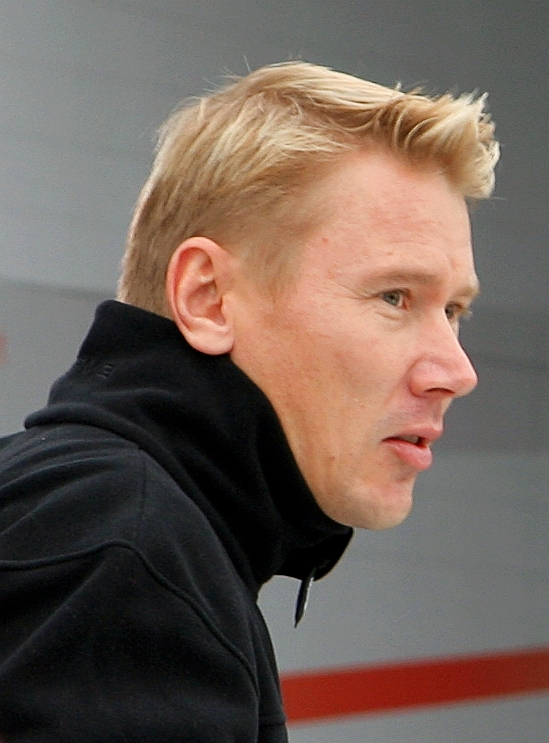
Mika Häkkinen (pictured in 2006) finished in second, 1.4 seconds behind his teammate Coulthard.

Heidfeld retired from the event on the following lap after spinning into the gravel at Becketts corner due to an oil pressure problem and engine failure. Frentzen drove slowly to the pit lane to retire on lap 54. On lap 56, Häkkinen set a new fastest lap of the race, a 1:26.217 as he continued close on Coulthard, despite McLaren showing him an "Easy" pit board to slow. Villeneuve was passed by Trulli for sixth into Priory corner on lap 57, before retiring from the event with a gearbox selection issue caused by the hydraulic system. Coulthard slowed in the last laps to preserve his car, and he held off Häkkinen to win his second consecutive British Grand Prix and seventh in Formula One. Häkkinen finished second, 1.4 seconds behind, with Michael Schumacher third. Ralf Schumacher finished fourth, distancing his teammate Button in fifth when the latter's exhaust broke, forcing him to have difficulties hearing his team over the radio. Trulli completed the points scorers in sixth. Fisichella finished seventh, ahead of Salo in eighth who had understeer in the final laps. Wurz, Alesi, and Diniz took the following three spots. Herbert and Irvine finished 12th and 13th in their Jaguars due to clutch issues. Gené and Mazzacane finished in the following two places, both lacking power. Villeneuve and Frentzen were the final classified finishers, despite retiring. 17 of the 22 starters finished the Grand Prix.

=== Post-race ===
The top three drivers appeared on the podium to collect their trophies and, in the subsequent press conference, Coulthard stated that passing Barrichello gave him an advantage during the pit stops. Coulthard additionally revealed that was inspired by 1992 World Drivers' Champion Nigel Mansell's overtake on Nelson Piquet at the 1987 British Grand Prix to execute his pass on Barrichello. He also believed that his victory made him confident about posing a challenge for the Drivers' Championship saying "my best years are still ahead of me." Häkkinen said his start to the race was the sort that most affected the race result, adding that his car was imbalanced, "To find a good balance in the car you must first get a good run in the morning. I was lacking that, so I was unable to get the best balance in the car." Michael Schumacher said he was satisfied to finish third, adding, "For most of the race I was running in 8th position, and I was wondering how the race would develop and how many points I was going to lose. At that stage I was quite happy to see Rubens in first place, taking points away from the guys like Mika and David."

Button was ecstatic to score two championship points for finishing fifth at Silverstone, saying, "To think that a year ago I was camped out in a motorhome in the middle of the circuit and only went down to Stowe to watch the last couple of laps – it is pretty amazing. I remember thinking that I might be testing in the week leading up to the race, but that was it." Barrichello expressed disappointment at losing the opportunity to win his first Grand Prix due to his retirement, adding that his clutch and throttle troubles allowed Coulthard to pass him. Frentzen felt his Jordan team should have been able to finish in the first four places because their two-stop strategy was allowing them to be close to McLaren and Ferrari, "We were competitive all weekend, so it is frustrating to come away without points." Villeneuve was surprised at how easy it was to stay ahead of Michael Schumacher, but disappointed that unreliability stopped him from scoring a point that could have been significant at the season's end.

FIA president Max Mosley and Ecclestone received significant criticism for moving the race to April from July. Mosley said Formula One's governing body would move the event back to July if they could, refuting the suggestion that disagreements between Silverstone and Ecclestone forced the race to be held in April, "We have not gone looking for problems. Everyone thinks that we want to upset Silverstone but we don't." Michael Schumacher continued to the World Drivers' Championship with 34 championship points following the race. Coulthard's victory moved him from eighth to second place with 14 championship points. Häkkinen's second-place finish moved him up from fourth to third and put him on 12 championship points. Barrichello's retirement dropped him from second to fourth, while Ralf Schumacher remained in fifth. Ferrari maintained its World Constructors' Championship lead with 43 championship points, while McLaren closed to within 17 championship points. Williams went from fifth to third, while Benetton and Jordan dropped to fourth and fifth, respectively, with 13 races remaining in the season.

=== Race classification ===
Pos	No.	Driver	Constructor	Laps	Time/Retired	Grid	Points
1	2	(United Kingdom) David Coulthard	McLaren-Mercedes	60	1:28:50.108	4	10
2	1	(Finland) Mika Häkkinen	McLaren-Mercedes	60	+1.477	3	6
3	3	(Germany) Michael Schumacher	Ferrari	60	+19.917	5	4
4	9	(Germany) Ralf Schumacher	Williams-BMW	60	+41.312	7	3
5	10	(United Kingdom) Jenson Button	Williams-BMW	60	+57.759	6	2
6	6	(Italy) Jarno Trulli	Jordan-Mugen-Honda	60	+1:19.273	11	1
7	11	(Italy) Giancarlo Fisichella	Benetton-Playlife	59	+1 Lap	12	
8	17	(Finland) Mika Salo	Sauber-Petronas	59	+1 Lap	18	
9	12	(Austria) Alexander Wurz	Benetton-Playlife	59	+1 Lap	20	
10	14	(France) Jean Alesi	Prost-Peugeot	59	+1 Lap	15	
11	16	(Brazil) Pedro Diniz	Sauber-Petronas	59	+1 Lap	13	
12	8	(United Kingdom) Johnny Herbert	Jaguar-Cosworth	59	+1 Lap	14	
13	7	(United Kingdom) Eddie Irvine	Jaguar-Cosworth	59	+1 Lap	9	
14	20	(Spain) Marc Gené	Minardi-Fondmetal	59	+1 Lap	21	
15	21	(Argentina) Gastón Mazzacane	Minardi-Fondmetal	59	+1 Lap	22	
16	22	(Canada) Jacques Villeneuve	BAR-Honda	56	Gearbox	10	
17	5	(Germany) Heinz-Harald Frentzen	Jordan-Mugen-Honda	54	Gearbox	2	
Ret	15	(Germany) Nick Heidfeld	Prost-Peugeot	51	Engine	17	
Ret	23	(Brazil) Ricardo Zonta	BAR-Honda	36	Spun off	16	
Ret	4	(Brazil) Rubens Barrichello	Ferrari	35	Hydraulics	1	
Ret	18	(Spain) Pedro de la Rosa	Arrows-Supertec	26	Electrical	19	
Ret	19	(Netherlands) Jos Verstappen	Arrows-Supertec	20	Electrical	8	

== Championship standings after the race ==
Drivers' Championship standings

+/–	Pos	Driver	Points
	1	(Germany) Michael Schumacher	34
6	2	(United Kingdom) David Coulthard	14
1	3	(Finland) Mika Häkkinen	12
2	4	(Brazil) Rubens Barrichello	9
	5	(Germany) Ralf Schumacher	9

Constructors' Championship standings

+/–	Pos	Constructor	Points
	1	(Italy) Ferrari	43
	2	(United Kingdom) McLaren-Mercedes	26
2	3	(United Kingdom) Williams-BMW	12
1	4	(Italy) Benetton-Playlife	8
1	5	(Republic of Ireland) Jordan-Mugen-Honda	8
Sources:

- Note: Only the top five positions are included for both sets of standings.

== Notes ==
Previous race: 2000 San Marino Grand Prix	FIA Formula One World Championship; 2000 season	Next race: 2000 Spanish Grand Prix
Previous race: 1999 British Grand Prix	British Grand Prix	Next race: 2001 British Grand Prix
