= McLaren MP4/15 =

Formula One racing car

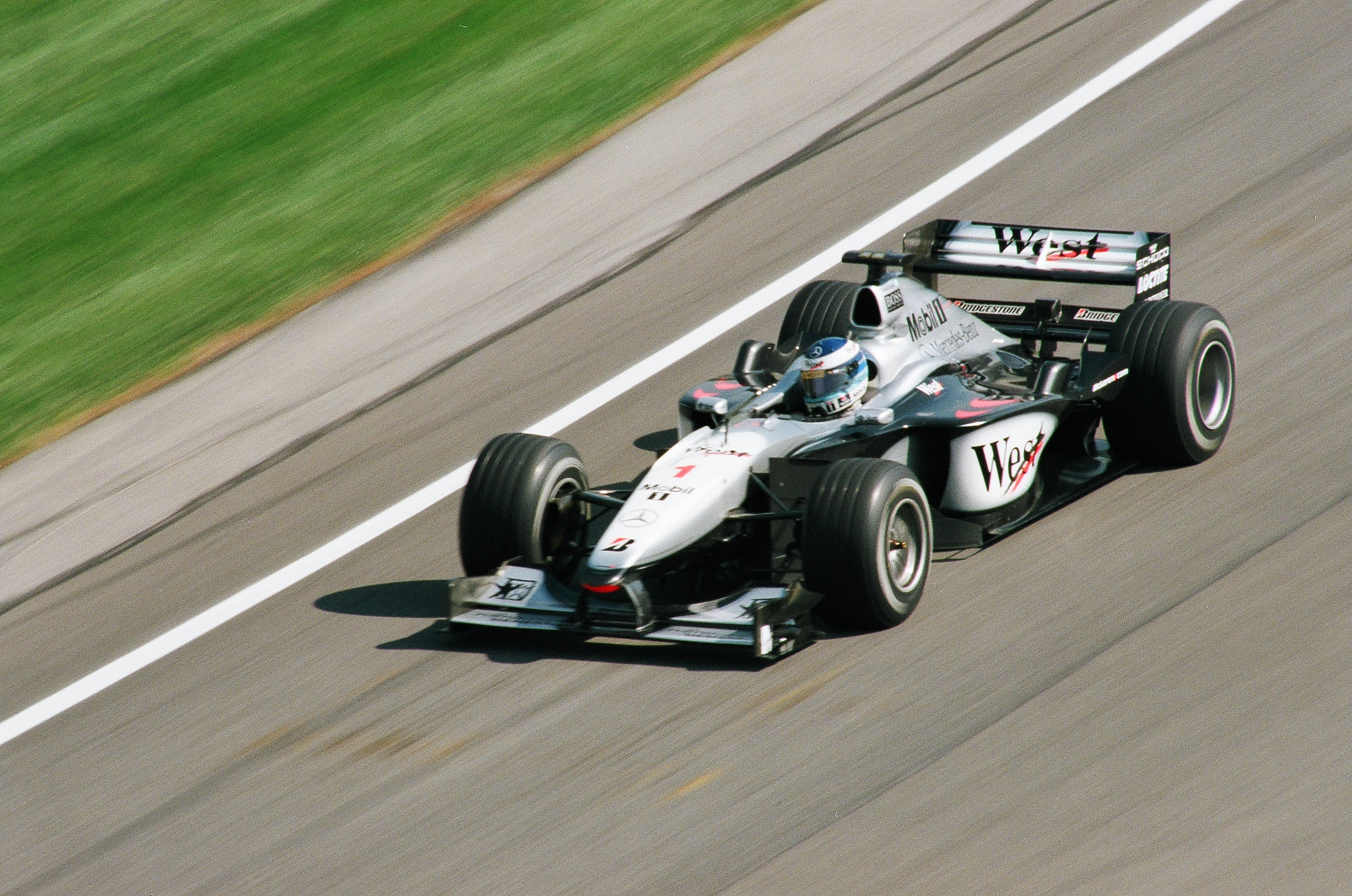
- Mika Häkkinen driving the MP4/15 at the 2000 United States Grand Prix
- Category: Formula One
- Constructor: McLaren
- Designers: Adrian Newey (Technical Director); Neil Oatley (Chief Designer); Steve Nichols (Engineering Director); Matthew Jeffreys (Head of Vehicle Design); David North (Head of Transmission); David Neilson (Head of Suspension); Paddy Lowe (Head of R&D); Henri Durand (Head of Aerodynamics); Mario Illien (Technical Director, Engine - Ilmor-Mercedes); Stuart Grove (Chief Designer, Engine - Ilmor-Mercedes)
- Predecessor: MP4/14
- Successor: MP4-16

Technical specifications
- Chassis: Carbon-fibre monocoque
- Suspension (front): Double wishbones, pushrod
- Suspension (rear): Double wishbones, pushrod
- Engine: Mercedes-Benz FO110J, V10 (72°) naturally aspirated
- Transmission: McLaren 7-speed longitudinal sequential, semi-automatic.
- Battery: GS
- Power: 815 hp (608 kW) @ 17,800 rpm
- Fuel: Mobil
- Lubricants: Mobil 1
- Tyres: Bridgestone

Competition history
- Notable entrants: West McLaren Mercedes
- Notable drivers: 1. (Finland) Mika Häkkinen; 2. (United Kingdom) David Coulthard
- Debut: 2000 Australian Grand Prix
- First win: 2000 British Grand Prix
- Last win: 2000 Belgian Grand Prix
- Last event: 2000 Malaysian Grand Prix
Races	Wins	Poles	F/Laps
17	7	7	12
- Constructors' Championships: 0
- Drivers' Championships: 0

The McLaren MP4/15 was a Formula One car used by the McLaren-Mercedes team in the 2000 Formula One World Championship.

== Overview ==
The chassis was designed by Adrian Newey, Steve Nichols, Neil Oatley and Henri Durand with Mario Illien designing the bespoke Ilmor engine. The car proved highly competitive and scored seven victories just like its predecessor the MP4/14, but was narrowly beaten to both the Drivers' and Constructors' championships by the Ferrari F1-2000.

During the season, the team was deducted 10 constructors points at the Austrian Grand Prix after one of the FIA-mandated seals were found to be missing; no evidence of tampering was found.

== Steering wheel ==
Mika Häkkinen and David Coulthard used different shaped MP4/15 steering wheels. Häkkinen's version was the butterfly-style wheel, and Coulthard's included a lower grip. McLaren used four gearshift paddles in the MP4/15. The two blue paddles are the gear selectors, while the lower pair allow the driver to operate the clutch with either hand.

== Sponsorship and livery ==
McLaren used 'West' logos, except at the British and French Grands Prix where it used their drivers' first names.

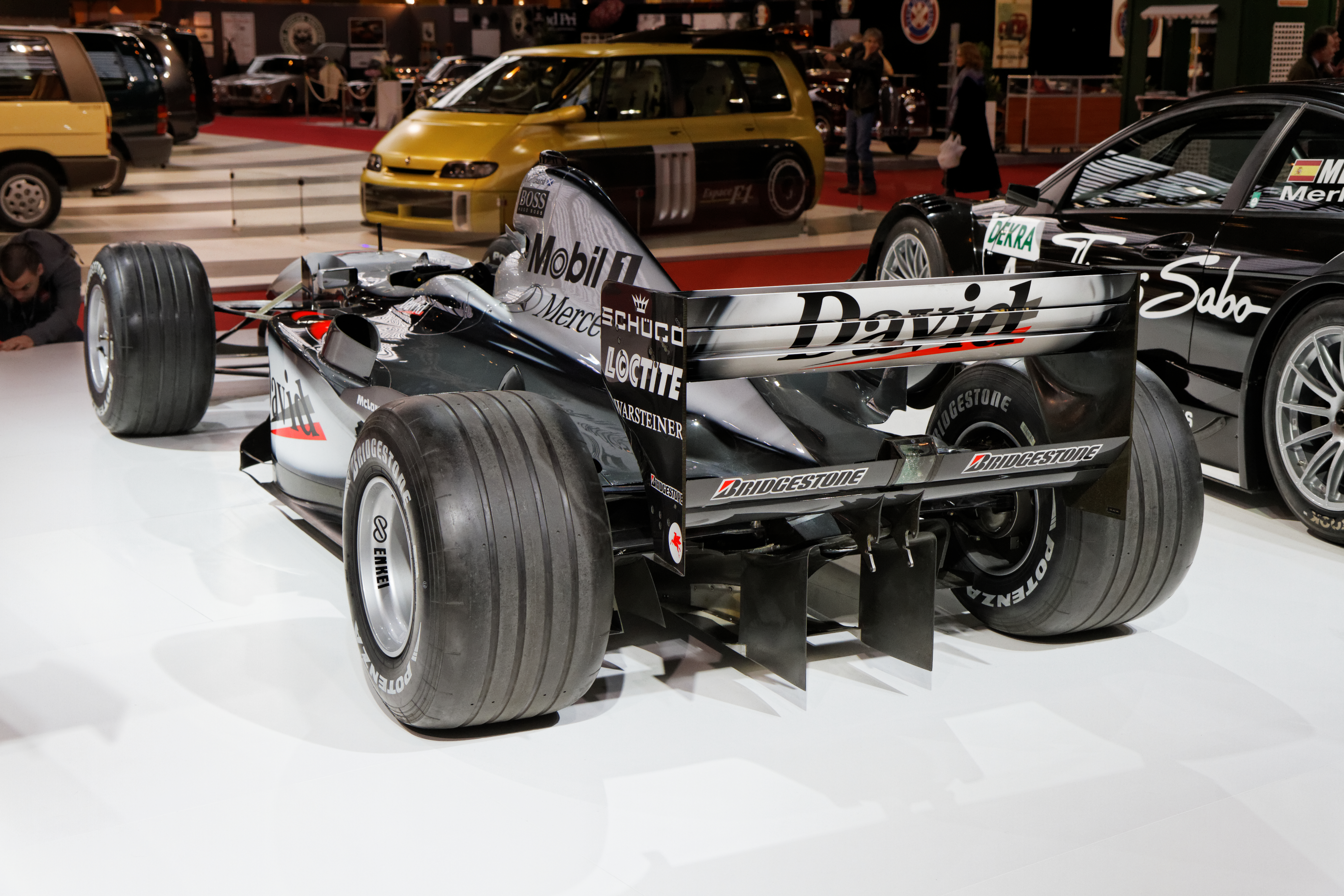
David Coulthard's first name replacing the West logo

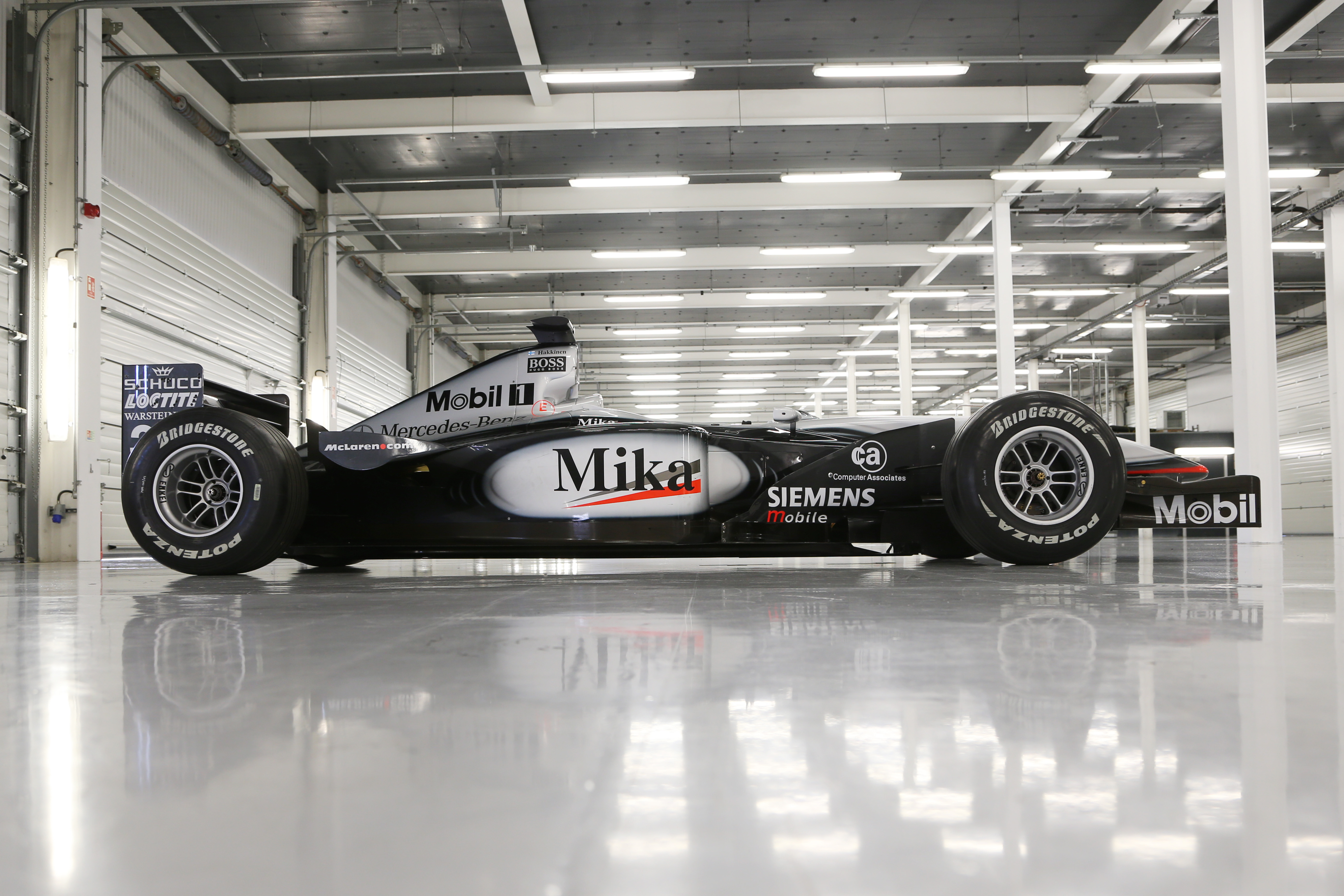
Mika Häkkinen's first name replacing the West logo

== Complete Formula One results ==
(key) (results in **bold** indicate pole position; results in italics indicate fastest lap)

Year	Team	Engine	Tyres	Drivers	1	2	3	4	5	6	7	8	9	10	11	12	13	14	15	16	17	Points	WCC
2000	McLaren	Mercedes-Benz FO110J V10	**B**		AUS	BRA	SMR	GBR	ESP	EUR	MON	CAN	FRA	AUT	GER	HUN	BEL	ITA	USA	JPN	MAL	**152**	**2nd**
2000	McLaren	Mercedes-Benz FO110J V10	**B**	(Finland) Mika Häkkinen	**Ret**	**Ret**	**2**	2	1	2	6	4	2	**1**^{1}	2	1	**1**	2	Ret	2	4	**152**	**2nd**
2000	McLaren	Mercedes-Benz FO110J V10	**B**	(United Kingdom) David Coulthard	Ret	DSQ	3	1	2	**3**	1	7	1	2	**3**	3	4	Ret	5	3	2	**152**	**2nd**

– Hakkinen's win at the Austrian Grand Prix did not count towards Constructor's Championship points standings as FIA discovered post-race that a mandatory seal was missing.
