= 2000 San Marino Grand Prix =

Coordinates: 44°20′38″N 11°43′00″E

Race 3 of 17 in the 2000 Formula One World Championship
| ← Previous race | Next race → |

Race details
- Date: 9 April 2000
- Official name: 20^{o} Gran Premio Warsteiner di San Marino
- Location: Autodromo Enzo e Dino Ferrari, Imola, Emilia-Romagna, Italy
- Course: Permanent racing facility
- Course length: 4.933 km (3.065 miles)
- Distance: 62 laps, 305.609 km (189.897 miles)
- Weather: Overcast, mild, dry; 16 °C (61 °F)
- Attendance: 100,000–120,000

Pole position
| Driver | (Finland) Mika Häkkinen | McLaren-Mercedes |
- Time: 1:24.714

Fastest lap
| Driver | (Finland) Mika Häkkinen | McLaren-Mercedes |
- Time: 1:26.523 on lap 60

Podium
| First | (Germany) Michael Schumacher | Ferrari |
| Second | (Finland) Mika Häkkinen | McLaren-Mercedes |
| Third | (United Kingdom) David Coulthard | McLaren-Mercedes |

The 2000 San Marino Grand Prix (formally the 20^{o} Gran Premio Warsteiner di San Marino) was a Formula One motor race held at the Autodromo Enzo e Dino Ferrari in Imola, Emilia-Romagna, Italy on 9 April 2000. It was the third race of the 2000 Formula One World Championship and the season's first European event. Ferrari's Michael Schumacher won the 62-lap race after starting in second. McLaren's Mika Häkkinen finished second, while teammate David Coulthard finished third.

Before the race, Schumacher led the World Drivers' Championship while Ferrari led the World Constructors' Championship. Häkkinen qualified on pole position after recording the quickest lap time in the one-hour qualifying session. He led the first 44 laps before Michael Schumacher overtook him during the second round of pit stops, through a strategy devised by Ferrari technical director Ross Brawn that allowed Schumacher to run four laps longer than Häkkinen and overtook him for the race lead. Schumacher held off Häkkinen for the final 18 laps to win his third successive race and 38th overall, by 1.1 seconds.

Schumacher's victory extended his World Drivers' Championship lead to 21 championship points over Ferrari teammate Rubens Barrichello and 22 championship points over Benetton's Giancarlo Fisichella. In the World Constructors' Championship, McLaren scored their first championship points of the season, moving into second place with 10 championship points, 29 championship points behind Ferrari with 14 races remaining.

== Background ==
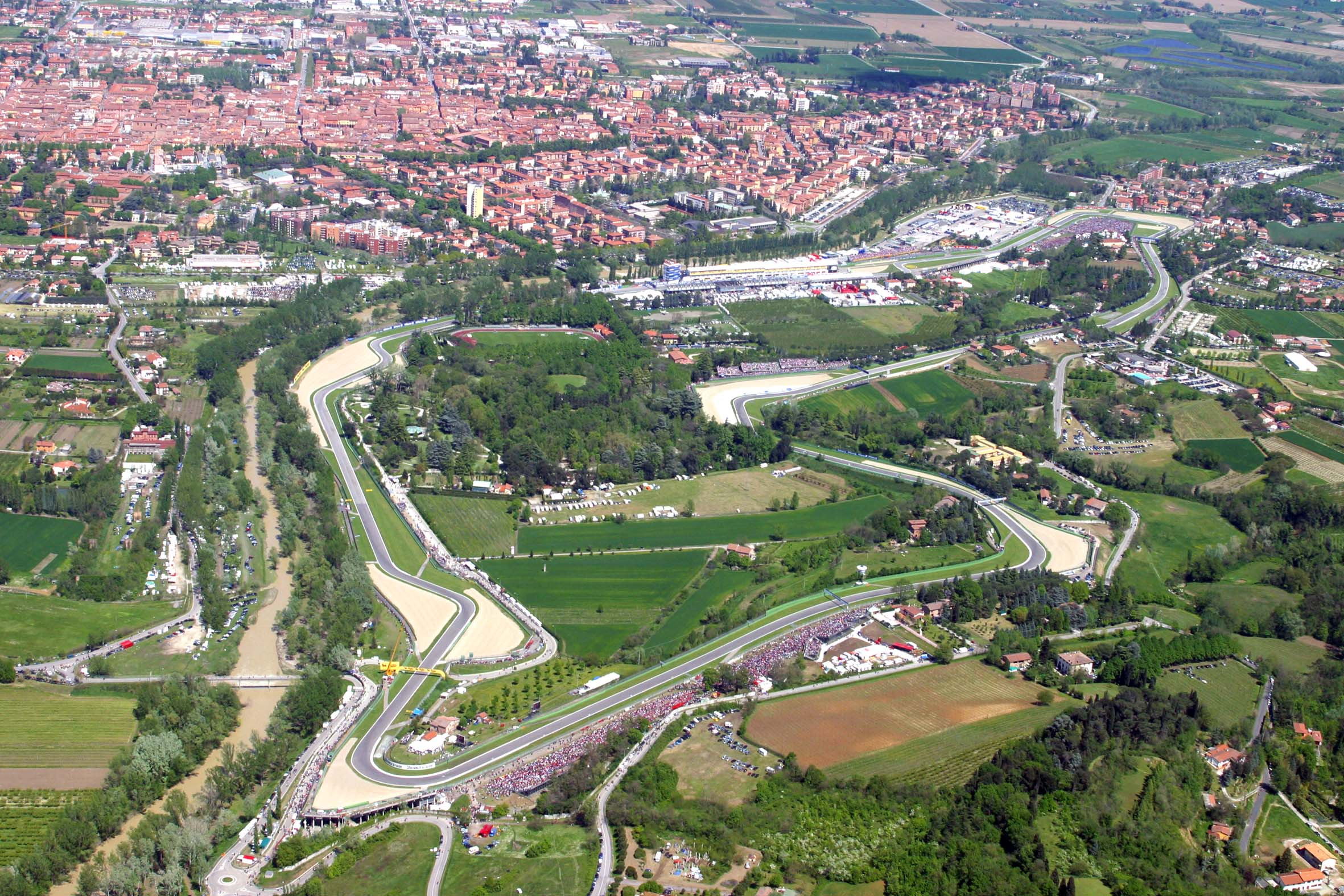
The Autodromo Enzo e Dino Ferrari (pictured in 2010), where the race was held

The 2000 San Marino Grand Prix was the event's 20th running, the third of seventeen races in the 2000 Formula One World Championship and the season's first of eleven races in Europe. (Note: The Imola circuit held a non-championship race in 1979 and the Italian Grand Prix a year later.) It was held over 62 laps on 9 April 2000 at the 17-turn, 4.933 km (3.065 mi) anti-clockwise Autodromo Enzo e Dino Ferrari in Imola, Emilia-Romagna, Italy, outside of San Marino, which lacked international standard racing tracks. The Grand Prix featured eleven teams of two drivers (each representing a different constructor), with no changes to the season entry list. Sole tyre supplier Bridgestone brought the soft and medium dry and wet-weather compound tyres to the race.

Before the race, Ferrari's Michael Schumacher led the World Drivers' Championship with 20 championship points, followed by Benetton's Giancarlo Fisichella with 8 championship points, and Schumacher's teammate Rubens Barrichello and Williams' Ralf Schumacher with 6 apiece. Ferrari led the World Constructors' Championship with 26 championship points, while Benetton was second with 8 championship points. Jordan in third and Williams in fourth had scored 7 championship points each.

Several teams tested their cars, setups and components on European racing tracks for the San Marino Grand Prix. Arrows, Benetton, British American Racing (BAR), Jaguar, Jordan, McLaren, Prost and Williams tested at the Silverstone Circuit in England in mixed weather conditions from 28 to 30 March 2000. Benetton also spent a day at Santa Pod Raceway's dragstrip, where their drivers tested a new clutch and practiced starts to determine how durable the clutch was. Ferrari's test driver, Luca Badoer, examined mechanical components on an F399 chassis for use in the F1-2000 car and performed standing starts for four days at Ferrari's private Fiorano Circuit. Michael Schumacher also spent three days testing car aerodynamics and setup on the track, before Badoer shookdown three F1-2000 cars for the Grand Prix on 6 April. The Minardi team did not test, instead focusing on chassis construction and establishing a research and development department.

Ferrari began the season with Michael Schumacher winning the first two Grands Prix in Australia and Brazil. McLaren, meanwhile, scored no points due to their unreliable car, and their driver David Coulthard was disqualified from second place in Brazil for a technical infringement. Despite the strong start to the season, Michael Schumacher said, "Twenty points from two races is ideal, but I want to ask everybody to stay quiet. The championship has only just started and it would be wrong to believe that we've won it already. It's a long season." However, improvements to his Ferrari meant he saw another victory at Imola. Coulthard felt confident in catching Ferrari and wanted to demonstrate McLaren had the fastest car, saying, "They have not won the championship yet and we are not going to give it to them. We are going to fight hard all the way. We can turn things around and that is what we are going to do." Häkkinen said that his season had started slowly but he wanted to do well at Imola.

Some teams modified their cars for the Grand Prix, focusing on braking systems to cope with the Imola circuit's demands. Ferrari used lightweight brake discs just for Saturday morning practice sessions, while Michael Schumacher drove with a new engine for qualifying only and a new rear wing specification. Sauber changed its rear wing specification following car component issues that forced the team to withdraw from the previous Brazilian Grand Prix. The Impact Protection Safety barrier system was installed along a 60 ft (18 m) section of tyre barrier outside the Rivazza turn for the race.

== Practice ==
The race was preceded by four practice sessions, two one-hour sessions on Friday and two 45-minute sessions on Saturday. Conditions were damp and overcast at the start of the first practice due to overnight rain, but the track dried and the skies cleared, allowing lap times to gradually improve. Michael Schumacher set the session's fastest time of 1:27.270, almost a second faster than the 1999 pole lap. Coulthard, Jaguar's Eddie Irvine, Häkkinen, Jordan's Heinz-Harald Frentzen, Ralf Schumacher, Fisichella, Sauber's Pedro Diniz, Arrows's Pedro de la Rosa and Barrichello completed the top ten. Several drivers reported car problems to their teams and some competitors went off the track during the session, prompting the waving of yellow flags.

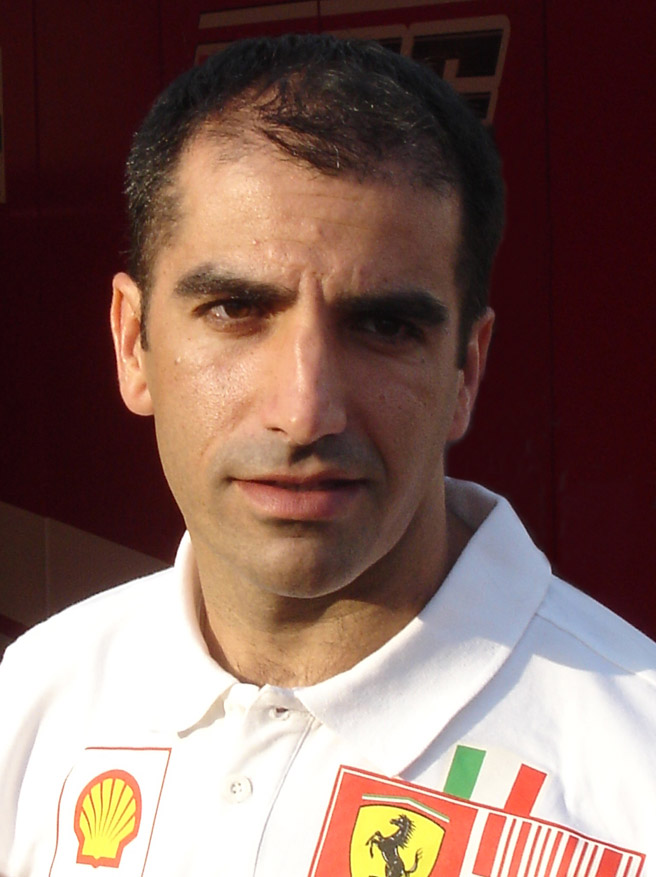
Marc Gené (pictured in 2007) had a heavy accident during the final practice session and had to drive his teammate Gastón Mazzacane's car for qualifying.

It remained dry and clear for the second practice session. Michael Schumacher set the fastest lap of the day, 1:26.944, ahead of his teammate Barrichello. The top ten included Coulthard, Jordan's Frenzen and Jarno Trulli, Häkkinen, Jaguar's Johnny Herbert, Fisichella, Ralf Schumacher, and De la Rosa. Some entrants made driver errors and ended up off the track in the gravel trap. The engine in Jacques Villeneuve's BAR car failed due to a failed fuel pipeline, dropping oil over the track that he and other drivers struggled on. Jenson Button's Williams car suffered an engine failure on the start/finish straight late in the session, and he abandoned it beside the barrier.

The first Saturday morning practice session was chilly and bright. The dry track allowed teams to finish setting up their cars for qualifying later that afternoon. Michael Schumacher led with a time of 1:25.085, followed by the McLaren duo of Häkkinen and Coulthard, Frentzen, Barrichello, Trulli, Sauber's Mika Salo, Herbert, Ralf Schumacher, and Villeneuve. Prost's Nick Heidfeld ran into the gravel trap at the Tamburello chicane but returned to the track surface. A brake problem meant Ralf Schumacher went across a gravel trap and damaged his front wing.

The final practice session took place in warmer weather. Häkkinen set the fastest time of 1:24.973, 0.112 seconds faster than Michael Schumacher, who went sideways at the Variante Alta turn. They were ahead of Coulthard, Trulli, Frentzen, Barrichello, Salo, Villeneuve, Irvine and Diniz in positions three through ten. Ralf Schumacher abandoned his car at the side of the track with a throttle butterfly mechanism fault that forced him to switch off the engine. Marc Gené heavily damaged the front of his Minardi car against the tyre wall at Piratella corner after running wide with ten minutes left. Gené was unhurt but the heavy accident required him to go to the medical centre for checks. Villeneuve changed to a new set of tyres but drove too fast and spun into the Aqua Minerale corner gravel trap, ending his session early.

== Qualifying ==
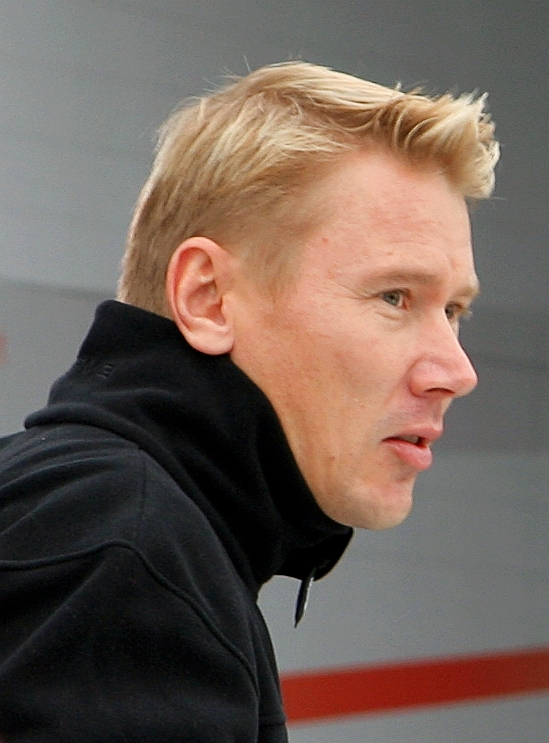
Mika Häkkinen (pictured in 2006) qualified on pole position for the 23rd time in his career.

Each driver was limited to twelve laps during Saturday's one-hour qualifying session, with the starting order determined by their fastest laps. The 107% rule was in force during this session, which required each driver to set a time within 107% of the fastest lap to qualify for the race. The session was held in bright, sunny weather, and drivers drove their cars hard, with no qualifying stoppages. Grip was low on the circuit, with cars using both soft and medium tyre compounds. Häkkinen claimed his third pole position of the season and the 24th of his career with a lap time of 1:24.714. He used soft compound tyres and a detuned engine for better reliability. Häkkinen was slower than provisional pole sitter Michael Schumacher in the first two sectors on his fastest lap set late in qualifying, and made driving errors exiting both the Variante Alta corner and the final chicane on his best lap. Michael Schumacher, who was second by 0.091 seconds, veered wide leaving the left-hand Rivazza corner after unintentionally pressing the speed limiter button into the turn on his final run, losing four-tenths of a second. Coulthard qualified third but could not lap faster due to a driver error leaving the second Rivazza turn and into the last chicane. Barrichello overcame handling troubles that caused severe understeer on his Ferrari to claim fourth. Ralf Schumacher, fifth, suffered an engine issue and pulled off the track at the exit of Piratella turn with three minutes to go while he was lapping quicker. Frentzen took sixth, followed by Irvine in seventh, who on the soft compound tyres made two driver errors and slowed for yellow flags.

Trulli, eighth, reported good car balance despite slower cars on his penultimate run and yellow flags on his final run. Villeneuve took ninth on soft compound tyres after race engineer Jock Clear improved his car's balance during qualifying, after losing four tenths of a second owing to yellow flags. Diniz, tenth, raced with greater car traction and reached sixth before other drivers lapped faster late in the session. Benetton's Alexander Wurz took 11th due to car grip issues. Salo, 12th, hit the kerbing too hard at the final chicane, exacerbating his traction troubles. De la Rosa in 13th was satisfied with his car's balance. BAR's Ricardo Zonta had a new engine in his car due to motion valve issues and lacked time to find a fast way around the circuit en route to 14th. Prost's Jean Alesi experienced gear selection issues and qualified 15th. Arrows' Jos Verstappen took 16th due to a right-rear wheel failure on his quickest run. Herbert in 17th could not extract more performance from the medium compound tyres owing to degradation, and his exhaust was broken, draining power from the engine. Button, 18th, used the medium compound tyres for the final 15 minutes. He was unacquainted with the track following hydraulic issues earlier in the day. Button forced himself to mount the kerbs. The medium compound tyres, car setup problems, a lack of traction and handing issues left Fisichella in 19th, eight positions behind teammate Wurz. Minardi's Gastón Mazzacane was the faster driver in his team in 20th. Gené in 21st, had to wait until Mazzacane finished all of his assigned laps with 15 minutes remaining before driving his teammate's car, which was altered to suit him after the third Minardi car suffered a problem on the circuit. Heidfeld completed the starting order in 22nd, driving the spare Prost AP03 car that was set up for his teammate Alesi after his race car's engine failed to start after a pit stop.

=== Qualifying classification ===
| Pos | No | Driver | Constructor | Time | Gap |
|---|---|---|---|---|---|
| 1 | 1 | (Finland) Mika Häkkinen | McLaren-Mercedes | 1:24.714 | — |
| 2 | 3 | (Germany) Michael Schumacher | Ferrari | 1:24.805 | +0.091 |
| 3 | 2 | (United Kingdom) David Coulthard | McLaren-Mercedes | 1:25.014 | +0.300 |
| 4 | 4 | (Brazil) Rubens Barrichello | Ferrari | 1:25.242 | +0.528 |
| 5 | 9 | (Germany) Ralf Schumacher | Williams-BMW | 1:25.871 | +1.157 |
| 6 | 5 | (Germany) Heinz-Harald Frentzen | Jordan-Mugen-Honda | 1:25.892 | +1.178 |
| 7 | 7 | (United Kingdom) Eddie Irvine | Jaguar-Cosworth | 1:25.929 | +1.215 |
| 8 | 6 | (Italy) Jarno Trulli | Jordan-Mugen-Honda | 1:26.002 | +1.288 |
| 9 | 22 | (Canada) Jacques Villeneuve | BAR-Honda | 1:26.124 | +1.410 |
| 10 | 16 | (Brazil) Pedro Diniz | Sauber-Petronas | 1:26.238 | +1.524 |
| 11 | 12 | (Austria) Alexander Wurz | Benetton-Playlife | 1:26.281 | +1.567 |
| 12 | 17 | (Finland) Mika Salo | Sauber-Petronas | 1:26.336 | +1.622 |
| 13 | 18 | (Spain) Pedro de la Rosa | Arrows-Supertec | 1:26.349 | +1.635 |
| 14 | 23 | (Brazil) Ricardo Zonta | BAR-Honda | 1:26.814 | +2.100 |
| 15 | 14 | (France) Jean Alesi | Prost-Peugeot | 1:26.824 | +2.110 |
| 16 | 19 | (Netherlands) Jos Verstappen | Arrows-Supertec | 1:26.845 | +2.131 |
| 17 | 8 | (United Kingdom) Johnny Herbert | Jaguar-Cosworth | 1:27.051 | +2.337 |
| 18 | 10 | (United Kingdom) Jenson Button | Williams-BMW | 1:27.135 | +2.421 |
| 19 | 11 | (Italy) Giancarlo Fisichella | Benetton-Playlife | 1:27.253 | +2.539 |
| 20 | 21 | (Argentina) Gastón Mazzacane | Minardi-Fondmetal | 1:28.161 | +3.447 |
| 21 | 20 | (Spain) Marc Gené | Minardi-Fondmetal | 1:28.333 | +3.619 |
| 22 | 15 | (Germany) Nick Heidfeld | Prost-Peugeot | 1:28.361 | +3.647 |
107% time: 1:30.644

== Warm-up ==
Sunday morning's 30-minute warm-up session took place in overcast and cool weather. As teams tested their cars and drivers reported any difficulties with them prior to the race, around one-third of participants used medium compound tyres. Häkkinen set the fastest lap at 1:27.418 late in the session, ahead of teammate Coulthard, the Ferrari duo of Michael Schumacher and Barrichello, the Jordan pair of Frentzen and Trulli, Fisichella, Gené, Irvine and Alesi. Coulthard, Gené and Mazzacane went off the track and into the gravel during the session. Halfway through warm-up, Michael Schumacher overshot his pit box and hit the mechanic holding the front jack. The mechanic was knocked down onto Schumacher's nose cone but was unhurt.

== Race ==
The Grand Prix, which began at 14:00 local time, drew between 100,000 and 120,000 spectators. (Note: Sources vary on the attendance, including 100,000, 115,000, and 120,000.) The weather conditions for the race's start were cool and overcast, with a 60% probability of rain. Heidfeld's engine stalled and he was left stranded on the starting grid during the formation lap. His team attempted to repair the problem on the grid, but he began the race from the pit lane. When the race began, Häkkinen retained his pole position advantage to lead the rest of the field into Tamburello corner. Michael Schumacher had a poor start due to excessive wheelspin in his rear tyres. He aggressively prevented Coulthard from overtaking him on the inside, leading the pack behind him to bunch up. Coulthard had to brake into Tamburello corner, and Barrichello got alongside him, taking third place on the outside. According to Autosport, Barrichello appeared hesitant to overtake his teammate Michael Schumacher, thus he slowed early into the turn, allowing Schumacher to maintain second and preventing Coulthard from passing.

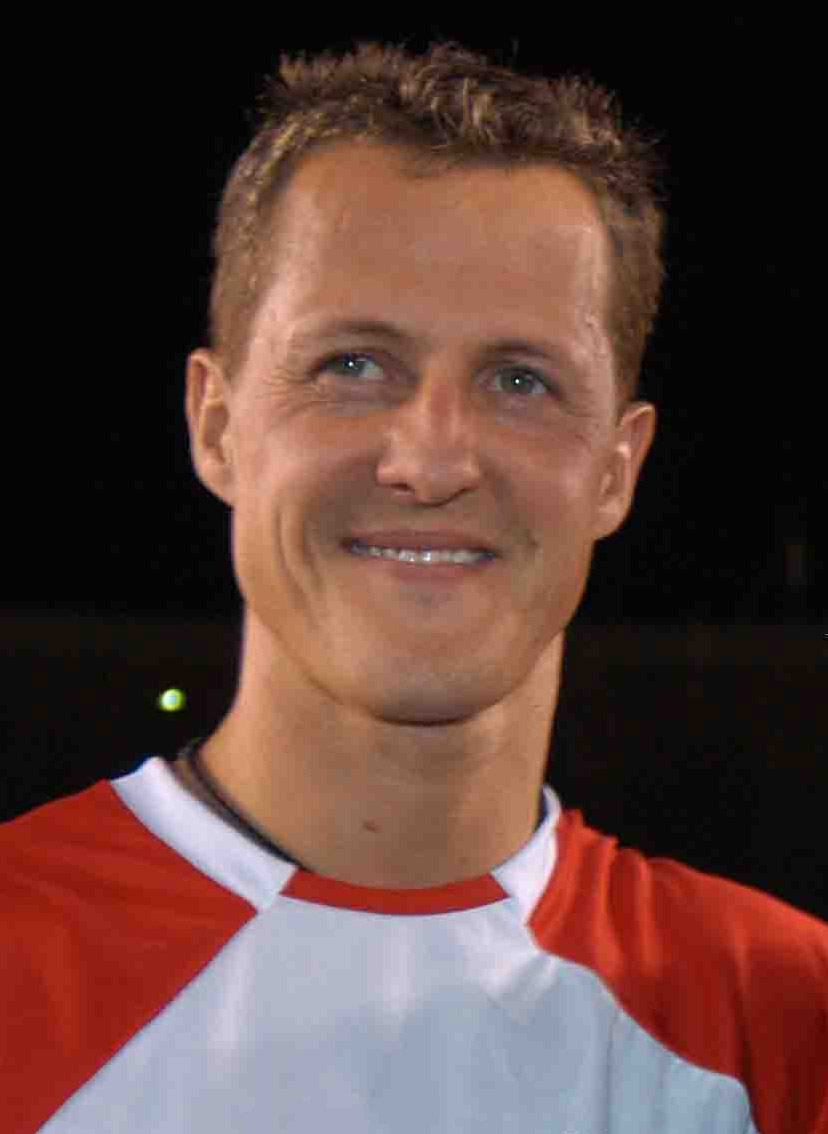
Michael Schumacher (pictured in 2005) took his third win in a row and the 38th of his career at San Marino.

Villeneuve made a quick start, passing four cars in moving from ninth to fifth place. Ralf Schumacher lost momentum after putting his left-hand tyres on the grass at the Tamburello chicane's left-hand turn to avoid hitting Coulthard due to Michael Schumacher's blocking manoeuvre. He fell from fifth to ninth. Häkkinen led Michael Schumacher by 1.2 seconds at the end of the first lap, followed by Barrichello, Coulthard, Villeneuve, and Trulli, the latter having passed Irvine and his teammate Frentzen as the field exited the Tamburello chicane and drove onto the straight between the Tamburello and Villeneuve corners. Because of the swapping of positions behind them, both Häkkinen and Michael Schumacher pulled away from the rest of the field. Mazzacane lost control of his car when braking to avoid colliding with Fisichella's slowing car at Villeneuve turn on lap three, and marshals pushed him back onto the track because he was in a dangerous place. On lap four, Frentzen's vehicle had a gearshift selection issue, preventing him from changing down from sixth gear. He entered the pit lane, becoming the Grand Prix's first retirement.

On lap six, Button's engine made odd noises and failed nearing the Villeneuve chicane, forcing him to retire in the gravel. Gené noticed Button ahead of him and drove into the gravel trap after slipping on Button's oil on the circuit. Häkkinen set a series of fastest laps to draw 3.3 seconds ahead of Michael Schumacher by lap 22, while Barrichello and Coulthard were separated by less than a second and were distanced by the former two. Meanwhile, Verstappen made an unscheduled pit stop on lap 11 to investigate a problem with his car's right-front wheel, and his pit team replaced the front wing. He returned to the circuit down the race order two laps later. On lap 21, Irvine accidentally pressed the speed limiter button and suddenly slowed out of Tosa turn while attempting to cure an engine misfire caused by an electrical fault, falling behind Ralf Schumacher and Salo as they crested a hill. Irvine continued driving at full speed without entering the pit lane. On lap 23, Verstappen served a ten second pit lane stop-and-go penalty for blocking faster cars. Diniz overtook Zonta for tenth on that lap.

Trulli was the first of the leading drivers to make a pit stop on lap 24. His 9.3-second stop moved Ralf Schumacher to sixth. Heidfeld experienced a drop in hydraulic pressure, which became so low that his car stopped running, forcing him to retire from the race at the track's side on that lap. When lap 25 ended, Coulthard made his first fuel stop, hoping to pass Barrichello by staying on the track for longer. He rejoined the track in seventh owing to a temporary gearbox trouble while in first gear. Alesi completed a full lap at a reduced speed due to a hydraulic pressure system fault before retiring in the pit lane. Both Häkkinen and Michael Schumacher made their first pit stops at the end of lap 27. Häkkinen retained the lead because he had less fuel put in his car than the latter, who was put on a longer second stint by Ferrari technical director Ross Brawn, allowing him to gain an advantage over Häkkinen during the second round of pit stops and to also create a lead over Häkkinen after his pit stop. Barrichello made his first pit stop on lap 28. His 7.7-second stop allowed him to rejoin the track behind the yet-to-stop Ralf Schumacher but ahead of Coulthard. Ralf Schumacher made his stop on lap 30 and fell behind Villeneuve as he exited the pit lane.

At the completion of the first round of pit stops for drivers making two pit stops, Häkkinen led Michael Schumacher by 4.5 seconds, with Barrichello 35 seconds behind in third and Coulthard close behind in fourth. Michael Schumacher was able to either equal his lap times from before his pit stop or be slightly slower until the fuel burned out, at which point he could lap quicker until his second set of tyres wore out. Behind the top four, Villeneuve, Ralf Schumacher, Salo, Irvine and Trulli were fifth to ninth. Diniz passed Zonta for tenth place, but he ran wide on the grass and Zonta reclaimed the position. On lap 39, Zonta succumbed to Diniz's pressure and lost control of his car at the Villeneuve chicane, spinning through the gravel trap. Zonta was able to continue driving. Häkkinen ran over metal debris on the circuit, damaging the air splitter under the car and making the front of the McLaren more difficult to drive due to reduced downforce. He was able to extend his advantage over Michael Schumacher to nearly five seconds by lap 39, until the latter began to close in.

Häkkinen led Michael Schumacher by a second by lap 41. Two laps later, at the end of the main straight and braking and turning into the Tamburello chicane, Häkkinen experienced a sudden fault with his car's electronic management computer system, which briefly shut down its Mercedes engine before the computer was reset and allowed him to continue at full speed, reducing his lead over Michael Schumacher by two seconds. On the same lap, Michael Schumacher had to brake hard to avoid hitting the rear of Diniz's car in the right-hand Acque Minerali curve when Diniz allowed Michael Schumacher to pass, losing Schumacher 1.7 seconds. Häkkinen led by 2.7 seconds when he made his second pit stop when lap 44 ended. His 8.3-second stop dropped him to second. Trulli and Irvine made their second pit stops on lap 46. Trulli passed Irvine in the pit lane because Irvine had to break to avoid a collision. Both drivers battled each other on that lap, ending in Trulli's favour. On lap 47, Ralf Schumacher was gaining on Villeneuve when he pulled off to the side of the track to retire with a fuel supply pick-up issue.

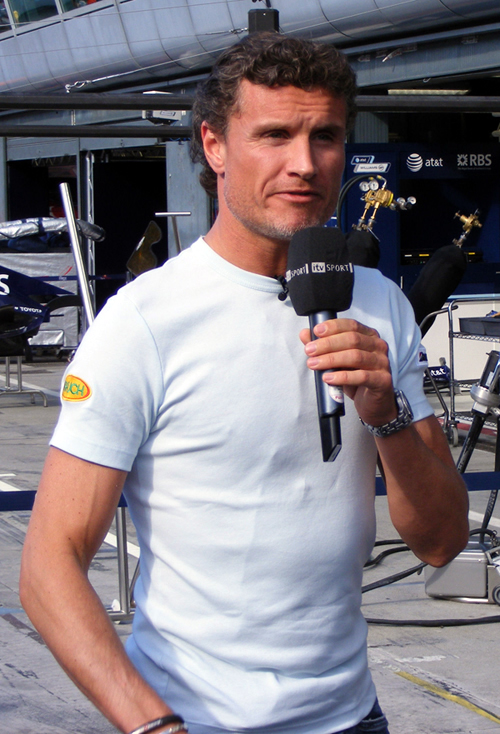
David Coulthard (pictured in 2007) finished third after overtaking Ferrari's Rubens Barrichello during the second round of pit stops.

Barrichello and Coulthard made their final pit stops on lap 47. Coulthard's stop was faster than Barrichello's due to the McLaren team's quick work, and he exited just ahead of the Ferrari driver in the pit lane after Barrichello braked heavily to avoid a collision. As he was no longer in the slipstream of another car, Coulthard began pulling away from Barrichello, whose lower part of his seat belt partly broke, causing him to shift around in his cockpit, lose pace, and suffer from pain. Michael Schumacher set a sequence of fast laps on a light fuel load to try to create a potential lead after his second pit stop for fuel and tyres on lap 48, when he was 21.6 seconds ahead of Häkkinen. The stop lasted 6.2 seconds since less fuel was needed in his Ferrari, and he returned to the track in the lead, with Häkkinen 3.7 seconds behind in second. A left-rear suspension failure sent De la Rosa off the track at Acqua Minerale corner and into the barrier on lap 52. De la Rosa was unhurt.

At the front, the gap between Häkkinen and Michael Schumacher fluctuated as they lapped slower cars ahead of them, and Häkkinen set the race's fastest lap on lap 60, a 1:26.523. Trulli went onto the grass beside the track on lap 61, becoming the Grand Prix's final retirement because he was stuck in sixth gear. Michael Schumacher held off Häkkinen in the last laps and crossed the finish line first, claiming his third win of the season and 38th overall. Häkkinen was 1.1 seconds behind in second, and his team Coulthard was 50 seconds behind in third. Barrichello finished fourth, the last driver on the same lap as the race winner. Villeneuve came fifth, holding off Salo, who scored his and Sauber's first championship point of the season in sixth despite losing time to the former when he was lapped by Michael Schumacher and Häkkinen. Irvine finished seventh after mid-race clutch troubles stopped him from improving his starting position and he accidentally pressed the speed limiter button. Diniz was eighth after overshooting his pit box and losing time at his pit stops. Wurz took ninth, experiencing car control issues over bumps. The one-stopping Herbert and Fisichella as well as Zonta (whose exhaust cracked), Mazzacane, Verstappen and Trulli (despite his retirement) were the final classified finishers.

=== Post-race ===
The top three drivers appeared on the podium to collect their trophies and later spoke to the media at a press conference. Michael Schumacher commended his team's approach for helping him win the Grand Prix, saying, "the strategy was just right. Those four laps were crucial – and we did it, for the tifosi." Häkkinen was disappointed to lose the victory through strategy, although he noted that running over debris on the track and his engine cutting out were also contributing factors, adding, "For this reason I can say that I am extremely disappointed about the work I have been able to do this weekend, and for the work the mechanics did. Until then, everybody had done the right thing." Coulthard said that he was aware he was faster than Barrichello, whom he was close behind until the second round of pit stops, and that he hoped to be called into the pit lane one or two laps after Barrichello.

The Italian press praised Ferrari for their victory. Ferrari president Luca di Montezemolo praised Michael Schumacher's work and commended Brawn for devising the race-winning strategy, "It was very tough and (Mika) Hakkinen drove very well but I am very happy with this win." He added "I know where we have been and I know what we have done and this was an emotional day for the fans, we have two great drivers and the car gave a perfect performance." Barrichello expressed dissatisfaction with himself since he felt he could have finished higher, adding, "I never really got on the pace this weekend and that is not good enough for me. For me, it has not been a good weekend. The settings of my car were never quite right and I felt everything was hard work. Ferrari team principal Jean Todt stated, "Today's race has shown it will be a long hard road but that is an incentive to work even harder. The drivers did a great job, as did the whole team."

McLaren team principal Ron Dennis stated that second and third place were not the anticipated results, but that they still had the capacity to win races in the remaining rounds and were looking forward to the following British Grand Prix. Mercedes-Benz's motorsport director Norbert Haug said McLaren's drivers had "made the best out of their situation". Haug called it "a very mature performance by the whole team", adding, "The harder times of having cars stranded with engine failures are considered as history. "We are back in business." Villeneuve commended his team's work during his first pit stop, which helped him move ahead of Ralf Schumacher and that "the race showed that we can be competitive and maybe be the best of the rest after Ferrari and McLaren." Salo stated that he was pleased to score a point for finishing sixth and that Sauber performed similarly to their performance in Australia.

The result meant Michael Schumacher continued to lead the World Drivers' Championship with a maximum of 30 championship points scored. Barrichello moved from third to second with 9 championship points. Fisichella scored no points and dropped from second to third with 8 championship points. Häkkinen was fourth with 6 championship points and Ralf Schumacher had the same number of points in fifth. Ferrari continued to lead the World Constructors' Championship with 39 championship points. McLaren scored their first championship points of the season, moving into second place with 10 points. With 14 races left in the season, Benetton (8 championship points) and Jordan and Williams (7 championship points) lost one position.

=== Race classification ===
| Pos | No | Driver | Constructor | Laps | Time/Retired | Grid | Points |
|---|---|---|---|---|---|---|---|
| 1 | 3 | (Germany) Michael Schumacher | Ferrari | 62 | 1:31:39.776 | 2 | 10 |
| 2 | 1 | (Finland) Mika Häkkinen | McLaren-Mercedes | 62 | + 1.168 | 1 | 6 |
| 3 | 2 | (United Kingdom) David Coulthard | McLaren-Mercedes | 62 | + 51.008 | 3 | 4 |
| 4 | 4 | (Brazil) Rubens Barrichello | Ferrari | 62 | + 1:29.276 | 4 | 3 |
| 5 | 22 | (Canada) Jacques Villeneuve | BAR-Honda | 61 | + 1 lap | 9 | 2 |
| 6 | 17 | (Finland) Mika Salo | Sauber-Petronas | 61 | + 1 lap | 12 | 1 |
| 7 | 7 | (United Kingdom) Eddie Irvine | Jaguar-Cosworth | 61 | + 1 lap | 7 | |
| 8 | 16 | (Brazil) Pedro Diniz | Sauber-Petronas | 61 | + 1 lap | 10 | |
| 9 | 12 | (Austria) Alexander Wurz | Benetton-Playlife | 61 | + 1 lap | 11 | |
| 10 | 8 | (United Kingdom) Johnny Herbert | Jaguar-Cosworth | 61 | + 1 lap | 17 | |
| 11 | 11 | (Italy) Giancarlo Fisichella | Benetton-Playlife | 61 | + 1 lap | 19 | |
| 12 | 23 | (Brazil) Ricardo Zonta | BAR-Honda | 61 | + 1 lap | 14 | |
| 13 | 21 | (Argentina) Gastón Mazzacane | Minardi-Fondmetal | 60 | + 2 laps | 20 | |
| 14 | 19 | (Netherlands) Jos Verstappen | Arrows-Supertec | 59 | + 3 laps | 16 | |
| 15 | 6 | (Italy) Jarno Trulli | Jordan-Mugen-Honda | 58 | Gearbox | 8 | |
| Ret | 18 | (Spain) Pedro de la Rosa | Arrows-Supertec | 49 | Spun off | 13 | |
| Ret | 9 | (Germany) Ralf Schumacher | Williams-BMW | 45 | Fuel pressure | 5 | |
| Ret | 14 | (France) Jean Alesi | Prost-Peugeot | 25 | Hydraulics | 15 | |
| Ret | 15 | (Germany) Nick Heidfeld | Prost-Peugeot | 22 | Hydraulics | 22 | |
| Ret | 10 | (United Kingdom) Jenson Button | Williams-BMW | 5 | Engine | 18 | |
| Ret | 20 | (Spain) Marc Gené | Minardi-Fondmetal | 5 | Spun off | 21 | |
| Ret | 5 | (Germany) Heinz-Harald Frentzen | Jordan-Mugen-Honda | 4 | Gearbox | 6 | |

== Championship standings after the race ==
Drivers' Championship standings

| +/– | Pos. | Driver | Points |
|---|---|---|---|
| | 1 | (Germany) Michael Schumacher | 30 |
| 1 | 2 | (Brazil) Rubens Barrichello | 9 |
| 1 | 3 | (Italy) Giancarlo Fisichella | 8 |
| 13 | 4 | (Finland) Mika Häkkinen | 6 |
| 1 | 5 | (Germany) Ralf Schumacher | 6 |

Constructors' Championship standings

| +/– | Pos. | Constructor | Points |
|---|---|---|---|
| | 1 | (Italy) Ferrari | 39 |
| 7 | 2 | (United Kingdom) McLaren-Mercedes | 10 |
| 1 | 3 | (Italy) Benetton-Playlife | 8 |
| 1 | 4 | (Republic of Ireland) Jordan-Mugen-Honda | 7 |
| 1 | 5 | (United Kingdom) Williams-BMW | 7 |
Sources:

- Note: Only the top five positions are included for both sets of standings.

== Notes ==
| Previous race: 2000 Brazilian Grand Prix | FIA Formula One World Championship; 2000 season | Next race: 2000 British Grand Prix |
| Previous race: 1999 San Marino Grand Prix | San Marino Grand Prix | Next race: 2001 San Marino Grand Prix |
