= 2000 Australian Grand Prix =

1st round of the 2000 Formula One season

Coordinates: 37°50′59″S 144°58′06″E

Race 1 of 17 in the 2000 Formula One World Championship
← Previous race	Next race →
- Albert Park Circuit

Race details
- Date: 12 March 2000
- Official name: 2000 Qantas Australian Grand Prix
- Location: Albert Park Circuit, Albert Park, Melbourne, Victoria, Australia
- Course: Temporary street circuit
- Course length: 5.303 km (3.295 miles)
- Distance: 58 laps, 307.574 km (191.118 miles)
- Weather: Sunny, Air Temp: 20 °C

Pole position
Driver	(Finland) Mika Häkkinen	McLaren-Mercedes
- Time: 1:30.556

Fastest lap
Driver	(Brazil) Rubens Barrichello	Ferrari
- Time: 1:31.481 on lap 41

Podium
First	(Germany) Michael Schumacher	Ferrari
Second	(Brazil) Rubens Barrichello	Ferrari
Third	(Germany) Ralf Schumacher	Williams-BMW

The 2000 Australian Grand Prix (officially known as the 2000 Qantas Australian Grand Prix) was a Formula One motor race held on 12 March 2000 at the Albert Park Circuit in Albert Park, Melbourne, Victoria, Australia before a crowd of 124,300. It was the first race of seventeen in the 2000 Formula One World Championship. The 58-lap race was won by Michael Schumacher for the Ferrari team after starting from third position. Schumacher's new teammate for the 2000 season, Rubens Barrichello finished second in the other Ferrari, with Ralf Schumacher third for BMW-Williams.

Mika Häkkinen started on pole position in a McLaren after setting the fastest overall lap time in the one-hour qualifying session, with teammate David Coulthard alongside him, but both retired with pneumatic valve failures. Three drivers made their Grand Prix debut: future world champion Jenson Button in a BMW-Williams, Nick Heidfeld in a Prost and Gastón Mazzacane in a Minardi. Mazzacane and Button retired from their debut race, and Heidfeld finished ninth, two laps behind. This race also marked the debut of team Jaguar Racing, who were previously known as Stewart Grand Prix.

== Background ==
The 2000 Australian Grand Prix took place at the 5.303 km (3.295 mi) Albert Park Circuit in Albert Park, Melbourne, Victoria on 12 March 2000; it was the first round of seventeen in the 2000 Formula One World Championship and the eighth staging of the World Championship Australian Grand Prix at Albert Park. Tyre supplier Bridgestone brought Extra Soft, Soft and Medium compound tyres to the race. The NASCAR Sensation, the BMW Celebrity Challenge, the Formula Ford Track Attack, the International Supersports Cup and V8 Supercars held support races during the weekend.

Heading into the first race of the season, many were tipping Ferrari driver Michael Schumacher and 1999 World Drivers' Champion, McLaren's Mika Häkkinen as the main contenders to win the 2000 World Drivers' Championship. Schumacher was favourite to win the Championship according to the bookmakers and by some former Formula One drivers, including Schumacher's teammate from the 1999 season, and new Jaguar driver Eddie Irvine. The last Drivers' Champion for Ferrari, Jody Scheckter, who did so in the 1979 season, also tipped Schumacher to win the Championship.

Out of the 11 teams and 22 drivers on the starting grid, three drivers made their debut. Nick Heidfeld joined the Prost team alongside Jean Alesi. The two replaced Prost's 1999 season line-up of Olivier Panis, who moved to McLaren as test driver and Jarno Trulli, who moved to Jordan alongside Heinz-Harald Frentzen following Damon Hill's retirement. At the Minardi team, Gastón Mazzacane replaced Luca Badoer, who opted to continue as Ferrari test driver, a role he began in 1997. The third rookie driver in the 2000 driver line-up was Jenson Button, who replaced Alessandro Zanardi at Williams. Button, at the time, became the youngest British driver ever to start a Formula One race. Many observers and fellow drivers alike had differing opinions of Williams' choice to take Button on. Sauber driver Mika Salo stated that because of Button's inexperience, he could "hurt himself or somebody else".

The main talking point going into the race was the side head protection for drivers, the design of which had been revised in the new technical regulations. Although the solutions adopted by Ferrari and Jordan during winter testing to mitigate the impact of the new configuration had caused some comment, the inspections found no irregularities on the cars of those two teams; the Arrows A21, however, was found to be non-compliant and was therefore had to raise the side guards using temporary material, pending a permanent solution for the following Brazilian Grand Prix. David Coulthard’s McLaren was also found to be non-compliant: Coulthard had requested that the sidepods be slightly filed down to allow for greater lateral movement of the head.

== Practice ==
There were four practice sessions held before the Sunday race, two one-hour sessions on Friday and two 45-minute sessions on Saturday. The first day of practice was when cars were heavy with fuel to allow drivers and engineers to fine-tune their racing setups. In the first practice session, held on a slippery track surface, Häkkinen set the fastest lap of 1:32.768, followed by Michael Schumacher, Rubens Barrichello, Coulthard, Jacques Villeneuve, Ralf Schumacher, Heinz-Harald Frentzen, Jos Verstappen, Eddie Irvine and Alexander Wurz. During the session, Ricardo Zonta and Heidfeld spun into a gravel trap beside the circuit, Johnny Herbert's car had a possible engine failure that cut out its ignition system, and Michael Schumacher's driving was curtailed due to the on-board television camera mounted atop of his Ferrari melting a wiring loom. Although he removed the left-rear wheel of his car in an sideways accident at the fast sweeping turn 14 concrete barrier on his 15th lap midway through the second practice session because he missed the braking point, Michael Schumacher recorded the day's fastest lap of 1:32.130 in clear, sunny conditions. Coulthard was second and Barrichello third. The rest of the top ten were Häkkinen, Villeneuve, Pedro Diniz, Frentzen, Wurz, Zonta and Irvine. Although Michael Schumacher's car was heavily damaged in the accident, he was unhurt.

In the third practice session, Michael Schumacher continued to run strongly with the fastest time of 1:30.439. Coulthard was 0.519 seconds behind in second place and Frentzen placed third. Fourth went to Barrichello and Trulli was fifth. Ralf Schumacher, Villeneuve, Herbert, Giancarlo Fisichella and Irvine followed in the top ten positions. Häkkinen's engine failed mid-way through his first lap, necessitating two teams of McLaren mechanics to spend 42 minutes dismantling both his and teammate's Coulthard's rear of their cars to change their engines and gearboxes to enable driving in the second practice session later that day. 15 minutes in and midway through his fourth lap, Button crashed into the turn ten right-hand side barrier at 160 mph (260 km/h) after clipping a kerb that was slippery, removing the rear wheels from his Williams and heavily damaging its bodywork. The session was halted for ten minutes as track marshals extricated his car from the circuit. Häkkinen was left with six laps to prepare for qualifying later in the day. Michael Schumacher paced the final practice session with a lap of 1:30.390, ahead of Coulthard, Frentzen (despite missing most of the session due to a gearbox sensor issue), Barrichello, Ralf Schumacher, Trulli, Pedro de la Rosa, Verstappen, Villeneuve and Herbert. Mazzacane spun his Minardi car into the grass and Häkkinen ran off the circuit at turn nine during the session.

== Qualifying ==
Saturday's afternoon qualifying session lasted for an hour. Each driver was limited to twelve laps, with the starting order decided by the drivers' fastest laps. During this session, the 107% rule was in effect, which necessitated each driver set a time within 107% of the quickest lap to qualify for the race. Qualifying was relatively routine until halfway through the session when there were a number of driver errors and a three-way duel for pole position. With a lap time of 1:30.556 set on his final run, Mika Häkkinen took the 22nd pole position of his career and his third in succession at the Australian Grand Prix by three-tenths from teammate David Coulthard, after the pair locked out a McLaren front row to start the season. Michael Schumacher ran nine laps, made multiple errors on his fast laps and was disappointed with third after a heavy spin by Coulthard across the gravel trap on his last run against the barriers at the exit to Stewart turn had damaged his McLaren and caused a red flag forcing him to abandon his final attempt. Coulthard was unhurt in the accident. He said that it "was not the intention" for him to disrupt Schumacher on his final flying lap. The top three qualifying places were identical to what they had been in the previous two years. Schumacher's new Ferrari teammate, Rubens Barrichello, qualified fourth, and was delayed on each of his runs and had a pit lane weight check. The Jordans of Heinz-Harald Frentzen and Jarno Trulli behind Barrichello qualified on the third row in fifth and sixth. Frentzen made contact with the barrier during his opening run while Trulli experienced gearbox issues on both his race car and spare car. Eddie Irvine qualified seventh for Jaguar during an incident-free session for himself, with Jacques Villeneuve eighth. Giancarlo Fisichella took ninth after making suspension damper changes and Mika Salo in 10th was pleased with how his Sauber car felt. Ralf Schumacher was 11th for the Williams-BMW, with Verstappen 13th after his right-rear suspension failed during his last run but Verstappen regained control of his car to prevent him from hitting anything. Ralf Schumacher's rookie teammate Jenson Button qualified 21st for his first race, setting a lap time 1.6 seconds slower after switching to the spare Williams car because of fuel pressure issues with his race car that was repaired following his fourth practice session accident. Behind Button was another rookie, Mazzacane, and in front was Jaguar's Johnny Herbert, who had engine failures, gear selection issues and power steering trouble that caused his Jaguar to pull to the right. Button later described his qualifying session by saying "It can't get worse than this".

=== Qualifying classification ===
Pos	No	Driver	Constructor	Time	Gap
1	1	(Finland) Mika Häkkinen	McLaren-Mercedes	1:30.556	
2	2	(United Kingdom) David Coulthard	McLaren-Mercedes	1:30.910	+0.354
3	3	(Germany) Michael Schumacher	Ferrari	1:31.075	+0.519
4	4	(Brazil) Rubens Barrichello	Ferrari	1:31.102	+0.546
5	5	(Germany) Heinz-Harald Frentzen	Jordan-Mugen-Honda	1:31.359	+0.803
6	6	(Italy) Jarno Trulli	Jordan-Mugen-Honda	1:31.504	+0.948
7	7	(United Kingdom) Eddie Irvine	Jaguar-Cosworth	1:31.514	+0.958
8	22	(Canada) Jacques Villeneuve	BAR-Honda	1:31.968	+1.412
9	11	(Italy) Giancarlo Fisichella	Benetton-Playlife	1:31.992	+1.436
10	17	(Finland) Mika Salo	Sauber-Petronas	1:32.018	+1.462
11	9	(Germany) Ralf Schumacher	Williams-BMW	1:32.220	+1.664
12	18	(Spain) Pedro de la Rosa	Arrows-Supertec	1:32.323	+1.767
13	19	(Netherlands) Jos Verstappen	Arrows-Supertec	1:32.477	+1.921
14	12	(Austria) Alexander Wurz	Benetton-Playlife	1:32.775	+2.219
15	15	(Germany) Nick Heidfeld	Prost-Peugeot	1:33.024	+2.468
16	23	(Brazil) Ricardo Zonta	BAR-Honda	1:33.117	+2.561
17	14	(France) Jean Alesi	Prost-Peugeot	1:33.197	+2.641
18	20	(Spain) Marc Gené	Minardi-Fondmetal	1:33.261	+2.705
19	16	(Brazil) Pedro Diniz	Sauber-Petronas	1:33.378	+2.822
20	8	(United Kingdom) Johnny Herbert	Jaguar-Cosworth	1:33.638	+3.082
21	10	(United Kingdom) Jenson Button	Williams-BMW	1:33.828	+3.272
22	21	(Argentina) Gastón Mazzacane	Minardi-Fondmetal	1:34.705	+4.149
107% time: 1:36.895

== Warm-up ==
In Sunday morning's half an hour warm-up session for teams to make their final preparations for the race, which took place in hot and sunny conditions, Barrichello paced the field with a lap time of 1:31.225. He was 1.573 seconds faster than Button in second place who had a small oil leak and fire in the pit lane. The two McLarens were third and fourth, with Häkkinen ahead of Coulthard. Verstappen was fifth and Fisichella sixth. Jean Alesi, Michael Schumacher, De la Rosa and Salo completed the top ten. Ralf Schumacher went off the circuit and damaged his nose cone while De la Rosa drove the spare Arrows car after his race car needed its oil tank changed. Button had an oil leak in his race car at the start of the session and switched to the spare Williams car until his race car was repaired. Herbert stopped at the pit lane entrance when his engine failed.

== Race ==
The race began in sunny weather conditions before a total of 124,300 people at 14:00 local time. A total of 21 of the 22 cars started on the grid, with Alesi the only driver to start from the pit lane due to an electro-hydraulic engine issue that forced a switch to the spare Prost car setup for his teammate Heidfeld. When the lights went out to begin the race, Häkkinen converted his pole position from qualifying to lead into the first corner at the start of the race. Coulthard and Schumacher remained in second and third place respectively, but Barrichello was overtaken by Frentzen into turn one, dropping him down to fifth place. Trulli rounded out the top six places at the end of lap 1. At the back of the field, Button gained six positions, moving from 21st to 15th position. This was partially due to a collision between Minardi driver Marc Gené and rookie Heidfeld at turn one, which left Gené last in the order as he had to pit for repairs to a bent steering arm.

Jaguar driver Johnny Herbert was the first person to retire, retiring with a slipping clutch on the second lap, having first experienced issues at turn two on the previous lap. By lap four, the two McLarens of Häkkinen and Coulthard, along with Schumacher, were already pulling away from Frentzen's Jordan, who was five seconds behind Schumacher. On lap seven, the front suspension on the Arrows car of De la Rosa failed, sending him into a tyre barrier and removing two wheels from his car. Herbert's teammate, Irvine spun trying to avoid the Arrows car. Irvine could not get the Jaguar going again as it suffered an engine failure due to an anti-stall system failure. Both retired from the race. The safety car was deployed to slow the other cars down so the marshals could clear up the wreckage.

When the green flag was given at the end of lap 10 and racing resumed between turns 15 and 16, Coulthard slowed dramatically and came in for an unscheduled pit stop with an engine misfire for the McLaren team investigate. Coulthard returned to the track, but the problem was a pneumatic valve system failure in the engine continued and forced his retirement on lap 11. Schumacher was now promoted to second, with Frentzen in third place. Barrichello was in fourth place, with Trulli fifth. Behind the top five, BAR driver Jacques Villeneuve was in sixth place, heading a queue of cars down to 12th place Button. After a new steering arm was installed in his car, Verstappen retired in the pit lane on lap 16 with defective steering. Arrows withdrew Verstappen after discussions with De la Rosa in case of a similar failure to his teammate. Häkkinen retired on lap 19, with the same problem as his teammate; a double retirement almost identical to the 1999 race. With Häkkinen's retirement, Schumacher led by 16.5 seconds from Frentzen in second. On lap 28, Alesi retired with fluid seeping from the gearbox. Schumacher made his one and only pit stop on lap 30. His stop lasted 12.2 seconds, giving Frentzen the lead. Schumacher rejoined the track in third, just in front of Trulli. Barrichello was the next driver of the front running cars to pit earlier than scheduled by Ferrari technical director Ross Brawn on lap 33, but the Ferrari team switched him to a two stop strategy so that he could move ahead of Frentzen because his Ferrari would have less fuel onboard and therefore be lighter, allowing him to lap quicker.

Trulli retired his Jordan car on lap 36 with a broken exhaust pipe that caused his engine to fail. The retirements and pit stops moved Button up the order, putting the Williams driver in third place before his pit stop on lap 36. Frentzen also made a pit stop on lap 36, but the Jordan mechanics experienced problems when the fuel nozzle became jammed while refuelling the car, costing Frentzen more than ten seconds in the stop. Frentzen rejoined the track in sixth, however retired three laps later with a hydraulic leak in the gearbox, preventing him from selecting gear correctly. Mazzacane retired on lap 41 with a gearbox problem and Diniz retired on the following lap with a similar issue. Barrichello was two seconds a lap quicker than his teammate Schumacher and set the race's fastest lap of 1:31.481 on lap 41. He took the lead on lap 45, overtaking teammate Schumacher before making his second pit stop for a quick fuel stop. As Schumacher regained the lead, Barrichello rejoined the track second.

The retirements of the McLaren and Jordan team cars elevated Ralf Schumacher, Button's Williams teammate, into third position. Villeneuve was fourth, Giancarlo Fisichella was fifth in the Benetton, with Button sixth. With 11 laps remaining Button retired from the race with smoke billowing from his car due to an engine failure. Ricardo Zonta, in a BAR, was promoted to sixth, but was overtaken by Salo on the back straight with eight laps remaining. Schumacher took his 36th career victory and won the Australian Grand Prix for the first time in ten entries after completing 58 laps in a time 1:34:01.987, twelve seconds ahead of second placed Barrichello, who completed a Ferrari one-two finish, and achieved his joint career-best finish that equalled the 1995 Canadian Grand Prix and the 1997 Monaco Grand Prix. Ralf Schumacher was classified third, with Villeneuve close behind in fourth, giving BAR their first ever points in Formula One. Fisichella finished fifth despite steering problems early in the race, with Salo initially classified as sixth in the Sauber. However, a few hours after the race, Salo was disqualified from the race for a bodywork infringement in which the front wing endplates on his car were 20 mm (0.79 in) outside the regulations, promoting Zonta into sixth place, the final points-scoring position. In an era of poor car reliability, a total of ten drivers of the 22 starters were running at the conclusion of the race, with 12 not classified.

=== Post-race ===
After the race, Michael Schumacher said:

I was driving pretty easily from the beginning, I was saving my tyres, saving my fuel, ready for the final moments when the pit stops came and I had to attack. Unfortunately the two guys in front of me broke down. I would have preferred to race them to the end, to prove how good we really are.

Barrichello was complimentary of Brawn and the rest of the Ferrari team, "He has been described as the maestro, and now I can say he really is the best. He changed my strategy, and although I don't know what happened to Frentzen, I think we would have got him anyway." Ralf Schumacher was full of praise for his Williams car and his BMW engine after finishing in third place, "It did the job, it is nice to drive, it was reliable and we finished 3rd. I thought that we would be in the points if we finished the race, but I never imagined we would be 3rd. This was a great day for us." Ferrari's sporting director Jean Todt noted it was the first one-two finish with the team's revised driver-line up of Michael Schumacher and Barrichello and that their primary opposition had not finished.

McLaren's head Ron Dennis accused Ferrari to treating Barrichello as a "sacrificial lamb" in order to protect Schumacher when the team switched Barrichello from a one-stop to a two-stop strategy, saying, "If they are trying to convince Rubens it was a super strategy, they are misleading him." Brawn's response was that it was "a bit strange making these sorts of statements" and that Dennis had no understanding of Ferrari's strategy, "I don't see how he works that out. It was worth a gamble; if we hadn't done anything, Rubens would have stayed behind Heinz-Harald Frentzen anyway." Häkkinen said although he was disappointed to not score any championship points at the opening round of the championship, it did not mean he was out of title contention as there were still "a long way to go in the season". Mercedes Motorsport boss Norbert Haug said it was a shame the McLarens retired in Australia but noted the 1999 season began the same way for the team. Sauber decided not to appeal Salo's disqualification from sixth position. Team owner Peter Sauber said that despite Salo's disqualification, the team could feel hopeful about the car's possible performance.

BAR managing director Craig Pollock heralded the team's double-points result, To get two cars in the top six is more than successful for us. Behind Ferrari we were the second team to bring both cars home which is some achievement." Villeneuve commented on his fourth-place finish, "It feels great. I knew we would be able to score points today and after the struggle of the last year, it is good to finally achieve this." He added, "This is a great start to the season and gives us something to build on." Button was praised by his teammate Ralf Schumacher, Michael Schumacher, BMW sporting director Gerhard Berger, Williams team principal Frank Williams and Williams technical director Patrick Head for his performance in Australia despite retiring. Button commented that he "had a great race" and a "great start to my F1 career" and thought he had proven his detractors wrong, "But that's not the most important thing for me. What was most important was that I proved I've got what it takes for Formula One."

As this was the first race of the season, Michael Schumacher led the World Drivers' Championship with ten championship points. Barrichello followed in second with six championship points and Ralf Schumacher had scored two fewer championship points in third. Villeneuve was fourth and Fisichella rounded out the top five. Ferrari took the lead of the World Constructors' Championship with sixteen championship points, followed by Williams and BAR with four championship points each. Benetton were the last of the eleven teams to score with two championship points with sixteen races remaining in the season.

=== Race classification ===
Pos.	No.	Driver	Constructor	Laps	Time/Retired	Grid	Points
1	3	(Germany) Michael Schumacher	Ferrari	58	1:34:01.987	3	10
2	4	(Brazil) Rubens Barrichello	Ferrari	58	+11.415	4	6
3	9	(Germany) Ralf Schumacher	Williams-BMW	58	+20.009	11	4
4	22	(Canada) Jacques Villeneuve	BAR-Honda	58	+44.447	8	3
5	11	(Italy) Giancarlo Fisichella	Benetton-Playlife	58	+45.165	9	2
6	23	(Brazil) Ricardo Zonta	BAR-Honda	58	+46.468	16	1
7	12	(Austria) Alexander Wurz	Benetton-Playlife	58	+46.915	14	
8	20	(Spain) Marc Gené	Minardi-Fondmetal	57	+1 Lap	18	
9	15	(Germany) Nick Heidfeld	Prost-Peugeot	56	+2 Laps	15	
Ret	10	(United Kingdom) Jenson Button	Williams-BMW	46	Engine	21	
Ret	16	(Brazil) Pedro Diniz	Sauber-Petronas	41	Transmission	19	
Ret	21	(Argentina) Gastón Mazzacane	Minardi-Fondmetal	40	Gearbox	22	
Ret	5	(Germany) Heinz-Harald Frentzen	Jordan-Mugen-Honda	39	Hydraulics	5	
Ret	6	(Italy) Jarno Trulli	Jordan-Mugen-Honda	35	Engine	6	
Ret	14	(France) Jean Alesi	Prost-Peugeot	27	Hydraulics	PL^{1}	
Ret	1	(Finland) Mika Häkkinen	McLaren-Mercedes	18	Engine	1	
Ret	19	(Netherlands) Jos Verstappen	Arrows-Supertec	16	Suspension	13	
Ret	2	(United Kingdom) David Coulthard	McLaren-Mercedes	11	Engine	2	
Ret	18	(Spain) Pedro de la Rosa	Arrows-Supertec	6	Suspension/Accident	12	
Ret	7	(United Kingdom) Eddie Irvine	Jaguar-Cosworth	6	Spun off	7	
Ret	8	(United Kingdom) Johnny Herbert	Jaguar-Cosworth	1	Clutch	20	
DSQ	17	(Finland) Mika Salo	Sauber-Petronas	58	Bodywork infringement (+45.624)^{2}	10	

Notes

- ^1 – Jean Alesi started the race from the pitlane.
- ^2 – Mika Salo finished sixth but was disqualified for an illegal bodywork infringement.

== Championship standings after the race ==
Drivers' Championship standings

Pos.	Driver	Points
1	(Germany) Michael Schumacher	10
2	(Brazil) Rubens Barrichello	6
3	(Germany) Ralf Schumacher	4
4	(Canada) Jacques Villeneuve	3
5	(Italy) Giancarlo Fisichella	2

Constructors' Championship standings

Pos.	Constructor	Points
1	(Italy) Ferrari	16
2	(United Kingdom) Williams-BMW	4
3	(United Kingdom) BAR-Honda	4
4	(Italy) Benetton-Playlife	2
5	(Italy) Minardi-Fondmetal	0

Note: Only the top 5 positions are shown for both sets of standings.

Previous race: 1999 Japanese Grand Prix	FIA Formula One World Championship; 2000 season	Next race: 2000 Brazilian Grand Prix
Previous race: 1999 Australian Grand Prix	Australian Grand Prix	Next race: 2001 Australian Grand Prix
