= Pneumatic valve springs =

Mechanical spring designed to close valves

Pneumatic valve springs are metal bellows filled with compressed air used as an alternative to the metal wire springs used to close valves in high-speed internal combustion engines. This system was introduced in Formula One in 1986 with the Renault EF-Type.

== Concept ==
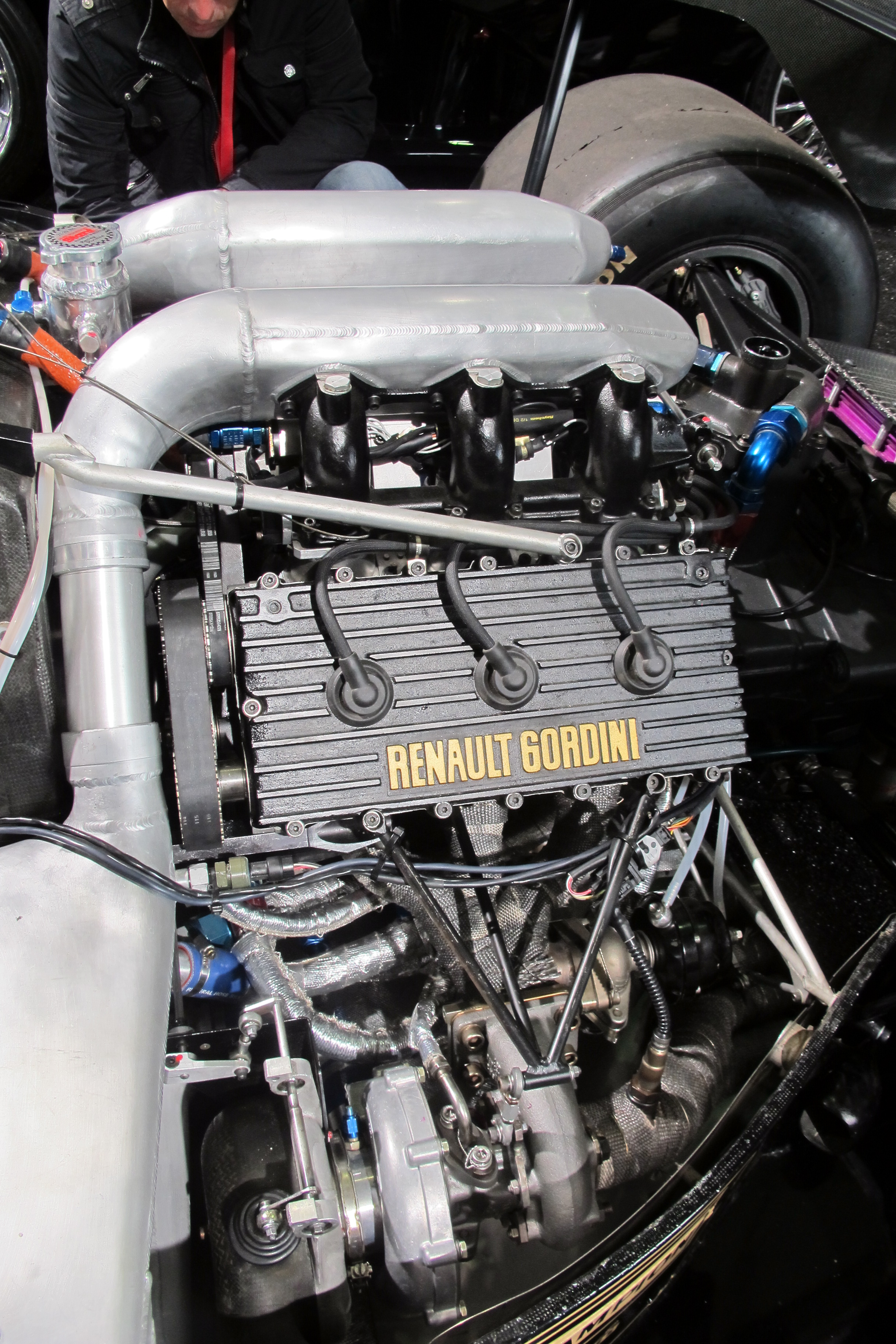
Renault-Gordini EF4 engine (1984)

Racing engines often fail at high rotational speeds because mechanical springs are unable to retract the valves quickly enough to provide clearance for the piston. Renault's pneumatic valve technology replaced steel springs with light weight compressed air bellows. These could retract valves quicker and reduce the possibility of piston-valve interference, as long as pressure could be maintained. Additionally, the amount of seat tension required to keep a coil sprung valve under control results in greater peak lift loading. This results in added stress to the entire valvetrain. Pneumatic systems sharing a common reservoir of pressure retain a more static level of force, controlling the valve effectively without any attendant peak lift load increase.

The actuation mechanism is simply a piston and cylinder, similar to a small pneumatic ram. The tappet bore where a hydraulic tappet would normally reside becomes the cylinder, and the retainer assembly becomes the piston. Pressurized air (nitrogen) is pumped into this cylinder which then causes the piston/retainer to rise to the top of cylinder, causing the valve to form an airtight seal with the seat. The compressed gas then becomes the spring, so to speak, but does not have the same traits as springs do at elevated rpm. A small light spring is sometimes fitted between the piston and retainer so that when the system is switched off the spring forces the piston down against the bottom of the bore, thus forcing the retainer upwards. This ensures that no crown-to-valve contact occurs when shut down.

== Pneumatic valve technology in racing ==
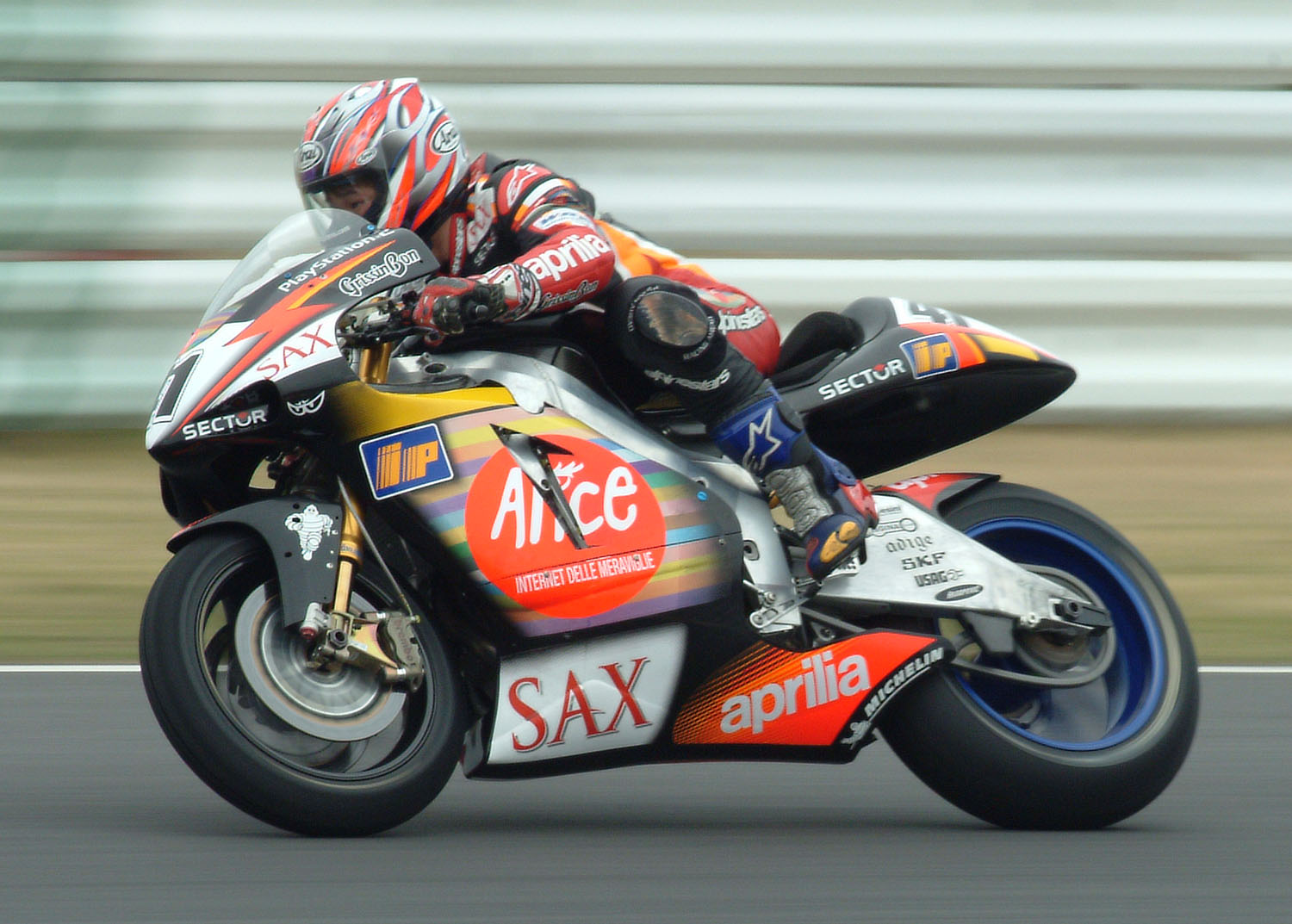
Aprilia RS Cube (2003)

Pneumatic valve springs gave Renault an advantage with its turbocharged Formula 1 engines, often said to be one of the most powerful.

The Lotus F1 team used Renault's turbocharged 1.5-litre V6 engines, equipped with pneumatic valve springs, in its 98T cars of 1986. Driven by Ayrton Senna, the chassis won two Grands Prix that season: the Spanish and Detroit Grands Prix. The engine was capable of producing peak power of around 1200bhp.

Pneumatic valve springs are also found in several Moto GP motorcycle engines, debuting in 2002 with the Aprilia RS Cube. In 2005, Team Roberts was the first to use pneumatic valves full-time in their uncompetitive KTM powered bike. Today, almost all of the MotoGP teams use pneumatic valve technology on their bikes, including Yamaha, Suzuki and Honda. Ducati uses a desmodromic design.

== See also ==
- 4-stroke cycle engine valves
- Helical camshaft
