= Run-off area =

Area on a race track used for racer safety

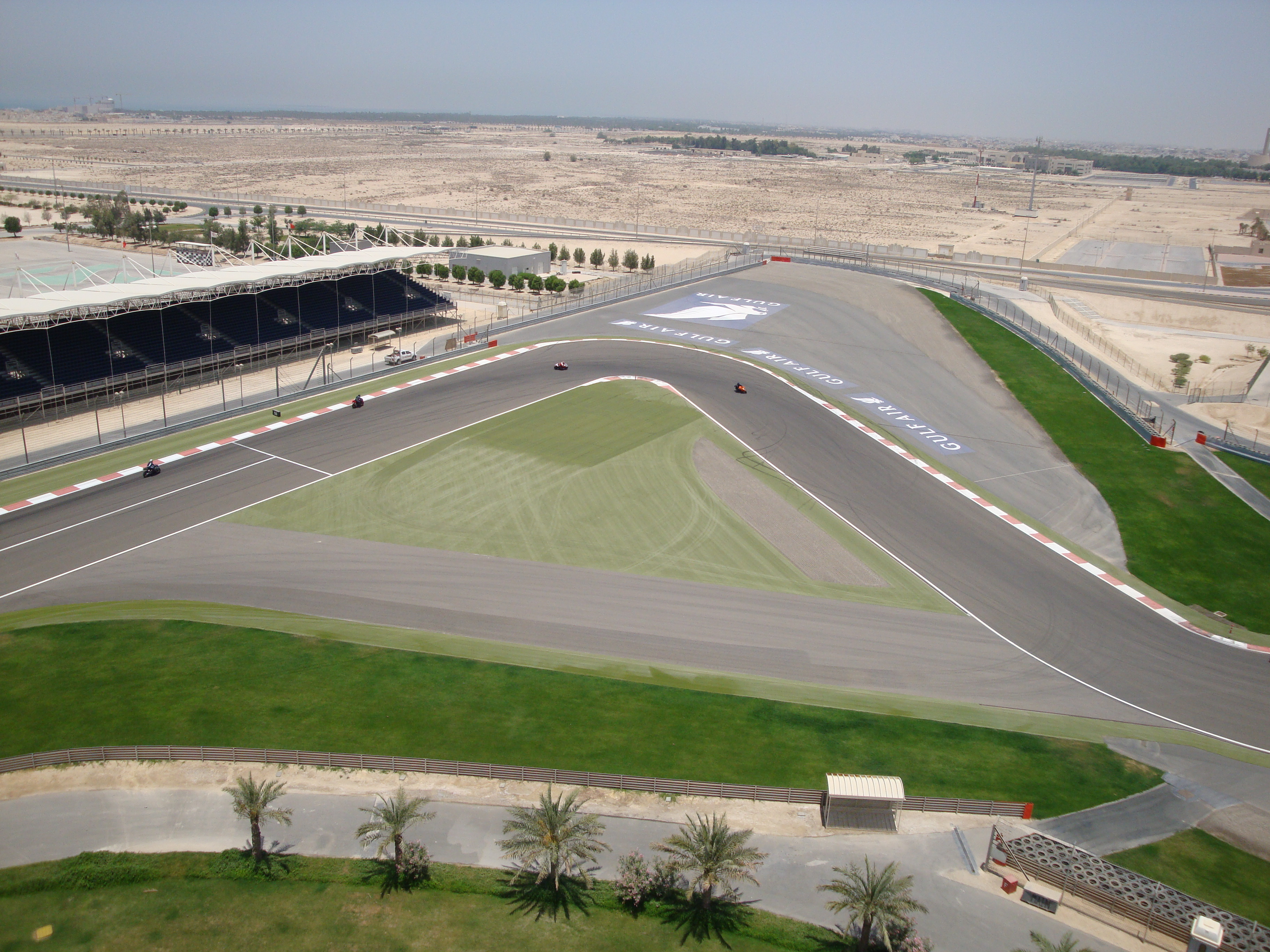
A modern racetrack like the Bahrain International Circuit has large run-off areas.

A run-off area is an area on a motorsport race track used for racer safety. Run-off areas are usually located along a road racing circuit where racers are most likely to unintentionally depart from the prescribed course. There are different types of run off areas, like gravel trap, AstroTurf, and tarmac. Run-off areas are an alternative to catch fences.

== Definition ==
In motorsports racing, there is a concept called the racing line. This is defined in lay terms as the optimal path around a race course that allows a driver to complete a lap in the shortest possible time. The racing line is a function of the track's layout and the capabilities of a particular type of racing vehicle (such as a car or a motorcycle), and the physics of motor racing.

Because the physics involved in a motorsports event generally propel the racing vehicles along a certain path, and since racers generally manage the forces acting on their vehicles through controlled steering, braking, and acceleration while not suddenly confronting the forces in play on the vehicle, their likely trajectories and potential departure points can be estimated.. As a result, in areas where a vehicle is more likely to depart the course (e.g., around the outside of a corner as opposed to alongside a straight-away), course designers will place a run-off area.

== Design ==
Race tracks have evolved over the years, as have motorsports in general, and through the concerted efforts of certain racers and supporting organizations, safety has become a top priority amongst race organizing constituents such as sanctioning leagues, sponsors, tracks, and team owners. Prior to safety being brought to the forefront of the racing world's consciousness, it was often an afterthought and many racers were injured or lost their lives due to accidents that were preventable.

One such example is when World Champion motorcycle racer Wayne Rainey crashed in the 1993 Italian motorcycle Grand Prix at Misano World Circuit that would eventually leave him paralyzed from the chest down. In that particular accident he rode slightly too aggressively into a turn and crashed. As he slid into the run-off area's gravel trap, he suffered a broken back. In that particular case the gravel trap had been raked in an effort to more quickly dissipate the kinetic energy of off-course cars. The change was unfortunately left in place for the motorcycle race in which Rainey suffered his back injury.

Another example is the introduction of the air fence. The air fence performs similarly to the air bag in a commercial passenger vehicle, except that rather than inflating upon impact, it is pre-inflated. By acting as a soft, energy-absorbing barrier, air fences can be placed over hard obstacles around tracks that racers might encounter in the course of an accident. With an air fence in place, the racer has a much better chance of sustaining fewer injuries than if he were to simply hit the object without any buffer. Air fences are especially important (and more widely used) in motorcycle road racing.

Run-off areas are an important safety feature of modern motorsports parks and road courses. They are the basis for several other safety features, such as gravel traps and air fences, which could not be placed anywhere, or would be ineffective without a proper run-off area.

== Importance in the perception of a motorsports park's standards ==
When being interviewed about race tracks and what features they like and dislike, many top professional racers will mention the availability, design, and size of the run-off areas of a certain track. Racers have stated that the feeling of being safe provides added peace of mind and allows them to push the limits further, since they have less fear of the consequences of making a mistake.

In short, other than personal safety equipment or the safety features of the race vehicle itself, the most important safety feature of a race track is the quantity, size, quality, maintenance, race-type specific configuration and overall design of its run-off areas.

== Economics of track safety ==
In modern racing leagues, if a track does not have adequate safety preparations including proper run-off areas, racers will often threaten to boycott any events that visit that particular track. In actuality, the racing leagues in question have safety standards to which they hold tracks when selecting them; therefore, if the athletes have an issue with a track it is usually because there is some problem that is either beyond the scope of the rules, or that they interpret them differently from the league. In order to prevent such a strike and to make themselves as attractive as possible to various racing sanctioning bodies in the hopes of attracting lucrative professional racing events to their facilities, park managements will often pay substantial attention to such facilities' features as safety devices, including run-off areas, and make substantial financial investments to add or improve such devices as deemed necessary. They will even go so far as to advertise safety as having been a central design tenet during the track's general construction or renovation. By making the facility as attractive as possible to racers, the hope is that the racers will put pressure on the leagues in which they participate to race at that venue. The other theory is that by making the venue as up-to-date, luxurious, safe, and feature-rich as possible, that various racing leagues will want to hold events there and thus, not only will the park make revenues from gate fees, but they will also make more money from sponsorship deals for selling advertising space on track property (such as walls around the course, bridges, infield grass painting, etc.). Such advertising will be seen by many potential consumers, since the more popular racing leagues have more television viewers, so the rates that the facility can charge to advertisers will be higher than if the track received less television air-time, or air-time with lower ratings. Therefore, making safety improvements makes financial sense to a track's management, since it leads to greater demand from event promoters and even larger and more popular events, which in turn increase a track's gate revenues, advertising revenues, and revenues from club racers and other users of the track while major events are not being held since the popularity of a track corresponds to its usage by non-professionals engaging in hobby pursuits. If top racers do not feel that a track is safe they may put pressure on their racing league to not schedule events at that particular venue. Or, if a league has documented safety standards for the tracks on their circuit, they may choose not to schedule events at a deficient facility until it has made the requisite changes.

Until racers became actively involved with promoting race track safety, there was no market pressure on the tracks to make such improvements. Now that safety measures are an integral part of the demand equation (with the racing leagues being the consumers and the tracks being the suppliers), tracks must be competitive in terms of their safety facilities in order to be competitive in luring events from the most popular racing leagues.

Because run-off areas and their associated safety devices (i.e. gravel traps, air fences, tire walls, etc.) are a primary safety feature of tracks, they hold enormous economic sway over the track, a consideration that is not lost on designers of new tracks and existing tracks' renovation projects.
