= Eric Broadley =

British engineer and car designer (1928–2017)

Eric Broadley MBE
- Born: Eric Harrison Broadley; 22 September 1928; Bromley, England
- Died: 28 May 2017 (aged 88); Cambridge, England
- Occupations: Race car designer, entrepreneur

Eric Harrison Broadley MBE (22 September 1928 – 28 May 2017) was a British entrepreneur, engineer, and founder and chief designer of Lola Cars, the motor racing manufacturer and engineering company. He was arguably one of the most influential automobile designers of the post-war period, and over the years Lola was involved with many high-profile projects in Formula One, Indy car, and sports car racing. Broadley sold Lola to Martin Birrane in 1997.

== Biography ==
=== Early years ===
Eric Broadley was indentured to a building company as a young man in the late 1940s, and after completing his studies took a job as a quantity surveyor. In his spare time Broadley was heavily involved in motor racing with the 750 Motor Club. In common with the majority of other competitors – including Colin Chapman, Frank Costin and Brian Hart – he built his own cars around Austin 7 chassis, using home-made and proprietary parts. His first car, the Broadley Special) was built in 1956 to comply with rules governing the "Ford Ten Special" (or "1172 Special") class, using an 1172cc (72ci) side valve engine, originally introduced for the pre-war Ford Model C.

The Broadley Special was an instant success, winning a number of local and national events in the UK. On the back of this record Broadley, at the request of a number of drivers seeking something besides a Lotus XI, immediately began to design a chassis to accept a more powerful 1098cc (67ci) Coventry Climax engine and BMC A-series gearbox. This car, with its up-to-the-minute space frame chassis, was to become the Lola Mk1, named after the song "Whatever Lola Wants" from the contemporary musical Damn Yankees. Although, as Broadley freely admits, the Mk1 was too powerful for his level of driving skill , in 1958 he became the first man ever to lap the Brands Hatch Indy circuit in under one minute. Once it was sorted it beat the Lotus XIs "with monotonous regularity" (notably in the hands of Peter Ashdown, who racked up at least a score of wins, including a class win and sixth overall at the 1959 Tourist Trophy). The success soon attracted the interest of other privateers, so Broadley and his cousin were prevailed upon in 1958 to build three further copies. Lola Cars Ltd. was born.

Staying largely at Bromley, Broadley set up shop in West Byfleet, Surrey, using £2000 of his own savings, producing thirty-five more Mk1s through 1962, all with the Coventry-Climax. with ever-improving results on the track. Despite its limited experience, in 1960 Lola produced its first single-seat open-wheeled model: the Mark 2, for Formula Junior. Performance was promising rather than outstanding, and its front engine was a mistake, as the formula was soon to become dominated by rear and mid-engined cars. Despite these drawbacks, and only scoring one win in the 1960 season, forty-two examples were sold. Redesigned for 1961, the mid-engined Mk3 consistently finished behind contemporary Lotuses and Coopers.

=== 1960s and 1970s: Formula One and international fame ===
On the back of his initial success, and despite his inexperience (and the failure of the Mark 2), in 1961 Broadley was approached by Reg Parnell to design and build a Formula One chassis for his Bowmaker-Yeoman Racing Team. The Lola Mk4 featured the usual tubular spaceframe, with an innovative front suspension using lower wishbones and upper transverse links with radius arms, while the rear had upper and lower transverse links and radius arm; Broadley's idea continued to be used into the 1970s. The Mark 4 originally used the common Coventry-Climax four, while a 1.5-litre (91ci) V8 later became available. Though John Surtees and Roy Salvadori proved quick in them, and a one was put on the pole in its first ever race, the 1962 Dutch Grand Prix, by Surtees, the car failed to finish. Surtees went on to win the 2000 Guineas at Mallory Park, and placed second at the British and German Grands Prix.

Bowmaker-Yeoman got out of Grand Prix at the end of 1962, selling their Mark 4s to the Tasman Racing Series; in Australasia, Surtees and teammate Tony Maggs did quite well, with Surtees winning the New Zealand Grand Prix (not a World Championship event). For 1963, Parnell sold one to Bob Anderson and ran another for Chris Amon, who was rarely successful, though he ran seventh in the British Grand Prix; Anderson did better, winning the (non-championship) Rome Grand Prix as a privateer.

Efforts on a Formula Junior car, Mark 5, through 1962 led to nine sales but only limited success; an improved Mark 5A gave Richard Attwood a win in the Monaco Grand Prix Junior event.

The 1963 Racing Car Show debuted the sensational Mark 6 (Lola GT), a trendsetter into the '70s. It featured a Ford 4.2-litre (255ci) V8 and Colotti four-speed box under a sleek fiberglass body, showing good handling and "a remarkable turn of speed" for only 250 hp (186 kW), enough to put it in the running for the 1963 Vingt-Quatre Heurs du Mans until the gearbox balked and David Hobbs crashed.

This performance attracted the attention of Ford, who were looking for a way to win Le Mans, and offered Broadley a two-year deal to redesign the GT, setting up Ford Advanced Vehicles, in a factory on the Slough Trading Estate; it produced the GT-40, which differed in many respects from the Mark 6, not least in using a steel chassis rather than the aluminium of the Mark 6. This was one of many points at which Broadley found himself at odds with his American employers.

Broadley, used to being his own boss, quit after 12 months, and as the FAV factory was in the name of Lola Cars, retained the plant forcing Ford to move to a different factory on the estate. The first cars from the newly independent company were the new Mark 5As for Midland Racing Partnership (as used by Attwood), now redesignated Mark 53. The derivative Mark 54 Formula Two single-seater, also used by Midlands, gave Attwood seconds at Pau, Albi, and the Nürburgring, while Maggs came second at Aintree. A monocoque single-seater for F2 and F3, the T60, was introduced in 1965; five were built, but were not a success, and the development models, T61 and T62, bought by Midlands and six other customers, were no better. The other 1965 debut, the T70, was just the opposite, "destined to become one of the most successful and long lived of sports cars". Offered with 5.4 or 6.2-litre (327ci or 377ci) Chevrolet and Hewland four-speed or ZF five-speed, and patterned on the Mark 6 and GT-40, it was nevertheless fresh, and was almost as big a revelation as its older sibling. FIA created Group 9 (later Group 7) just for the T70, while Surtees drove one in British races, including a Guards Trophy victory at Brands Hatch in a works car. Fifteen were sold in 1965, as well as thirty-two of the improved Mk2, introduced in 1966.

In his first venture at Indianapolis, Broadley's Type 80, with the 4.2-litre Ford, were unsuccessful. For 1966, team owner John Mecom ordered three improved T90s for Jackie Stewart, Graham Hill, and Rodger Ward; Stewart's fell out in the lead on Lap 190, giving Hill the win. A heavily modified T90 would put Al Unser in second in 1967.

Improving the T70 in 1967, Broadley came up against the McLaren juggernaut in Can-Am and scored only one win, Surtees' at Las Vegas. To qualify for European prototype racing, Broadley designed a coupé body for the heavy, unreliable Aston Martin twin cam engine. This led to retirements at the Ring and Le Mans, so Surtees switched to the reliable 5.7-litre (350ci) Chevrolet, revealing fragility in the suspension. Even so, Hawkins/Epstein took the Spa 1000km and Hawkins/Love second at the Kyalami Nine Hours in privateers. Finally homologated as a Group 4 coupé with Chevy engine in 1968, and despite poor performance in the World Championship due to lack of works support, it sold over one hundred copies to privateers. Prime among them was Denny Hulme, winning the Tourist Trophy that year, for starters. Developed as the Mk3B (officially T76) in 1969, with new bodywork and lighter weight, it went to private buyers such as Frank Gardner, Trevor Taylor, Paul Hawkins, and Mike de Udy, who picked up wins in SCCA events during 1969–70, as well as its first World Championship sports car race, in the hands of Mark Donohue and Chuck Parsons at the 24 Hours of Daytona (a one-two Lola finish), plus second by Jo Bonnier and Herbert Muller at the Austrian 1000km, giving Lola third in the championship.

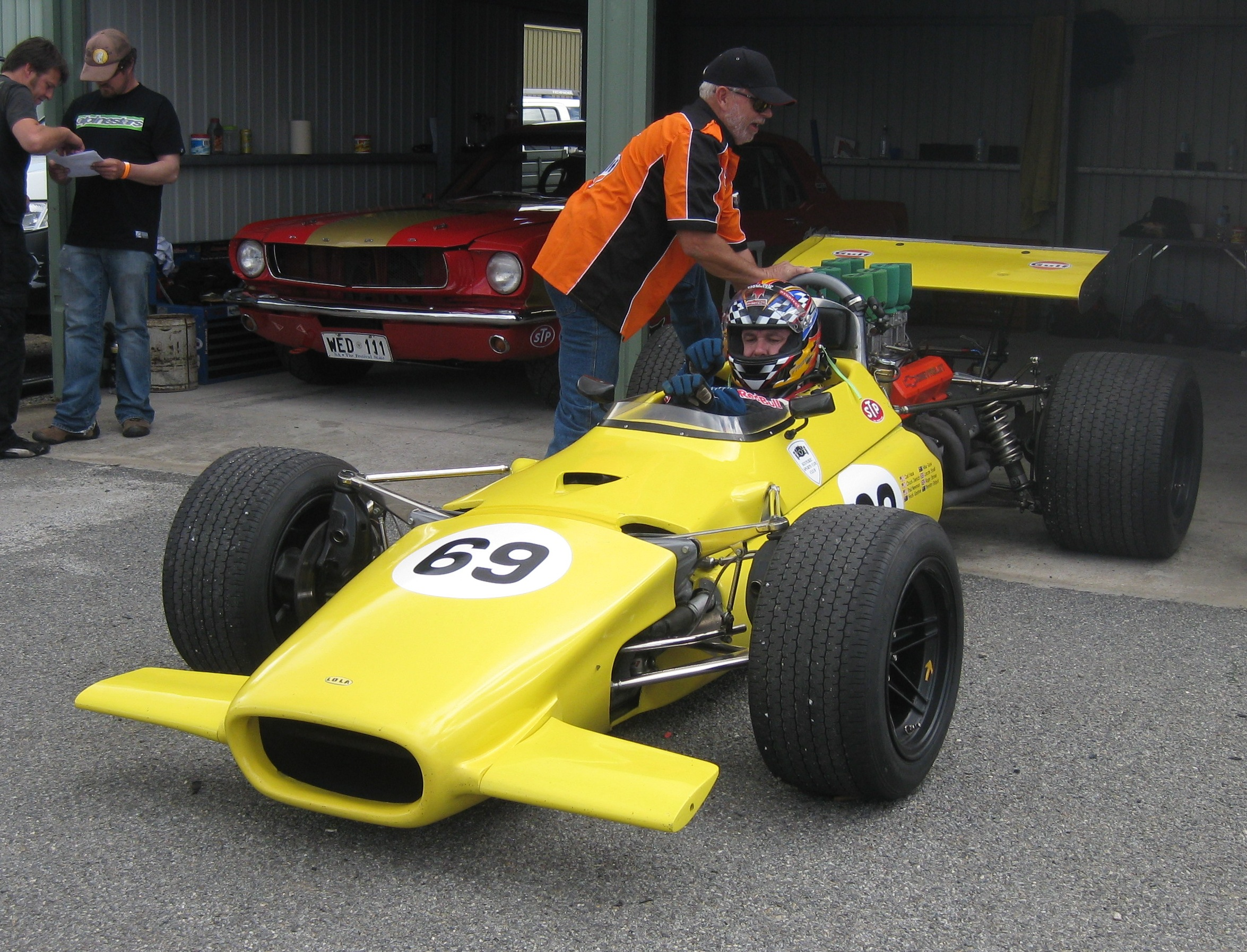
Lola T142 Formula 5000

Nor did Broadley neglect single-seaters. In 1967, he created an all-new monocoque, the F2 T100, only to waste considerable effort and money on the problematic BMW radial-valve engine; after a switch to the Cosworth FVA, it was a competitor, giving Surtees wins at Zolder and Mallory Park and second at Reims. It would later be revised as the T102 and supplied to BMW. The same year, Broadley's new Formula One T110, jointly with Surtees, was abandoned. The chassis for Honda's F1 car, also in 1967, came out a touch overweight, but light enough to win the Italian Grand Prix. Making use of the American 5-litre stock blocks and T70 suspension for Formula A, Broadley built the spaceframe T140 once-seater; it became T142 for the British equivalent, Formula 5000.

In 1968, Broadley returned to Indianapolis with the T150, suitable for either two- or four-wheel-drive; four-wheel-drive proved preferable, but even the greater traction could not prevent Unser from crashing. He also prepared the T160, to replace the outclassed T70, for Can-Am, providing several to American privateers, while Surtees, who planned to run a Chevy-powered Weslake-prepared car, broke with Lola and was uncompetitive.

For 1969, Broadley's T162 Can-Am car was run over by the dominant McLarens, and only seven were built. The subsequent T163 was little better, though Parsons earned one second and two-thirds. Additionally, the new T190 FA/F5000 car had a monocoque, more advanced than the T142, but a handful to drive. Partly in response, Frank Gardner was brought on board, perfecting the T190 so it was competitive, scoring wins at Thruxton and Silverstone, and getting Broadley's attention. Broadley stretched it further, into the T192, and asked Gardner to oversee development testing from then on.

Offerings in Formula Two, Formula Three, Formula Ford, Formula Vee, Formula Super Vee, Formula Atlantic, and Can-Am kept Broadley very busy in the '70s. By 1972, Lola were virtually alone in providing customer cars. They were as quick as ever, as the T280 (built by request of Jo Bonnier) demonstrated, but they were still hampered by the absence of a dedicated development team, despite Gardner's presence. For all that, and for all the "bewildering variety", few Lolas were real failures.

=== 1980s and 1990s: Haas-Lola, customer teams in F1, failed Mastercard-sponsored works team and sale of Lola Cars ===
Broadley had very minor involvement in the Haas-Lola Formula One project which spanned the 1985 and 1986 Formula One seasons being named as chief engineer in 1985. Amusingly, the THL1 and THL2 chassis (designed by Neil Oatley and a young Ross Brawn) used by Haas-Lola were referred to as 'Lolas' and sometimes included amongst Lola Grand Prix results even though Lola Cars were not officially involved in the Haas-Lola project because team owner Carl Haas had a close association with Broadley, who was appointed chief engineer for the team. Later, during the late 1980s to early 1990s after years of providing chassis to customer teams, such as Larrousse from 1987 to 1992( with whom Broadley and Lola had notably achieved a podium finish with courtesy of Aguri Suzuki finishing third at the 1990 Japanese Grand Prix using a LC90 chassis designed by Broadley and Chris Murphy), and BMS Scuderia Italia, (who raced the uncompetitive Broadley-designed T93/30 chassis in 1993), (Note: The Embassy Hill team which competed during the 1970s in Formula One with Lola designed chassis, however these cars were designed by Andy Smallman rather than Broadley.) Broadley planned a team that would compete solely under Lola ownership. A prototype chassis named the T95/30 was first tested in late-1994 and early 1995 by Allan McNish and in late 1996 Broadley announced the team's participation in the near future. The team had originally intended to enter F1 in 1998, but entered a year early in 1997, Broadley saying that this was due to commercial pressures from the team's sponsors, primarily from title sponsor, MasterCard. This was due to MasterCard's ardour to launch its "F1 Club" for card holders to provide funding to Lola. Broadley had also planned for Lola to become both a chassis and engine constructor like Ferrari with this entry. The design of this proposed Lola in-house V10 engine was to be overseen by Al Melling, with the engine intended to be designed specifically to take into account the rear streamlining of the car and the underneath of the car in the area of the diffuser. However, the engine was not developed in time and Lola were compelled to use the Ford ECA Zetec-R V8 engine, the same specification V8 as used by the defunct Forti team in the 1996 season. During pre-season in early-February 1997 before Lola had launched even launched their 1997 car Broadley declared that Lola in their first season as a team should be looking to beat another team that was also newly entered into Formula One for 1997-Stewart Grand Prix. Broadley also cited the Arrows team who would also use Bridgestone tyres in 1997 like Lola (along with Prost, Minardi and Stewart) and had signed 1996 champion Damon Hill as another team Lola could benchmark itself against during its debut season. The car which Lola had created to enter the 1997 Formula One World Championship - the T97/30 - designed by Broadley and Chris Saunders was launched on 20 February 1997 at the Hilton Hotel, London, England. At this launch, Broadley stated it was the longer-term aim of him team to win the World Championship within four years.

Vincenzo Sospiri, an International Formula 3000 champion and Formula One test driver, and Ricardo Rosset were signed to drive for Lola. However, by the time T97/30 car made it to the 1997 Australian Grand Prix, Broadley's launch target of aiming to beat the Ford-backed Stewart team was proven to have been far too optimistic and the team's failings were laid bare, with the Lola cars bottom of the qualifying timesheets by a considerable margin. To add further insult to injury for Broadley and Lola the Formula One qualifying rules used between 1996 and 2002 stated drivers would only be allowed to start a race if they set a qualifying time within 107% of the pole position time or if under exceptional circumstances, so with Sospiri and Rosset qualifying more than 11 and 12 seconds respectively off the pace of polesitter Jacques Villeneuve in his Renault V10-powered Williams FW19 the Lola cars therefore did not qualify for the Melbourne race in accordance with this rule. By contrast both of the cars run by the other new 1997 entrant, Stewart Grand Prix comfortably qualified for the same race. The cars were tested at Silverstone shortly after the Australian Grand Prix but both were again slowest with times in excess of 9 seconds off the front runners. On 26 March 1997, the Wednesday before the Brazilian Grand Prix, Lola announced it was withdrawing from the Brazil race due to "financial and technical problems". Lola's staff, who had already travelled to Interlagos, returned to the team's base in Huntingdon, England. Shortly afterwards, Lola withdrew from the World Championship outright thus ending Broadley's dream of a successful full works Lola F1 team. The disastrous F1 effort caused Lola Cars to enter administration in 1997, with the company sold the same year to businessman Martin Birrane, who owned the company until it closed in 2012. Broadley admitted in a 2008 feature for Motor Sport that the F1 project was a disaster and he only decided to enter the sport as a works team due to Broadley's separate composites business struggling to get off the ground as well as his declining health and heart bypass surgery right before the F1 project which Broadley stated meant he "didn't have the energy" to address the problems of the T97/30.

== Death ==
He died on 28 May 2017, at Cambridge, aged 88.

== Notes ==
=== Bibliography ===
- "People: Eric Broadley". GrandPrix.com.
- "Lola: The Story". LolaHeritage.co.uk. Archived from the original on 28 February 2008.
- Twite, Mike, "Lola: A prolific racing builder", in Northey, Tom, ed. World of Automobiles (London: Orbis, 1974), Volume 11, p. 1213-8.
- Williams, Richard (1 June 2017). "Eric Broadley obituary". The Guardian.
