= Sauber C16 =

Formula One racing car

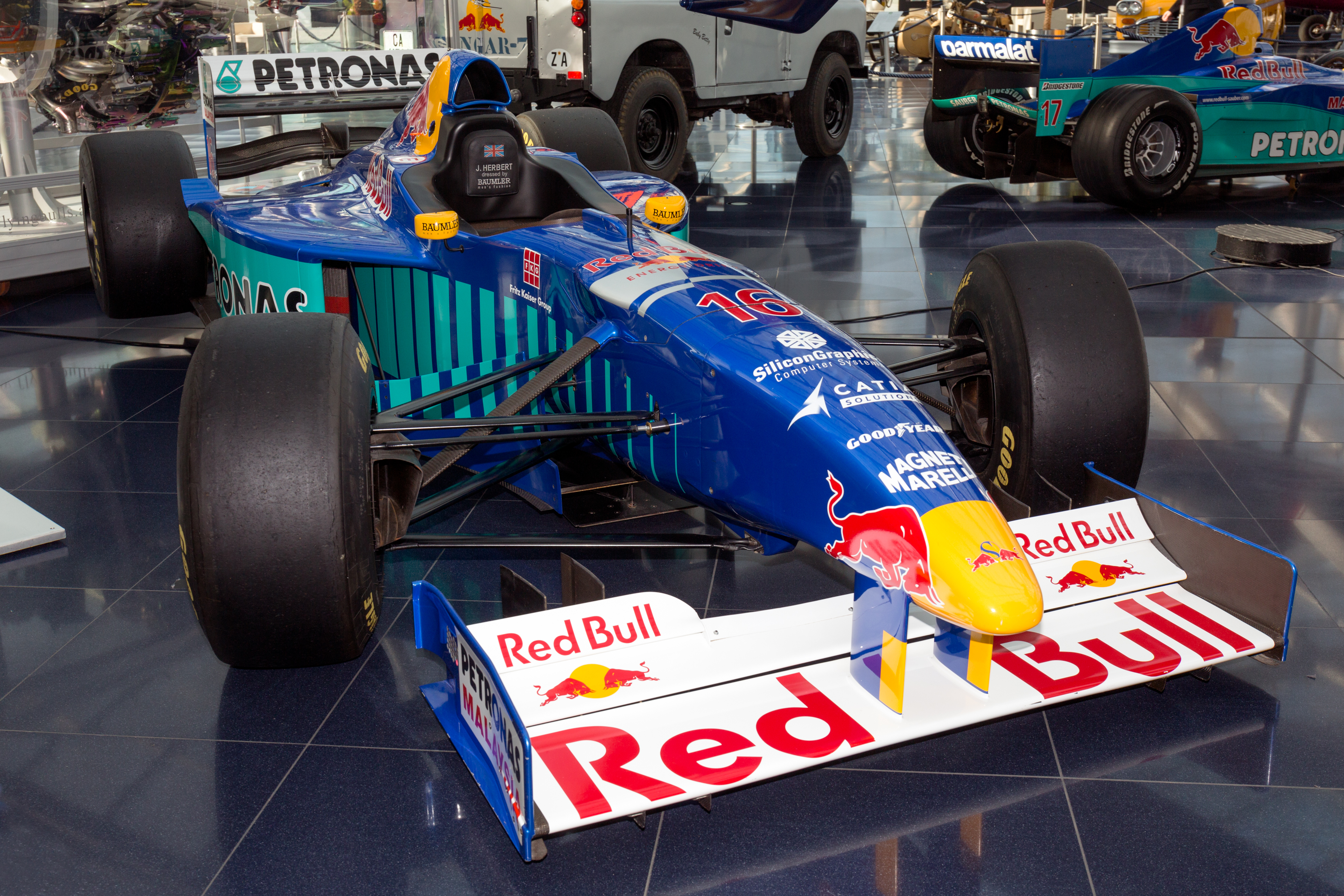
- The C16 of Johnny Herbert on display at the Hangar-7 Museum.
- Category: Formula One
- Constructor: Sauber
- Designers: Leo Ress (Technical Director); Osamu Goto (Engine Director); Ian Thomson (Head of Chassis Design); Rene Hilhorst (Head of Aerodynamics); Mike Jennings (Chief Aerodynamicist)
- Predecessor: Sauber C15
- Successor: Sauber C17

Technical specifications
- Chassis: carbon-fibre and honeycomb composite structure
- Suspension (front): double wishbones, pushrod, coil spring/damper
- Suspension (rear): double wishbones, pushrod, coil spring/damper
- Engine: Petronas SPE-01 (Ferrari Tipo 046) 3.0-litre 75-degree V10
- Transmission: Sauber six-speed longitudinally-mounted sequential semi-automatic
- Power: 720–730 hp (536.9–544.4 kW) @ 16,500 rpm
- Fuel: Shell
- Lubricants: Shell
- Tyres: Goodyear

Competition history
- Notable entrants: Red Bull Sauber Petronas
- Notable drivers: 16. (United Kingdom) Johnny Herbert; 17. (Italy) Nicola Larini; 17. (Italy) Gianni Morbidelli; 17. (Argentina) Norberto Fontana
- Debut: 1997 Australian Grand Prix
- Last event: 1997 European Grand Prix
Races	Wins	Podiums	Poles	F/Laps
17	0	1	0	0
- Constructors' Championships: 0
- Drivers' Championships: 0

The Sauber C16 was the car with which the Sauber team competed in the 1997 Formula One World Championship. It was initially driven by Briton Johnny Herbert, who was in his second season with the team, and Italian Nicola Larini.

The C16 was the first independent private Formula One car to utilize Ferrari-sourced customer engines since the BMS Scuderia Italia-operated Lola T93/30 in the 1993 season.

== Summary ==
Larini's place in the team was secured via an arrangement that gave the team the previous year's Ferrari customer engines that were used in the F310 that scored three wins in 1996, badged as Petronas in deference to the team's major Malaysian sponsor. This agreement to use Ferrari engines lasted until the team's purchase by BMW for 2006.

However, Larini, Ferrari's test driver, was unhappy with the team's ambience and quit after five Grands Prix. Fellow Italian Gianni Morbidelli was brought in as a replacement, but he broke his arm on two occasions during the year and had to be replaced by Argentine rookie Norberto Fontana whilst he recovered. All three drivers were comprehensively out-performed by Herbert.

Initially the C16 car was designed to accommodate Ford Zetec engine but the decision to change from Ford to Ferrari engines in November 1996 brought with it several challenges for the design team led by Sauber technical director Leo Ress. Where the Ford engine featured the V8 mounted to the back of the engine, the additional two-cylinders positioned in the V shape of the cylinder bank, the Petronas-branded Ferrari engine included all three components attached to the rear of the engine and thus required Sauber to change their design approach. In order to accommodate the SPE-01, Sauber had to redevelop their engine bay, gearbox and the rear suspension geometry due to lateness in the engine switch deal. The SPE-01 engine allowed the team more flexibility with the size and position of the fuel cell and allowed the engine to be positioned closer to the driver, however the additional 2 cylinders position on the engine created difficulties as it protruded into the space occupied by the gearbox housing. The team were subsequently required to redesign the gearbox and completely overhaul the rear suspension mounting points in order to fit the engine.

The changes required to accommodate the SPE-01 allowed Sauber to develop a radical design to the rear suspension geometry as well as wheelbase elongation. The design combined all of the upper elements of the suspension into a single piece, thus minimizing the amount of bodywork in a key area of the chassis and in turn reducing drag whilst giving the team a greater degree of control over air flowing over the rear diffuser and producing more aerodynamic grip.

The switch to Petronas-branded Ferrari engines resulted in few problems for the team. During pre-season testing, the C16 was observed to have burn marks on the rear of the engine cowling caused by the semi-tight packaging and insufficient cooling for the peak engine temperature. The team introduced a temporary cooling package for the duration of the test ahead of a planned update to the car's bodywork, and later expressed confidence that the engine reliability issues had been resolved.

Against some expectations, the car was competitive at the beginning of the season, but fell away slightly as the season progressed due to lack of development compared with better-funded rivals. Herbert's impressive season culminated in the team's third-ever podium finish at the 1997 Hungarian Grand Prix (where he also beat both works Ferraris). He scored all but one of the team's tally of points.

The team eventually finished seventh in the Constructors' Championship, with 16 points.

Many years later, some photos were leaked showing a top secret test carried out by Michael Schumacher in the C16 at Ferrari's test track at Fiorano in Italy. The test took place in September 1997 in a de-badged C16.

== Livery ==
The livery remained mostly the same to its predecessor, with a minor changes on the dash pattern.

== Complete Formula One results ==
(key) (results in bold indicate pole position)

Year	Team	Engine	Tyres	Drivers	1	2	3	4	5	6	7	8	9	10	11	12	13	14	15	16	17	Points	WCC
1997	Red Bull Sauber Petronas	Petronas V10	**G**		AUS	BRA	ARG	SMR	MON	ESP	CAN	FRA	GBR	GER	HUN	BEL	ITA	AUT	LUX	JPN	EUR	**16**	**7th**
1997	Red Bull Sauber Petronas	Petronas V10	**G**	(United Kingdom) Johnny Herbert	Ret	7	4	Ret	Ret	5	5	8	Ret	Ret	3	4	Ret	8	7	6	8	**16**	**7th**
1997	Red Bull Sauber Petronas	Petronas V10	**G**	(Italy) Nicola Larini	6	11	Ret	7	Ret													**16**	**7th**
1997	Red Bull Sauber Petronas	Petronas V10	**G**	(Italy) Gianni Morbidelli						14	10				Ret	9	12	9	9	DNS		**16**	**7th**
1997	Red Bull Sauber Petronas	Petronas V10	**G**	(Argentina) Norberto Fontana								Ret	9	9							14	**16**	**7th**
