= Lola T97/30 =

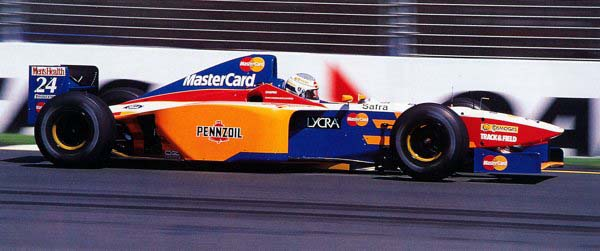
- Vincenzo Sospiri driving the T97/30 during the qualifying session at the Australian Grand Prix
- Category: Formula One
- Constructor: Lola
- Designers: Eric Broadley (Chassis); Chris Saunders (Aerodynamics)
- Predecessor: Lola T93/30 (BMS Scuderia Italia); Lola T95/30 (test car only)
- Successor: Lola B10/30/Lola MB-01 (never raced)

Technical specifications
- Chassis: Carbon fibre/aluminium honeycomb monocoque
- Suspension (front): Inboard pushrod/bellcrank-actuated double wishbones
- Suspension (rear): As front
- Length: Unknown
- Width: Unknown
- Height: Unknown
- Axle track: Unknown
- Wheelbase: Unknown
- Engine: Ford ECA Zetec-R 75-degree V8
- Transmission: Lola 6-speed sequential
- Weight: 520 kilograms (1,150 lb)
- Fuel: Texaco
- Lubricants: Pennzoil
- Tyres: Bridgestone

Competition history
- Notable entrants: MasterCard Lola F1 Team
- Notable drivers: 24. (Italy) Vincenzo Sospiri; 25. (Brazil) Ricardo Rosset; TD. (Italy) Andrea Montermini
- Debut: 1997 Australian Grand Prix (Did not qualify)
Races	Wins	Poles	F/Laps
1 (0 starts)	0	0	0
- Teams' Championships: 0
- Constructors' Championships: 0
- Drivers' Championships: 0

The Lola T97/30 was the car with which the MasterCard Lola Formula One team attempted to compete in the 1997 Formula One season. It was driven by Vincenzo Sospiri, the 1995 Formula 3000 champion who had previously served as a test driver for Benetton, and Ricardo Rosset, who moved from Footwork.

However, the team's tenure in F1 was brief. The T97/30 was the first Lola chassis to compete in the sport since the uncompetitive T93/30 that had been used by BMS Scuderia Italia in 1993. The T97/30 had initially planned around an entry for the 1998 season. However, due to pressure from main sponsor MasterCard, the car was rushed into service a year before the initial plan. The T97/30 proved to be a slow and underdeveloped car in comparison to those being used by other teams, failing to qualify with either Sospiri or Rosset at its only attempt(s) which was the opening round of the 1997 season in Australia before the team and cars were withdrawn from the next race in Brazil. Neither the T97/30 nor the team would be seen again competing at a Grand Prix thereafter as Lola withdrew from the 1997 championship due to financial and technical difficulties having only competed (and performed very poorly) in one race weekend. As of 2025, the T97/30 is last Lola chassis to compete at a Formula One World Championship Grand Prix weekend.

== Competition history ==
=== Pre season and launch ===
Lola was the second new team for the 1997 season, the other being Stewart Grand Prix, whom team founder and the T97/30's designer Eric Broadley claimed in pre-season before his cars' launch in early-1997 was the team he felt his outfit should be beating. Broadley also cited fellow Bridgestone tyre using outfit Arrows -that had had signed then-defending World Champion Damon Hill for 1997 as another team that would be a benchmark for Lola's 1997 performance. Because of sponsor MasterCard's eagerness to get the team running a year earlier than planned, the team hastily built the T97/30 just weeks before the season began. Whilst Stewart (who had announced their entry even before the start of the 1996 season) had completed weeks of testing, Lola had barely covered any mileage before the season opener. The T97/30 was launched at the Hilton Hotel in London on 20 February 1997.

=== Australia weekend and Silverstone test ===
Broadley's pre-season ambitions of competing with and beating the Ford-backed Stewart team proved to be very far wide of the mark at first round of the season in Melbourne, where first brief tests showed that both cars were slow in a straight line and also in the corners; the aerodynamics producing too much drag and not enough downforce. This also meant the cars could not get the tyres up to the right temperature. Neither driver could get near a good enough time to qualify, as they struggled in the difficult-handling cars. In the end both Sospiri and Rosset failed to qualify, 11.6 and 12.7 seconds respectively off the pace, whilst both Stewart Grand Prix cars comfortably qualified for the same race. The cars were tested at Silverstone shortly after the Australian Grand Prix but both were again slowest with times in excess of 9 seconds off the front runners.

=== End of the road for car and team ===
The cars were transported to Brazil for the race at Interlagos, but title sponsor MasterCard withdrew their support (with all other sponsors later following MasterCard's suit at the last minute) and they remained in the garage for the rest of the weekend, subsequently withdrawing from the championship.

The team were unclassified in the Constructors' Championship, with no race starts or finishes, nor points.

== Complete Formula One results ==
(key) (results in bold indicate pole position)

Year	Entrant	Engine	Tyres	Drivers	1	2	3	4	5	6	7	8	9	10	11	12	13	14	15	16	17	Points	WCC
1997	MasterCard Lola	Ford Zetec R ECA 3.0 V8	**B**		AUS	BRA	ARG	SMR	MON	ESP	CAN	FRA	GBR	GER	HUN	BEL	ITA	AUT	LUX	JPN	EUR	0	NC
1997	MasterCard Lola	Ford Zetec R ECA 3.0 V8	**B**	(Italy) Vincenzo Sospiri	DNQ	WD																0	NC
1997	MasterCard Lola	Ford Zetec R ECA 3.0 V8	**B**	(Brazil) Ricardo Rosset	DNQ	WD																0	NC

== Locations ==
The locations of the four T97/30 chassis (as of 2007) are as follows:

- T97/30-1 (Sospiri): Canadian racing school.
- T97/30-2 (Rosset): Canadian racing school.
- T97/30-3 (spare car): owned by Martin Birrane, the current owner of Lola. On display at the Mondello Park circuit museum.
- T97/30-4 (unfinished): Lola factory, Huntingdon.
