= Lola T93/30 =

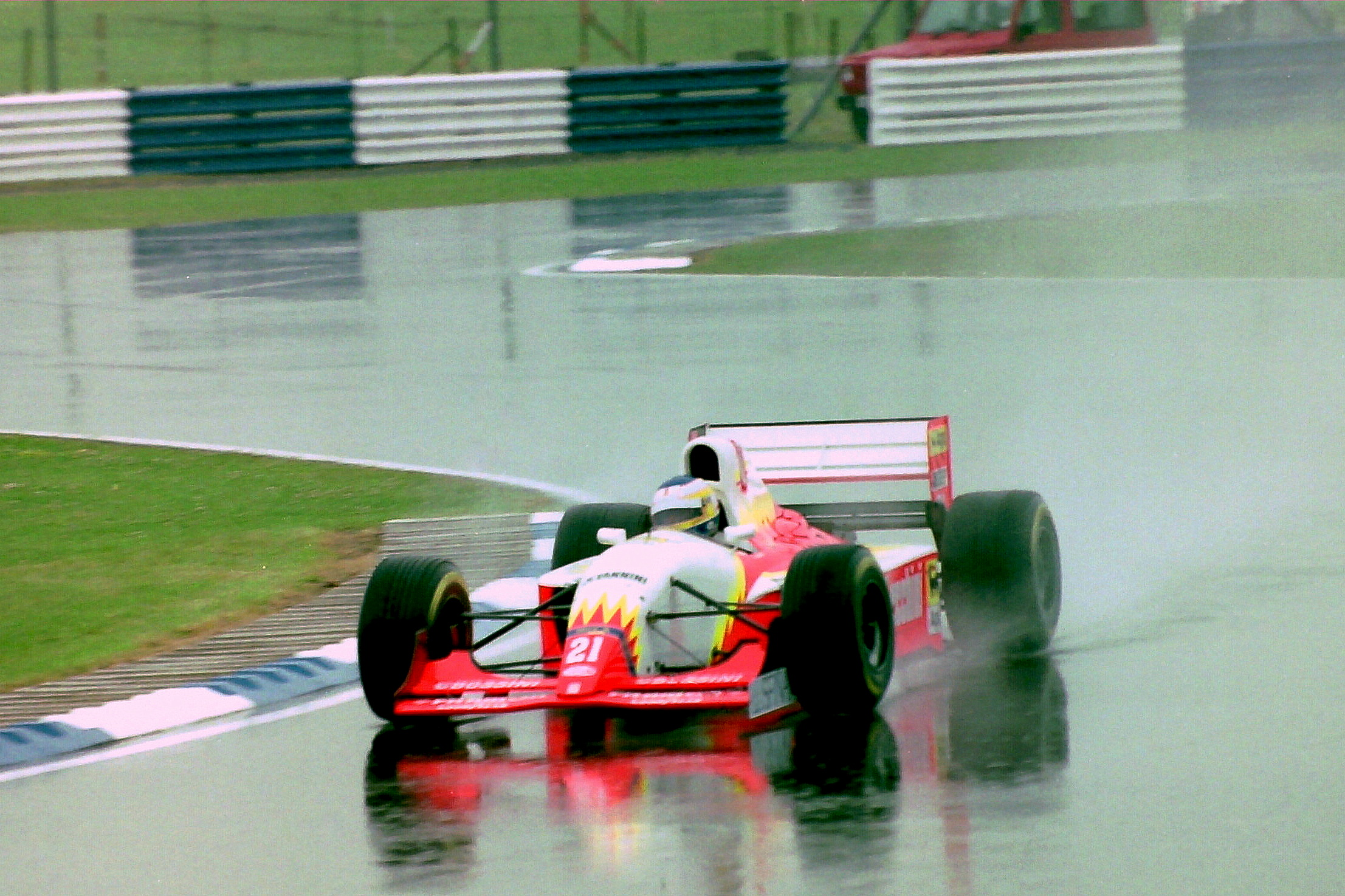
- Category: Formula One
- Constructor: Lola Cars
- Designer: Eric Broadley
- Predecessor: Lola LC91 (Lola Cars/Larrousse); Dallara F192 (BMS Scuderia Italia)
- Successor: Lola T95/30 (test car only); Lola T97/30 (MasterCard Lola)

Technical specifications
- Chassis: Carbon fibre and Aluminium honeycomb composite monocoque
- Suspension (front): Double wishbones, pushrod, twin spring / dampers
- Suspension (rear): Double wishbones, pushrod, twin spring / dampers
- Axle track: Front: 1,690 mm (67 in); Rear: 1,610 mm (63 in)
- Wheelbase: 2,975 mm (117.1 in)
- Engine: Ferrari Tipo 038 (E1 A-92), 3,494 cc (213.2 cu in), 65° V12, NA, mid-engine, longitudinally mounted
- Transmission: BMS Hewland 6-speed semi-automatic
- Weight: 510 kg (1,120 lb)
- Fuel: Agip
- Tyres: Goodyear

Competition history
- Notable entrants: Lola BMS Scuderia Italia
- Notable drivers: 21. (Italy) Michele Alboreto; 22. (Italy) Luca Badoer
- Debut: 1993 South African Grand Prix
| Races | Wins | Poles | F/Laps |
|---|---|---|---|
| 14 | 0 | 0 | 0 |
- Constructors' Championships: 0

The Lola T93/30 was the Formula One car built by Lola Cars and raced by the BMS Scuderia Italia team for the 1993 Formula One season. Scuderia Italia, which did not construct its own cars, had previously run Dallara chassis since its first season in 1988, but team owner Beppe Lucchini elected to switch to Lola after an uncompetitive 1992 season.

However, the T93/30 proved to be the least competitive car on the 1993 grid. Its lack of success was to such an extent that Scuderia Italia opted not to compete in the final two Grands Prix of the season, and subsequently merged with the Minardi team for 1994. As such, the T93/30 was the final F1 car to be raced solely by Scuderia Italia, and is also the last Lola chassis to have started a Grand Prix as the T95/30 which succeeded it in 1995 was merely a test mule ahead of Lola's intended future entry with its own team. Whilst Lola did initially enter a self-owned team the 1997 season with the T95/30's successor-the T97/30 that car also never contested a Grand Prix as that car failed to qualify in its only entry at the 1997 Australian Grand Prix before Lola withdrew due to financial problems.

The Lola T93/30 was the last Formula One car to be powered by Ferrari engine before Ferrari took a customer supply hiatus from 1994 until its return from 1997 with the then-youngest team Sauber.

== Concept ==
Since its first race, the 1988 Brazilian Grand Prix, the Scuderia Italia team had competed in F1 with cars designed by the Italian racing car constructor Dallara, with occasional success. However, the previous year's Dallara 192 chassis, albeit a points-scorer, had generally been less competitive than hoped for. This was exacerbated by the fact that Scuderia Italia had made a deal with the Ferrari team to buy its engines that were more powerful than the Judd and Ford used in 1991 and before. However, the 1992 season resulted in no real performance gain despite the additional power, suggesting the chassis was at fault. By mid-season, Lucchini had signed a deal with Lola for the British company to take Dallara's place in designing and constructing chassis for his team's use, forming an organisation called "Lola BMS Scuderia Italia".

Lola had a strong F1 pedigree. Having built its first F1 car, the Mk4, for 1962, the company had since built cars which had been run by the Honda, Embassy Hill, and Larrousse teams; the "Hondola" RA300 proving to be a race winner at the 1967 Italian Grand Prix. It was also up-to-date, as its most recent association with Larrousse had ended in 1991, and had also built chassis for many other motorsport formulae. The partnership between Scuderia Italia and Lola was therefore seen as a long-term strategy to move the team to the front of the F1 field.

== Construction ==
The deal with Lola saw the firm, headed by Eric Broadley, construct the T93/30 chassis and gearbox in its base near Huntingdon, into which the Ferrari engine was then fitted. The chassis, produced around a carbon fibre monocoque, was a conventional design, and did not feature any of the electronic driver aids such as traction control and active suspension that were being adopted by the top teams during this period. The designation "T93/30" stood for "Type 1993", with the "/30" suffix indicating that it was an F1 car. Three T93/30s were used by the Scuderia Italia team during the course of the season.

Both of the team's 1992 drivers, Pierluigi Martini and JJ Lehto, had moved on over the winter, so an Italian duo of veteran Michele Alboreto who had 5 Grand Prix wins to his name (though he had not won a GP since Germany in 1985) and reigning International Formula 3000 champion Luca Badoer were signed for 1993. Lucchini also signed a sponsorship deal with the Chesterfield cigarette brand that saw the cars abandon their traditional all-red livery in favour of a white-and-red combination bisected by yellow zig-zags.

== Racing history ==
"Michele did one installation lap at Estoril and called me over. He lifted his visor and said, 'We're dead!'.
The F1 project was overseen personally by Broadley because, I think, he wanted to finish his career in glory. He came up with what was a very old-fashioned car."

— Alessandro Mariani, Scuderia Italia senior engineer, on the T93/30.

The T93/30's début at the 1993 South African Grand Prix proved difficult: Alboreto and Badoer qualified slowest of all in 25th and 26th positions respectively, and reported that problems with the car's aerodynamics made it "virtually undriveable". Both drivers retired from the race with mechanical problems. For the second round of the championship, the official withdrawal of the March team – who had already missed the first round of the championship – from the sport reduced the number of competitors from 28 to 26. Correspondingly, it was declared that only the fastest 24 qualifiers would be permitted to start the race. The teams unanimously chose to raise this to 25 to ensure that every team could qualify at least one car, but Scuderia Italia's position was still precarious. However, both cars managed to qualify for and then finish the race, with Alboreto eleventh and Badoer twelfth.

At the European Grand Prix, Badoer set the slowest time and failed to qualify for the race, whilst Alboreto took another eleventh-place finish. However, Alboreto then failed to qualify for the next race at Imola and of the five races after that, failed to qualify four times compared to Badoer's once. During this period, Badoer took the T93/30's best finish of seventh (only one place outside the points-paying positions) after an attritional San Marino race, and a further fifteenth-place finish in Canada, whilst the team's other starts resulted in retirements. At the British Grand Prix, Badoer's retirement with electrical failure resulted in the deployment of the safety car, as his abandoned car was judged to be in a dangerous position. The T93/30 was now established as the slowest car in the field, a situation that appeared to have a more negative effect on Alboreto than Badoer.

Prior to the German Grand Prix, the teams unanimously agreed to allow all of the drivers to qualify for the race. However, this made no difference to the T93/30's competitiveness, and the drivers continued to qualify and race near or at the back of the field. Reliability was slightly improved, however, and the team managed its second double-finish at the Belgian Grand Prix. In addition, Badoer made it to the finish for three races in a row, including a top ten result at Scuderia Italia's second home race in Monza. This event was judged to be the car's most competitive performance of the year, helped by the fact that the Ferrari engines were equipped with pneumatic valves for the first time.

However, there was disappointment in the Lola camp, because Michele Alboreto could have scored one point in that race if the car had not broken down.

By this stage, Lola and Scuderia Italia had already announced that they would split for 1994, whilst Ferrari had also confirmed that it would no longer supply engines to the team. The relationship between Scuderia Italia and Lola had deteriorated, with each party blaming the other for the car's poor performance. Scuderia Italia even sent Sergio Rinland – who had designed the Dallara 188 used by the team in 1988 – to the Lola headquarters, only for him to be refused entry to the building. Following the Portuguese Grand Prix, with only two "fly-away" races held outside Europe remaining, Lucchini elected to end his team's campaign early. The T93/30's record thus stood at a combined 28 race entries with 21 starts and a best finish of seventh.

== Legacy ==
The T93/30 was a conventional car that was on reflection too conventional. Its aerodynamic performance was poor and resulted in unwieldy handling, whilst the Lola engineers failed to extract the potential power of the Ferrari V12 engine, instead finding that its torque was limited in low and medium-speed corners. The T93/30 was also handicapped by its lack of electronic driver aids. Indeed, Scuderia Italia was the only team not to be using any such devices by the time of the 1993 Canadian Grand Prix.

The T93/30's performance was a great disappointment to both Scuderia Italia and Lola, both of whom agreed that the undertaking had been a serious misjudgement in retrospect. Following the conclusion of the 1993 season, Lucchini opted to amalgamate his remaining sponsorship and facilities with the Minardi outfit, an Italian team which manufactured its own cars but was perennially short of money. The active association lasted for a further two seasons, with Lucchini winding down his involvement in 1996 before selling his remaining shares in 1999. Although Scuderia Italia continues to exist in motorsport, the T93/30 was the final car to be raced by the team in F1.

Meanwhile, Lola elected to begin a full F1 programme without input from an existing team. In 1995 the team produced a T95/30 chassis which was tested by Allan McNish, but never raced in F1. Two years later, Lola entered into a financial partnership with MasterCard to form the MasterCard Lola F1 team. However, the construction of its T97/30 chassis was rushed and neither of the team's drivers qualified for the 1997 Australian Grand Prix. MasterCard Lola withdrew from the 1997 championship thereafter, meaning that the T93/30 is also the last Lola chassis to compete in an F1 race to date.

In January 2009, the motorsport magazine Autosport ranked the T93/30 in fifth position as part of a "top ten rubbish F1 cars list".

== Complete Formula One results ==
(key) (Results in bold indicate pole position; results in italics indicate fastest lap.)

| Year | Entrant | Engine | Tyres | Drivers | 1 | 2 | 3 | 4 | 5 | 6 | 7 | 8 | 9 | 10 | 11 | 12 | 13 | 14 | 15 | 16 | Points | WCC |
|---|---|---|---|---|---|---|---|---|---|---|---|---|---|---|---|---|---|---|---|---|---|---|
| 1993 | Lola BMS Scuderia Italia | Ferrari Tipo 038 (E1 A-92) V12 | **G** | | RSA | BRA | EUR | SMR | ESP | MON | CAN | FRA | GBR | GER | HUN | BEL | ITA | POR | JPN | AUS | **0** | **NC** |
| 1993 | Lola BMS Scuderia Italia | Ferrari Tipo 038 (E1 A-92) V12 | **G** | Michele Alboreto | Ret | 11 | 11 | DNQ | DNQ | Ret | DNQ | DNQ | DNQ | 16 | Ret | 14 | Ret | Ret | | | **0** | **NC** |
| 1993 | Lola BMS Scuderia Italia | Ferrari Tipo 038 (E1 A-92) V12 | **G** | Luca Badoer | Ret | 12 | DNQ | 7 | Ret | DNQ | 15 | Ret | Ret | Ret | Ret | 13 | 10 | 14 | | | **0** | **NC** |
