= 107% rule =

Formula One rule

The 107% rule is a sporting regulation affecting Formula One racing qualifying sessions. During the first phase of qualifying, if the circuit is dry, any driver who is eliminated in the first qualifying session and fails to set a lap within 107% of the fastest time in that session will not be allowed to start the race without permission from the race stewards. For example, if the fastest Q1 lap time was 100 seconds, each driver who is eliminated in the session must complete at least one lap within 107 seconds to guarantee a race start. The 107% rule was introduced for the 1996 season and remained in force until 2002. It was reintroduced for the 2011 season with minor modifications due to the knock-out qualifying format.

== History ==
Unless the track was declared wet by the race director, any driver eliminated during Q1 whose best qualifying lap exceeds 107% of the fastest time set during that session, or who fails to set a time, will not be allowed to take part in the race. Under exceptional circumstances however, which may include setting a suitable lap time in a free practice session, the stewards may permit the car to start the race.

Any driver accepted in this manner will be placed at the back of the starting grid after any other penalties have been applied.

Should there be more than one driver accepted in this manner they will be arranged on the grid in the order they were classified in P3.

– Article 35.1 of the 2018 Formula One Sporting Regulations

=== Introduction ===
The governing body of F1, the Fédération Internationale de l'Automobile (FIA), introduced the 107% rule at a meeting of its World Motor Sport Council in June 1995, immediately prior to the French Grand Prix. This followed a recommendation from the Formula One Commission, a working group of F1 representatives, to introduce such a measure. Over the previous few years, the number of entries per season had dropped to 26, the maximum threshold for race starters, allowing every entrant to qualify for the race regardless of speed. For 1995, new technical regulations spaced out the field, whilst numerous teams with comparatively small budgets and slow cars, such as Forti, Pacific, and Simtek, were competing in the sport. The regulation was originally planned to come into effect from the 1995 Hungarian Grand Prix, but this required unanimous support amongst the teams, and was vetoed by Forti and Pacific. Nevertheless, the fact that it was supported by the majority of the teams allowed the 107% rule's introduction from the start of the 1996 season. The mid-1990s also brought a number of pay drivers to the sport whose speeds would not have allowed them to race, such as Giovanni Lavaggi and Jean-Denis Delétraz.

Commenting on the introduction of the 107% rule, FIA President Max Mosley said that "any small team which is properly organised will be able to get within the 107 per cent margin". The sport's commercial rights holder, Bernie Ecclestone, agreed with this sentiment, saying in an interview that "Formula 1 is the best. And we don't need anything in it that isn't the best." He also accused some of the smaller teams of having a "startline special" mentality, in that they were solely concerned with entering the race to gain television coverage for their sponsors, and were not too occupied with actual performance given that all the entrants were guaranteed to make the race. On the other hand, the smaller teams were concerned at the prospect of having to lap within a maximum time in order to qualify, which they saw as exacerbating the inequalities already existent within the sport. Pacific's commercial manager, Mark Gallagher, said: "We have to say the 107% rule gives rise to concern among teams without works engines. It's got more to do with engines than chassis, and that's an area outside our direct capability. Closing the gap to Minardi is quite feasible, but the sudden arrival of the rule is worrying. If you have three years to plan whether or not to do something, that's very different from having the goalposts moved while you are playing the game."

=== Application ===
The 107% rule was thus introduced at the 1996 Australian Grand Prix. It was breached immediately, as Forti drivers Luca Badoer and Andrea Montermini failed to lap within 107% of Jacques Villeneuve's pole position time. This had been an expected outcome, as the team was using an upgraded version of the previous year's Forti FG01 chassis, which had only qualified within 107% of pole position on one of thirty-four occasions beforehand. Both drivers also failed to qualify for the European Grand Prix, the fourth round of the championship. At the following race, the San Marino Grand Prix, Badoer drove the more competitive FG03 chassis for the first time, whilst Montermini failed to make the 107% cut in the older car. Both then failed to qualify for the Spanish Grand Prix two races later. By the tenth round of the championship, the British Grand Prix, the team was running out of money and made only a token attempt to qualify after not taking part in the preceding free practice sessions, neither car making the time limit. Following the next race, in which the team did not complete any laps at all, Forti withdrew from Formula One. In the latter half of the season, the Minardi team replaced regular driver Giancarlo Fisichella with the paying Giovanni Lavaggi, who failed to make the 107% cut at the German, Belgian, and Japanese Grands Prix.

In 1997, the 107% rule was only invoked at the season-opening Australian Grand Prix. Villeneuve again set pole position with a time over a second faster than his nearest rival, resulting in a well-spaced field. As a result, Pedro Diniz, Vincenzo Sospiri, and Ricardo Rosset all failed to make the 107% mark. Diniz was allowed to race at the discretion of the race stewards, who judged him capable of lapping within the limit, as he had indeed done so during the free practice session prior to qualifying. The FIA cited "exceptional circumstances" as the reason for his failure to do so during the qualifying session itself. Sospiri and Rosset, driving for the new MasterCard Lola team, were five and six seconds off Diniz's time respectively, and well outside the qualification limit. Neither driver was allowed to start the race, and the team folded before the next Grand Prix.

During the 1998 season, Rosset—now driving for the Tyrrell team—failed to qualify on five occasions. He lapped outside the 107% time during qualifying sessions for the Spanish, Monaco, Hungarian, and Japanese Grands Prix. He also failed to qualify for the German Grand Prix, but this was due to him not completing any laps at all after injuring his right elbow as a result of a heavy crash during free practice.

The 107% rule was invoked on two occasions in 1999. At the first round of the championship—the Australian Grand Prix—Marc Gené failed to lap within the required percentage of the pole position time in his Minardi. As with Diniz two years earlier, he was given dispensation to race after lapping within the limit during the free practice sessions. At the French Grand Prix later in the season, a qualifying session marked by a varying intensity of rainfall saw five drivers—Damon Hill, Gené, Luca Badoer, Pedro de la Rosa, and Toranosuke Takagi—miss the cut-off, but all were allowed to start the race.

After a 2000 season in which no driver transgressed the 107% rule, it was enforced on three occasions in 2001. At the opening race in Australia, Tarso Marques failed to lap within the required time for Minardi. He was given permission to race under the reason of "exceptional circumstances", but this was despite the fact that he had not managed to set a time within the 107% mark in any session all weekend. It was rumoured that Marques was allowed to race because the team had been bought prior to the start of the season by Australian Paul Stoddart, who wanted both cars to compete in Minardi's new "home" Grand Prix. At the British Grand Prix, Marques again fell foul of the regulation, but was not allowed to start on this occasion. The Belgian Grand Prix also witnessed a wet qualifying session in which the track steadily dried, resulting in the four slowest qualifiers—Jos Verstappen, Fernando Alonso, Enrique Bernoldi, and Marques—failing to lap within 107% of pole position. As in the similar case of the French Grand Prix two years previously, all were allowed to start the race.

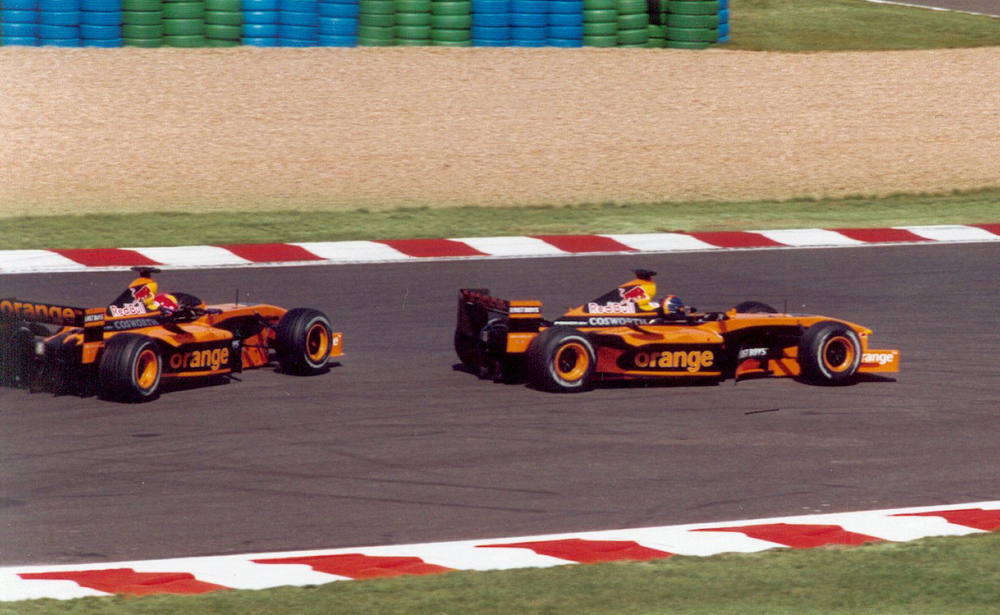
The Arrows team deliberately failed to qualify for the 2002 French Grand Prix due to financial problems.

The 107% rule also came into effect during the 2002 season. At the first round of the championship, the Australian Grand Prix, Takuma Sato crashed heavily during free practice and had to use the Jordan team's spare car for qualifying, only for the replacement to stop with a gearbox problem without setting a time. By the time his teammate, Fisichella, did his first run and handed over his own chassis, it had begun to rain, leaving Sato with no chance of making the required time. However, he was allowed to start the race as in the case of previous cases affected by changeable weather conditions. Minardi driver Alex Yoong failed to qualify for the San Marino, British, and German Grands Prix under the conditions of the rule, a turn of events which led to his replacement by Anthony Davidson for two races. At the French Grand Prix, the Arrows team was running out of money and made a token appearance during the qualifying session to avoid FIA-imposed fines for missing rounds of the championship; drivers Heinz-Harald Frentzen and Bernoldi failed to lap within the required time. Frentzen subsequently left the circuit with ten minutes of the session still remaining, making the team's ploy obvious. Fisichella also failed to qualify as he did not set a time during this session, although this was the result of his withdrawal from the event following a heavy crash during free practice.

In total, there were 37 cases in which the 107% rule was broken during the period in which it was a Formula One Sporting Regulation. Of these, 13 drivers were allowed to start the relevant race due to "exceptional circumstances". The rule affected 23 out of the 116 Grands Prix in which it applied.

=== Abolition ===
The qualifying system changed for the 2003 season with the introduction of two ordered single-lap sessions to replace the previous free hour-long session in which drivers were allowed to complete twelve laps. Drivers also had to qualify with the race fuel on board their cars. Due to the scope for greater time disparities throughout the field that could occur as a result, the 107% rule was not mentioned when the FIA finalised the format prior to the beginning of the season, despite an earlier assurance that the rule would still apply. The governing body subsequently proposed the formal cancellation of the rule, which ceased to apply with effect from the 2002 Japanese Grand Prix.

Following the 2003 season, the timing of the two single-lap sessions was altered for them to occur on the same day, within 15 minutes of each other. This proved unpopular with the smaller teams, who were liable to make their runs at the end of the first session (as this was run in championship order) and at the beginning of the second session (which was run in reverse order of the results of the first session), and with TV spectators, who had to watch a longer programme as a result. During the 2004 season, the system's flaws were exposed, and proposed changes to the qualifying system made midway through the championship at one point seemed to suggest that the 107% rule would return as part of a new format. In the end, however, only minor changes relating to the timing of the existing sessions were made. Minardi team owner Paul Stoddart was particularly opposed to the reintroduction of the rule.

=== Reintroduction ===
At the start of the 2010 season, new FIA President Jean Todt said that he was in favour of re-introducing the 107% rule, as the qualifying system had changed again so that all of the sessions were carried out with low fuel levels.

On 23 June, a meeting of the FIA World Motor Sport Council determined that the 107% rule would be reintroduced for the 2011 season. The rule applies only to the first of the three qualifying sessions for each race.

From its re-introduction to the end of the 2015 season, the 107% rule was broken a further 17 times at 12 different races, all but one by HRT, Caterham, and Virgin/Marussia drivers. Unlike the rule's first period of application, where infringing drivers were very rarely allowed to compete, only four of these occurrences of rule violation resulted in the drivers being barred from the race. These were Vitantonio Liuzzi and Narain Karthikeyan at the 2011 Australian Grand Prix, and Pedro de la Rosa and Karthikeyan at the 2012 Australian Grand Prix – all of whom drove for HRT.

At the 2016 Hungarian Grand Prix, eleven drivers failed to reach the 107% limit as the session was stopped for inclement weather and subsequent incidents, but all were permitted to compete. Beginning with the 2018 season, the regulations were amended so that the 107% rule would not be enforced if the track was declared wet by the race director during qualifying.

== List of 107% rule violations ==
107% rule in its first iteration (1996–2002)
Year	Event	Pole position time	107% time	Driver	Team	Time	% of pole	Allowed to race?
1996	Australian Grand Prix	1:32.371	1:38.837	(Italy) Luca Badoer	(Italy) Forti	1:39.202	107.395	No
1996	Australian Grand Prix	1:32.371	1:38.837	(Italy) Andrea Montermini	(Italy) Forti	1:42.087	110.518	No
1996	European Grand Prix	1:18.941	1:24.467	(Italy) Andrea Montermini	(Italy) Forti	1:25.053	107.742	No
1996	European Grand Prix	1:18.941	1:24.467	(Italy) Luca Badoer	(Italy) Forti	1:25.840	108.739	No
1996	San Marino Grand Prix	1:26.890	1:32.972	(Italy) Andrea Montermini	(Italy) Forti	1:33.685	107.802	No
1996	Spanish Grand Prix	1:20.650	1:26.295	(Italy) Luca Badoer	(Italy) Forti	1:26.615	107.396	No
1996	Spanish Grand Prix	1:20.650	1:26.295	(Italy) Andrea Montermini	(Italy) Forti	1:27.358	108.317	No
1996	British Grand Prix	1:26.875	1:32.956	(Italy) Andrea Montermini	(Italy) Forti	1:35.206	109.590	No
1996	British Grand Prix	1:26.875	1:32.956	(Italy) Luca Badoer	(Italy) Forti	1:35.304	109.702	No
1996	German Grand Prix	1:43.912	1:51.186	(Italy) Giovanni Lavaggi	(Italy) Minardi	1:51.357	107.165	No
1996	Belgian Grand Prix	1:50.574	1:58.314	(Italy) Giovanni Lavaggi	(Italy) Minardi	1:58.579	107.239	No
1996	Japanese Grand Prix	1:38.909	1:45.833	(Italy) Giovanni Lavaggi	(Italy) Minardi	1:46.795	107.973	No
1997	Australian Grand Prix	1:29.369	1:35.625	(Brazil) Pedro Diniz	(United Kingdom) Arrows	1:35.972	107.388	Yes
1997	Australian Grand Prix	1:29.369	1:35.625	(Italy) Vincenzo Sospiri	(United Kingdom) Lola	1:40.972	112.988	No
1997	Australian Grand Prix	1:29.369	1:35.625	(Brazil) Ricardo Rosset	(United Kingdom) Lola	1:42.086	114.230	No
1998	Spanish Grand Prix	1:20.262	1:25.880	(Brazil) Ricardo Rosset	(United Kingdom) Tyrrell	1:25.946	107.082	No
1998	Monaco Grand Prix	1:19.798	1:25.383	(Brazil) Ricardo Rosset	(United Kingdom) Tyrrell	1:25.737	107.443	No
1998	Hungarian Grand Prix	1:16.973	1:22.361	(Brazil) Ricardo Rosset	(United Kingdom) Tyrrell	1:23.140	108.012	No
1998	Japanese Grand Prix	1:36.293	1:43.033	(Brazil) Ricardo Rosset	(United Kingdom) Tyrrell	1:43.259	107.234	No
1999	Australian Grand Prix	1:30.462	1:36.794	(Spain) Marc Gené	(Italy) Minardi	1:37.013	107.242	Yes
1999	French Grand Prix	1:38.441	1:45.331	(United Kingdom) Damon Hill	(Republic of Ireland) Jordan	1:45.334	107.002	Yes
1999	French Grand Prix	1:38.441	1:45.331	(Spain) Marc Gené	(Italy) Minardi	1:46.324	108.008	Yes
1999	French Grand Prix	1:38.441	1:45.331	(Italy) Luca Badoer	(Italy) Minardi	1:46.784	108.475	Yes
1999	French Grand Prix	1:38.441	1:45.331	(Spain) Pedro de la Rosa	(United Kingdom) Arrows	1:48.215	109.929	Yes
1999	French Grand Prix	1:38.441	1:45.331	(Japan) Toranosuke Takagi	(United Kingdom) Arrows	1:48.322	110.038	Yes
2001	Australian Grand Prix	1:26.892	1:32.974	(Brazil) Tarso Marques	(Italy) Minardi	1:33.228	107.292	Yes
2001	British Grand Prix	1:20.447	1:26.078	(Brazil) Tarso Marques	(Italy) Minardi	1:26.508	107.534	No
2001	Belgian Grand Prix	1:52.072	1:59.917	(Netherlands) Jos Verstappen	(United Kingdom) Arrows	2:02.039	108.893	Yes
2001	Belgian Grand Prix	1:52.072	1:59.917	(Spain) Fernando Alonso	(Italy) Minardi	2:02.594	109.389	Yes
2001	Belgian Grand Prix	1:52.072	1:59.917	(Brazil) Enrique Bernoldi	(United Kingdom) Arrows	2:03.048	109.794	Yes
2001	Belgian Grand Prix	1:52.072	1:59.917	(Brazil) Tarso Marques	(Italy) Minardi	2:04.204	110.825	Yes
2002	Australian Grand Prix	1:25.843	1:31.852	(Japan) Takuma Sato	(Republic of Ireland) Jordan	1:53.351	132.045	Yes
2002	San Marino Grand Prix	1:21.091	1:26.767	(Malaysia) Alex Yoong	(Italy) Minardi	1:27.241	107.584	No
2002	British Grand Prix	1:18.998	1:24.527	(Malaysia) Alex Yoong	(Italy) Minardi	1:24.785	107.291	No
2002	French Grand Prix	1:11.985	1:17.023	(Germany) Heinz-Harald Frentzen	(United Kingdom) Arrows	1:18.497	109.046	No
2002	French Grand Prix	1:11.985	1:17.023	(Brazil) Enrique Bernoldi	(United Kingdom) Arrows	1:19.843	110.916	No
2002	German Grand Prix	1:14.389	1:19.596	(Malaysia) Alex Yoong	(Italy) Minardi	1:19.775	107.240	No

107% rule after adoption by first qualifying round (from 2011)
Year	Event	Q1 fastest time	107% time	Driver	Team	Time	% of fastest	Allowed to race?
2011	Australian Grand Prix	1:25.296	1:31.266	(Italy) Vitantonio Liuzzi	(Spain) HRT	1:32.978	109.006	No
2011	Australian Grand Prix	1:25.296	1:31.266	(India) Narain Karthikeyan	(Spain) HRT	1:34.293	110.547	No
2011	Canadian Grand Prix	1:13.822	1:18.989	(Belgium) Jérôme d'Ambrosio	(Russia) Virgin	1:19.414	107.575	Yes
2011	Belgian Grand Prix	2:01.813	2:10.339	(Belgium) Jérôme d'Ambrosio	(Russia) Virgin	2:11.601	108.035	Yes
2011	Belgian Grand Prix	2:01.813	2:10.339	(Italy) Vitantonio Liuzzi	(Spain) HRT	2:11.616	108.047	Yes
2011	Belgian Grand Prix	2:01.813	2:10.339	(Australia) Daniel Ricciardo	(Spain) HRT	2:13.077	109.246	Yes
2011	Indian Grand Prix	1:26.189	1:32.222	(Germany) Timo Glock	(Russia) Virgin	1:34.046	109.116	Yes
2012	Australian Grand Prix	1:26.182	1:32.214	(Spain) Pedro de la Rosa	(Spain) HRT	1:33.495	108.486	No
2012	Australian Grand Prix	1:26.182	1:32.214	(India) Narain Karthikeyan	(Spain) HRT	1:33.643	108.658	No
2012	Spanish Grand Prix	1:22.583	1:28.363	(India) Narain Karthikeyan	(Spain) HRT	1:31.122	110.340	Yes
2012	British Grand Prix	1:46.279	1:53.718	(France) Charles Pic	(Russia) Marussia	1:54.143	107.399	Yes
2013	Australian Grand Prix	1:43.380	1:50.616	(France) Charles Pic	(Malaysia) Caterham	1:50.626	107.009	Yes
2014	British Grand Prix	1:40.380	1:47.406	(Sweden) Marcus Ericsson	(Malaysia) Caterham	1:49.421	109.006	Yes
2014	British Grand Prix	1:40.380	1:47.406	(Japan) Kamui Kobayashi	(Malaysia) Caterham	1:49.625	109.210	Yes
2015	Malaysian Grand Prix	1:39.269	1:46.217	(Spain) Roberto Merhi	(United Kingdom) Marussia	1:46.677	107.462	Yes
2015	Japanese Grand Prix	1:33.015	1:39.386	(United States) Alexander Rossi	(United Kingdom) Marussia	1:47.114	115.158	Yes
2015	United States Grand Prix	1:56:495	2:04.650	(Spain) Carlos Sainz Jr.	(Italy) Toro Rosso	2:07.304	109.279	Yes
2016	Monaco Grand Prix	1:14.912	1:19.832	(Netherlands) Max Verstappen	(Austria) Red Bull	1:22.467	110.085	Yes
2016	Hungarian Grand Prix	1:33.302	1:39.833	(Australia) Daniel Ricciardo	(Austria) Red Bull	1:39.968	107.145	Yes
2016	Hungarian Grand Prix	1:33.302	1:39.833	(Netherlands) Max Verstappen	(Austria) Red Bull	1:40.424	107.663	Yes
2016	Hungarian Grand Prix	1:33.302	1:39.833	(Mexico) Sergio Pérez	Force India	1:41.411	108.691	Yes
2016	Hungarian Grand Prix	1:33.302	1:39.833	(Germany) Nico Hülkenberg	Force India	1:41.471	108.755	Yes
2016	Hungarian Grand Prix	1:33.302	1:39.833	(Finland) Valtteri Bottas	(United Kingdom) Williams	1:42.758	110.135	Yes
2016	Hungarian Grand Prix	1:33.302	1:39.833	(United Kingdom) Jolyon Palmer	(France) Renault	1:43.965	111.428	Yes
2016	Hungarian Grand Prix	1:33.302	1:39.833	(Brazil) Felipe Massa	(United Kingdom) Williams	1:43.999	111.465	Yes
2016	Hungarian Grand Prix	1:33.302	1:39.833	(Denmark) Kevin Magnussen	(France) Renault	1:44.543	112.048	Yes
2016	Hungarian Grand Prix	1:33.302	1:39.833	(Sweden) Marcus Ericsson	(Switzerland) Sauber	1:46.984	114.664	Yes
2016	Hungarian Grand Prix	1:33.302	1:39.833	(Germany) Pascal Wehrlein	(United Kingdom) Manor	1:47.343	115.049	Yes
2016	Hungarian Grand Prix	1:33.302	1:39.833	(Indonesia) Rio Haryanto	(United Kingdom) Manor	1:50.189	118.099	Yes
2017	Italian Grand Prix	1:35.716	1:42.416	(France) Romain Grosjean	(United States) Haas	1:43.355	107.226	Yes
2018	Azerbaijan Grand Prix	1:42.538	1:49.715	(New Zealand) Brendon Hartley	(Italy) Toro Rosso	1:57.354	114.449	Yes
2021	French Grand Prix	1:31.001	1:37.371	(Canada) Lance Stroll	(United Kingdom) Aston Martin	2:12.584	145.695	Yes
2023	Saudi Arabian Grand Prix	1:28.761	1:34.974	(United States) Logan Sargeant	(United Kingdom) Williams	2:08.510	144.782	Yes
2023	Azerbaijan Grand Prix	1:41.269	1:48.357	(Netherlands) Nyck de Vries	(Italy) AlphaTauri	1:55.282	113.837	Yes
2023	Qatar Grand Prix sprint	1:24.454	1:30.366	(United States) Logan Sargeant	(United Kingdom) Williams	2:05.741	137.586	Yes
2026	Las Vegas Grand Prix	1:34.664	1:41.290	(United Kingdom) Oliver Bearman	(United States) Haas	1:48.005	114.093	Yes

== Use in other racing series ==
The 107% rule, or variations thereof, has also been used in other motorsport series.

=== Formula E ===
Formula E applies an alternative 110% rule in qualifying. Race stewards have discretion to allow drivers who broke the rule to partake in the race, usually by looking at the times posted in free practice sessions. The rule is most commonly broken when a driver fails to enter his qualifying lap in time or has had his qualifying lap invalidated (therefore only his entry lap is recorded). The car breaking down or a crash during the session could also lead to a violation of this rule. There has been no occasion where a driver was not allowed to compete in the race so far.

=== GP2 and F2 Series ===
The 107% rule is also used in the GP2 Series as well as its successor Formula 2, where it has been applied on four occasions. Marcos Martínez failed to qualify for his debut race meeting at the Hungaroring in 2007 after failing to set a lap time due to engine problems, despite lapping within 107% of the fastest time in free practice. At the Monaco round of the 2009 season, Ricardo Teixeira failed to lap within 107% of the pole position time and was not allowed to take part in the races. During qualifying for the round of the championship held at the Hungaroring later that year, Romain Grosjean and Franck Perera collided before either had set a representative lap time: Perera was judged guilty of impeding and was barred from taking part in the first race, but allowed to start from the back of the grid in the second; Grosjean was given dispensation to start both races. Perera also failed to qualify for the Spa-Francorchamps races under the 107% criteria.

Alessio Deledda became the first driver since Perera in this racing category to fall victim to the 107% rule. He qualified 6.341 seconds off from the fastest time set by Robert Shwartzman in his group during qualifying for the Monaco Grand Prix round in 2021. As he was 7.314 seconds off the fastest time set by Shwartzman during the practice session, he was unable to take part in all three races in the weekend. He was, however, given permission to start by the stewards, after it was later revealed after the weekend that Deledda's car had mechanical problems and that he was within the 107% time during the previous round at Bahrain. In the following year's running of the same event, Richard Verschoor became the latest driver to fall foul of the rule when he failed to set a representative time within 107% time due to ongoing electrical issues, and the premature ending of the qualifying session due to an accident from Jake Hughes denying him from setting a time, but was again given permission to start both races by the stewards.

=== GP3 and F3 Series ===
The 107% rule is also used in the GP3 Series and the succeeding Formula 3. So far, the rule has only been in effect on one occasion during the GP3 era. In the 2012 Silverstone round, Carmen Jordá failed to set a lap time within 107% of the pole time. As she was also outside 107% of the fastest time in the practice session, she was not allowed to start the race.

After a 10-year absence, Zdeněk Chovanec became the first driver in the F3 era to fall foul of the rule, qualifying about 8 seconds off pole position time at Austria, but he was allowed to start both sprint and feature races, as his lap time from the free practice session was sufficient for him to participate.

=== MotoGP ===
MotoGP uses a similar rule for race competition, where riders must be within 105% of the lap times of the fastest rider in each of the practice sessions in order to take part in qualifying sessions. Between 2013 and 2021, the 107% rule was also used in the competition. Riders including Aleix Espargaro and Cal Crutchlow criticized about the effectiveness of the rule when Christophe Ponsson finished one lap slower than the race winner in 2018 San Marino Grand Prix, urging the FIM to tighten the rule.

Japanese rider Takumi Takahashi, who won Suzuka 8 Hours in 2010, failed to qualify in 2023 San Marino motorcycle Grand Prix after running 0.6 slower than the 105% of the fastest lap time in practice sessions.

=== IndyCar ===
The IndyCar Series uses a similar rule for race competition, where cars must be within 105% of the lap times of the fastest car.

=== NASCAR ===
NASCAR uses a similar rule for race competition, where cars must be within 115% of the fastest lap set in the final practice.

=== Super GT ===
In Super GT series, a slightly different 107% rule is being used. Until 2024, the base time is calculated by the mean time of top three cars within a class rather than the fastest lap time by a single car in that class. All drivers in the non-seeded teams must set a lap time within this time in order to qualify for the race. However, teams which could not qualify in official qualifying sessions may still be allowed to retry in following day's practice session, providing reasons such as accidents. In this case, the 107% of top three cars in practice session's will be used instead, in return, teams will start at the back of the grid. In races using the knockout format, a separate qualifying session will be launched prior the knockout qualifying to decide teams which are allowed to take part in the race. From 2024, this was removed from Q1 lap times and only applied to Q2 laps.

Another major difference of the 107% rule in Super GT is that there is a protection system called "seeded teams", which is awarded to each team which participated in all races and finished within the top 12 of its class in the previous season. These teams, provided they meet other entrance requirements, are allowed to participate in all races even when they fail to meet the qualifying time in official qualifying sessions. A team's "seeded team" status is forfeited when the team switches class or withdraws from the series, and the void caused by this will not be filled in by other teams.

=== Rally raid ===
The World Rally-Raid Championship used a 107% rule to set the starting lineup for the first stage of a given rally. If a driver regardless of category set a time within 107% of the prologue's winner, they were to start ahead of those with slower times for the next day. This percentage expanded to 115% for drivers with a gold or platinum FIA Driver Categorisation.

In mid-2026, the percentage was increased to 117%.
