= 1998 Monaco Grand Prix =

Coordinates: 43°44′4.74″N 7°25′16.8″E

Race 6 of 16 in the 1998 Formula One World Championship
← Previous race	Next race →

Race details
- Date: 24 May 1998
- Official name: Grand Prix de Monaco
- Location: Circuit de Monaco, Monte Carlo
- Course: Street circuit
- Course length: 3.367 km (2.092 miles)
- Distance: 78 laps, 262.626 km (163.188 miles)
- Weather: Hot and sunny with temperatures reaching up to 22 °C (72 °F)

Pole position
Driver	(Finland) Mika Häkkinen	McLaren-Mercedes
- Time: 1:19.798

Fastest lap
Driver	(Finland) Mika Häkkinen	McLaren-Mercedes
- Time: 1:22.948 on lap 29

Podium
First	(Finland) Mika Häkkinen	McLaren-Mercedes
Second	(Italy) Giancarlo Fisichella	Benetton-Playlife
Third	(United Kingdom) Eddie Irvine	Ferrari

The 1998 Monaco Grand Prix was a Formula One motor race held at Monaco on 24 May 1998. It was the sixth race of the 1998 Formula One World Championship.

The 78-lap race was won by Finnish driver Mika Häkkinen, driving a McLaren-Mercedes, his fourth win of the season. Häkkinen recorded a grand chelem, having taken pole position, led every lap of the race and set the fastest lap. Italian Giancarlo Fisichella finished second in a Benetton-Playlife, with Northern Irishman Eddie Irvine third in a Ferrari. This would be the last grand chelem by a McLaren driver until 27 years later, when Oscar Piastri achieved the same feat at the 2025 Dutch Grand Prix.

== Qualifying ==
=== Qualifying report ===
Qualifying saw Mika Häkkinen take his fourth pole position of the season by 0.339 seconds from McLaren teammate David Coulthard. In a surprise, Giancarlo Fisichella took third in his Benetton, over half a second behind Häkkinen but over three-tenths ahead of Michael Schumacher's Ferrari in fourth. Heinz-Harald Frentzen was fifth in the Williams; his teammate, reigning World Champion Jacques Villeneuve, could only manage 13th. The top ten was completed by Alexander Wurz in the second Benetton, Eddie Irvine in the second Ferrari, Mika Salo in the Arrows, Johnny Herbert in the Sauber and Jarno Trulli in the Prost. After a series of incidents in his Tyrrell, Ricardo Rosset failed to set a time within 107% of Häkkinen's pole time and so did not qualify for the race.

=== Qualifying classification ===
Pos	No	Driver	Constructor	Lap Time	Gap
1	8	(Finland) Mika Häkkinen	McLaren-Mercedes	1:19.798	
2	7	(United Kingdom) David Coulthard	McLaren-Mercedes	1:20.137	+0.339
3	5	(Italy) Giancarlo Fisichella	Benetton-Playlife	1:20.368	+0.570
4	3	(Germany) Michael Schumacher	Ferrari	1:20.702	+0.904
5	2	(Germany) Heinz-Harald Frentzen	Williams-Mecachrome	1:20.729	+0.931
6	6	(Austria) Alexander Wurz	Benetton-Playlife	1:20.955	+1.157
7	4	(United Kingdom) Eddie Irvine	Ferrari	1:21.712	+1.914
8	17	(Finland) Mika Salo	Arrows	1:22.144	+2.346
9	15	(United Kingdom) Johnny Herbert	Sauber-Petronas	1:22.157	+2.359
10	12	(Italy) Jarno Trulli	Prost-Peugeot	1:22.238	+2.440
11	14	(France) Jean Alesi	Sauber-Petronas	1:22.257	+2.459
12	16	(Brazil) Pedro Diniz	Arrows	1:22.355	+2.557
13	1	(Canada) Jacques Villeneuve	Williams-Mecachrome	1:22.468	+2.670
14	18	(Brazil) Rubens Barrichello	Stewart-Ford	1:22.540	+2.742
15	9	(United Kingdom) Damon Hill	Jordan-Mugen-Honda	1:23.151	+3.353
16	10	(Germany) Ralf Schumacher	Jordan-Mugen-Honda	1:23.263	+3.465
17	19	(Denmark) Jan Magnussen	Stewart-Ford	1:23.411	+3.613
18	11	(France) Olivier Panis	Prost-Peugeot	1:23.536	+3.738
19	22	(Japan) Shinji Nakano	Minardi-Ford	1:23.957	+4.159
20	21	(Japan) Toranosuke Takagi	Tyrrell-Ford	1:24.024	+4.226
21	23	(Argentina) Esteban Tuero	Minardi-Ford	1:24.031	+4.233
107% time: 1:25.383
DNQ	20	(Brazil) Ricardo Rosset	Tyrrell-Ford	1:25.737	+5.939

== Race ==
=== Race report ===
A perfect start from both McLarens saw them lead through the first corner, with Häkkinen ahead of Coulthard, followed by Fisichella and Michael Schumacher. Esteban Tuero became the first retirement when he ran wide at Massenet in his Minardi and hit the armco barrier. In the early stages the McLarens pulled ahead, netting 12 fastest laps between them from laps 4 to 12. On lap 10, Frentzen and Irvine collided at the Loews hairpin; Frentzen retired but Irvine was able to continue. Rubens Barrichello dropped out on lap 12 with a suspension failure in his Stewart; his teammate Jan Magnussen suffered the same problem shortly before half distance. On lap 18, Coulthard's engine blew, promoting Fisichella to second.

Michael Schumacher was first to pit for fuel on lap 30. Fisichella pitted the following lap, coming out of the pits behind the Ferrari. Soon Michael came up behind Fisichella's teammate, Wurz, and tried to get past. At the Loews hairpin, Michael went down the inside but Wurz did not give way. The two cars touched and the Ferrari was damaged. Michael pitted for repairs, eventually coming out three laps down on Häkkinen. Wurz appeared unaffected, but on lap 43 his suspension broke due to damage from the collision and he had a huge accident coming out of the tunnel, finally stopping at the Nouvelle Chicane.

Ralf Schumacher suffered a suspension failure in his Jordan on lap 45, before the two Prosts retired within seven laps of each other, Olivier Panis with wheel problems on lap 50 and Trulli with a gearbox failure on lap 57. By this point, Salo had moved up to fourth behind Häkkinen, Fisichella and Irvine, with Jean Alesi fifth in the Sauber and Villeneuve sixth. On lap 73, Alesi's gearbox failed, promoting Pedro Diniz in the second Arrows to sixth, just ahead of the recovering Michael Schumacher. Attempting to overtake Diniz at the Nouvelle Chicane on the final lap, Michael lost control and hit the back of the Arrows, losing his front wing; he ended up finishing tenth, two laps down.

Häkkinen's final margin of victory over Fisichella was 11.4 seconds, with another 30 seconds back to Irvine and a further 19 to Salo, the last driver on the lead lap. Villeneuve was fifth with Diniz holding on to sixth.

=== Race classification ===
Pos	No	Driver	Constructor	Laps	Time/Retired	Grid	Points
1	8	(Finland) Mika Häkkinen	McLaren-Mercedes	78	1:51:23.595	1	10
2	5	(Italy) Giancarlo Fisichella	Benetton-Playlife	78	+ 11.475	3	6
3	4	(United Kingdom) Eddie Irvine	Ferrari	78	+ 41.378	7	4
4	17	(Finland) Mika Salo	Arrows	78	+ 1:00.363	8	3
5	1	(Canada) Jacques Villeneuve	Williams-Mecachrome	77	+ 1 lap	13	2
6	16	(Brazil) Pedro Diniz	Arrows	77	+ 1 lap	12	1
7	15	(United Kingdom) Johnny Herbert	Sauber-Petronas	77	+ 1 lap	9	
8	9	(United Kingdom) Damon Hill	Jordan-Mugen-Honda	76	+ 2 laps	15	
9	22	(Japan) Shinji Nakano	Minardi-Ford	76	+ 2 laps	19	
10	3	(Germany) Michael Schumacher	Ferrari	76	+ 2 laps	4	
11	21	(Japan) Toranosuke Takagi	Tyrrell-Ford	76	+ 2 laps	20	
12	14	(France) Jean Alesi	Sauber-Petronas	72	Gearbox	11	
Ret	12	(Italy) Jarno Trulli	Prost-Peugeot	56	Gearbox	10	
Ret	11	(France) Olivier Panis	Prost-Peugeot	49	Wheel	18	
Ret	10	(Germany) Ralf Schumacher	Jordan-Mugen-Honda	44	Suspension	16	
Ret	6	(Austria) Alexander Wurz	Benetton-Playlife	42	Accident damage	6	
Ret	19	(Denmark) Jan Magnussen	Stewart-Ford	30	Suspension	17	
Ret	7	(United Kingdom) David Coulthard	McLaren-Mercedes	17	Engine	2	
Ret	18	(Brazil) Rubens Barrichello	Stewart-Ford	11	Suspension	14	
Ret	2	(Germany) Heinz-Harald Frentzen	Williams-Mecachrome	9	Collision	5	
Ret	23	(Argentina) Esteban Tuero	Minardi-Ford	0	Spun off	21	
DNQ	20	(Brazil) Ricardo Rosset	Tyrrell-Ford		107% rule		

== Championship standings after the race ==
Drivers' Championship standings

Pos	Driver	Points
1	(Finland) Mika Häkkinen	46
2	(United Kingdom) David Coulthard	29
3	(Germany) Michael Schumacher	24
4	(United Kingdom) Eddie Irvine	15
5	(Austria) Alexander Wurz	9

Constructors' Championship standings

Pos	Constructor	Points
1	(United Kingdom) McLaren-Mercedes	75
2	(Italy) Ferrari	39
3	(United Kingdom) Williams-Mecachrome	16
4	(Italy) Benetton-Playlife	16
5	(United Kingdom) Arrows	4

- Note: Only the top five positions are included for both sets of standings.

Previous race: 1998 Spanish Grand Prix	FIA Formula One World Championship; 1998 season	Next race: 1998 Canadian Grand Prix
Previous race: 1997 Monaco Grand Prix	Monaco Grand Prix	Next race: 1999 Monaco Grand Prix
