= Lola B10/30 =

- Category: Formula One
- Constructor: Lola
- Predecessor: T97/30 (1997)

Technical specifications
- Engine: Cosworth CA 2011 (probable) 2,399cc V8 Naturally Aspirated
- Transmission: 7 Speed Semi Automatic (probable)
- Power: <750 bhp
- Tyres: Pirelli

Competition history
Races	Wins	Poles	F/Laps
0	0	0	0
- Constructors' Championships: 0
- Drivers' Championships: 0

Lola B10/30 (also known as the Lola MB-01) is a Formula 1 car built by Lola Cars, which was to be used in the 2010 and then 2011 seasons. It never took part in a race.

== History ==
In 2009 the Lola Cars team was registered to participate in the 2010 season, but its application was rejected and its place was taken by the US F1 Team, Campos Meta Team and Manor Grand Prix. Lola Cars revealed its car design in September 2009 on the occasion of the Silverstone 1000km, during an open day at the Huntingdon factory. Due to the rejection of the application for 2010, Lola prepared the car for the 2011 season. His 50% scale model was tested for 10 days in a wind tunnel. The car was to use the Cosworth CA-V8 engine. Some of its elements look uncomplicated, including: front wing.
