= Vincenzo Sospiri =

Italian racing driver (born 1966)

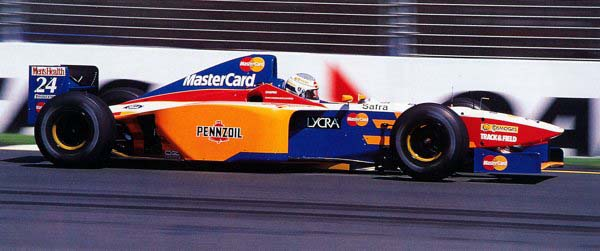
- Sospiri driving for MasterCard Lola at the 1997 Australian Grand Prix
- Born: 9 October 1966 (age 60); Forlì, Italy

Formula One World Championship career
- Nationality: (Italy) Italian
- Active years: 1997
- Team: Lola
- Entries: 1 (0 starts)
- Championships: 0
- Wins: 0
- Podiums: 0
- Career points: 0
- Pole positions: 0
- Fastest laps: 0
- First entry: 1997 Australian Grand Prix

Vincenzo Sospiri (born 7 October 1966) is an Italian former racing driver and team owner.

== Early career ==
Sospiri driving for David Sears Racing at Imola for the 1990 Formula Opel Euroseries

In 1981, at the age of fifteen, Sospiri started racing in the Italian 100cc karting Championship. In a karting career described by Michael Schumacher as 'dominating', Sospiri won several Italian and European karting championships and finished runner-up in several more, eventually winning the 100cc World Karting Championship in 1987.

In 1988, Sospiri progressed to Formula Ford, winning the Formula Ford Festival, before working through to Formula 3000 in 1991, as teammate to Damon Hill in the Middlebridge Lola T91/50 Cosworth. In an uncompetitive car, he was only capable of nine points all season, including a second place at the German round of the championship at the Hockenheimring. He stepped back down into the Italian F3 series in 1992, before making a return to Formula 3000 in 1993, driving a Reynard 93D Judd for the Mythos team. He moved to the Super Nova team for 1994 and mounted a challenge for the championship despite not winning any races, eventually finishing fourth. He stayed at Super Nova for 1995 where he won three races and beat his teammate Ricardo Rosset to the F3000 title.

Sospiri revealed, in a 2022 YouTube interview with a fan, that his biggest heroes in racing were Ayrton Senna and Dan Gurney, for whom he would later drive.

== Formula One ==
=== Simtek test and Benetton test driver (1994-96) ===
Sospiri had tested for the Simtek Formula One team at Estoril in 1994, but was unable to raise enough funds to gain a race seat at the time. Despite winning the Formula 3000 title in 1995, very few options were available for Sospiri, so he chose to take the role of official Benetton test driver for the year.

=== Lola (1997) ===
Sospiri finally got his chance to race in Formula One with the MasterCard Lola project in 1997. Unfortunately it was clear from the first race, where both Sospiri and his former F3000 teammate Ricardo Rosset were more than ten seconds off the pace and failed to qualify after being well outside the 107% rule, that the car was not capable of making the grid in a world championship race. Sospiri hoped to return to the grid in Brazil, but the team was withdrawn due to the massive debts incurred by its failing Formula One effort.

In a 2021 interview with motorsport website The Race mainly about his 1997 racing season, Sospiri gave insight into his very brief stint as an official race driver with Lola, including how he was initially unaware of the team withdrawing from the second race of 1997 at the Brazilian Grand Prix. Of his Lola experience, Sospiri said:

Vincenzo Sospiri: "Like many drivers, my dream was to become a Formula 1 driver. We did everything we could with the budget we had, and we never had enough money to be fair. That was always the target and finally seeing the dream being realised was an incredible feeling, even though that the reality was not what was promised on paper. I had the opportunity to stay with Benetton for 1997 as a test driver but I wanted a race seat, and I had this offer from [Lola backer] MasterCard to sign for four seasons. I was optimistic about 1997 and what Lola was delivering, because back then Lola was an historic name, the number one brand in motorsport and they decided to go into F1 as a team. So I thought it was very promising. They showed me on a piece of paper, they had this sponsor and this sponsor, a lot of backing. They told me that the first year would be hard because we went in with a very old engine, it was a Ford V8 engine and they didn't want to invest so much money before the rules change in 1998. So, everything on paper was brilliant. We did a test at Silverstone where my car caught fire as I came out of the pits, it just caught fire. So, I couldn't do the rest of the day. And then the day after, I only manage about nine laps, just out laps and in laps. [Team-mate] Ricardo [Rosset] did about 20 or 30 laps the first day and then another 20 or 30 laps on the second day, so we really didn't know the car well at all. But it was OK, we knew the situation, we knew that it would be hard the first year, that the car hadn't been built with any windtunnel. We all knew the car wasn't brilliant, but it was no problem because we had to learn all these things as a racing driver. I was planning to be better for the second year. We knew we weren't competitive, but we didn't know it would be that bad. The car's pace was probably the same or a little bit worse than a Formula 3000 car, but I didn't care, I accepted it as part of the learning process. I didn't expect the dream to be over by the second round. There was a lot of pressure from the sponsors, so they decided to bring everything forward. That's what they told me anyway. They didn't have time to do it correctly, and by doing everything one year early, that's probably what caused the project to fail. The deals with the sponsors were also not closed properly and then everything went bust. I didn't even know the team was closing down until I read about it in the newspapers. We had the car out in front of the garage on Wednesday morning, I thought, for a big conference to present the car for the future and so on. It was a horrible way to find out, I didn't even get a phone call. [The Lola drive] was a great opportunity, I had always dreamt of getting to F1 in a race seat and I didn't want to be a test driver for another year. It was the right decision because it was an F1 seat.”

— Excerpts from Sospiri's 2021 Interview with motorsport website The Race mainly relating to his racing 1997 season.

== After Formula One ==
=== IndyCar and Champ Car ===
After the collapse of Mastercard-Lola, Sospiri turned his attention to the Indy Racing League IndyCar Series where he signed on with Team Scandia to race in the 1997 Indianapolis 500. Sospiri put the Scandia Dallara-Oldsmobile third on the starting grid in his first IndyCar start and finished seventeenth in the race. Later that season, he finished second at the New Hampshire Motor Speedway. He finished 21st in the championship despite only competing in six of the ten races of the 1996-1997 season. In 1998, Sospiri was brought on to Dan Gurney's All American Racers team as a late-season replacement for P. J. Jones and drove in the final four races of the season for the team. He had a best finish of 15th at both Houston and Surfers Paradise and failed to finish in the points as the team's struggles continued. He was named to an ISM Racing entry for the 1999 Indianapolis 500, but the car was driven by Brian Tyler instead, who failed to qualify.

=== Sports cars and team ownership ===
The Toyota GT-One driven by Sospiri, Emmanuel Collard and Martin Brundle at the 1999 24 Hours of Le Mans

In 1998 and 1999, Sospiri won the Sports Racing World Cup with a Ferrari 333 SP, teaming up with Emmanuel Collard. This resulted in a drive in the lead Toyota at the 1999 24 Hours of Le Mans with Collard and Martin Brundle. Unfortunately, frequent gearbox problems and a puncture while Brundle was driving took the polesitter out of the race. He retired from racing in 2001 and is now the team manager for Vincenzo Sospiri Racing.

=== Legacy ===
Sospiri was a major inspiration for Michael Schumacher. In a Q&A session with F1 Racing readers in 2012, when asked about his racing heroes, Schumacher replied: "To start with, it was Vincenzo Sospiri. Then it was Ayrton Senna. Those two guys inspired me big time while I was karting".

== Racing record ==
=== Complete International Formula 3000 results ===
(key) (Races in bold indicate pole position) (Races in italics indicate fastest lap)

Year	Entrant	1	2	3	4	5	6	7	8	9	10	11	DC	Points
1990	Eddie Jordan Racing	DON	SIL	PAU	JER; 8	MNZ	PER	HOC	BRH	BIR	BUG	NOG; DNQ	NC	0
1991	Eddie Jordan Racing	VAL; Ret	PAU; DNQ	JER; 15	MUG; 4	PER; Ret	HOC; 2	BRH; 16	SPA; 10	BUG; Ret	NOG; 13		8th	9
1993	Mythos Racing	DON; Ret	SIL; Ret	PAU; 6	PER; 2	HOC; 3	NÜR; 6	SPA; 5	MAG; 5	NOG; Ret			7th	16
1994	Super Nova Racing	SIL; 4	PAU; 2	CAT; 3	PER; Ret	HOC; 4	SPA; Ret	EST; 2	MAG; 5				4th	24
1995	Super Nova Racing	SIL; 2	CAT; 1	PAU; 1	PER; 2	HOC; Ret	SPA; 1	EST; 7	MAG; 4				**1st**	**42**

=== Complete Formula One results ===
(key)

Year	Entrant	Chassis	Engine	1	2	3	4	5	6	7	8	9	10	11	12	13	14	15	16	17	WDC	Points
1997	Mastercard Lola F1 Team	Lola T97/30	Ford V8	AUS; DNQ	BRA	ARG	SMR	MON	ESP	CAN	FRA	GBR	GER	HUN	BEL	ITA	AUT	LUX	JPN	EUR	NC	0

=== Complete Formula Nippon results ===
(key) (Races in bold indicate pole position) (Races in italics indicate fastest lap)

Year	Entrant	1	2	3	4	5	6	7	8	9	10	DC	Points
1997	Mirai	SUZ	MIN	FUJ	SUZ	SUG	FUJ	MIN	MOT	FUJ; Ret	SUZ; 15	34th	0

=== American open-wheel racing results ===
(key) (Races in bold indicate pole position)

==== IndyCar ====
Year	Team	Chassis	No.	Engine	1	2	3	4	5	6	7	8	9	10	Rank	Points	Ref
1996–97	Team Scandia	Dallara IR7	8	Oldsmobile	NWH	LSV	WDW	PHX	INDY; 17	TXS; 9					21st	134	
1996–97	Team Scandia	Dallara IR7	22	Oldsmobile							PPIR; 6	CLT; 20	NH2; 2	LV2; 22	21st	134	

==== Indy 500 results ====
Year	Chassis	Engine	Start	Finish	Team
1997	Dallara	Oldsmobile	3	17	Scandia

==== CART ====
Year	Team	No.	Car	Engine	Tyres	1	2	3	4	5	6	7	8	9	10	11	12	13	14	15	16	17	18	19	Rank	Points	Ref
1998	All American Racers	98	Eagle 987	Toyota RV8C	G	MIA	MOT	LBH	NZR	RIO	STL	MIL	DET	POR	CLE	TOR	MIS	MDO	ROA	VAN	LS; 22	HOU; 15	SRF; 15	FON; 23	**29th**	**0**	

=== Complete 24 Hours of Le Mans results ===
Year	Class	No	Tyres	Car	Team	Co-Drivers	Laps	Pos.	Class Pos.
1998	LMP1	5	**M**	Ferrari 333 SP; Ferrari F310E 4.0L V12	(France) JB Racing	(France) Jean-Christophe Boullion (France) Jérôme Policand	187	DNF	DNF
1999	LMGTP	1	**M**	Toyota GT-One; Toyota R36V 3.6L Turbo V8	(Japan) Toyota Motorsports (Germany) Toyota Team Europe	(United Kingdom) Martin Brundle (France) Emmanuel Collard	90	DNF	DNF

Sporting positions
Preceded by Eddie Irvine	Formula Ford Festival Winner; 1988	Succeeded by Niko Palhares
Preceded by Jean-Christophe Boullion	International Formula 3000 Champion; 1995	Succeeded by Jörg Müller
