= MasterCard Lola =

Defunct racing team

Lola
- Full name: MasterCard Lola; Formula One Racing Team
- Base: Huntingdon, United Kingdom
- Founder(s): Eric Broadley
- Noted drivers: (Italy) Vincenzo Sospiri (Brazil) Ricardo Rosset

Formula One World Championship career
- First entry: 1997 Australian Grand Prix
- Races entered: 1 (0 starts)
- Engines: Ford
- Constructors' Championships: 0
- Drivers' Championships: 0
- Race victories: 0
- Pole positions: 0
- Fastest laps: 0
- Final entry: 1997 Australian Grand Prix (Did not Qualify)

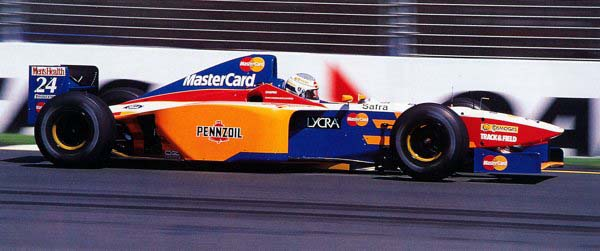
Vincenzo Sospiri (pictured) and Ricardo Rosset both failed to qualify for the 1997 Australian Grand Prix.

The MasterCard Lola Formula One Racing Team, often known as MasterCard Lola or simply Lola, was a British Formula One team that contested only one race in the 1997 Formula One World Championship. It quickly withdrew from the sport after failing to qualify on its debut at the 1997 Australian Grand Prix, where the cars were more than 11 seconds off the pace in qualifying. Just days after the team's first qualifying attempt and leaving behind a reported US$9.7 million in debt before the next round in Brazil, it was considered not just one of the worst ever teams in Formula One, but, as of 2026, the shortest-lived team in Formula One history.

== Competition history ==
=== Team beginnings and aspirations ===
After years of providing chassis to other teams such as Larrousse and Scuderia Italia, team principal Eric Broadley planned a team that would compete solely under Lola ownership. A prototype chassis was first tested in late 1994 and early 1995 with Allan McNish and in late 1996 Broadley announced the team's participation in the near future. The team had originally intended to enter F1 in 1998 when the regulations on car designs were set to be overhauled, but entered a year early in 1997. In a 2008 interview with Motor Sport, Broadley said that this was due to commercial pressures from the team's sponsors, primarily from title sponsor, MasterCard. This was due to MasterCard's ardour to launch its "F1 Club" for card holders to provide funding to Lola. Lola founder and designer Eric Broadley stated in late January/early February 1997 that the target of Huntington-based team for the 1997 season was for Lola to be ahead of the other new Formula One team entrant for 1997-Stewart Grand Prix, with Broadley also citing Arrows, who had signed then-reigning champion Damon Hill for 1997 as a benchmark for Lola in their first season.

=== Technology of the T97/30 and car launch ===
The Lola chassis, dubbed the T97/30, was based on most of their CART technology yet never saw the inside of a wind tunnel and barely had on-track tests. This was mainly because the design of the engine fell behind schedule. The T97/30 designed by Broadley and Chris Saunders was launched at the Hilton Hotel in London on 20 February 1997. At the car launch Broadley stated the team aimed to win the World Championship within a four year period.

=== Unrealised Lola V10 engine and Ford-Cosworth V8 ===
The engine, the responsibility of Al Melling, was originally planned to be an in-house Lola V10, designed specifically to take into account the rear streamlining of the car and the underneath of the car in the area of the diffuser. However, the engine was not developed in time and Lola were compelled to use the underpowered and outdated Ford-Cosworth ECA Zetec-R V8 engine, the same specification V8 as used by the defunct Forti team in the 1996 season and Sauber in 1995.

=== Drivers and failure to qualify in Melbourne ===
Vincenzo Sospiri, an International Formula 3000 champion and Formula One test driver with Benetton, and Ricardo Rosset were signed to drive. By the time the car made it to the 1997 Australian Grand Prix, the team's failings were laid bare, with the cars bottom of the qualifying timesheets by a considerable margin. Under 1997 rules, drivers would only be allowed to start a race if they set a qualifying time within 107% of the pole position time or if under exceptional circumstances, they fail to qualify, their time in practice would be considered. At 11 and 13 seconds respectively, with the ageing Ford unit, Sospiri and Rosset were nowhere near achieving this. The cars were tested at Silverstone shortly after the Australian Grand Prix but both were again slowest with times in excess of 9 seconds off the front runners.

=== Withdrawal ===
On 26 March 1997, the Wednesday before the Brazilian Grand Prix, Lola announced it was withdrawing from the Brazil race due to "financial and technical problems". Lola's staff, who had already travelled to Interlagos, returned to the team's base in Huntingdon, England. Shortly afterwards, Lola withdrew from the World Championship outright.

In its short existence as a Formula One constructor, Lola had incurred £6 million in debt; the company went into receivership several weeks later. Irish entrepreneur Martin Birrane purchased the company and oversaw a revival in the company's fortunes; however, Lola has not been involved in Formula One in any capacity since. Rosset would go on to race for Tyrrell in 1998, but the promising Sospiri would never compete in Formula One again.

=== 2010 comeback attempt ===
On 22 April 2009, Lola announced its intention to launch a full scale works effort for the 2010 FIA Formula One World Championship. The team said that they had to re-examine their position after the plans to introduce a budget cap of £30million were raised to £40m but insisted it was "an opportunity not to be missed". However, on 17 June, Lola announced it had abandoned the plan after failing to secure a place on the initial 2010 entry list.

=== Legacy and retrospective ===
In a 2021 interview with motorsport website The Race, the former Mastercard Lola driver Vincenzo Sospiri said the following when talking about his brief experience of Formula One with the team, including about how he was not informed in advance of the team's withdrawal from the second round of the 1997 F1 season at the Brazilian Grand Prix and later the rest of the 1997 season:

Vincenzo Sospiri: "Like many drivers, my dream was to become a Formula 1 driver. We did everything we could with the budget we had, and we never had enough money to be fair. That was always the target and finally seeing the dream being realised was an incredible feeling, even though that the reality was not what was promised on paper. I had the opportunity to stay with Benetton for 1997 as a test driver but I wanted a race seat, and I had this offer from [Lola backer] MasterCard to sign for four seasons. I was optimistic about 1997 and what Lola was delivering, because back then Lola was an historic name, the number one brand in motorsport and they decided to go into F1 as a team. So I thought it was very promising. They showed me on a piece of paper, they had this sponsor and this sponsor, a lot of backing. They told me that the first year would be hard because we went in with a very old engine, it was a Ford V8 engine and they didn't want to invest so much money before the rules change in 1998. So, everything on paper was brilliant. We did a test at Silverstone where my car caught fire as I came out of the pits, it just caught fire. So, I couldn't do the rest of the day. And then the day after, I only manage about nine laps, just out laps and in laps. [Team-mate] Ricardo [Rosset] did about 20 or 30 laps the first day and then another 20 or 30 laps on the second day, so we really didn't know the car well at all. But it was OK, we knew the situation, we knew that it would be hard the first year, that the car hadn't been built with any windtunnel. We all knew the car wasn't brilliant, but it was no problem because we had to learn all these things as a racing driver. I was planning to be better for the second year. We knew we weren't competitive, but we didn't know it would be that bad. The car's pace was probably the same or a little bit worse than a Formula 3000 car, but I didn't care, I accepted it as part of the learning process. I didn't expect the dream to be over by the second round. There was a lot of pressure from the sponsors, so they decided to bring everything forward. That's what they told me anyway. They didn't have time to do it correctly, and by doing everything one year early, that's probably what caused the project to fail. The deals with the sponsors were also not closed properly and then everything went bust. I didn't even know the team was closing down until I read about it in the newspapers. We had the car out in front of the garage on Wednesday morning, I thought, for a big conference to present the car for the future and so on. It was a horrible way to find out, I didn't even get a phone call".

— Excerpts from Vincenzo Sospiri's 2021 Interview with The Race on his 1997 season.

Also in January 2021 Mastercard Lola was ranked third by Motorsport Week in their list of 'Formula 1's top 10 worst teams', behind only Life Racing Engines and Andrea Moda respectively.

== Complete Formula One results ==
(key)

Year	Chassis	Engine	Tyres	Drivers	1	2	3	4	5	6	7	8	9	10	11	12	13	14	15	16	17	Points	WCC
1997	T97/30	Ford ECA Zetec-R 3.0 V8	B		AUS	BRA	ARG	SMR	MON	ESP	CAN	FRA	GBR	GER	HUN	BEL	ITA	AUT	LUX	JPN	EUR	0	NC
1997	T97/30	Ford ECA Zetec-R 3.0 V8	B	(Italy) Vincenzo Sospiri	DNQ	WD																0	NC
1997	T97/30	Ford ECA Zetec-R 3.0 V8	B	(Brazil) Ricardo Rosset	DNQ	WD																0	NC
