= Lola T95/30 =

- Lola T95/30 F1 test car in 1996 driven by Allan McNish.
- Category: Formula One
- Constructor: Lola
- Designers: Julian Cooper; Chris Saunders
- Predecessor: Lola T93/30
- Successor: Lola T97/30

Technical specifications
- Engine: Ford
- Tyres: Goodyear

Competition history
- Notable entrants: Not entered
- Notable drivers: (United Kingdom) Allan McNish
- Debut: NA
Races	Wins	Poles	F/Laps
NA	NA	NA	NA
- Constructors' Championships: NA
- Drivers' Championships: NA

The Lola T95/30 (also known as the Lola T94/30) is a Formula One motor racing car which was tested by Allan McNish during 1994 and early 1995. The car, however, was not raced during any Formula One races. The car was designed as a prototype ready for Lola's arrival in Formula One. Lola, instead of actually racing the car in the season, chose instead to test the car while searching for a big-name sponsor as money for the project dried up. The T95/30 version could not be raced as it was made obsolete by regulation changes enforced by the Fédération Internationale de l'Automobile (FIA), Formula One's governing body.

The car was designed by Julian Cooper and Chris Saunders, who previously worked at Benetton and Williams respectively. The chassis was developed using the 40% scale windtunnel at Cranfield Institute. The T95/30 car was eventually sold as a collector's item after being displayed at the 1997 Autosport show.

The car was succeeded by the Lola T97/30, which the team used during their participation in the 1997 Formula One season.
