= Ricardo Rosset =

Brazilian racing driver (born 1968)

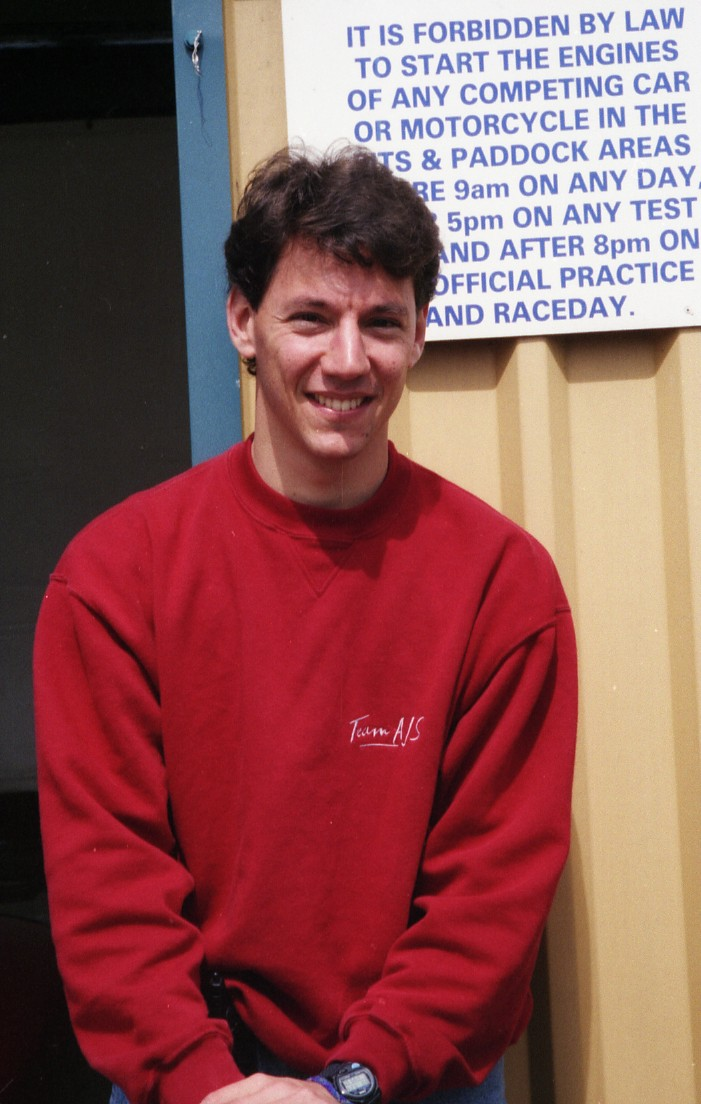
- Rosset at British F3 Donington Park event in 1994
- Born: 27 July 1968 (age 58); São Paulo, Brazil

Formula One World Championship career
- Nationality: (Brazil) Brazilian
- Active years: 1996–1998
- Team(s): Footwork, MasterCard Lola, Tyrrell
- Entries: 33 (26 starts)
- Championships: 0
- Wins: 0
- Podiums: 0
- Career points: 0
- Pole positions: 0
- Fastest laps: 0
- First entry: 1996 Australian Grand Prix
- Last entry: 1998 Japanese Grand Prix

Championship titles
- 2010, 2013, 2015: Porsche GT3 Cup Brasil

Ricardo Rosset (born 27 July 1968) is a Brazilian racing driver. Runner-up in the 1995 International Formula 3000 Championship, he later participated in 33 Formula One Grands Prix, making his debut at the 1996 Australian Grand Prix. He scored no championship points. He eventually quit Formula One to focus on developing a sportswear business in Brazil.

== Career ==
=== Formula Three ===
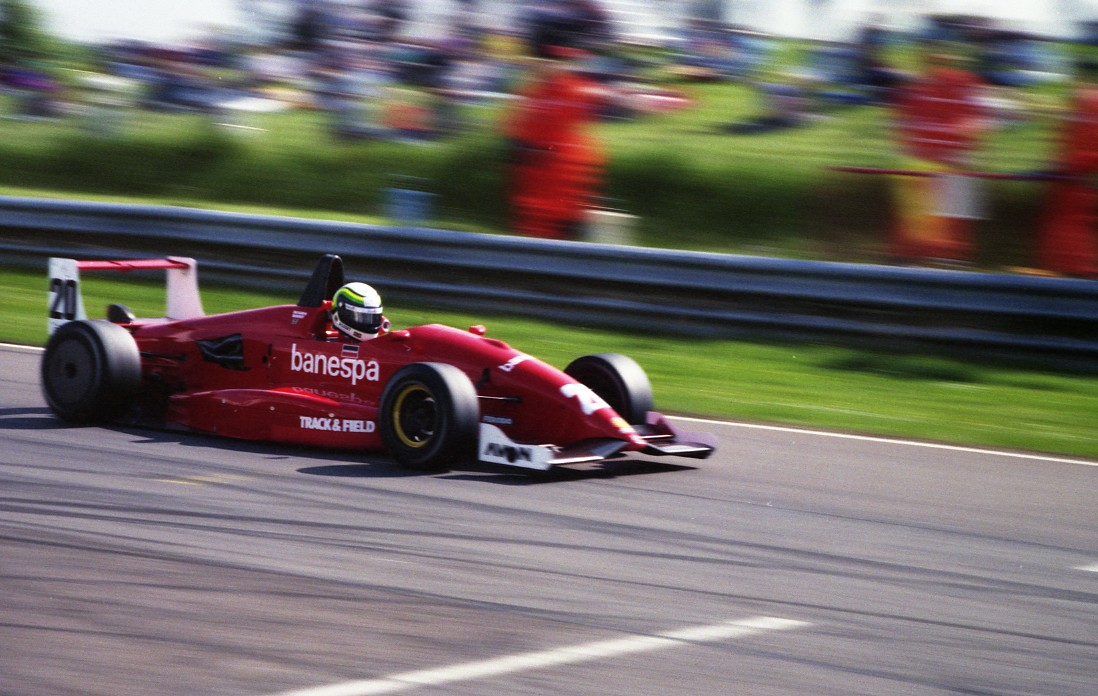
Ricardo Rosset at Thruxton British F3, 1994

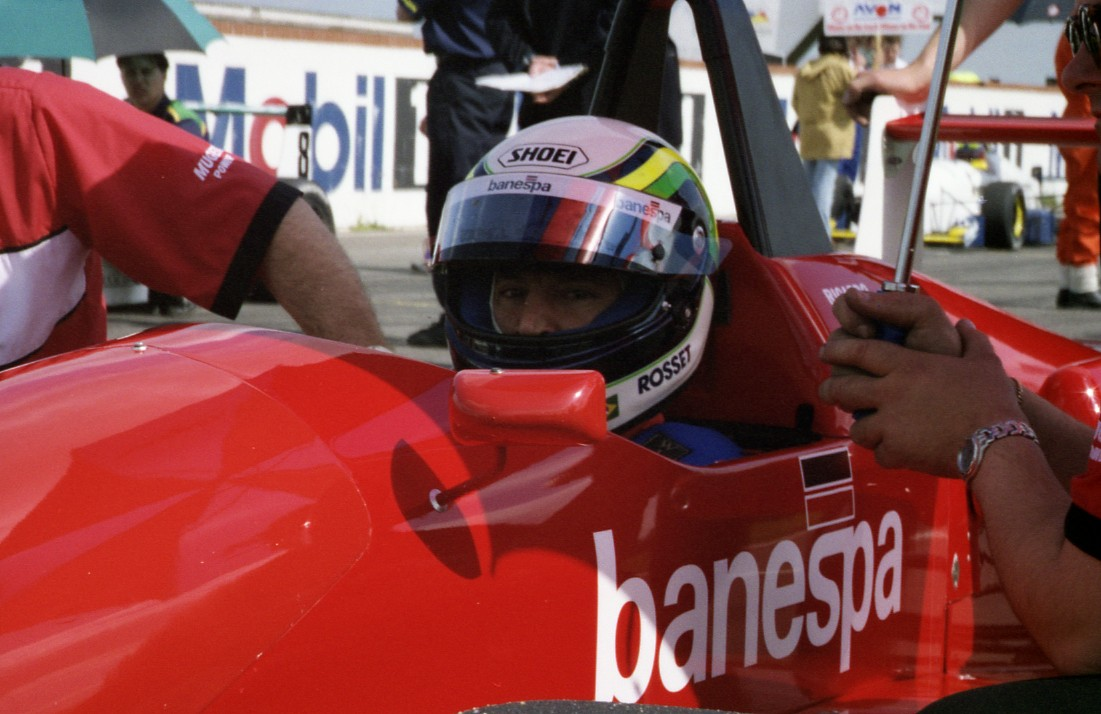
Ricardo Rosset on the grid, Thruxton British F3, 1994

After graduating from the Formula Opel Euroseries, Rosset competed in the British Formula 3 Championship in 1993 for Alan Docking Racing. He finished joint sixth in the standings, tied with Pedro de la Rosa, with his best finish being one second place at Silverstone. Rosset moved to the AJS team in 1994, and improved to fifth in the standings in a season dominated by Jan Magnussen. He won his first F3 race that year at Snetterton, albeit on an occasion where Magnussen retired.

=== Formula 3000 ===
Rosset made his début in International Formula 3000 with the Super Nova Racing team in 1995. His teammate was the more experienced Vincenzo Sospiri, who won the drivers' championship that year. In 1995, Rosset came second to his teammate – winning two races, including his first ever F3000 race – and finished second in the championship.

=== Formula One ===
==== Footwork (1996) ====
Although he had an opportunity to join Minardi, Rosset was hired by Footwork in 1996 as teammate to Jos Verstappen. He never matched the Dutch driver's pace (Verstappen was quicker in qualifying for all the races), although the team largely stopped development on the car when Tom Walkinshaw bought it. Rosset later stated that the cash-strapped team were unable to provide two identical cars, with a lack of spares, and they concentrated on the faster driver, Verstappen.

==== Lola (1997) ====
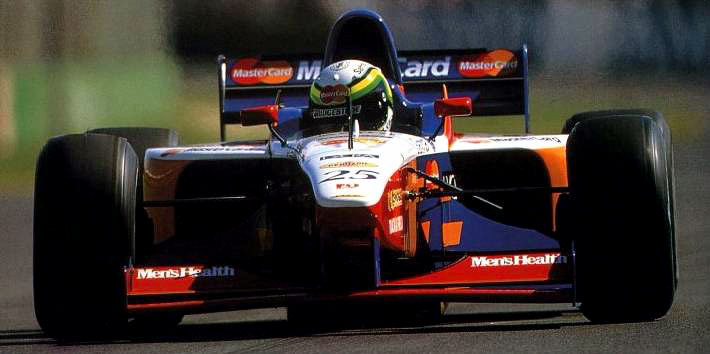
Rosset driving for Lola during the 1997 Australian Grand Prix meeting.

In 1997, Rosset's only option in Formula One was to join MasterCard Lola, where he was partnered with his former F3000 teammate Vincenzo Sospiri. However, the team pulled out of Formula One after one failure to qualify at the 1997 Australian Grand Prix due to an uncompetitive and underdeveloped car, the Lola T97/30, and a breakdown in sponsorship from MasterCard. Rosset was left without a drive for the rest of the season.

==== Tyrrell (1998) ====
In 1998, Rosset was chosen by Craig Pollock to be Tyrrell's second driver alongside Toranosuke Takagi, to the fury of Ken Tyrrell, whose first choice was Verstappen, although Rosset later stated Tyrrell's choice was Norberto Fontana. Pollock had bought into the team with a view to establishing BAR, and saw Rosset's superior sponsorship finance as essential in balancing the team's budget. The decision led to Tyrrell leaving the team midway through the season.

The 1998 season was another unsuccessful one for Rosset, and led to increasing criticism of his abilities. Failing to qualify at Monaco, he spun towards the end of the qualifying session, and embarrassingly beached his car on the kerb when he tried to spin the car round to the face in the right direction. When Murray Walker suggested that people were debating whether Rosset was F1 quality, co-commentator and ex-F1 driver Martin Brundle replied, "it's a fairly short debate, Murray". Rosset has countered the criticism against him, claiming that, for journalists, making a driver look stupid is more lucrative than discovering the truth. He blamed a worn clutch for the incident: "That's why it looks so bad... the clutch wasn't working." Even Rosset's own mechanics were critical of him: after he damaged his car in a collision with Jacques Villeneuve at Monaco and received a warning from the stewards, his mechanics switched the first and last letters of his surname on his paddock scooter to form the word "tosser". Rosset later said, "I never saw that. Maybe behind the scenes, the mechanics, they were saying that. I remember something like that... I don't doubt it."

Despite an eighth-place finish at the next race in Canada, which was ultimately the team's best result of the season, Rosset was in danger of losing his seat to Danish driver Tom Kristensen. At a test at Magny-Cours, Rosset and Takagi posted almost equal times, with Kristensen around half a second slower, albeit with an older engine. Rosset said in 2019 that Kristensen drove the same car as he did, with only a change of seat and minor adjustments. Rosset went on to outqualify Takagi at the following race at the same circuit, the French Grand Prix.

Rosset's problems included missing out on qualification for the Spanish Grand Prix by 0.06s, and an injury during practice for the German Grand Prix which prevented him from taking part in qualifying, while in Belgium he crashed into the carnage of the 14-car pile-up on the first lap after being unsighted by the heavy spray, and was unable to take the restart. A further failure to qualify at Tyrrell's final race in Japan, where he was hindered by a neck injury caused by a crash in practice, marked the end of his Formula One career.

Rosset later stated his belief that Tyrrell concentrated heavily on his Honda-backed teammate Takagi, and gave the Japanese driver an advantage in order to win favour from Honda. "They wanted him to look good... so I was somebody not very welcome," he said. "For sure, they weren't behind me."

=== After Formula One ===
After leaving the team at the end of the season, Rosset quit racing entirely to concentrate on his sportswear business in Brazil. However, he made a return to racing in the 2008 Brazilian GT3 Championship, partnering Brazilian filmmaker Walter Salles (not to be confused with Gualter Salles, against whom Rosset had earlier competed in British Formula 3). At the end of the season, the pair had won four times in their Ford GT and finished second in the overall standings.

Encouraged by this performance, Rosset bought the Footwork FA17 chassis that he raced in 1996, and planned to enter it in a historic F1 series in 2009, but ultimately did not. He later bought his 1998 Tyrrell 026 on eBay, and keeps both cars at his home. He has said of his Formula One career, "I was very grateful I had the chance... I did my best, the best I could do. I pushed as hard as I could... What people say, it doesn't bother me."

Rosset went on to win the Porsche GT3 Cup Brasil in 2010, 2013, and 2015.

== Racing record ==
=== Complete British Formula Three Championship results ===
(key)

Year	Entrant	Chassis	Engine	Class	1	2	3	4	5	6	7	8	9	10	11	12	13	14	15	16	17	18	DC	Points
1993	Alan Docking Racing	Ralt RT37	Mugen-Honda	A	SIL; Ret	THR; 8	BRH; 6	DON; DNS	BRH; 6	SIL; 8	OUL; Ret	DON; 8											6th	18
1993	Alan Docking Racing	Dallara F393	Mugen-Honda	A									SIL; 3	DON; 10	SNE; 3	PEM; 9	SIL; 2	SIL; 6	THR; 6				6th	18
1994	Team AJS	Dallara F394	Mugen-Honda	A	SIL; 9	DON; 10	BRH; 6	BRH; 10	SIL; 6	SIL; 4	BRH; Ret	THR; 6	OUL; 5	DON; 5	SIL; Ret	**SNE**; 1	PEM; 4	PEM; 3	SIL; 3	SIL; 2	THR; 3	SIL; Ret	5th	132

=== Complete International Formula 3000 results ===
(key) (Races in bold indicate pole position) (Races in italics indicate fastest lap)

Year	Entrant	1	2	3	4	5	6	7	8	DC	Points
1995	Super Nova Racing	**SIL**; 1	CAT; 2	PAU; 9	PER; 1	HOC; 9	SPA; 4	EST; 5	MAG; Ret	**2nd**	**29**

=== Complete Formula One results ===
(key)

Year	Entrant	Chassis	Engine	1	2	3	4	5	6	7	8	9	10	11	12	13	14	15	16	17	WDC	Points
1996	Footwork Arrows Hart	Footwork FA17	Hart V8	AUS; 9	BRA; Ret	ARG; Ret	EUR; 11	SMR; Ret	MON; Ret	ESP; Ret	CAN; Ret	FRA; 11	GBR; Ret	GER; 11	HUN; 8	BEL; 9	ITA; Ret	POR; 14	JPN; 13		NC	0
1997	MasterCard Lola F1 Team	Lola T97/30	Ford V8	AUS; DNQ	BRA	ARG	SMR	MON	ESP	CAN	FRA	GBR	GER	HUN	BEL	ITA	AUT	LUX	JPN	EUR	NC	0
1998	PIAA Tyrrell Ford	Tyrrell 026	Ford V10	AUS; Ret	BRA; Ret	ARG; 14	SMR; Ret	ESP; DNQ	MON; DNQ	CAN; 8	FRA; Ret	GBR; Ret	AUT; 12	GER; DNQ	HUN; DNQ	BEL; DNS	ITA; 12	LUX; Ret	JPN; DNQ		NC	0

=== Complete Stock Car Brasil results ===
Year	Team	Car	1	2	3	4	5	6	7	8	9	10	11	12	13	14	15	16	17	18	19	20	21	Rank	Points
2014	Vogel Motorsport	Chevrolet Sonic	INT; 1; 16	SCZ; 1	SCZ; 2	BRA; 1	BRA; 2	GOI; 1	GOI; 2	GOI; 1	CAS; 1	CAS; 2	CUR; 1	CUR; 2	VEL; 1	VEL; 2	SCZ; 1	SCZ; 2	TAR; 1	TAR; 2	SAL; 1	SAL; 2	CUR; 1	NC†	0†
2015	Vogel Motorsport	Chevrolet Sonic	GOI; 1 Ret	RBP; 1	RBP; 2	VEL; 1	VEL; 2	CUR; 1	CUR; 2	SCZ; 1	SCZ; 2	CUR; 1	CUR; 2	GOI; 1	CAS; 1	CAS; 2	BRA; 1	BRA; 2	CUR; 1	CUR; 2	TAR; 1	TAR; 2	INT; 1	NC†	0†

† Ineligible for championship points.

Sporting positions
Preceded by Miguel Paludo	Porsche GT3 Cup Brasil Champion; 2010	Succeeded by Constantino de Oliveira Júnior
Preceded by Ricardo Baptista	Porsche GT3 Cup Brasil Champion; 2013	Succeeded by Constantino de Oliveira Júnior
Preceded by Constantino de Oliveira Júnior	Porsche GT3 Cup Brasil Champion; 2015	Succeeded by Lico Kaesemodel
