= 1997 Brazilian Grand Prix =

Race 2 of 17 in the 1997 Formula One World Championship
← Previous race	Next race →
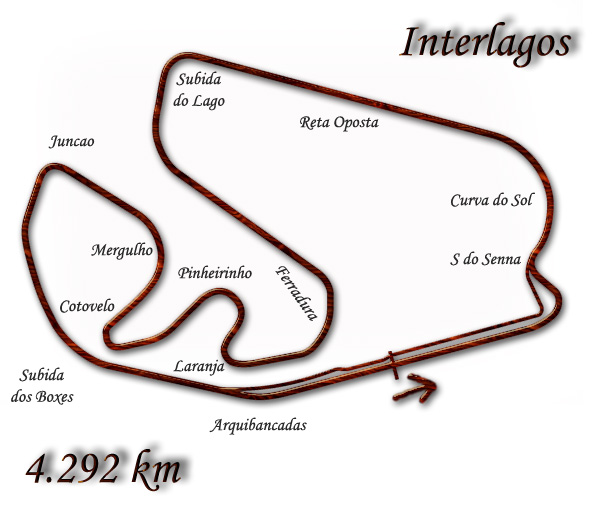

Race details
- Date: 30 March 1997
- Official name: XXVI Grande Prêmio do Brasil
- Location: Autódromo José Carlos Pace, São Paulo, Brazil
- Course: Permanent Racing Facility
- Course length: 4.292 km (2.667 miles)
- Distance: 72 laps, 309.024 km (192.019 miles)
- Weather: Overcast and dry with temperatures reaching up to 23 °C (73 °F)

Pole position
Driver	(Canada) Jacques Villeneuve	Williams-Renault
- Time: 1:16.004

Fastest lap
Driver	(Canada) Jacques Villeneuve	Williams-Renault
- Time: 1:18.397 on lap 28

Podium
First	(Canada) Jacques Villeneuve	Williams-Renault
Second	(Austria) Gerhard Berger	Benetton-Renault
Third	(France) Olivier Panis	Prost-Mugen-Honda

The 1997 Brazilian Grand Prix was a Formula One motor race held at Autódromo José Carlos Pace near Interlagos, Brazil on 30 March 1997. It was the second race of the 1997 Formula One season. The 72-lap race was won by Williams driver Jacques Villeneuve after he started from pole position. Gerhard Berger finished second for the Benetton team and Prost driver Olivier Panis was third.

== Summary ==
=== Lola withdrawal ===
Having failed to qualify for the previous race in Australia, things went from bad to worse for Lola as the Huntingdon-based team arrived in Brazil still not having received any money from title sponsor MasterCard. Already several million dollars in debt, the team returned to base without completing a lap of the circuit. As a result of this Lola's driver Ricardo Rosset was unable to compete at his home Grand Prix. A few days later, the team officially withdrew from the championship.

=== Qualifying ===
Jacques Villeneuve took his third consecutive, and his career fifth, pole position after a 1:16.004, over half a second faster than Michael Schumacher in second. Gerhard Berger and Mika Häkkinen completed the second row.

=== Race ===
The race was red-flagged after several incidents at the original start. Jacques Villeneuve went off the track at the first corner. Behind him, an incident involved several drivers including Damon Hill, Eddie Irvine, Giancarlo Fisichella and Jan Magnussen. Irvine took some blame for the incident. Additionally, Rubens Barrichello's car failed on the line, and the track blockage was what ultimately caused the red flag. Barrichello took the restart in the spare Stewart, causing Magnussen to miss the race.

The race was restarted with all 72 laps still remaining. Villeneuve had a clean start, as did the rest of the field. At the end of the first lap Villeneuve passed Michael Schumacher to retake the lead. Later before the first pit stops Berger would also pass Schumacher down the pit straight into the first corner. Irvine came into the pits mid-race, having been suffering from enormous pain due to his belts tightening up in the cockpit.

Damon Hill was once again affected by reliability issues, his engine failing with four laps remaining. He was running in fourth place at one point, but had slipped down the field before retiring in the pits with an engine bay fire caused by an oil leak. The winner of the previous race, David Coulthard, was off the pace and finished in 10th place.

== Classification ==
=== Qualifying ===
Pos	No	Driver	Constructor	Time	Gap
1	3	(Canada) Jacques Villeneuve	Williams-Renault	1:16.004	
2	5	(Germany) Michael Schumacher	Ferrari	1:16.594	+0.590
3	8	(Austria) Gerhard Berger	Benetton-Renault	1:16.644	+0.640
4	9	(Finland) Mika Häkkinen	McLaren-Mercedes	1:16.692	+0.688
5	14	(France) Olivier Panis	Prost-Mugen-Honda	1:16.756	+0.752
6	7	(France) Jean Alesi	Benetton-Renault	1:16.757	+0.753
7	12	(Italy) Giancarlo Fisichella	Jordan-Peugeot	1:16.912	+0.908
8	4	(Germany) Heinz-Harald Frentzen	Williams-Renault	1:16.924	+0.920
9	1	(United Kingdom) Damon Hill	Arrows-Yamaha	1:17.090	+1.086
10	11	(Germany) Ralf Schumacher	Jordan-Peugeot	1:17.175	+1.171
11	22	(Brazil) Rubens Barrichello	Stewart-Ford	1:17.259	+1.255
12	10	(United Kingdom) David Coulthard	McLaren-Mercedes	1:17.262	+1.258
13	16	(United Kingdom) Johnny Herbert	Sauber-Petronas	1:17.409	+1.405
14	6	(United Kingdom) Eddie Irvine	Ferrari	1:17.527	+1.523
15	15	(Japan) Shinji Nakano	Prost-Mugen-Honda	1:17.999	+1.995
16	2	(Brazil) Pedro Diniz	Arrows-Yamaha	1:18.095	+2.091
17	21	(Italy) Jarno Trulli	Minardi-Hart	1:18.336	+2.332
18	20	(Japan) Ukyo Katayama	Minardi-Hart	1:18.557	+2.553
19	17	(Italy) Nicola Larini	Sauber-Petronas	1:18.644	+2.640
20	23	(Denmark) Jan Magnussen	Stewart-Ford	1:18.773	+2.769
21	18	(Netherlands) Jos Verstappen	Tyrrell-Ford	1:18.885	+2.881
22	19	(Finland) Mika Salo	Tyrrell-Ford	1:19.274	+3.270
107% time: 1:21.324

=== Race ===
Pos	No	Driver	Constructor	Laps	Time/Retired	Grid	Points
1	3	(Canada) Jacques Villeneuve	Williams-Renault	72	1:36:06.990	1	10
2	8	(Austria) Gerhard Berger	Benetton-Renault	72	+4.190	3	6
3	14	(France) Olivier Panis	Prost-Mugen-Honda	72	+15.870	5	4
4	9	(Finland) Mika Häkkinen	McLaren-Mercedes	72	+33.033	4	3
5	5	(Germany) Michael Schumacher	Ferrari	72	+33.731	2	2
6	7	(France) Jean Alesi	Benetton-Renault	72	+34.020	6	1
7	16	(United Kingdom) Johnny Herbert	Sauber-Petronas	72	+50.912	13	
8	12	(Italy) Giancarlo Fisichella	Jordan-Peugeot	72	+1:00.639	7	
9	4	(Germany) Heinz-Harald Frentzen	Williams-Renault	72	+1:15.402	8	
10	10	(United Kingdom) David Coulthard	McLaren-Mercedes	71	+1 Lap	12	
11	17	(Italy) Nicola Larini	Sauber-Petronas	71	+1 Lap	19	
12	21	(Italy) Jarno Trulli	Minardi-Hart	71	+1 Lap	17	
13	19	(Finland) Mika Salo	Tyrrell-Ford	71	+1 Lap	22	
14	15	(Japan) Shinji Nakano	Prost-Mugen-Honda	71	+1 Lap	15	
15	18	(Netherlands) Jos Verstappen	Tyrrell-Ford	70	+2 Laps	21	
16	6	(United Kingdom) Eddie Irvine	Ferrari	70	+2 Laps	14	
17	1	(United Kingdom) Damon Hill	Arrows-Yamaha	68	Engine	9	
18	20	(Japan) Ukyo Katayama	Minardi-Hart	67	+5 Laps	18	
Ret	11	(Germany) Ralf Schumacher	Jordan-Peugeot	52	Electrical	10	
Ret	22	(Brazil) Rubens Barrichello	Stewart-Ford	16	Suspension	11	
Ret	2	(Brazil) Pedro Diniz	Arrows-Yamaha	15	Suspension	16	
DNS	23	(Denmark) Jan Magnussen	Stewart-Ford	0	Collision	20	

== Championship standings after the race ==
Drivers' Championship standings

Pos	Driver	Points
1	(United Kingdom) David Coulthard	10
2	(Canada) Jacques Villeneuve	10
3	(Austria) Gerhard Berger	9
4	(Germany) Michael Schumacher	8
5	(Finland) Mika Häkkinen	7

Constructors' Championship standings

Pos	Constructor	Points
1	(United Kingdom) McLaren-Mercedes	17
2	(Italy) Benetton-Renault	10
3	(United Kingdom) Williams-Renault	10
4	(Italy) Ferrari	8
5	(France) Prost-Mugen-Honda	6

- Note: Only the top five positions are included for both sets of standings.

Previous race: 1997 Australian Grand Prix	FIA Formula One World Championship; 1997 season	Next race: 1997 Argentine Grand Prix
Previous race: 1996 Brazilian Grand Prix	Brazilian Grand Prix	Next race: 1998 Brazilian Grand Prix
