= 1997 Australian Grand Prix =

Race 1 of 17 in the 1997 Formula One World Championship
← Previous race	Next race →

Race details
- Date: 9 March 1997
- Official name: Qantas Australian Grand Prix
- Location: Melbourne Grand Prix Circuit, Albert Park, Melbourne
- Course: Temporary street circuit
- Course length: 5.302 km (3.295 miles)
- Distance: 58 laps, 307.516 km (191.110 miles)
- Weather: Partly Cloudy, Dry

Pole position
Driver	(Canada) Jacques Villeneuve	Williams-Renault
- Time: 1:29.369

Fastest lap
Driver	(Germany) Heinz-Harald Frentzen	Williams-Renault
- Time: 1:30.585 on lap 36

Podium
First	(United Kingdom) David Coulthard	McLaren-Mercedes
Second	(Germany) Michael Schumacher	Ferrari
Third	(Finland) Mika Häkkinen	McLaren-Mercedes

The 1997 Australian Grand Prix (formally the Qantas Australian Grand Prix) was a Formula One motor race held at the Albert Park Circuit in Melbourne on 9 March 1997. It was the first race of the 1997 Formula One World Championship, and the second Australian Grand Prix to be held in Melbourne.

The 58-lap race was won by David Coulthard, driving a McLaren-Mercedes, after he started from fourth position. It was Coulthard's second F1 victory, and the first for the McLaren team since the 1993 Australian Grand Prix. German Michael Schumacher finished second in a Ferrari, with Coulthard's Finnish teammate Mika Häkkinen third. Canadian Jacques Villeneuve took pole position in his Williams-Renault but retired after a first-lap collision, while reigning World Champion Damon Hill, in his first race for the Arrows team, suffered a throttle failure on the formation lap and did not start.

This race marked the debuts of Ralf Schumacher, Jarno Trulli and Shinji Nakano; the entry of Bridgestone as a tyre supplier to compete with Goodyear; and the only appearance of the MasterCard Lola team, whose cars were over 11 seconds off Villeneuve's pole time and thus did not qualify. This was the first race weekend to have 24 pre-event entries since the 1995 Australian Grand Prix and the last until the 2010 Bahrain Grand Prix. It was also the first Formula One race to be broadcast on ITV in the United Kingdom, with commentary from Murray Walker, Martin Brundle and James Allen.

== Report ==
=== Background ===
Two new teams came into Formula One in 1997: Stewart and Lola. This was Lola's first F1 race weekend involvement in F1 since the 1993 Portuguese Grand Prix where they had been car supplier for the defunct BMS Scuderia Italia team and the first time they had entered their own team. Footwork reverted to their old name of Arrows and acquired Yamaha engines, while Ligier were bought by Alain Prost and changed their name to Prost Grand Prix. Tyrrell acquired Ford engines.

The change that dominated the drivers line up was Damon Hill's surprise sacking from Williams having just won the World Championship. He joined Tom Walkinshaw and the newly purchased Arrows team. In the week up to the race, there were rumours, which proved to be unfounded, of Hill having left Arrows due to the poor performance of the car. Pedro Diniz brought significant sponsorship backing, and was hired as Hill's teammate. Williams retained Jacques Villeneuve and replaced Hill with Heinz-Harald Frentzen.

Villeneuve was the bookmaker's favourite heading into the new season. He said that being the favourite put "extra pressure, but it's good pressure [on me]".

Ferrari retained Michael Schumacher and Eddie Irvine, Benetton kept Jean Alesi and Gerhard Berger and McLaren retained Mika Häkkinen and David Coulthard. The Jordan team had two new drivers in Giancarlo Fisichella, previously at Minardi, and Ralf Schumacher, brother of Michael. The new Prost Grand Prix team kept Olivier Panis and signed Japanese rookie driver Shinji Nakano. Sauber kept Johnny Herbert and the loss of Frentzen saw Peter Sauber sign Ferrari test driver Nicola Larini. Tyrrell retained Mika Salo for a third year and added Jos Verstappen to the team from Arrows. Minardi with V8 Hart engines signed Ukyo Katayama and Italian driver Jarno Trulli. Heinz-Harald Frentzen and Olivier Panis were both making their 50th race entry, and Johnny Herbert was making his 100th race entry.

The new Stewart Grand Prix team had signed Rubens Barrichello and Danish driver Jan Magnussen. Lola recruited ex-Footwork Arrows driver Ricardo Rosset and former Benetton test driver Vincenzo Sospiri.

Bridgestone also made their first official appearance in Formula 1, breaking Goodyear's reign as a sole tyre supplier which began in 1992. They provided tyres for Minardi, Arrows, Prost, Stewart and Lola. Previously, the company had produced Formula One tyres at the 1976 and 1977 Japanese Grand Prix for Japanese entrants such as Kazuyoshi Hoshino's Heros Racing and Kojima.

The British television coverage switched to ITV for the 1997 season and beyond, after 18 years of regular coverage for the BBC. Former driver Martin Brundle joined Murray Walker in the commentary box.

In the build-up to the weekend, Michael Schumacher said that the circuit "wasn't particularly special", resulting in some criticism from locals. There were also protests in the lead-up to the race, with protestors pouring diesel on to the track the week before the race. A strike also meant that there was no tram shuttle service running, with spectators forced to catch buses to the track. Jeff Kennett, the Premier of Victoria, labelling them "bloody minded" and that they will have to "incur the wrath of the community".

=== Practice and qualifying ===
Canadian Jacques Villeneuve took his fourth career pole position with a lap of 1:29.369, while Heinz-Harald Frentzen could only manage a 1:31.121 to fill the remaining spot on the front row. Villeneuve had gone even faster in the second practice session recording a lap of 1:28.594 and is recognized as an extraordinarily fast lap beating his pole time under almost identical conditions by 0.775. Only six drivers managed to qualify within 3 seconds of the pole position time. The session was red flagged with just over two minutes remaining after a collision between Gerhard Berger and Nicola Larini on the straight between turns 10 and 11. This resulted in many of the cars effectively having to complete a one-lap sprint to post a lap time before the end of the session. Damon Hill struggled during the session, only just qualifying inside of the 107% limit due to an oil leak which hampered the lap times. Both of the Lola cars failed to make the qualifying limit and were over ten seconds slower than Villeneuve in their first and only F1 qualifying session, as the team had to withdraw from the next race due to a lack of funds. Pedro Diniz was also outside of the 107% time, but he was permitted to race as he had set a time in practice within the 107% time.

=== Race ===
On the parade lap, Damon Hill's throttle jammed, leaving him stranded on the track and causing him to retire from the race. At the first corner, Eddie Irvine misjudged his braking, hitting both Villeneuve and Herbert - all three retired from the race. Williams adopted a two-stop strategy, while most other teams were going for one-stop races. Jos Verstappen spun off on lap two while attempting to overtake Ukyo Katayama. Frentzen quickly built up a lead: 2.7secs on the first lap, 3.7s on the second, 5.3s on the third and 7.2s on the fourth. Both of the Jordan cars soon retired from the race, Ralf Schumacher suffering a gearbox problem and Fisichella spinning off the track while passing Barrichello. By lap 12, however, Frentzen eased off, and for the next six laps the gap between first and second stayed at 17-18s. Frentzen pitted on lap 18 and rejoined third.

Jean Alesi retired from the race after running out of fuel, to the fury of his Benetton team, who had been trying to call him into the pits for 5 laps, an incident met with amusement from the ITV commentators. In the laps that followed Frentzen was able to close up on Coulthard and Schumacher. He lost time in traffic, struggling with his brakes. Coulthard and Schumacher pitted in mid-race and so Frentzen moved ahead again and ran very quickly for a few laps before he began to fade again. On lap 40 he came in for his second stop. The gap to Coulthard was only 23secs, and with the time in the pitlane being around 22-24secs it was unclear whether he could emerge ahead. In the end, his pit stop was delayed for several seconds by a right rear tire problem, allowing Coulthard and Schumacher to move ahead. At the front David Coulthard continued to keep away from these incidents to lead the race, followed by Michael Schumacher and Frentzen. Frentzen closed up on Coulthard and Schumacher who were by then running together but Schumacher had to make an unscheduled fuel stop towards the end of the race, promoting Frentzen to second. Large quantities of dust had been coming from Frentzen's brakes for some time and with three laps to go a brake disc failed, sending him into the gravel trap at the end of the start/finish straight. Coulthard went on to take his second career win. It was McLaren's first win since Ayrton Senna won the 1993 Australian Grand Prix. It was also their first win with Mercedes as an engine supplier, and Mercedes' first victory as an engine manufacturer since the 1955 Italian Grand Prix.

== Classification ==
=== Qualifying ===
Pos.	No.	Driver	Constructor	Time	Gap	Grid
1	3	(Canada) Jacques Villeneuve	Williams-Renault	1:29.369	—	1
2	4	(Germany) Heinz-Harald Frentzen	Williams-Renault	1:31.123	+1.754	2
3	5	(Germany) Michael Schumacher	Ferrari	1:31.472	+2.103	3
4	10	(United Kingdom) David Coulthard	McLaren-Mercedes	1:31.531	+2.162	4
5	6	(United Kingdom) Eddie Irvine	Ferrari	1:31.881	+2.512	5
6	9	(Finland) Mika Häkkinen	McLaren-Mercedes	1:31.971	+2.602	6
7	16	(United Kingdom) Johnny Herbert	Sauber-Petronas	1:32.287	+2.918	7
8	7	(France) Jean Alesi	Benetton-Renault	1:32.593	+3.224	8
9	14	(France) Olivier Panis	Prost-Mugen-Honda	1:32.842	+3.473	9
10	8	(Austria) Gerhard Berger	Benetton-Renault	1:32.870	+3.501	10
11	22	(Brazil) Rubens Barrichello	Stewart-Ford	1:33.075	+3.706	11
12	11	(Germany) Ralf Schumacher	Jordan-Peugeot	1:33.130	+3.761	12
13	17	(Italy) Nicola Larini	Sauber-Petronas	1:33.327	+3.958	13
14	12	(Italy) Giancarlo Fisichella	Jordan-Peugeot	1:33.552	+4.183	14
15	20	(Japan) Ukyo Katayama	Minardi-Hart	1:33.798	+4.429	15
16	15	(Japan) Shinji Nakano	Prost-Mugen-Honda	1:33.989	+4.620	16
17	21	(Italy) Jarno Trulli	Minardi-Hart	1:34.120	+4.751	17
18	19	(Finland) Mika Salo	Tyrrell-Ford	1:34.229	+4.860	18
19	23	(Denmark) Jan Magnussen	Stewart-Ford	1:34.623	+5.254	19
20	1	(United Kingdom) Damon Hill	Arrows-Yamaha	1:34.806	+5.437	20
21	18	(Netherlands) Jos Verstappen	Tyrrell-Ford	1:34.943	+5.574	21
107% time: 1:35.625
22	2	(Brazil) Pedro Diniz	Arrows-Yamaha	1:35.972	+6.603	22^{1}
DNQ	24	(Italy) Vincenzo Sospiri	Lola-Ford	1:40.972	+11.603	
DNQ	25	(Brazil) Ricardo Rosset	Lola-Ford	1:42.086	+12.717	
Sources:

- ^1 - Diniz set a lap time outside the 107% limit, but he was allowed to start at the back of the grid.

=== Race ===
Pos.	No.	Driver	Constructor	Tyre	Laps	Time/Retired	Grid	Points
1	10	(United Kingdom) David Coulthard	McLaren-Mercedes	G	58	1:30:28.718	4	10
2	5	(Germany) Michael Schumacher	Ferrari	G	58	+20.046	3	6
3	9	(Finland) Mika Häkkinen	McLaren-Mercedes	G	58	+22.177	6	4
4	8	(Austria) Gerhard Berger	Benetton-Renault	G	58	+22.841	10	3
5	14	(France) Olivier Panis	Prost-Mugen-Honda	B	58	+1:00.308	9	2
6	17	(Italy) Nicola Larini	Sauber-Petronas	G	58	+1:36.040	13	1
7	15	(Japan) Shinji Nakano	Prost-Mugen-Honda	B	56	+2 Laps	16	
8	4	(Germany) Heinz-Harald Frentzen	Williams-Renault	G	55	Brakes	2	
9	21	(Italy) Jarno Trulli	Minardi-Hart	B	55	+3 Laps	17	
10	2	(Brazil) Pedro Diniz	Arrows-Yamaha	B	54	+4 Laps	22	
Ret	22	(Brazil) Rubens Barrichello	Stewart-Ford	B	49	Engine	11	
Ret	19	(Finland) Mika Salo	Tyrrell-Ford	G	42	Engine	18	
Ret	23	(Denmark) Jan Magnussen	Stewart-Ford	B	36	Suspension	19	
Ret	7	(France) Jean Alesi	Benetton-Renault	G	34	Out of Fuel	8	
Ret	20	(Japan) Ukyo Katayama	Minardi-Hart	B	32	Electrical	15	
Ret	12	(Italy) Giancarlo Fisichella	Jordan-Peugeot	G	14	Spun Off	14	
Ret	18	(Netherlands) Jos Verstappen	Tyrrell-Ford	G	2	Spun Off	21	
Ret	11	(Germany) Ralf Schumacher	Jordan-Peugeot	G	1	Gearbox	12	
Ret	3	(Canada) Jacques Villeneuve	Williams-Renault	G	0	Collision	1	
Ret	6	(United Kingdom) Eddie Irvine	Ferrari	G	0	Collision	5	
Ret	16	(United Kingdom) Johnny Herbert	Sauber-Petronas	G	0	Collision	7	
DNS	1	(United Kingdom) Damon Hill	Arrows-Yamaha	B	0	Throttle	20	

== Championship standings after the race ==
Drivers' Championship standings

Pos	Driver	Points
1	(United Kingdom) David Coulthard	10
2	(Germany) Michael Schumacher	6
3	(Finland) Mika Häkkinen	4
4	(Austria) Gerhard Berger	3
5	(France) Olivier Panis	2

Constructors' Championship standings

Pos	Constructor	Points
1	(United Kingdom) McLaren-Mercedes	14
2	(Italy) Ferrari	6
3	(Italy) Benetton-Renault	3
4	(France) Prost-Mugen-Honda	2
5	(Switzerland) Sauber-Petronas	1

- Note: Only the top five positions are included for both sets of standings.

Previous race: 1996 Japanese Grand Prix	FIA Formula One World Championship; 1997 season	Next race: 1997 Brazilian Grand Prix
Previous race: 1996 Australian Grand Prix	Australian Grand Prix	Next race: 1998 Australian Grand Prix
Awards
Preceded by 1996 Australian Grand Prix	Formula One Promotional Trophy for Race Promoter; 1997	Succeeded by 1998 San Marino Grand Prix
