= Trident Cars =

British car manufacturer

- Industry: Automotive
- Founded: 1965
- Founder: WJ (Bill) Last
- Defunct: 1977
- Fate: Insolvency
- Headquarters: Woodbridge, Ipswich (United Kingdom)

Trident Cars Ltd was a British car manufacturer based originally in Woodbridge, then in Ipswich, Suffolk between 1966 and 1974. The company produced a small series of sports cars with different engines from 1967 to 1977 and was later re-established in 1999.

== History ==
=== Roots at TVR ===
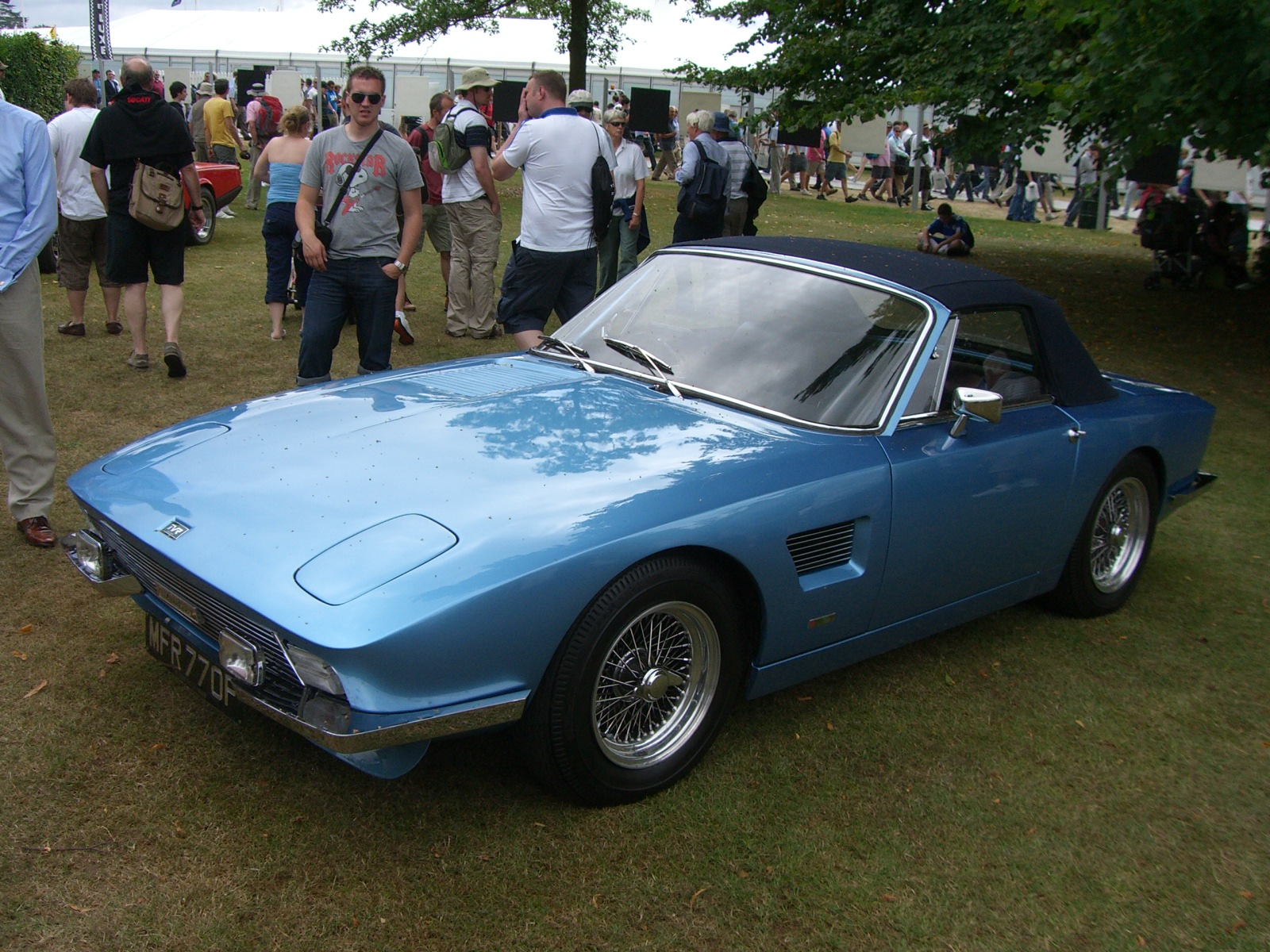
1967 TVR Trident Roadster, Goodwood Festival of Speed 2009

Trident Cars has its origins in a failed project by the sports car manufacturer TVR.

TVR went through a series of bankruptcies and takeovers in the early 1960s. Layton Sports Cars, founded in 1959 and renamed TVR Cars in 1961, was insolvent at the end of 1962 and was dissolved. The newly founded Grantura Engineering Ltd. took its place and continued production of the TVR Grantura at the same Blackpool facilities. At the end of 1965, Grantura Engineering was also insolvent. In addition to the TVR Grantura, the companies also had the Griffith 200 (later 400) in their range, which, with an unchanged body, was equipped with an V8-engine from Ford USA instead of a British four-cylinder engine. It was primarily intended for the North American market.

In 1962, Brian Hopton, one of the owners of TVR Cars, commissioned the British designer Trevor Fiore to design a new body for the Griffith 200. He had previously tried in vain to recruit Frank Costin as a designer. Fiore designed a compact hatchback coupe, of which the Italian Carrozzeria Fissore produced a prototype with an aluminum body and an extended TVR chassis. Fissore presented it as the Trident at the Geneva Motor Show in March 1965. During the course of the year, Fissore built two more prototypes - a coupé and a convertible - but after the bankruptcy of Grantura Cars at the end of 1965, the Trident project was initially discontinued. Arthur and Martin Lilley, who took over the production facilities in Blackpool in November 1965 and incorporated them into the newly founded company TVR Engineering, initially assumed that they would also take over the Trident project. In fact, the British TVR dealer William “Bill” Last had previously acquired the rights to Fiore’s design and the moulds for the Trident body.

=== Trident Cars ===
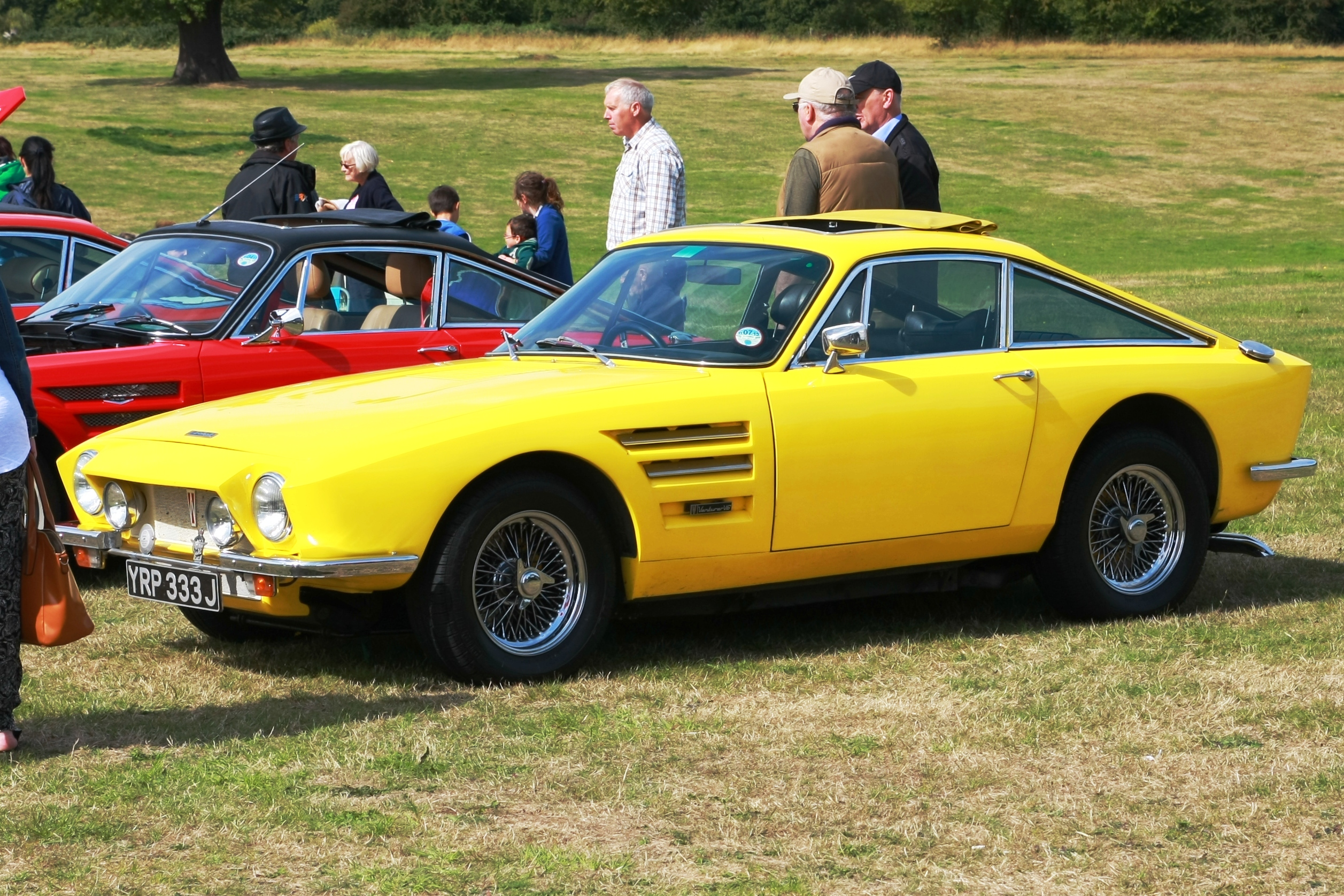
Trident Venturer V6 (ca 1970)

Bill Last founded Trident Cars, initially in Woodbridge, using the premises he previously used for manufacture of the Peel Viking Sport. The company later moved to Ipswich. The newly founded company presented a fourth prototype at the Racing Car Show at Olympia in 1966, but little more was heard until the company presented a fifth prototype, again at Olympia, in 1967. Trident later began series production of the coupé in 1967, largely following Trevor Fiore's prototypes in terms of style. Over the years, different six and eight cylinder engines of British and US origin were installed; the respective vehicles were given different model names. In 1974, Trident temporarily stopped production. In 1975 the company was restructured. The US investor Ernest Stern took over the majority share. Trident then tried to reach the North American market with a revised version of the Clipper, but nothing came of it and only two cars were built.

Engine problems in the cars, the oil crisis and the financial climate in the 1970s resulted in the company closing down in 1974. An attempt was made to restart production in 1976 but few cars were made before final closure in 1977.

Most sources assume that Trident sold a total of around 130 vehicles from 1967 to 1977, with Trident claiming 120 has been made at the time of the company being put up for sale in 1975 (and ten rolling chassis and 5 complete bodies also being sold).

=== Revival ===
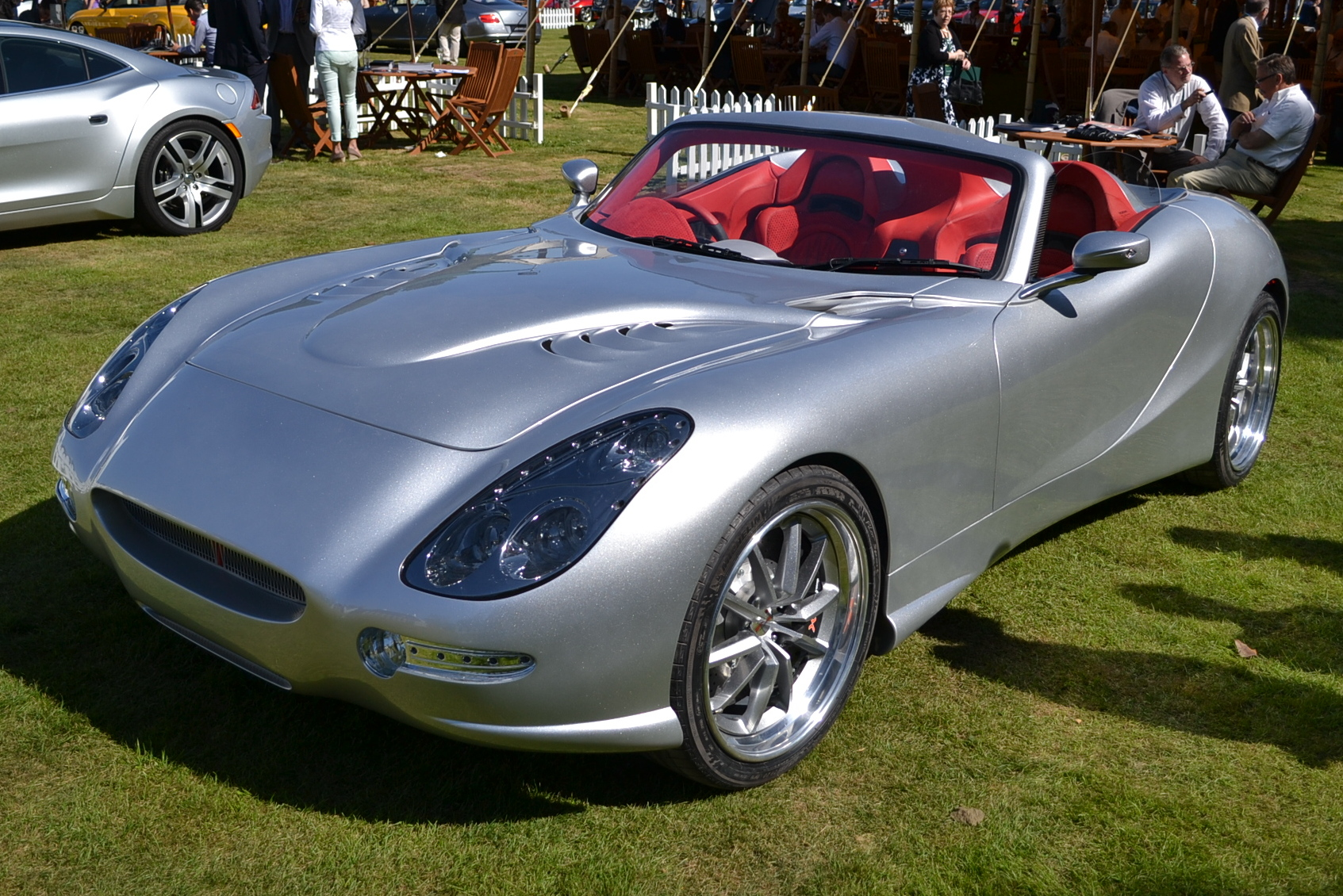
Trident Iceni Turbodiesel

In May 1999 the company was re-established in Fakenham. The first result of this new venture was the prototype of a two-seater spider, the Iceni, which was presented at the Birmingham International Motor Show the following year. The car featured a 3.2-liter V6 engine. From 2007 the concept was equipped with a 6.6-liter General Motors turbodiesel V8 engine. In 2014 the closed version was presented with the name Iceni Magna. The car has yet to be produced due to funding issues.

== Models ==
=== Clipper (1965–1974) ===
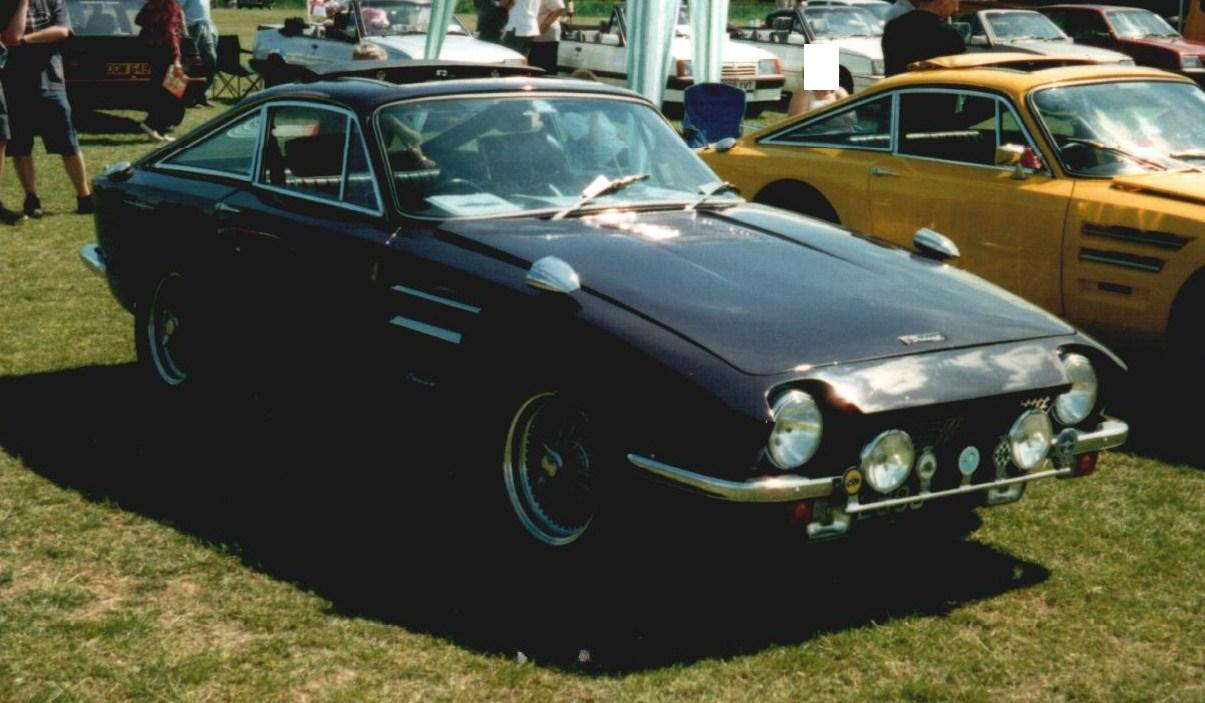
1970 Trident Clipper

Trident Cars' first model was the Clipper coupe. It was based on the 1965 TVR Trident prototype. Technically, Trident broke away from the TVR roots. Instead of an extended Grantura chassis like the prototypes, the production models in the first few years had Austin-Healey 3000 chassis. After production stopped in 1969, Trident used Triumph TR6 chassis, which were slightly lengthened. The driving behaviour was particularly problematic when cornering and braking. The car was claimed to have a maximum speed of 150 mph (240 km/h) and a 0-60 mph time of 5 seconds. It was available as a complete car or in kit form. The cars were expensive, the kit version costing £1,923.

==== The Ford version ====
The first 30 Clippers were equipped with eight-cylinder V-engines with a displacement of 4727 cm³ (289 cubic inches) from Ford, which delivered 271 bhp (275 hp; 202 kW) and in a similar form from 1962 to 1967, had been installed in the TVR Griffith 200 and 400. Shelby also used them in the AC Cobra 289. The 30 Ford engines came from an order from Grantura Engineering before the bankruptcy. Bill Last had taken it over along with the Trident package. The retail price in its debut year was £1,923 before tax. This made the Trident £1,000 cheaper than the AC Cobra 289. After this supply was exhausted, Trident did not purchase any more engines from Ford. Some publications give the reason for this as “delivery difficulties” at Ford or a strike.

==== The Chrysler version ====
The factory instead offered the Clipper with eight-cylinder engines from Chrysler starting in 1971. They had a displacement of 5576 cm³, produced around 300 bhp (304 hp, 224 kW) according to factory information and were coupled to a three-speed automatic transmission from Chrysler. The retail price in 1971 before tax was £3,398. It is unclear how many Clippers were produced with Chrysler engines. One source assumes that only one exhibit was created, while series production did not materialize.

==== Production ====
The information on the production numbers of the Clipper varies in the literature between 35 and 39 vehicles in total. The British brand club, however, only assumes 30 vehicles. This would be consistent with the assumption that the Chrysler-engined Clipper was not mass-produced.

=== Venturer (1969–1974) ===
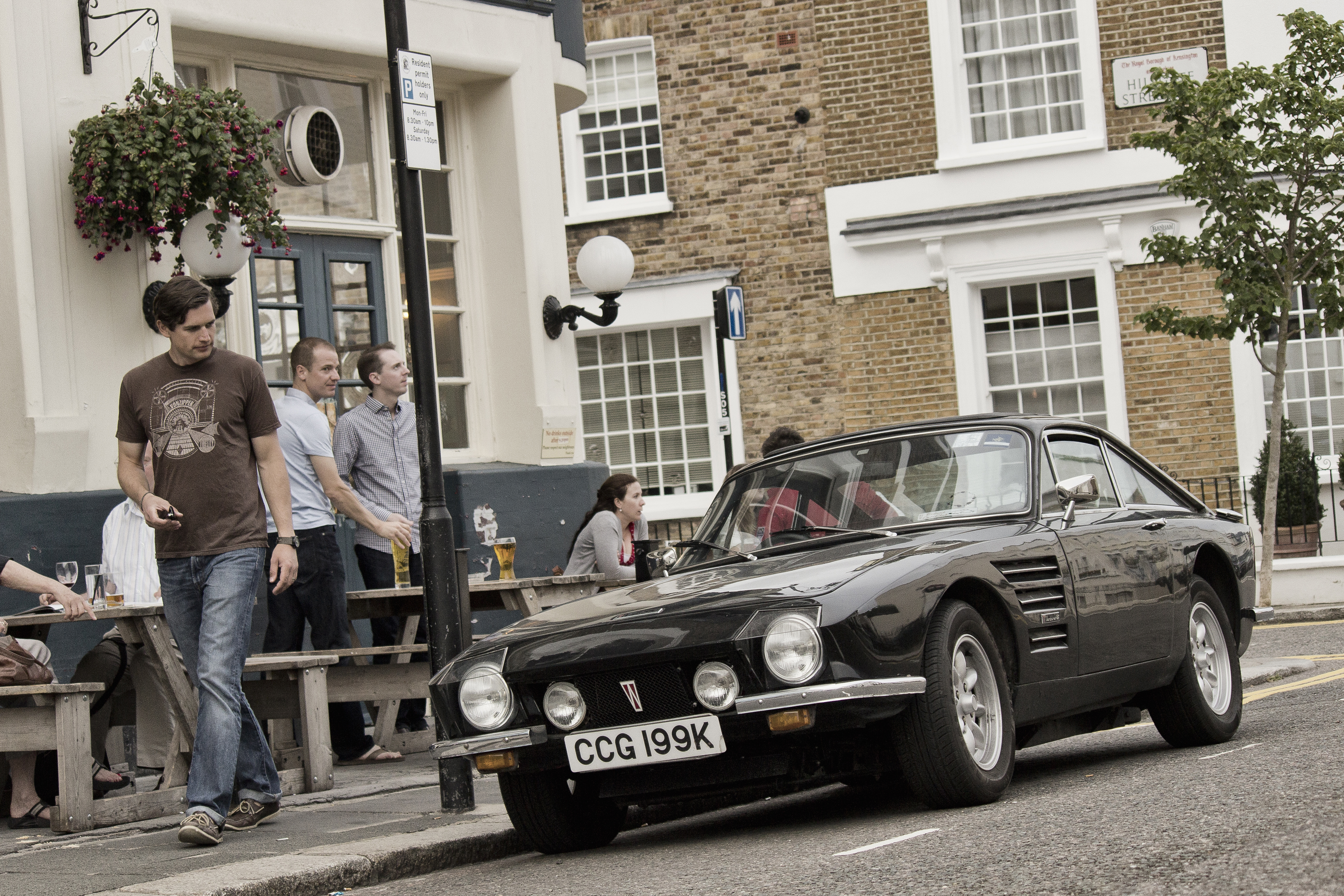
1971 Trident Venturer

The Venturer was the second and by far most successful variant of the Trident Coupé. It appeared in 1969. All examples were based on the extended chassis of the Triumph TR6, giving the car independent suspension all round by coil springs. The Venturer was equipped with a 3.0 litre (2,996 cc) version of the British Ford Essex six-cylinder engine. The power was transmitted by a manual four-speed gearbox. The car cost £2,298 (in kit form) ex-tax before taxes in 1971. Most sources assume that a total of 84 examples of the Venturer were produced until 1974. The British brand club, however, only assumes 49 vehicles.

=== Tycoon (1971–1974) ===
This coupé appeared in 1971. Instead of the eight-cylinder engine from Ford, it had a 2498 cc in-line six-cylinder engine from Triumph with fuel injection. It produced 150 bhp and was connected to an automatic transmission. Six or seven copies of this version were made.

=== Clipper (1976–1978) ===
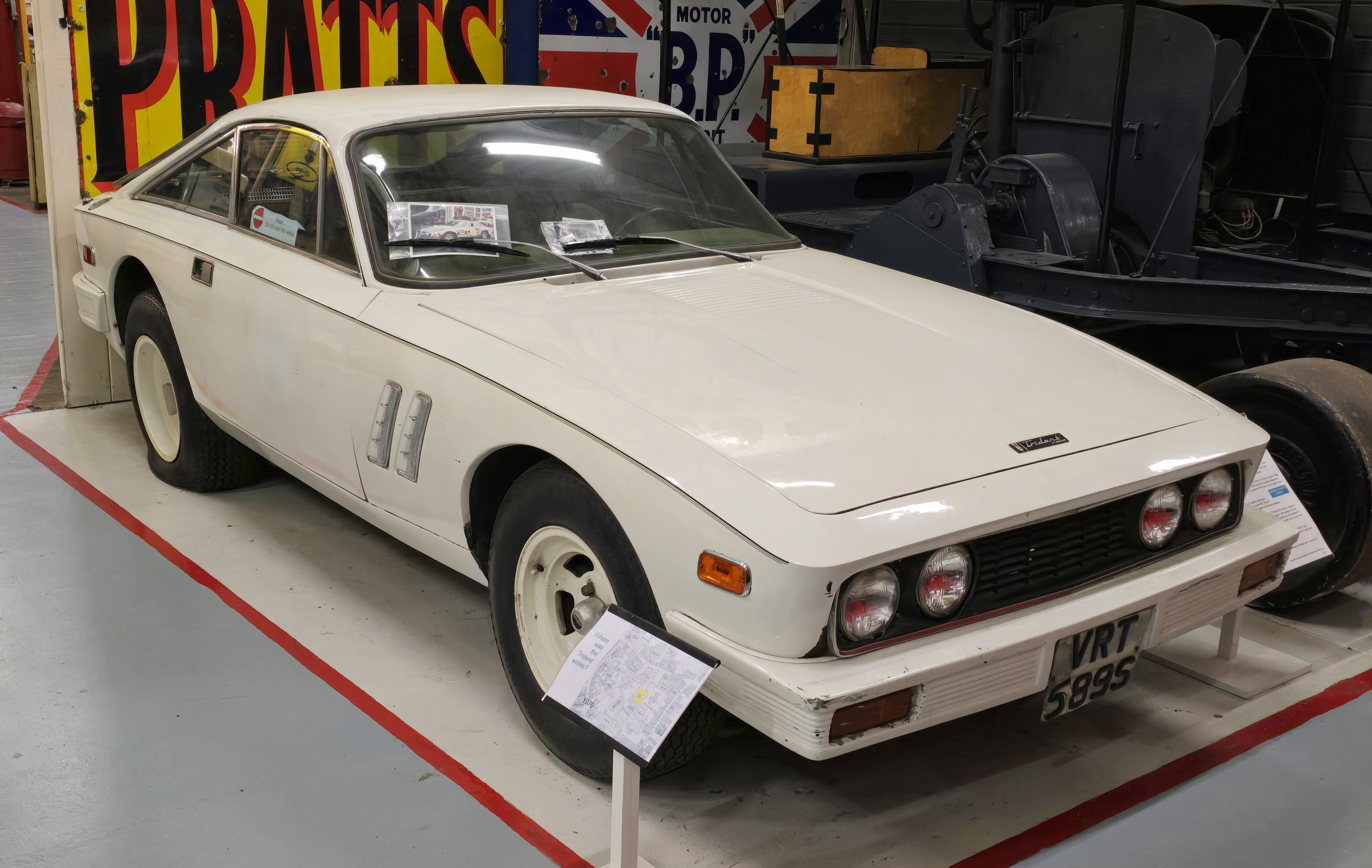
1976 Trident Clipper V8

After restructuring the company, Trident introduced a revised version of the Clipper at the 1976 London Motor Show. It differed from the earlier models in that it had a differently designed front section and safety bumpers according to US specifications. The exhibit was equipped with a 223 hp eight-cylinder engine from Chrysler with a displacement of 5898 cm³. According to one source, a V8 engine from Ford was also available as an alternative. Trident wanted to enter the US market with this version. That didn't happen. Due to ongoing economic difficulties, only two copies of the new Clipper were built. One car had right-hand drive and the second left-hand drive.

=== Venturer (1977–1978) ===
Along with the new edition of the Clipper in 1977, Trident also announced a new six-cylinder version. As with the previous Venturer, the Ford Essex engine with a displacement of 3.0 liters and 138 hp was to be used here. There is no evidence of production of this new Venturer.

== Literature ==
- David Culshaw, Peter Horrobin: The Complete Catalogue of British Cars 1895–1975. Veloce Publishing plc., Dorchester 1997, ISBN 1-874105-93-6
- Ralph Dodds: TVR. Cars Of The Peter Wheeler Era, The Crowood Press, Ramsburg 2015, ISBN 978-1-84797-997-1
- G. N. Georgano: Autos. Encyclopédie complète. 1885 à nos jours. Courtille, 1975 (in French)
- Mike Gullett: European Style with American Muscle. Mike Gullett, 2011, ISBN 978-1-257-90496-9
- Harald H. Linz, Halwart Schrader: Die große Automobil-Enzyklopädie. BLV, München 1986, (in German), ISBN 3-405-12974-5
- John Tipler: TVR, Sutton Publishing Ltd., Strout, 1998, ISBN 0-7509-1766-0
- Matthew Vale: TVR 1946–1982. The Trevor Wilkinson and Martin Lilley Years, The Crowood Press, Ramsbury 2017, ISBN 978-1-78500-351-6

== See also ==
- List of car manufacturers of the United Kingdom
