= Jim Mooney =

American comics artist (1919–2008)

- Born: August 13, 1919 New York City, New York, U.S.
- Died: March 30, 2008 (aged 88) Florida, U.S.
- Areas: Penciller, Inker
- Pseudonym: Jay Noel
- Notable works: Action Comics (Tommy Tomorrow, Supergirl); Spectacular Spider-Man; Star Spangled Comics (Robin)

James Noel Mooney (August 13, 1919 – March 30, 2008) was an American comics artist best known for his long tenure at DC Comics and as the signature artist of Supergirl, as well as a Marvel Comics inker and Spider-Man artist, both during what comics historians and fans call the Silver Age of Comic Books and what is known as the Bronze Age of Comic Books. He sometimes inked under the pseudonym Jay Noel.

== Biography ==
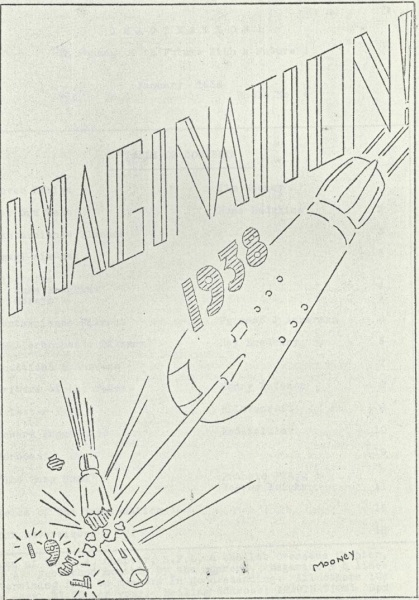
Mooney's cover for the 1938 fanzine Imagination, containing Ray Bradbury's first published story

=== Early life and career ===
Jim Mooney was born in New York City and raised in Los Angeles. Friends with pulp-fiction author Henry Kuttner and Californian science-fiction fans such as Forrest J. Ackerman, he drew the cover for the first issue of Imagination, an Ackerman fanzine that included Ray Bradbury's first published story, "Hollerbochen's Dilemma". Kuttner encouraged the teenaged Mooney to submit art to Farnsworth Wright, the editor of the pulp magazine for which Kuttner was writing, Weird Tales. Mooney's first professional sale was an illustration for one of Kuttner's stories in that magazine. During this period, Mooney also met future comic-book editors Mort Weisinger and Julius Schwartz, who had come to the area to meet Kuttner.

After attending art school and working as a parking valet and other odd jobs for nightclubs, Mooney went to New York City in 1940 to enter the fledgling comic-book field. Following his first assignment, the new feature "The Moth" in Fox Publications' Mystery Men Comics #9–12 (April–July 1940), Mooney worked for the comic book packager Eisner & Iger, one of the studios that would supply outsourced comics to publishers testing the waters of the new medium. He left voluntarily after two weeks: "I was just absolutely crestfallen when I looked at some of the guys’ work. Lou Fine was working there, Nick Cardy ... and Eisner himself. I was beginning to feel that I was way, way in beyond my depth...."

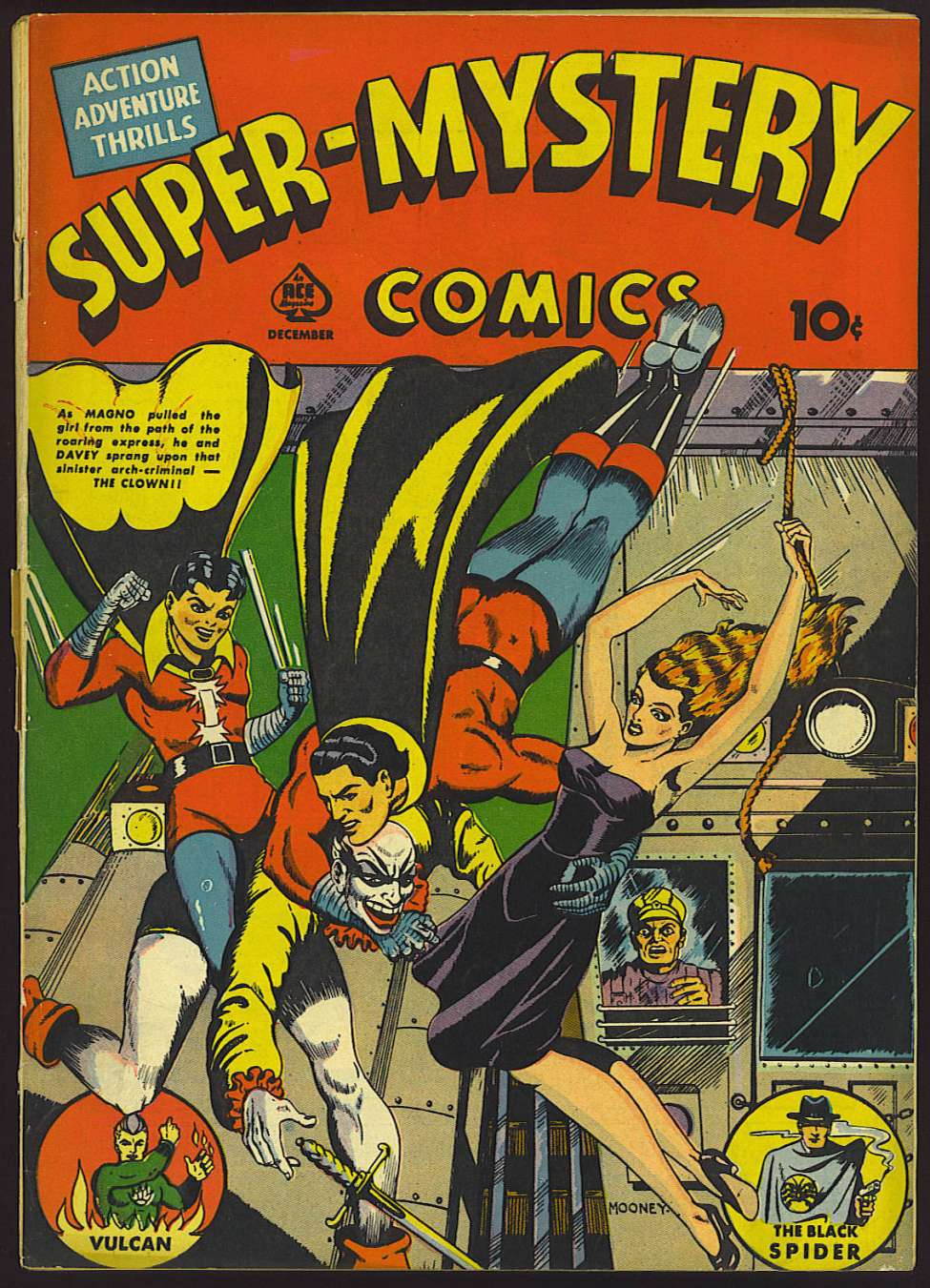
Super-Mystery Comics #5 (Ace Magazines, Dec. 1940): Jim Mooney's first professional cover art

Mooney went on staff at Fiction House for approximately nine months, working on features including "Camilla" and "Suicide Smith" and becoming friends with colleagues George Tuska, Ruben Moreira, and Cardy. He began freelancing for Timely Comics, the 1940s predecessor of Marvel, working on that company's "animation" line of talking animal and movie-cartoon tie-in comics.

As Mooney describes his being hired by editor-in-chief and art director Stan Lee:

I met Stan the first time when I was looking for work at Timely. . . . I came in, being somewhat young and cocky at the time, and Stan asked me what I did. I said I penciled; he said, 'What else?' I said I inked. He said, 'What else?' I said, 'Color.' 'Do anything else?' I said, 'Yeah, I letter, too.' He said, 'Do you print the damn books, too?' I guess he was about two or three years my junior at that point. I think I was about 21 or 22.

Mooney also wrote and drew a talking animal feature, "Perky Penguin and Booby Bear", in 1946 and 1947 for Treasure Chest, the Catholic-oriented comic book distributed in parochial schools.

=== Supergirl and DC ===
In 1946, Mooney began a 22-year association with the company that would evolve into DC. He began with the series Batman as a ghost artist for credited artist Bob Kane. As Mooney recalled of coming to DC,

[T]he funny animal stuff was no longer in demand, and an awful lot of us were scurrying around looking for work . . . and I heard on the grapevine that they were looking for an artist to do Batman. So I buzzed up there to DC, talked to them and showed them my stuff, and even though they weren't so sure because of my funny-animal background, they gave me a shot at it. I brought the work in, and [editor] Whitney Ellsworth said, 'OK, you're on'. . . . [I]t was ghosting. [Prominent Batman ghost-artist] Dick Sprang [had] taken off and wanted to do something else. So Dick took off for Arizona, and DC was looking for someone to fill in. So, that's where I fit in, and I stayed on Batman for quite a few years. . . .

Writer Bill Finger and Mooney introduced the Catman character in Detective Comics #311 (Jan. 1963). Mooney branched out to the series Superboy, and such features as "Dial H for Hero" in House of Mystery, and Tommy Tomorrow in both Action Comics and World's Finest Comics. He also contributed to Atlas Comics, the 1950s iteration of Marvel, on at least a handful of 1953-54 issues of Lorna the Jungle Queen.

Most notably, Mooney drew the backup feature "Supergirl" in Action Comics from 1959 to 1968. For much of this run on his signature character, Mooney lived in Los Angeles, managing an antiquarian book store on Hollywood Boulevard and sometimes hiring art students to work in the store and ink backgrounds on his pencilled pages. By 1968, he had moved back to New York, where DC, he recalled, was

... getting into the illustrative type of art then, primarily Neal Adams, and they wanted to go in that direction. Towards the end there I picked up on it and I think my later 'Supergirl' was quite illustrative, but not quite what they wanted. I knew the handwriting was on the wall, so I was looking around.... The reason I hadn't worked at Marvel for all those years was because they didn't pay as well as DC. ... I think at that time [it] was $30 [a page] when I was getting closer to $50 at DC".

=== Spider-Man and Marvel ===
Jim Mooney drew himself into these three panels from The Spectacular Spider-Man #41 (April 1980).

By now, however, the rates were closer, and Mooney left DC. Marvel editor Stan Lee had him work with The Amazing Spider-Man penciler John Romita. Mooney first worked on Spider-Man by inking The Spectacular Spider-Man magazine's two issues. Mooney would go on to ink a run of Amazing Spider-Man (#65, 67-88; Oct. 1968, Dec. 1968 - Sept. 1970), which he recalled as "finalising it over John’s layouts". Among the new characters introduced during Mooney's run on the title were Randy Robertson as a member of the supporting cast in issue #67 (Dec. 1968) and the Prowler in #78 (Nov. 1969). Mooney also embellished John Buscema's pencils on many issues of The Mighty Thor.

As a penciler, Mooney did several issues of Peter Parker, the Spectacular Spider-Man, as well as Spider-Man stories in Marvel Team-Up, and he both penciled and inked issues of writer Steve Gerber's Man-Thing and the entire 10-issue run of Gerber's cult-hit Omega the Unknown, among many other titles. Mooney named his collaborations with Gerber as being among his personal favorites. In 2010, Comics Bulletin ranked Gerber and Mooney's run on Omega the Unknown tenth on its list of the "Top 10 1970s Marvels". Carrion debuted in The Spectacular Spider-Man #25 (Dec. 1978) by Bill Mantlo and Mooney. Writer Ralph Macchio and Mooney introduced the character Rapier in The Spectacular Spider-Man Annual #2 (1980).

Mooney also worked on Marvel-related coloring books, for the child-oriented Spidey Super Stories, and for a Spider-Man feature in a children's-magazine spin-off of the PBS educational series The Electric Company, which included segments featuring Spider-Man. On the other end of the spectrum, he drew in the late 1960s and early 1970s for Marvel publisher Martin Goodman's bawdy men's-adventure magazines comics feature entitled "Pussycat. The feature appeared in "Men's Annual," "Male Annual" and "Stag" magazines. A one shot reprint of those stories appeared in 1968's "The Adventures of Pussycat": "Stan [Lee] wrote the first one I did, and then his brother Larry [Lieber] wrote the ones that came later".Stan Lee was not the editor of this reprint, Goodman's son Chip was.

In 1975, Mooney, wanting to move to Florida, negotiated a 10-year contract with Marvel to supply artwork from there. "It was a good deal. The money wasn't too great, but I was paid every couple of weeks, I had insurance, and I had a lot of security that most freelancers never had". That same year, Mooney and his wife, Anne, had a daughter, Nolle.

=== Harris, Claypool and DC ===
In Florida, Mooney co-created Adventure Publications' Star Rangers with writer Mark Ellis, and worked on Superboy for DC Comics, Anne Rice's The Mummy for Millennium Publications, and the Creepy miniseries for Harris Comics.

When Harris editor Richard Howell left to co-found Claypool Comics in 1993, Mooney produced many stories for the 166-issue run of Elvira, Mistress of the Dark and became the regular inker on writer Peter David's Soulsearchers and Company, over the pencils of Amanda Conner, Neil Vokes, John Heebink, and Dave Cockrum. Mooney also inked four covers of Howell's Deadbeats series. He continued to work for Claypool until July 2006 when the company announced that the print end of its published line would cease. Mooney's other later work included the sole issue of writer Mark Evanier's Flaxen, over Howell pencils; and a retro "Lady Supreme" story for Awesome Entertainment.

In 1996, Mooney was one of the many creators who contributed to the Superman: The Wedding Album one-shot wherein the title character married Lois Lane.

=== Commissions, Retirement, and Death ===
Throughout his later years, Mooney kept busy creating commissioned art pieces for fans.

His wife Anne died in 2005. Mooney died March 30, 2008, in Florida after an extended illness.

== Bibliography ==
Comics work (pencils or inking) includes:

=== DC Comics ===
- Action Comics (Tommy Tomorrow) #172–196, 199–251; (Supergirl) #253–342, 344–350, 353–358, 360–373 (1952–1969); (Superman) #667 (among other artists) (1991)
- Adventure Comics #91, 284 (1944–1961); (Legion of Super-Heroes) #328–331 (full art); #361 (inks over Curt Swan) (1965–1967)
- Adventures of Superboy (based on TV Series) #18–20 (1991)
- The Adventures of Superman #480 (among other artists) (1991)
- Batman #38, 41, 43–44, 48–49, 53–54, 56, 59–60, 72, 76, 148, 150 (1946–1962)
- Detective Comics #126, 132, 134, 143, 163, 181, 296, 299, 311, 318 (1947–1963)
- Falling in Love #5 (1956)
- Fanboy #5 (1999)
- The Flash vol. 2 #19 (1988)
- Gang Busters #5 (1948)
- Girls' Love Stories #53 (1958)
- Girls' Romances #33 (inks over Sy Barry) (1955)
- House of Mystery #2, 5–6, 10, 20, 23–24, 27, 30, 32–35, 39–40, 46–47, 49, 51, 56, 70, 83, 85, 156–170, 178 (1952–1969)
- House of Secrets #1, 3–4, 9 (1956–1958)
- Mr. District Attorney #5 (1948)
- My Greatest Adventure #5–6, 19–21, 23–24, 27 (1955–1959)
- Mystery in Space #6 (1952)
- Silver Age Secret Files (2000)
- Star Spangled Comics (Robin) #74, 76–95, 97–130 (1947–1952)
- Strange Adventures #1–5, 7–8, 11, 15, 24, 38, 183 (1950–1965)
- Superboy The Comic Book (based on TV series) #1–8 (1990)
- Superman #185 (1966)
- Superman's Pal Jimmy Olsen #92 (1966)
- Superman: The Wedding Album (among other artists) (1996)
- Tales of the Unexpected #10, 17–19, 23–25, 28, 32–33, 35–37, 39–46, 48–49, 53 (1957–1960)
- World's Finest Comics (Batman) #27, 37, 39–40, 42, 44; (Tommy Tomorrow) #102–120; (Superman and Batman) #121–130, 132–134, 136–140 (1947–1964)

=== Marvel Comics ===
- A-Team #2 (1984)
- Adventure into Mystery #3 (1956)
- Adventures into Terror #17 (1953)
- Adventures into Weird Worlds #6–7, 21 (1952–1953)
- All True Crime #47 (1951)
- Amazing Adventures #14 (inks over Tom Sutton) (1972)
- Amazing Detecitve Cases #12 (1952)
- The Amazing Spider-Man #65, 68–71, 73–82, 86–87, 207 (full art); #67, 72, 88, 116–118 (inks over John Romita Sr.); #84–85 (inks over John Buscema); #126, 173–175, 178 (inks over Ross Andru); #189–190 (inks over John Bryrne); #192–193, 197, 200–202, 205 (inks over Kieth Pollard); #196 (inks over Al Milgrom); #198–199 (inks over Sal Buscema); #211–218, 226–227, 229–233 (inks over John Romita Jr.); #219 (inks over Luke McDonnell); #221 (inks over Alan Kupperberg); #222 (inks over Bob Hall); Annual #11 (inks over Don Perlin); Annual #17 (inks over Ed Hannigan) (1968–1983)
- Astonishing #15, 29, 51, 58 (1952–1957)
- The Avengers #179–180 (full art); #86, 88 (inks over Sal Buscema); #105 (inks over John Buscema) (1971–1979)
- Battle #62–63 (1959)
- Battlestar Galactica #14 (1980)
- Captain America #149, 153 (inks over Sal Buscema)
- Captain America Comics #57 (inks over Al Avison) (1946)
- Cat #2 (inks over Marie Severin) (1973)
- Combat Kelly #1 (inks over Dick Ayers) (1972)
- Creatures on the Loose #19 (inks over Wayne Boring) (1972)
- Crypt of Shadows #3, 5, 16 (1973–1975)
- Daredevil #111, 133–135, 142 (inks over Bob Brown); #136–137 (inks over John Buscema); #138 (inks over John Byrne); #139 (inks over Sal Buscema); #141, 146 (inks over Gil Kane); #145 (inks over George Tuska) (1974–1977)
- Defenders #3, 31–34, 62–63 (inks over Sal Buscema); #85 (inks over Don Perlin) (1972–1980)
- Doc Savage #1 (inks over Ross Andru) (1972)
- Fantastic Four #118 (inks over John Buscema); #159 (inks over Rich Buckler) (1972–1974)
- Fear #11 (inks over Rich Buckler) (1972)
- Ghost Rider #2–9 (full art); #30 (inks over Don Perlin) (1973–1978)
- Giant-Size Defenders #3 (inks over Jim Starlin) (1975)
- Godzilla, King of the Monsters #1 (inks over Herb Trimpe) (1977)
- The Incredible Hulk vol. 2 #230 (full art); #288 (inks over Sal Buscema) (1978–1983)
- Inhumans #11 (inks over Kieth Pollard) (1977)
- Invaders #16 (full art); #5 (inks over Rich Buckler) (1976–1977)
- Iron Man #37 (inks over Don Heck); #40–41, 43 (inks over George Tuska; #47 (inks over Barry Windsor Smith); #73 (inks over Kieth Pollard) (1971–1975)
- Journey into Mystery vol. 2 #8 (1973)
- Journey Into Unknown Worlds #42, 46 (1956)
- Kid Colt Outlaw #98 (inks over Jack Keller) (1961)
- Lorna the Jungle Queen #2–5 (1953–1954)
- Lovers #51 (1953)
- Man-Thing #17–22 (1975)
- Man-Thing vol. 2 #1–3 (1979–1980)
- Marvel Comics Presents #16, 73 (1989–1991)
- Marvel Mystery Comics #55, 91 (1944–1949)
- Marvel Spotlight #14–17, 27 (full art); #8 (inks over Mike Ploog); #10 (inks over Tom Sutton); #32 (inks over Sal Buscema) (1973–1977)
- Marvel Super Special #7 (inks over George Perez) (1979)
- Marvel Tales #114, 145, 148, 155 (1953–1957)
- Marvel Team-Up #8, 10–11, 24–31, 72 (full art); #2, 7 (inks over Ross Andru); #16 (inks over Gil Kane); #93 (inks over Carmine Infantino); Annual #5 (inks over Mark Gruenwald) (1972–1982)
- Marvel Two-in-One #18, 38 (inks over Ron Wilson); #90 (inks over Alan Kupperberg) (1976–1982)
- Master of Kung Fu #55 (inks over Mike Zeck) (1977)
- My Love #4 (inks over Gene Colan) (1970)
- Ms. Marvel #4–8, 13, 15–18 (1977–1978)
- Mystery Tales #3, 40 (1952–1956)
- Mystic #7, 46 (1952–1956)
- Not Brand Echh #9 (1968)
- Omega the Unknown #1–10 (1976–1977)
- Our Love Story #18, 21 (full art); #4 (inks over Don Heck) (1970–1973)
- Planet of the Apes #5 (inks over Ed Hannigan)
- Power Man #38 (inks over Bob Brown); #53 (inks over Sal Buscema); #55 (inks over Lee Elias) (1976–1979)
- Pussycat #1 (1968)
- Questprobe #2 (inks over Al Milgrom) (1985)
- Rampaging Hulk #7 (inks over Keith Pollard) (1978)
- Sgt. Fury #96–97 (inks over Dick Ayers) (1972)
- Solarman #1 (1989)
- Son of Satan #1 (1975)
- The Spectacular Spider-Man #1–2, 11, 21, 23, 25–26, 29–34, 36–37, 41 (full art); #7 (inks over Sal Buscema); #39, 50 (inks over John Romita Jr.); #42 (inks over Mike Zeck); #49 (inks over Denys Cowan); #51, 54 (inks over Marie Severin); #52, 71 (inks over Rick Leonardi); #55, 68 (inks over Luke McDonnell); #56–57, 59 (inks over Jim Shooter); #60–62, 64, 66 (inks over Ed Hannigan); #63, 83 (inks over Greg LaRocque); #65, 74 (inks over Bob Hall); #73, 75–79, 81–82, 85–96 (inks over Al Milgrom); #97–99 (inks over Herb Trimpe); #102 (inks over Larry Lieber); Annual #1 (inks over Rich Buckler) (1977–1987)
- The Spectacular Spider-Man magazine #1–2 (1968)
- Spider-Man, Firestar and Iceman at the Dallas Ballet Nutcracker (1983)
- Spider-Man, Power Pack (1984)
- Spider-Woman #30–32 (inks over Steve Leialoha) (1980)
- Strange Tales #5, 10–12, 14, 59–60, 64 (full art); #174 (inks over John Buscema) (1952–1974)
- Strange Tales of the Unusual #9 (1957)
- Sub-Mariner #65–66 (full art); #24 (inks over John Buscema); #25, 32–35 (inks over Sal Buscema); #39 (inks over Ross Andru); #42 (inks over George Tuska); #44–45 (inks over Marie Severin); #60 (inks over Sam Kweskin); #68 (inks over Don Heck) (1970–1974)
- Super Rabbit Comics #3 (1945)
- Super-Villain Team-Up #4 (inks over Herb Trimpe) (1976)
- Suspense #24–25, 28 (1952–1953)
- Tarzan #22 (inks over Sal Buscema) (1979)
- Terry-Toons Comics #6, 9–10, 14, 16–17, 19, 21, 26, 30–31, 35, 41 (1943–1946)
- Thor #188, 201, 204, 215–216, 218 (inks over John Buscema); #214 (inks over Sal Buscema); 322, 324–325, 327 (inks over Alan Kupperberg) (1971–1983)
- Thundercats #1–6, 16, 19, 21 (1985–1988)
- Uncanny Tales #5, 48 (1952–1956)
- Unknown Worlds of Science Fiction #2 (inks over Frank Robbins) (1975)
- Vision and the Scarlet Witch #3–4 (inks over Richard Howell) (1985–1986)
- Web of Spider-Man #5, 10 (full art); #1–3 (inks over Greg LaRocque); #6 (inks over Mike Harris) (1985–1986)
- Werewolf by Night #7 (inks over Mike Ploog) (1973)
- What If ... ? #8 (inks over Alan Kupperberg); #30 (inks over Rich Buckler) (1978–1981)
- World of Fantasy #11–12, 14 (1958)
- Worlds Unknown #5 (inks over Dan Adkins) (1974)

Preceded by Al Plastino	"Supergirl" feature in Action Comics artist 1959–1968	Succeeded by Kurt Schaffenberger
Preceded by Don Heck	The Amazing Spider-Man artist 1968–1970	Succeeded by Gil Kane
Preceded by John Buscema	Man-Thing artist 1975-1980	Succeeded by Don Perlin
