= TVR Griffith =

British car model

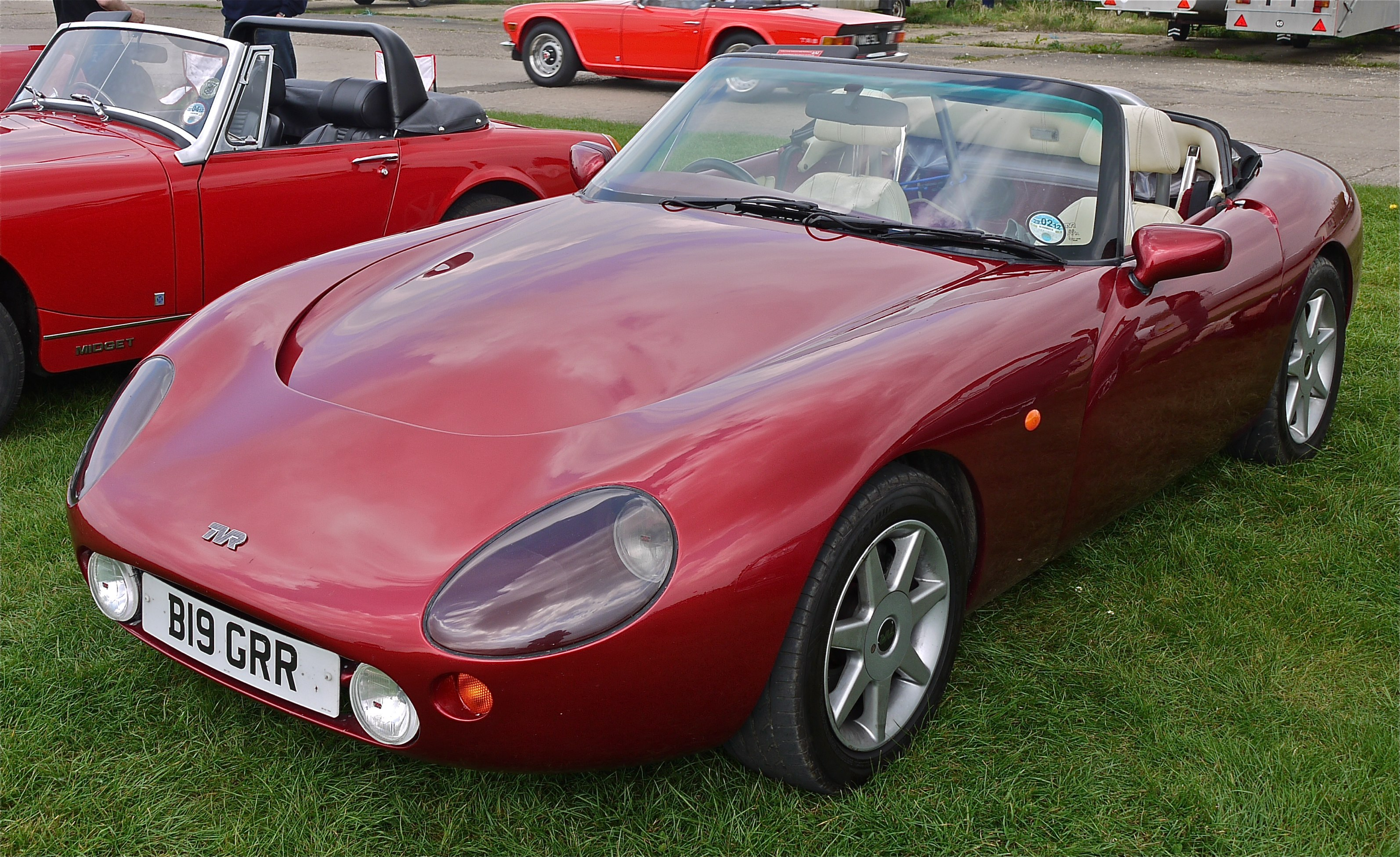
- TVR Griffith (first generation)

Overview
- Manufacturer: TVR Motor Company Limited; TVR Automotive Limited
- Production: 1990–2002
- Assembly: United Kingdom: Blackpool, England

Body and chassis
- Class: Sports car (S)
- Layout: Front-engine, rear-wheel-drive (1991–2002); Longitudinal-mounted, front mid-engine, rear-wheel drive (2018–present)

The TVR Griffith, later models being referred to as the Griffith 500, is a sports car designed and built by TVR, starting production in 1990, and ending production in 2002. As part of a 2017 attempt at reviving the TVR brand, a new generation Griffith was presented but never entered production.

== Earlier use of the name ==
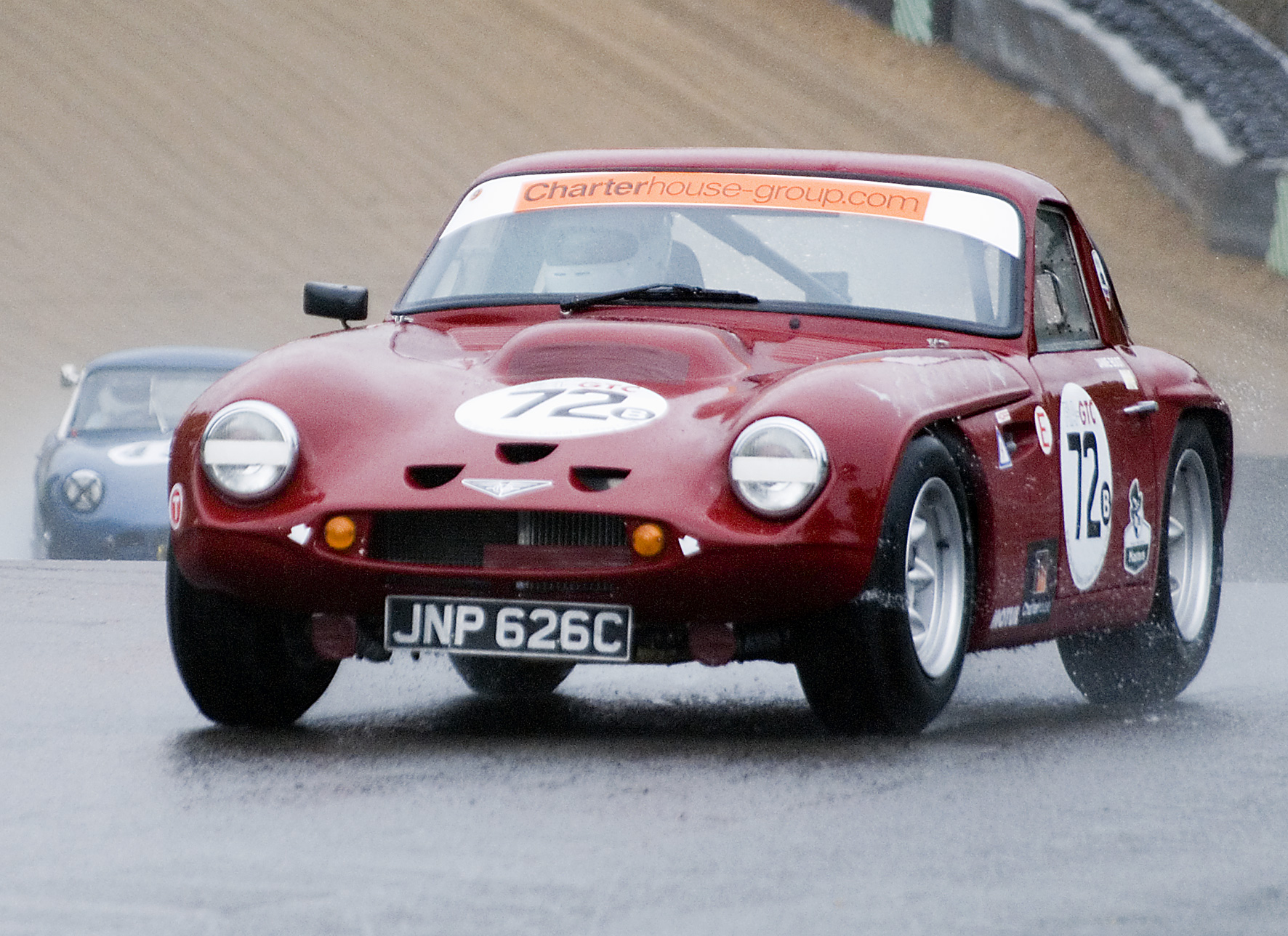
TVR Griffith 200

The TVR Griffith 200 was produced from 1963 to 1964 and the TVR Griffith 400 from 1964 to 1967.

== First generation (1990–2002) ==
First generation
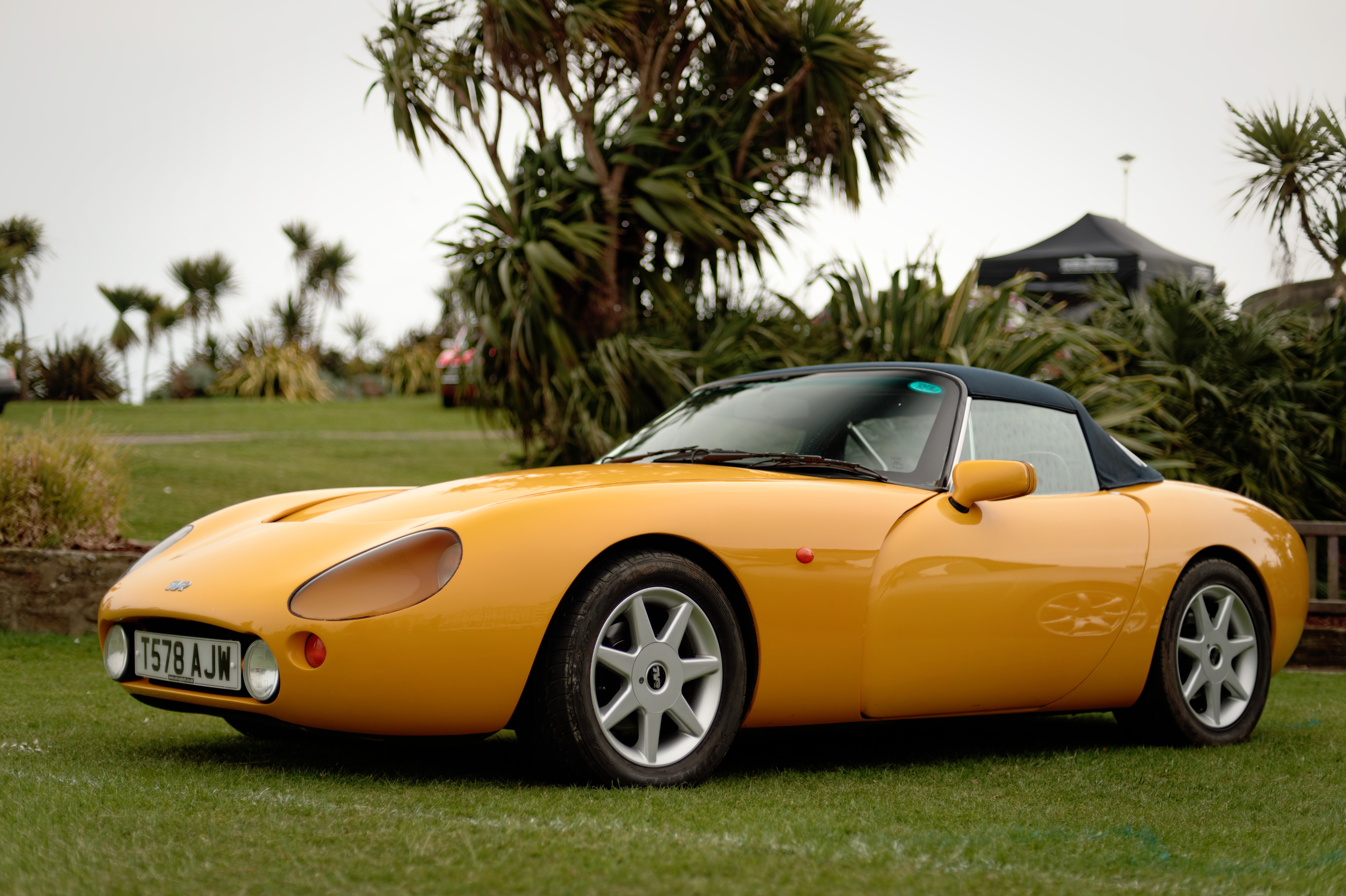

Overview
- Manufacturer: TVR Motor Company Limited
- Production: 1991–2002; 2,351 produced
- Designer: John Ravenscroft

Body and chassis
- Class: Sports car (S)
- Body style: 2-door roadster
- Platform: Fiberglass body over tubular steel chassis
- Related: TVR Chimaera; TVR Tuscan Speed Six; Melling Wildcat

Powertrain
- Engine: 4.0 L Rover V8; 4.3 L Rover V8; 4.5 L Rover V8; 5.0 L Rover V8 (Griffith 500 models only)
- Power output: 240 hp (179 kW; 243 PS) (4.0 L); 280 hp (209 kW; 284 PS) (4.3 L); 340 hp (254 kW; 345 PS) (5.0 L)
- Transmission: 5-speed Rover LT77 manual; 5-speed Tremec T5 manual

Dimensions
- Wheelbase: 2,286 mm (90.0 in)
- Length: 3,891 mm (153.2 in)
- Width: 1,720 mm (67.7 in)
- Height: 1,204 mm (47.4 in)
- Kerb weight: 1,060 kg (2,337 lb) (dry); 1,300 kg (2,866 lb)

Chronology
- Successor: TVR Tamora; TVR Griffith (second generation)

Like its forerunner namesakes, the Griffith 200 and Griffith 400, the modern Griffith was a lightweight (1,060 kg (2,337 lb)) fiberglass-bodied, 2-door, 2-seat sports car with a V8 engine. Originally, it used a 4.0 L 240 hp (179 kW; 243 PS) Rover V8 engine, but that could be optionally increased to 4.3 L 280 hp (209 kW; 284 PS) in 1992 with a further option of big-valve cylinder heads. In 1993, with a TVR-developed 5.0 L 340 hp (254 kW; 345 PS) version of the Rover V8 became available. All versions of the Griffith use the Lucas Industries 14CUX engine management system. All models use a five-speed manual transmission from Rover and TREMEC.

Although the Griffith was almost mechanically identical to its sister car, the Chimaera, it had a different body design and was produced in much smaller numbers.

The Griffith was a lightweight, high-power, and well-balanced car. A low-cost speed six Griffith proposal never became a production reality; by the time it was launched alongside the Griffith in 1999, it had morphed into the Tuscan Speed Six.

A special edition Japanese market Griffith 500 was made dubbed the Blackpool B340. This car was featured in Gran Turismo, Gran Turismo 2 (in the former as the Griffith 4.0 in the NTSC and PAL versions) and Driving Emotion Type-S. The car was similar to a normal Griffith 500 with some bespoke options available. The Japanese market also got a B275 4.0 engined car with aluminium basketweave dashboard.

In 2000, TVR announced that the Griffith production was going to end. A limited edition run of 100 Special Edition (SE) cars were to be built to mark the end of production. Although still very similar to the previous Griffith 500 model, the SE had a hybrid interior using the Chimaera dashboard and Cerbera seats. Noticeably, the rear lights were different along with different door mirrors, higher powered headlights and clear indicator lenses. Some also came with 16-inch wheels. Each car came with a numbered plaque in the glove box including the build number and a Special Edition Badge on its boot. All cars also had a unique signature in the boot under the carpet. The SEs were built between 2000 and 2002, with the last registered in 2003.

Every year, to celebrate the TVR Griffith, their owners have a meet called "The Griff Growl."

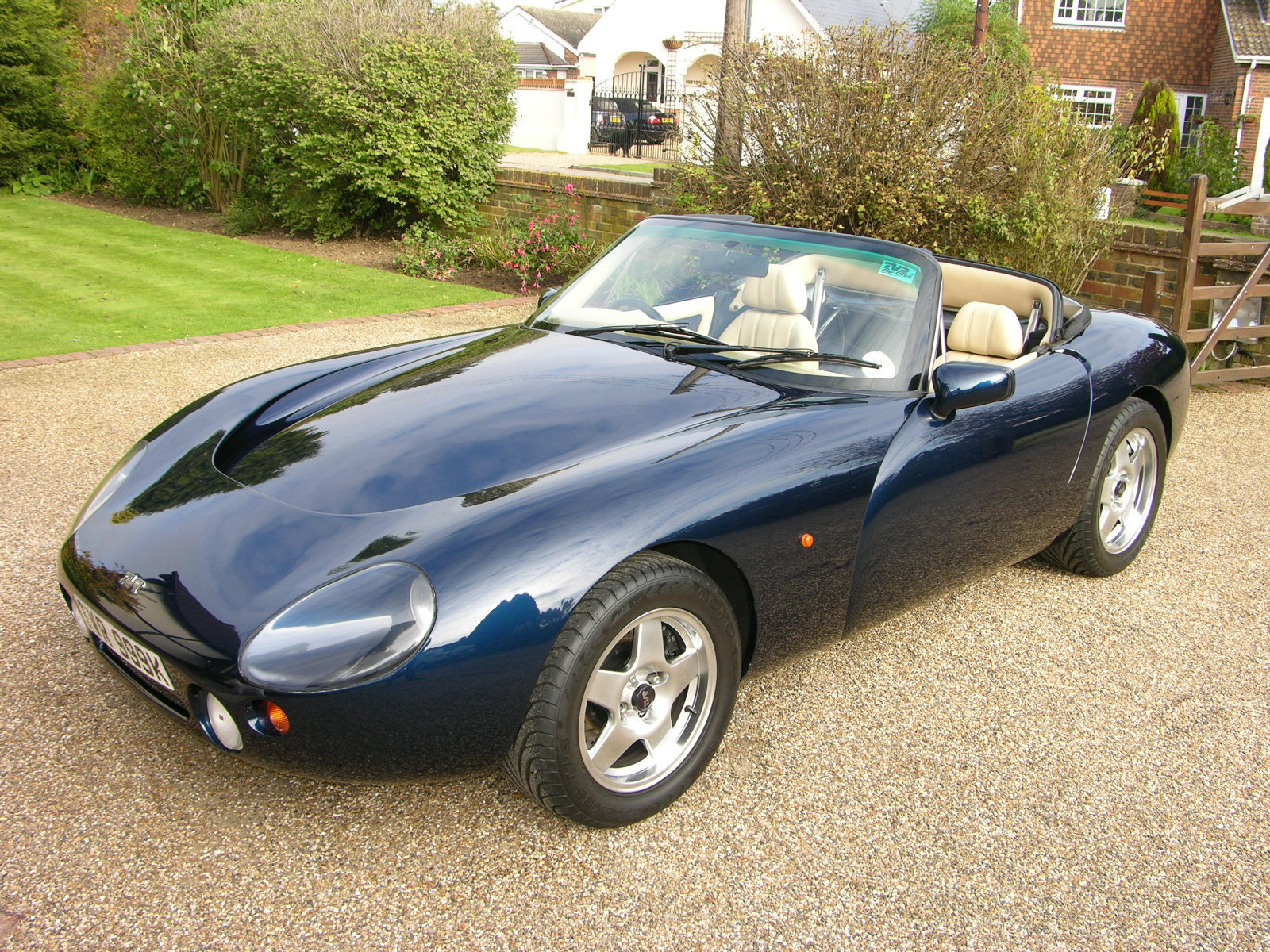
TVR Griffith 400

In 2008, Al Melling Sports Cars unveiled the Melling Wildcat, a roadster heavily based on the Griffith but powered by a variant of TVR's later AJP8 engine.

=== Specifications ===
Engine

Name: Rover alloy V8
Valvetrain setup: 2 valves per cylinder, overhead valve

Model	Displacement	Power	Torque	Max speed	0–97 km/h (0–60 mph) (seconds)	0–161 km/h (0–100 mph) (seconds)
4.0	3,950	240 hp (179 kW; 243 PS)	270 lb⋅ft (366 N⋅m) at 4000 rpm	245 km/h (152 mph)	4.7	12.1
4.0 HC	3,950 Hi-Lift Cam	275 hp (205 kW; 279 PS)	305 lb⋅ft (414 N⋅m)	254 km/h (158 mph)	4.7	12.1
4.3	4,280	280 hp (209 kW; 284 PS)	305 lb⋅ft (414 N⋅m) at 4000 rpm	254 km/h (158 mph)	4.6	11.3
4.5	4,495	285 hp (213 kW; 289 PS)	310 lb⋅ft (420 N⋅m)	254 km/h (158 mph)	4.6	
5.0	4,988	340 hp (254 kW; 345 PS)	350 lb⋅ft (475 N⋅m) (320 lb⋅ft (434 N⋅m) with catalyzer)	272 km/h (169 mph)	4.1	10.5

Transmission

Transmission: 5-speed manual (Rover LT77 or Tremec T5)

Suspension

Front: Independent, double wishbones, coil-over gas dampers, sway bars:
Rear: Independent, double wishbones, coil-over gas dampers, sway bars

Brakes

Front: 260 mm (10.2 in) ventilated disc brakes
Rear: 260 mm (10.2 in) ventilated disc brakes

Wheels

Front: 15 in aluminium alloy
Rear: 16 in aluminium alloy

Chassis/body

Body Panels: Glass fibre
Fuel Capacity: 57 Litres (12.5 Imp. gallons, 15.0 U.S. gal)
Weight: 1,060 kg (2,336 lb) (dry)
Length: 3,891 mm (153.2 in)
Height: 1,204 mm (47.4 in)
Width: 1,720 mm (67.7 in)
Wheelbase: 2,286 mm (90.0 in)
Front track: 1,461 mm (57.5 in)
Rear track: 1,471 mm (57.9 in)
Ground clearance: 145 mm (5.7 in)

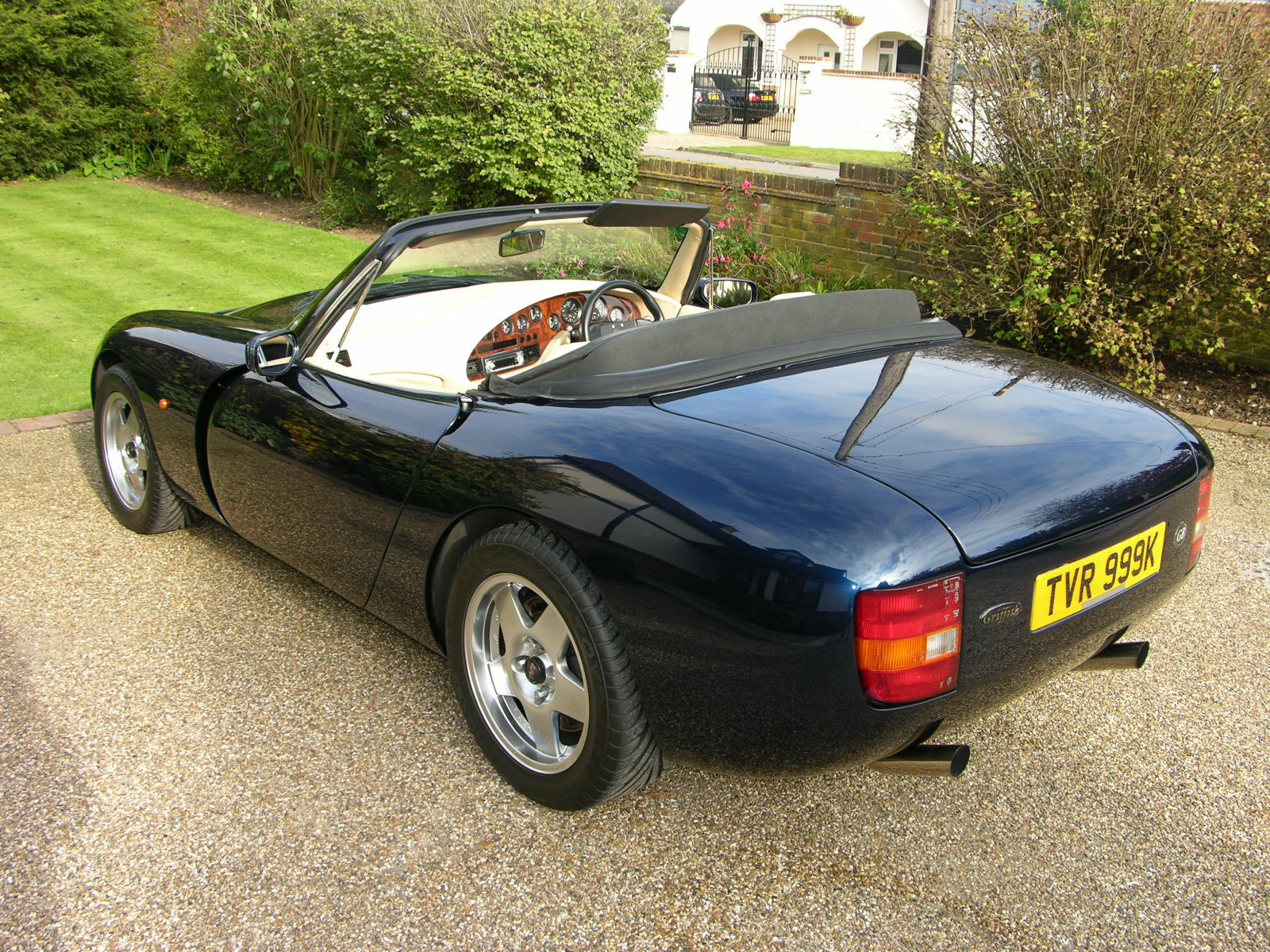
Rear third quarter view

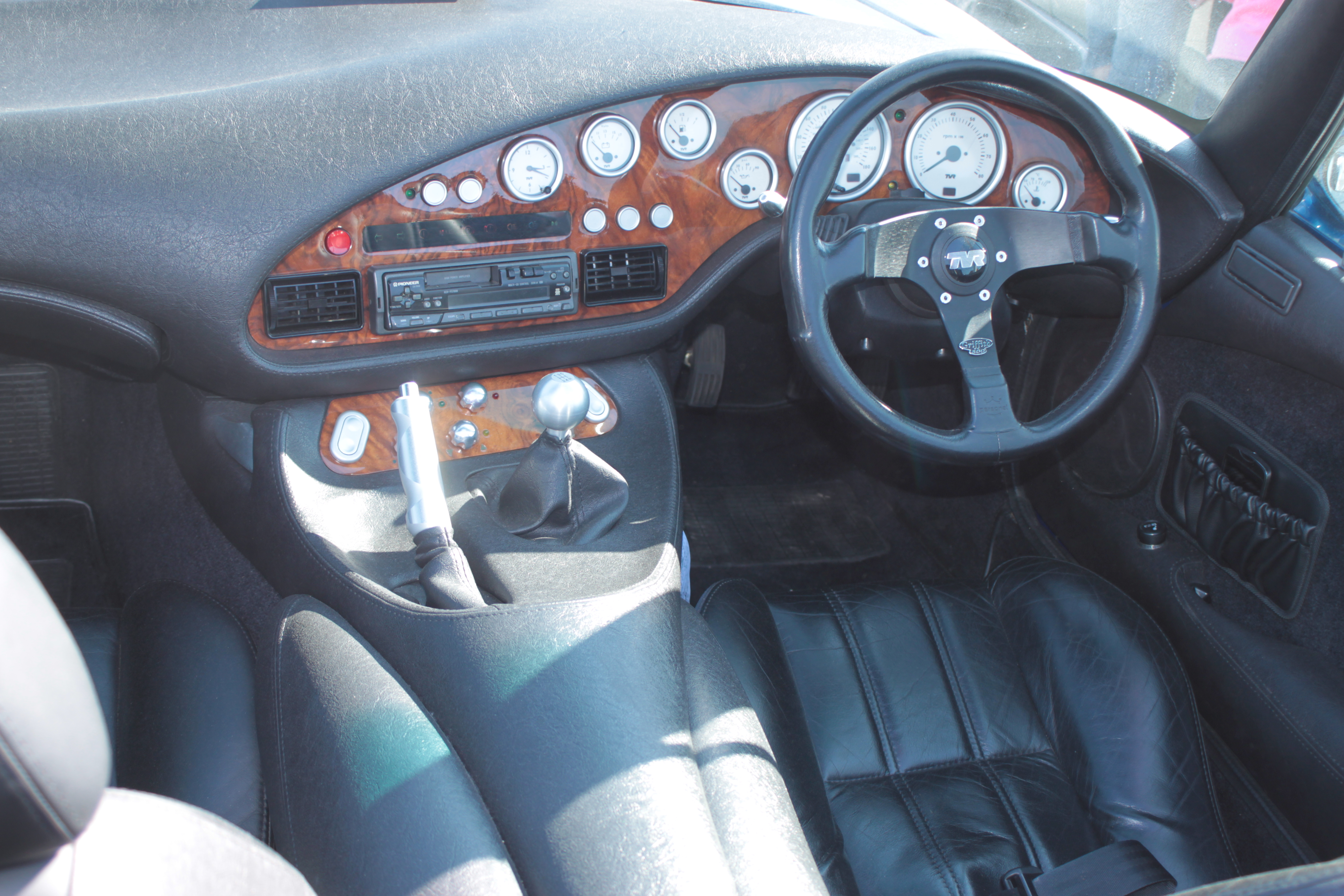
Interior

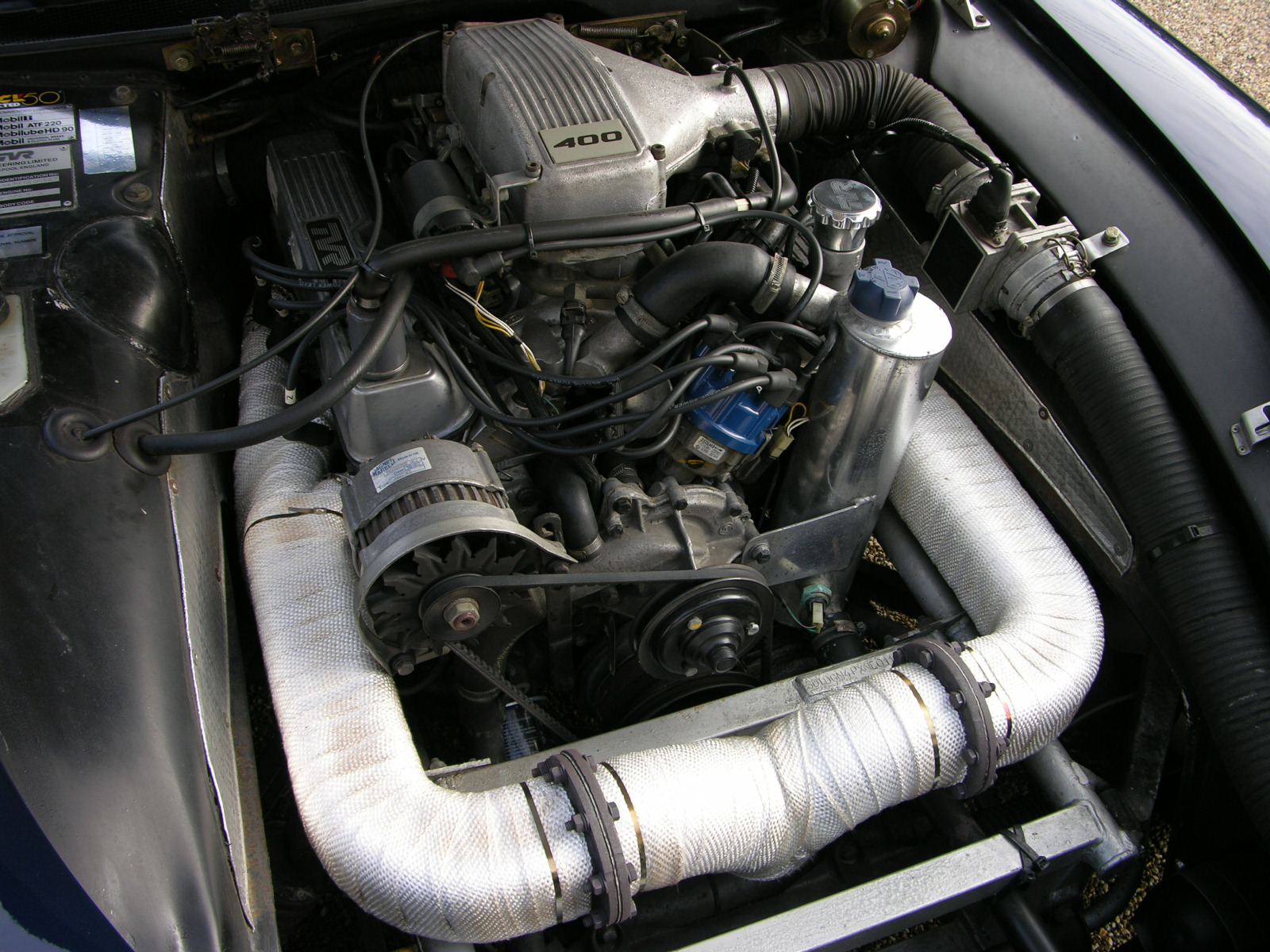
4.0 L V8 engine (Griffith 400)

== Second generation ==
Second generation (prototype)
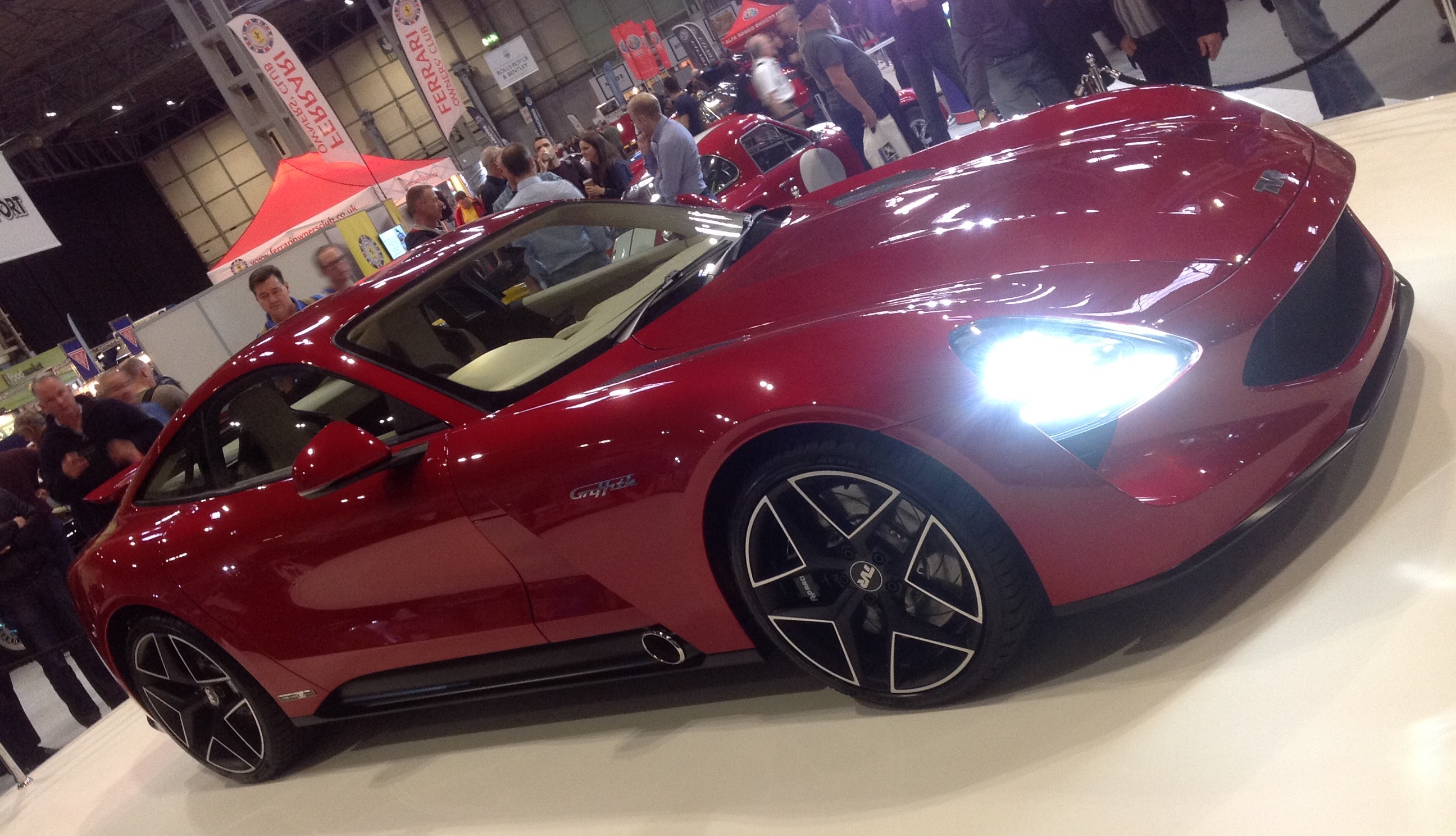
- TVR Griffith at NEC Classic Car Show in Birmingham 2017

Overview
- Manufacturer: TVR Automotive Limited
- Model years: 2017 (prototype)
- Assembly: United Kingdom: Whiteley, Hampshire, England
- Designer: Gordon Murray

Body and chassis
- Body style: 2-door coupé
- Layout: Longitudinal-mounted, front mid-engine, rear-wheel drive

Powertrain
- Engine: 5.0 L Cosworth Coyote V8

On 8 September 2017, to coincide with the marque's 70th anniversary year at the Goodwood Revival, a new Griffith prototype was revealed under the now resurrected TVR marque, featuring design work by Gordon Murray.

The Griffith was expected to start production in 2019, with an initial run of 500 Launch Edition (LE) cars and a price tag of £89,995. In November of 2021, EVO magazine reported that the new Griffith was yet to enter production and deliveries of completed vehicles were not expected until at least the end of 2023. EVO cited the COVID-19 pandemic, funding problems, and damage to production facilities had caused development of the vehicle to stall. In July 2024 EVO stated, "The first Griffiths had been scheduled for delivery in the latter half of 2023, but it now seems to be a matter of if – rather than when – the V8 sports car will ever become a reality."

== Production by year ==
- 1992: 602
- 1993: 230 (169 2DR + 61 500)
- 1994: 292
- 1995: 284
- 1996: 288
- 1997: 232
- 1998: 231
- 1999: 187
- 2000: 90
- 2001: 82
- 2002: 64
