= Al Melling =

British automobile engineer

Alwyn "Al" Melling is a British automobile engineer.

== Fashion design ==
At the beginning of the 1980s he was involved in the fashion industry, and owned a company in London throughout the 1980s which designed ladies' fashion garments. As owner he became interested in the whole lifecycle of garment production and learned how to make the garments himself. Melling has had ambitions to launch a brand. Melling's factory and company were based in Rochdale, Greater Manchester, however the launch of the Wildcat coincided with one of the worst recessions the automotive business has had. The company also had a major problem in finding employees with the level of skill to make the components: a problem which would have been solved by the purchase of TVR. At this point, in an attempt to turn the business around, Melling and his wife decided to move everything to the Autódromo Internacional do Algarve) in Portugal, where a deal was completed on factory space. Towards the end of negotiations his wife died.

== Norton ==
This project started when Melling was approached by an American, John Silseth II, who ran an investment brokerage business and was enthusiastic about motorbikes. He met someone in London who founded March racing cars – Robin Herd. Silseth suggested to him that he could get some manufacturers and a designer to make a world superbike using the March name: he then obtained the rights to it and decided it was perfect for the American market. Having done that he finalised a contract with Melling to design the engines for this range of superbikes and contacted a Formula One team to produce the bike. Melling's company went ahead and designed this range of engines, and after discussions with the Formula One team it became apparent that they were not capable of fulfilling their contract, and so this was transferred to the Melling team as well.

At this time, a real estate company run by the Aquilini family in Vancouver, who owned the rights to Norton motorcycles, approached Silseth to do a contract whereby the March bikes would carry the Norton name instead, and the Aquilini family would draw royalties from production sales. The deal was completed and a year later the centenary of Norton came round – 1998. It was suggested by Melling, who was the Technical Director of Norton and a major shareholder, having invested £4.5M – that a special design of the motorbike should be produced.

Originally Melling was commissioned to design four Norton motorcycles: the Manx, the Nirvana, the Buffalo and the Nemesis.

The 750cc in-line four motorcycle, to be called the Manx, was then on test – all the tooling having been completed. Melling suggested for the centenary that the new motorcycle should be a V8 – which was basically two 750cc joined in a V – becoming a 1500cc. It was also envisaged that this V8 engine could be made into a 2-litre engine, being ideal for small sports or racing cars.

However, Norton motors failed. There was a court case held for the appointment of blame in London. This was not attended by the certain two investors pulling out – and Melling was awarded all the rights of the project and possession of the tooling of the new Manx, Nirvana, Buffalo and Nemesis bikes.

The only prototype of the Nemesis ever built and a test engine are now on permanent display at the National Motorcycle Museum near Birmingham, England.

== Formula One ==
Melling became involved in Formula One in 1989 and subsequently worked as a consultant to companies such as Lamborghini, Chevrolet, Leyton House Formula One and Benetton.

Melling was involved with the development of an engine for the MasterCard Lola team for the 1997 season, but the new team folded after one race without running the engine. Some elements of the engine design were sold to Monte Carlo Automobile, and also to a company in America where that engine and the 4-valve Silk Cut Jaguar engine technology was used in design of the new Aston Martin V12.

== Rolls-Royce/Bentley bid ==
Melling was approached by Professor Donald Longmore, a keen fan of Rolls-Royce/Bentley. They came to an agreement, along with John Richards, that they would organise a consortium to finance a buyout bid of Rolls-Royce – this being offered for sale by the Vickers Group.

During the course of obtaining the funds the sale being operated by Lasard's of London, a business plan was organised by Melling for the future of the company. This was accepted by the consortium, and a meeting was arranged with the shareholders for the following Friday morning to put forward an offer. They were also informed that an offer was going to be made by BMW/VW, and another offer by Ford had already been rejected.

The overriding reason for the consortium was not just to try to keep the company under British ownership, but also that the owner would have control of the pricing of the luxury car market, and it was important to have that control in Britain.

It was all agreed and the funds were laid out in a Swiss bank where the consortium raised £550M, and the meeting with Lasard's and the shareholders was to have been at 11.30am on the following Friday morning. However, when they arrived at this time BMW/VW had already met with them, and their offer had been immediately accepted. This caused great consternation with not only the consortium, but many other influential people in Britain. After Melling's bid to secure Rolls-Royce lost out to a German buyer, he was asked by other members of his consortium to build a new luxury car that would be quintessentially British, and fill the void left by sale of Rolls-Royce/Bentley. Momentum gathered behind this idea as certain members of the British establishment, including a central member of the British nobility, gave their support. Melling proceeded to design the car, called the Melling Xavier, and make deals to form another technical consortium to fit the car, including Cartier, Asprey's and Alfred Dunhill. The project fell apart after some time, leaving Melling with a V12 engine which was completed and running, but could not be put to commercial use: he suffered hefty financial losses.

== Melling Consultancy Design, (MCD) ==
His team played a part in TWR's V12 engine which helped Jaguar win Le Mans four years on the run, and he has always wanted his own car in the world's most exciting road race. "The sale of the Hellcat would enable me to take a team to Le Mans but doing so has proved elusive" he said.

Rochdale based MCD designed the AJP8 and AJP6 which TVR developed into the TVR Speed Six engine – a high-torque, 24 valve canted straight six – which was cheaper to produce and more refined for road cars. Although TVR carried out further extensive in house development of the engines, these landmark power plants proved that MCD could finally produce an engine. MCD's work ranged from outboard motors and motorcycle engines to the still born Formula One engine. The F1 engine, which features four valves and three tiny MCD designed spark plugs per cylinder, fell behind in its schedule leading to the Mastercard Lola formula one team not qualifying for the 1997 season.

Melling and his team of draftsmen have tried F1 engine designs on several occasions. Working for Scott Russell Engines, a conventional 90-degree V8 was built and tested but never got into a Grand Prix car. Another design, purely on paper, was to have been a wide 165-degree angle V12 to be built with General Motors support but GM withdrew and the project died. The V10 design that was ultimately intended for the MasterCard Lola GP never appeared in 1997 leaving the team to run with customer Ford EC V8 engines. This project sank together with the Lola GP team in the beginning of 1997.

== 1175bhp 6-litre V10-powered sports car ==
Melling's concept, The Hellcat car is said to have 1175 hp delivered by a 6-litre V10 engine with the block and heads milled from solid billets of aluminium rather than cast. Taking influence from TVRs, the car is front-engined with rear-wheel-drive using a fibreglass monocoque body and box section steel chassis, independent wishbone suspension and a six speed trans-axle, from the Chevrolet Corvette. Its weight is estimated at 1,200 kg, with 60 mph (97 km/h) coming up in an F1-rivalling 2.8 seconds, and a Vmax of 200 mph-plus. Melling planned a GT1 version to challenge Aston Martins, Vipers and Corvettes at Le Mans in 2007. The cabin is race-inspired with deep bucket seats, harnesses and carbon trim. The plan was for only 50 a year to be produced in Rochdale, Greater Manchester, and sold through one national dealer. So far, the Hellcat and its power plant remain on the drawing board.

An early concept car made on the chassis of the TVR Cerbera and powered by a standard TVR AJP8, underwent tests in California, the biggest market being in the United States. Melling is quoted to have said: "A market survey revealed the Hellcat would look best in silver, so you can have it any colour – as long as it is silver."

At the launch of the "AJP8 Hellcat" code named JS1, Melling said: "The Hellcat would be the climax of my career – the car I've been working towards all my life. One day, God willing, one of my designs will be in production"

== Melling Wildcat ==
The Melling Wildcat is a high performance roadster. The first prototype was completed in 2008 and production is scheduled in America and the UK in 2009. The Wildcat is powered by either the 4.5-litre AJP8 V8 producing 440BHP or a tuned 5.7-litre version of the Chevrolet small-block V8 producing over 450 bhp (340 kW). Its styling is similar to the TVR Griffith. Initially a proposed 150 units was supposed to be completed per year, with production starting in 2009; but this did not happen, and only 7 were built.

== Cruiser bikes ==
The smaller of the bikes, The Monos (which is Greek for 'The Only One'), has an engine size of approximately 2.5 litres. The Titan, a copy of a bike that Melling had initially made for himself, where he sculpted the cylinders of the engine to look like the American fighter planes of the Second World War.

Melling had a contract to redesign the Indian Motorcycle engine in America. Subsequently, his company began production on this range of heavy cruiser motorcycles similar to Viper/Indian/Harley Davidson.
