= Melling Wildcat =

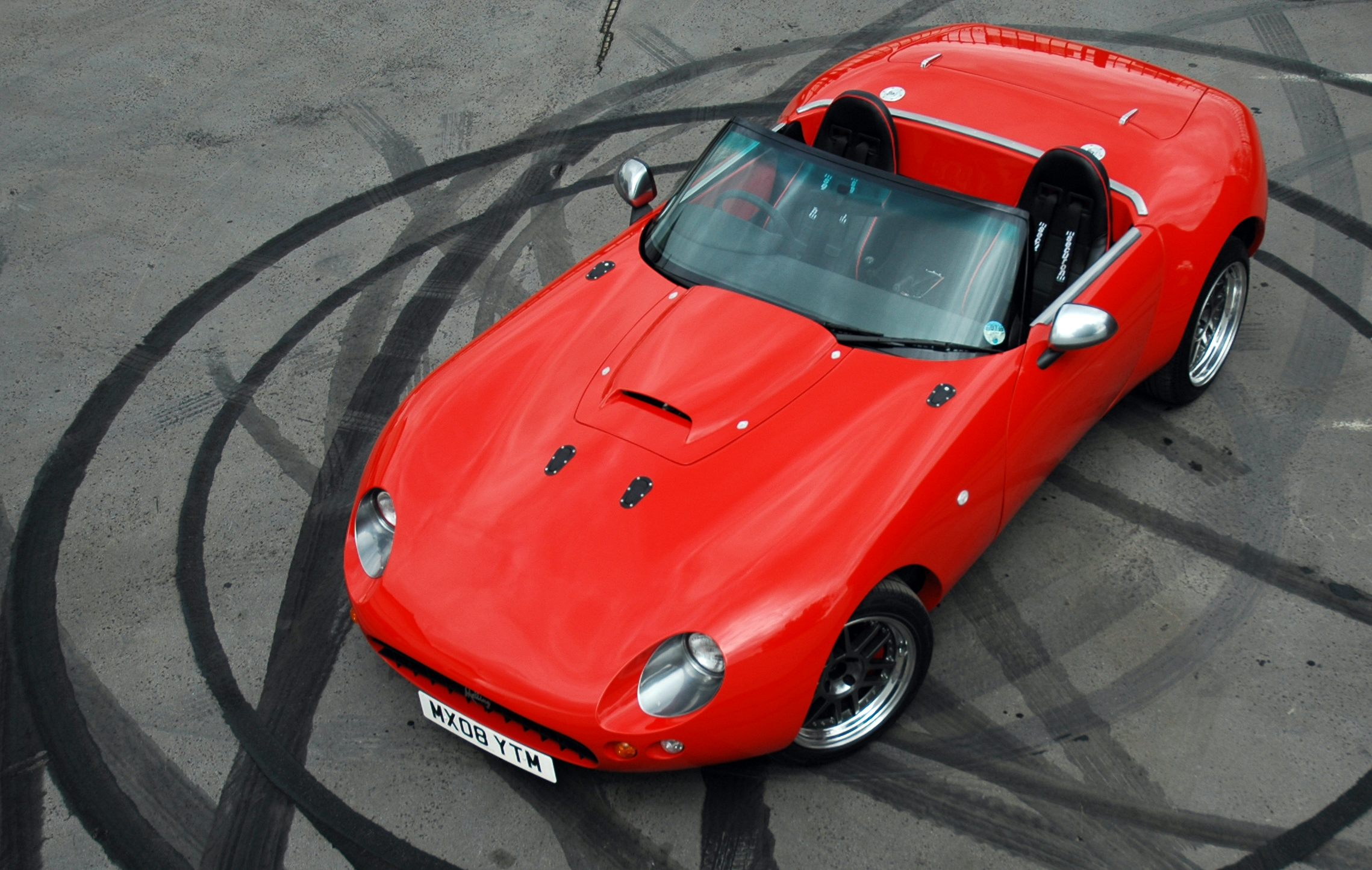

Overview
- Manufacturer: Al Melling Sports Cars
- Production: 2008–2014 (7 produced)
- Assembly: Rochdale, England
- Designer: Al Melling, Chris Stallard

Body and chassis
- Class: Sports car (S)
- Body style: 2-door roadster
- Layout: FR layout
- Platform: Fibreglass body over Box-section steel chassis with built in roll hoops and side-intrusion protection
- Related: TVR Griffith (First Generation)

Powertrain
- Engine: 5.7 L LS6 V8; 4.5 L AJP8 V8
- Transmission: 5-speed Tremec T-5 manual 6-speed Tremec TR-6060 manual

Dimensions
- Wheelbase: 2,286 mm (90.0 in)
- Length: 3,942 mm (155.2 in)
- Width: 1,821 mm (71.7 in)
- Height: 1,204 mm (47.4 in)
- Curb weight: 2,200 lb (998 kg)

The Melling Wildcat is a V8 powered sports car produced by Al Melling Sports Cars in Rochdale, Greater Manchester.

== History ==
The Wildcat was conceived to fill the gap left by defunct British marques such as TVR, Marcos and others. Designed to strike a balance between high performance, low cost, and adaptability for possible future legislative changes, the first running prototype car was made in only nine months and appeared in Autocar in August 2008. Initially a proposed 150 units were supposed to be completed per year, with production starting in 2009; this did not happen.

The Wildcat has been noted as sharing a resemblance to the TVR Griffith.

== Construction ==
The Wildcat has a variety of engine choices, but the standard fit is a 4.5 litre Melling V8; a modern, redeveloped version of the AJP8 used in the TVR Cerbera. Other engines can be specified including the GM LS-series, BMW V8s and the Dodge Viper V10.

The Wildcat is available with a five or six speed Tremec manual gearbox mated to a live rear axle with a rear limited slip differential; independent rear suspension may be specified when ordering. A 2.8:1 axle ratio is fitted as standard, but other ratios are possible. The driveline claimed to accept up to 1000 bhp. The chassis is a box section steel structure with built-in roll and side impact protection. The fully adjustable suspension includes front double unequal length wishbones, and a rear live axle with four locating links. Brakes are front and rear ventilated discs with four pot calipers. It has rack and pinion steering with 2.9 turns from lock to lock, and may be powered or unpowered.

=== Technical specifications ===
Top speed: 180 mph (2.65:1 final drive ratio) or 150 mph (3:1 final drive ratio)
0-62 mph: 3.2 seconds (3:1 final drive ratio), or 3.5 (2.65:1 final drive ratio)
Kerb weight: 998 kg
Engine: 4500cc V8
Installation: Front, longitudinally mounted, rear wheel drive
Power: 448 bhp at 7200 rpm
Torque: 407 lb ft at 5200 rpm
Gearbox: 6 speed manual
Wheels: 17in/18in alloy (front/rear)
Tyres: 245/25x17 (front), 255x490x18 (rear)
Price: £50,000 (base)
