= Lucas 14CUX =

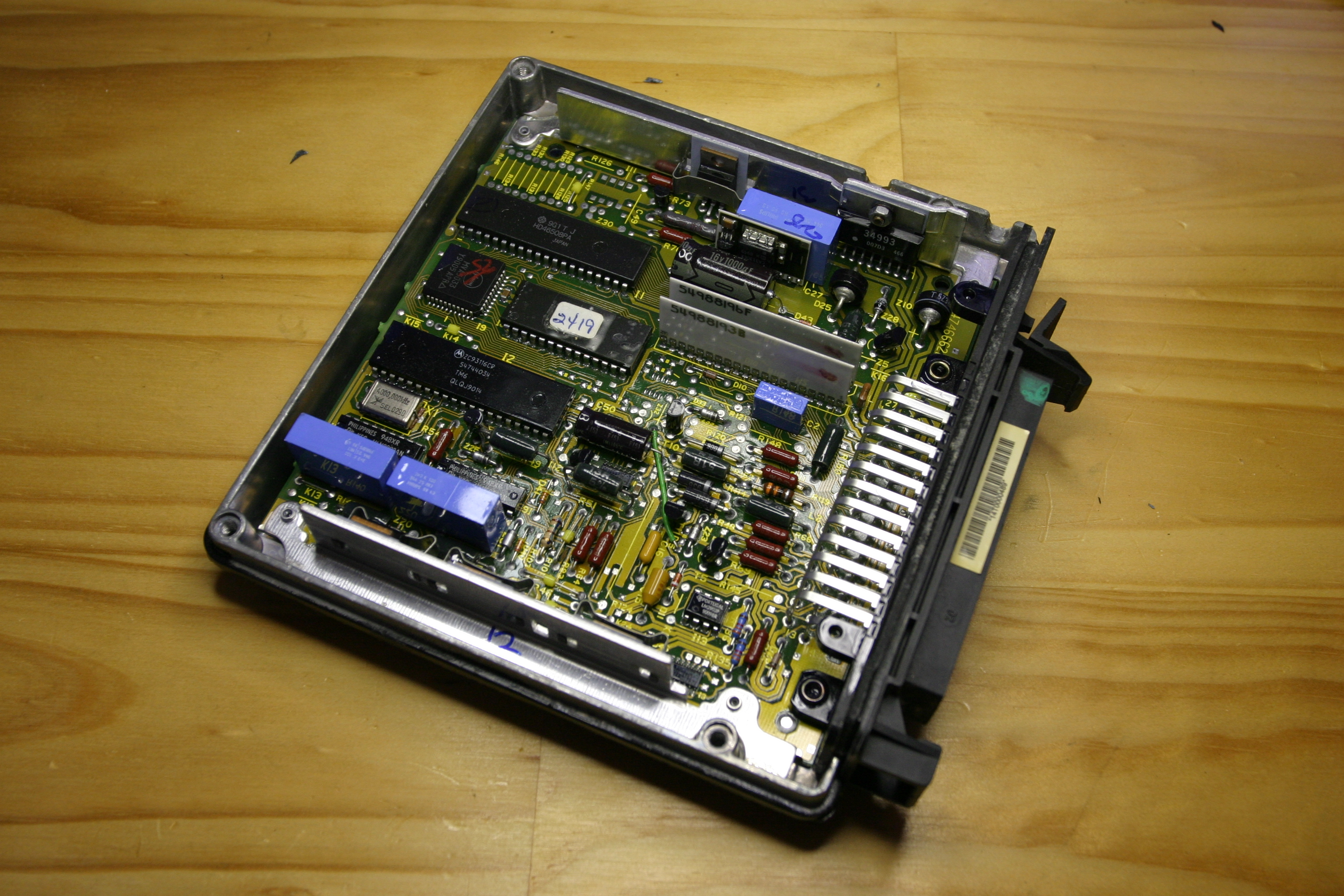
- Main printed circuit board of the Lucas 14CUX
- Manufacturer: Lucas Industries
- Type: Electronic automobile engine management
- Released: 1990
- Predecessor: Lucas 13CU / 14CU
- Successor: Lucas/SAGEM GEMS 8 Bosch Motronic ML2.1

The Lucas 14CUX (sometimes referred to as the Rover 14CUX) is an automotive electronic fuel injection system developed by Lucas Industries and fitted to the Rover V8 engine in Land Rover vehicles between 1990 and 1995. The system was also paired with the Rover V8 by a number of low-volume manufacturers such as TVR, Marcos, Ginetta, and Morgan.

The system is also sometimes referred to as the "Rover Hot-Wire" or "Hitachi Hot-Wire", in reference to the style of airflow sensor it uses (and the sensor's manufacturer, Hitachi).

== History ==
In the mid-1980s, Lucas developed the 13CU system by revising the Bosch L-Jetronic system and adding an electronic diagnostics capability to comply with California Air Resources Board requirements. The design of the 13CU also deviated from the original L-Jetronic design in that it used a hot-wire air mass sensor rather than the Jetronic's mechanical flap sensor.

The 13CU was further developed into the 14CU, which had (among other changes) an ECU that was more physically compact. The 14CU was used in US-market Range Rovers in 1989. Both the 13CU and 14CU were designed for use with only the 3.5L version of the Rover V8.

The 14CUX was the final iteration of the system, and featured upgraded injectors and (for some markets) an external diagnostic display. It also introduced the use of a "tune resistor", which is an external resistor that plugs into the harness and is sensed by the ECU to select one of five different sets of fueling data.

== Hardware ==
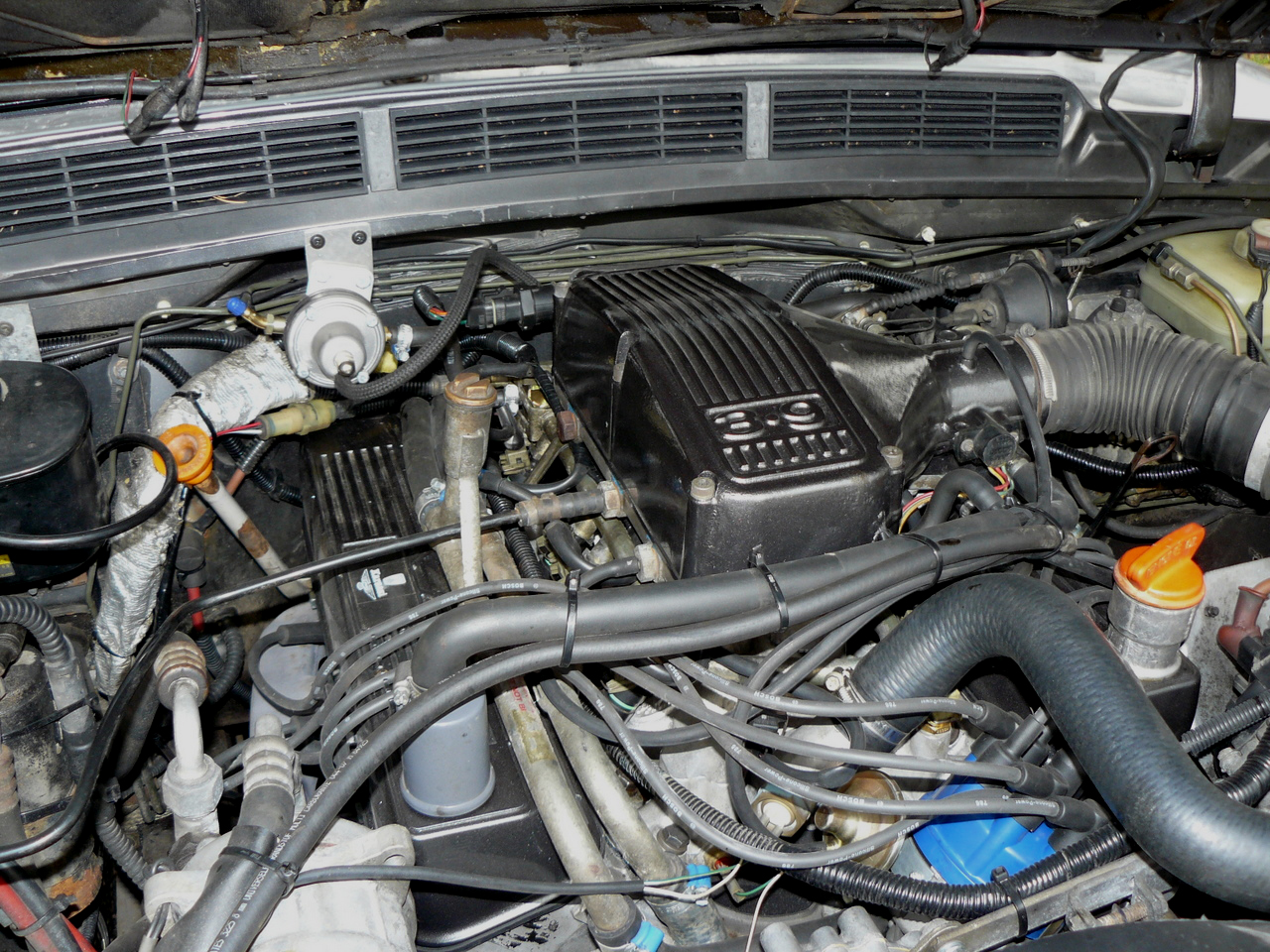
A Rover V8 3.9L engine fitted with the 14CUX system

The engine control unit (ECU) of the 14CUX system is run by a Motorola MC6803U4 8-bit microprocessor, which is an uncommon variant of the otherwise ubiquitous 6803. The processor is not labeled as an MC6803U4 in the ECU, instead being given a proprietary part number. The 14CUX determines fueling values for each bank of the V8 separately, which requires the use of two dedicated timer outputs for independent control of the fuel injectors. This requirement helped to drive the selection of the MC6803U4 part, which has three timer outputs available (in contrast to the single timer output on the standard 6803.)

Minor design updates were made to the ECU through its life, with the earlier units given the part-number prefix "PRC" and the later units "AMR".

The code and data used by the microprocessor is stored in either a 27C128 or 27C256 EPROM (depending on the revision of the ECU), which is soldered in place on most PRC units and socketed in some late PRC units as well as AMR units. Only half of the 32KB PROM space is used, so the code/data image appears twice, duplicated in the upper half.

== Function ==
In contrast to more modern engine management systems, the 14CUX controls fuel delivery only; it does not control spark ignition. On 14CUX-equipped vehicles, the spark control is done mechanically with the use of a distributor.

When the ignition is first turned on, the ECU energizes a relay that runs the fuel pump for a short time to pressurize the fuel rail. Once the starter motor begins to turn the engine, the ECU gets a 12VDC signal that causes it to run the fuel pump again, and energize the fuel injectors. For the next several seconds, the injector pulse width is wider than normal to provide sufficient fuel for starting. Idle control is performed by adjusting a stepper-motor-driven bypass valve in the intake plenum. When the ignition is switched off, the ECU winds the bypass valve fully open to provide enough air the next time the engine is started.

To determine the amount of fuel required by the engine, the ECU reads a number of sensors measuring the following factors:

- Intake air mass
- Coolant temperature
- Engine speed
- Throttle position
- Fuel temperature
- Exhaust oxygen content (narrowband)
- Road speed

The intake air mass is measured with a "hot-wire" mass airflow sensor: drawn in by intake manifold vacuum, air moves past an electrically heated wire filament, and the degree to which the filament is cooled indicates the mass of the airstream.

Two factors (crankshaft speed and engine load) are used to index into a two-dimensional matrix of numeric values known as the "fuel map". The value read from the map is offset by other environmental factors (such as coolant temperature). This corrected value is then used to meter fuel by pulse-width modulating the fuel injectors. Because each bank of the V8 feeds an exhaust line with its own oxygen sensor, the air/fuel ratio can be monitored and controlled for the banks independently.

The 14CUX PROM may contain up to five fuel maps, which allowed a single ROM image to contain maps for multiple target markets. In some markets, the active map is selectable by placing an external tune resistor on a particular pin of the ECU. This external map selection was disabled in the code for North American specification (NAS) vehicles.

=== Open loop ===
Above a certain engine speed or throttle position, the ECU switches to "open-loop" mode; the inputs from the exhaust lambda sensors are ignored and the mixture is enriched beyond stoichiometric for higher power and decreased engine wear.

In addition to engine speed and load conditions triggering open-loop mode, the selection of the fuel map also may force this mode. For certain fuel maps, the 14CUX firmware fuels in open-loop mode under all running conditions.

== Diagnostics ==
The design of the 14CUX was done well in advance of the requirement (for the 1996 model year) that all passenger vehicles sold in the United States support OBD-II. As a result, the diagnostics information collected by the 14CUX is not accessible via an OBD-II-compliant interface. In lieu of an industry-standard diagnostic interface, the 14CUX is able to communicate over a serial link at non-standard voltage levels and baud rate. The reference clock for the UART runs at 1 MHz and the clock divisor is set to 128, which produces a data rate of 7812.5 baud. The serial interface allows reading and writing arbitrary memory locations via a simple software protocol. Because the value from a given sensor is always stored at the same location in RAM, these sensor values can be read if the memory location is known.

The 14CUX is capable of storing diagnostic trouble codes in a 32-byte segment of its internal memory that is maintained (even while vehicle ignition is off) by applying 5VDC (regulated down from 12VDC from the vehicle's battery.) Because of this maintainer voltage, the ECU is always drawing a small amount of current. Fault codes can be cleared by disconnecting the battery for a short period of time. Diagnostic trouble codes can be retrieved from the ECU via a small electronic display referred to as the "Fault Code Display Unit". This unit contains two seven-segment displays that together show a single two-digit fault code. When connected to the 14CUX wiring harness, the ECU detects its presence and reconfigures the RDATA and TDATA lines to work as an I2C link to this device.

== Applications ==
In addition to the Land Rover Discovery, Defender, and Range Rover, the 14CUX was used with the Rover V8 in the TVR Griffith and its sister car, the Chimaera. In the TVR applications, engines as large as 5.0L were offered; these larger displacements required the development of new fuel maps for the engine to run properly.

Between 1990 and 1993, Ginetta produced the G33 roadster, which used the 3.9L Rover V8 and 14CUX.

For model year 1996, Land Rover chose to discontinue use of the 14CUX in its products and instead used GEMS ("Generic Engine Management System"), which had been developed jointly by Lucas and SAGEM. This was done in part due to the requirement for OBD-II in the United States market. Some automakers whose products were not exported to North America (such as TVR) continued to use the 14CUX until the later discontinuation of the Rover V8 engine.

== Main connector pin assignments ==
The ECU interfaces with the rest of the system via a 40-pin connector. When observing the connector on the ECU box itself, with the thumb latch on the left, the numbering for the connector's pins starts at 1 in the lower left-hand corner. The pin numbering continues to the right, then in an S-shape through the two other pin rows.

Pinout of the 40-pin ECU connector
Pin	Color	Name	Description/Notes
1	red/green	Air bypass valve	48-58Ω to pin 26
2	brown/orange	MAF and main relay	Input (+12VDC)
3	yellow	Throttle position sensor	5kΩ to pin 25
4	black	Ground	O2 sensor heater return (Lambda ground)
5	gray/black	Tune resistor	Some NAS vehicles do not have a pin at this position
6	yellow (or yellow/pink)	Speed transducer	To main connector (0-12V six times per revolution)
7	green/blue	Coolant temperature sensor	To brown connector
8	purple/yellow	Heated front screen	Input from main connector
9	white/light green	Diagnostic serial port	Output to 5-pin TTS connector
10	black/yellow or red	EFI warning light	Output to main connector
11	yellow/white	Even (right) bank injectors	Output
12	blue/red	Main relay	Output to main relay coil
13	yellow/blue	Odd (left) bank injectors	Output
14	black	ECM ground	-
15	brown	Ignition and main relay	Input (+12VDC always applied)
16	blue/purple	Fuel pump relay	Output to fuel pump relay coil
17	gray/yellow	Purge control valve	Output
18	white/pink	Diagnostic serial port	Input from 5-pin TTS connector
19	white/gray or white/green	Fuel pump and inertia switch	Input (+12VDC when ignition on)
20	red	Throttle potentiometer	Swings 0.29 to 5.00 VDC
21	yellow/black to yellow/green	Air conditioner compressor load	Input
22	blue/red	MAF sensor (idle trim)	-
23	unk	Left lambda sensor	Blue shielded
24	unk	Right lambda sensor	Blue shielded
25	red/black	Sensor ground	Ground side of coolant, fuel, MAP, and TP sensors
26	green/white	Air bypass valve	48-58Ω to pin 1
27	black/gray	Signal ground	-
28	blue/gray	Air bypass valve	48-58Ω to pin 29
29	orange	Air bypass valve	48-58Ω to pin 28
30	pink	Fault display data	Output to main connector
31	black/green or black/yellow	Diagnostic plug	Input
32	gray/white	Fuel temperature thermistor	Input from gray connector
33	black/gray	A/C compressor clutch relay output	-
34	orange/black	Transmission neutral switch	Input from main connector
35	blue/green	MAF sensor	0.3 to 0.6 VDC with ignition on
36	black/green	Condenser fan timer	Tall green unit (AMR 3678)
37	(n/a)	(no connection)	-
38	brown/pink	Fault display data	Output to main connector
39	white/black or white/blue	Engine speed (ignition spark input)	Harness includes 6.8KΩ resistor
40	black	ECM ground	-
