= Hellcat =

Hellcat or The Hell Cat may refer to:

== Arts and entertainment ==
=== Film ===
- The Hell Cat (1918 film)
- The Hellcat, a 1928 British silent film
- The Hell Cat (1934 film)
- The Hellcats, a 1967 outlaw biker film, featured on the television series Mystery Science Theater 3000
- Hellcats (film), a 2008 South Korean film
- Hellcat (2025 film), a 2025 horror film directed by Brock Bodell and featuring James Austin Johnson

=== Television ===
- "Hellcat", a 1966 episode of Iron Horse (TV series)
- Hellcats, a 2010 TV series starring Alyson Michalka
- AKA Hellcat, an episode in the third season of Marvel's Jessica Jones (2019)

=== Music ===
- Hellcat, a guitar made by Schecter Guitar Research
- Hellcat Records, an American record label based in California
- Hellcat (EP), 2009, by Meisa Kuroki
- "Hell-Cat", a song by Scorpions from the 1976 album Virgin Killer

=== Other entertainment ===
- Hellcat (comics), the code name of Patsy Walker, a Marvel Comics character
- Hellcat (Dungeons & Dragons), a type of evil creature related to devils
- Hellcat (roller coaster), at Clementon Park and Splash World in New Jersey
- Hellcats over the Pacific, 1991 combat flight simulation game for the Macintosh

== Military / firearms ==
- Grumman F6F Hellcat, the primary US Navy aircraft carrier fighter in the second half of World War II
- M18 Hellcat, a US tank destroyer used in World War II
- 12th Armored Division (United States), nicknamed the Hellcat Division (or Hellcats for short)
- Short Hellcat, a planned air-to-surface variant of the Seacat missile
- Springfield Armory Hellcat, a 9mm pistol sold by Springfield Armory, Inc

== Transport ==
- Chrysler Hemi Hellcat, a supercharged engine option of the following vehicles
  - Dodge Charger SRT Hellcat
  - Dodge Challenger SRT Hellcat
  - Dodge Durango SRT Hellcat
  - Jeep Grand Cherokee SRT Trackhawk
  - Ram 1500 TRX
- Melling Hellcat, a sports car

== Other uses ==
- Mary Todd Lincoln, nicknamed "Hellcat"
- Hellcat Swamp, a section of the Parker River National Wildlife Refuge

== See also ==
- "The Cat from Hell", a short story by Stephen King
