= Melling Hellcat =

Overview
- Manufacturer: Melling Sportscars
- Production: 2012 (planned); 20-30 cars per year planned

Body and chassis
- Class: Sports car
- Body style: 2-door FMR-RWD coupe

Powertrain
- Engine: 6.0 L Quad-Turbo V10
- Transmission: 6-speed dual-clutch sequential manual

Dimensions
- Wheelbase: 2,685 mm (105.7 in)
- Length: 4,437 mm (174.7 in)
- Width: 1,913 mm (75.3 in)
- Height: 1,065 mm (41.9 in)

The Melling Hellcat is a concept sports car designed by Al Melling to be the fastest street legal car in the world. It was introduced in February 2007 and was scheduled to come out in 2012. The car is powered by a 6.0 litre quad-turbo V10 engine giving it 1,217 hp (908 kW), higher than that of the fastest street-legal car at the time, the Bugatti Veyron Super Sport.

The prototype of this car was produced in 2006. As of July 2019, the car is still not in production, and is presumed cancelled.

== Specifications ==
- Engine: 6.0 litre v10
- Induction: 4 turbos
- Intake cooling: 2 intercoolers
- Power: 1,217 bhp (908 kW)
- Torque: 880 ft⋅lbf (1,190 N⋅m)
- Claimed top speed: 475 km/h (295 mph)

== In the media ==
BBC television's Top Gear ran a short segment on the Hellcat in their Season 9 Episode 4 show. Presenter James May commented that he doubted if the car's drag coefficient would be low enough ("slippery enough") to reach the claimed top speed. In addition, the prototype's weight is prohibitive of it reaching the claimed top speed.

The prototype was also digitised and featured as the centre-piece of the racing video game Juiced 2.
