= TVR Griffith 200 =

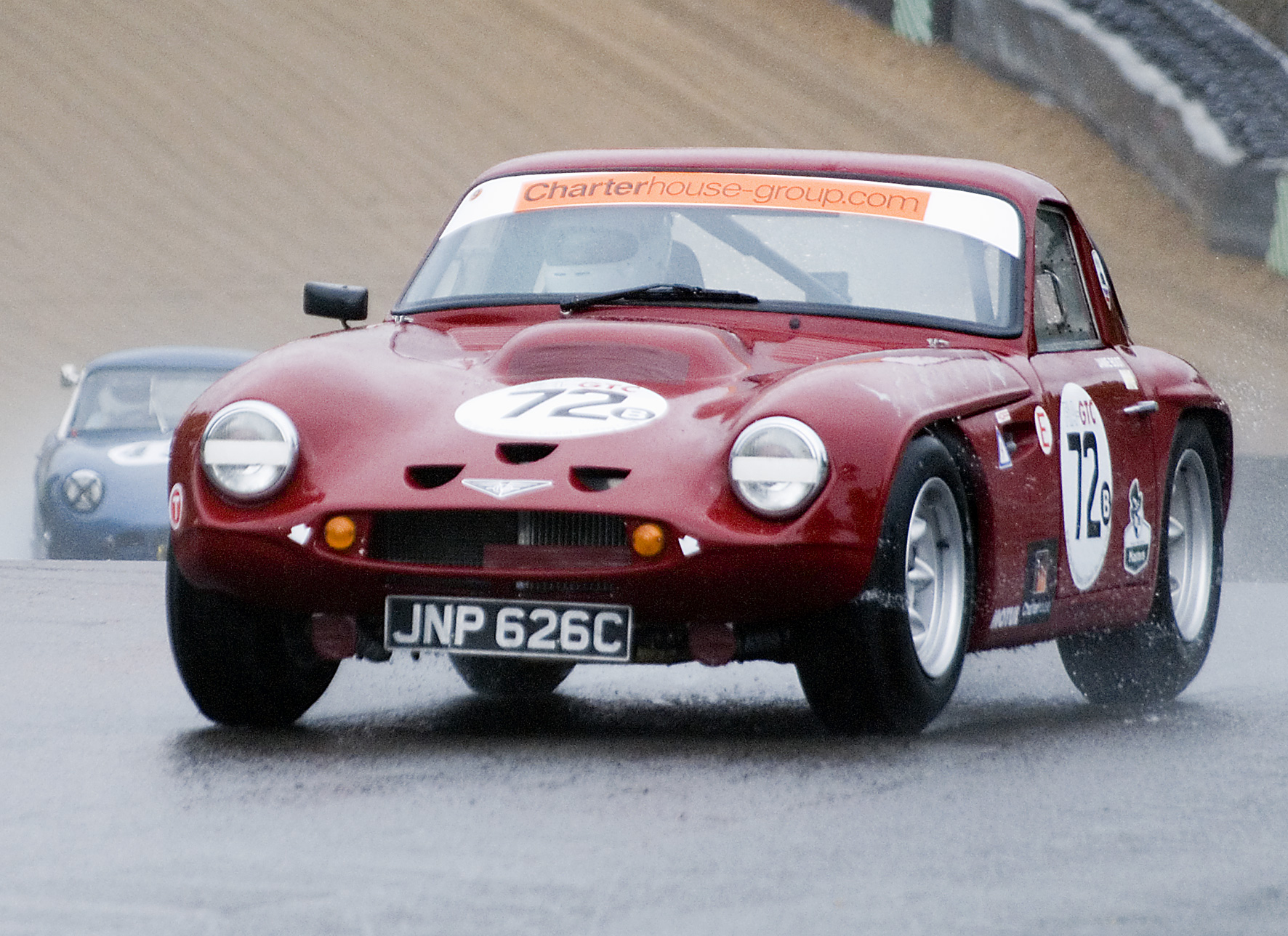
- A TVR Griffith 200 at Brands Hatch

Overview
- Manufacturer: TVR
- Also called: Griffith Series 200

Powertrain
- Engine: Ford Windsor

The TVR Griffith 200 (or Griffith Series 200) was a lightweight fibreglass-body sports car. In the United States, the make was Griffith and the model was Griffith Series 200, whilst the United Kingdom the make was TVR and the model was Griffith 200.

== Origin ==
Jack Griffith came up with the idea for the car in 1964, and secured rights to market the cars in the US. Griffith ran a car repair workshop in the US for patrons such as Gerry Sagerman and Mark Donohue who had both driven a TVR Grantura at Sebring International Raceway in 1962. The concept for the Griffith Series 200 originated during a dinner with Carroll Shelby, where Griffith declared he could build a car that could outperform an AC Cobra.

Griffith's first attempt was to put the Ford V8 engine from Mark Donohue's AC Cobra into a TVR Grantura. While this did not work, the idea prompted further conversations. Griffith wanted TVR to supply him with modified TVR Grantura chassis, without an engine or transmission, and TVR complied with his request.

In an effort to get the engine and gearbox to fit, some of the Grantura's chassis was removed, and various other parts of the chassis were simply hammered until the powertrain elements fit. The brakes remained stock, but the car was fitted with slightly wider tyres.

== Production ==
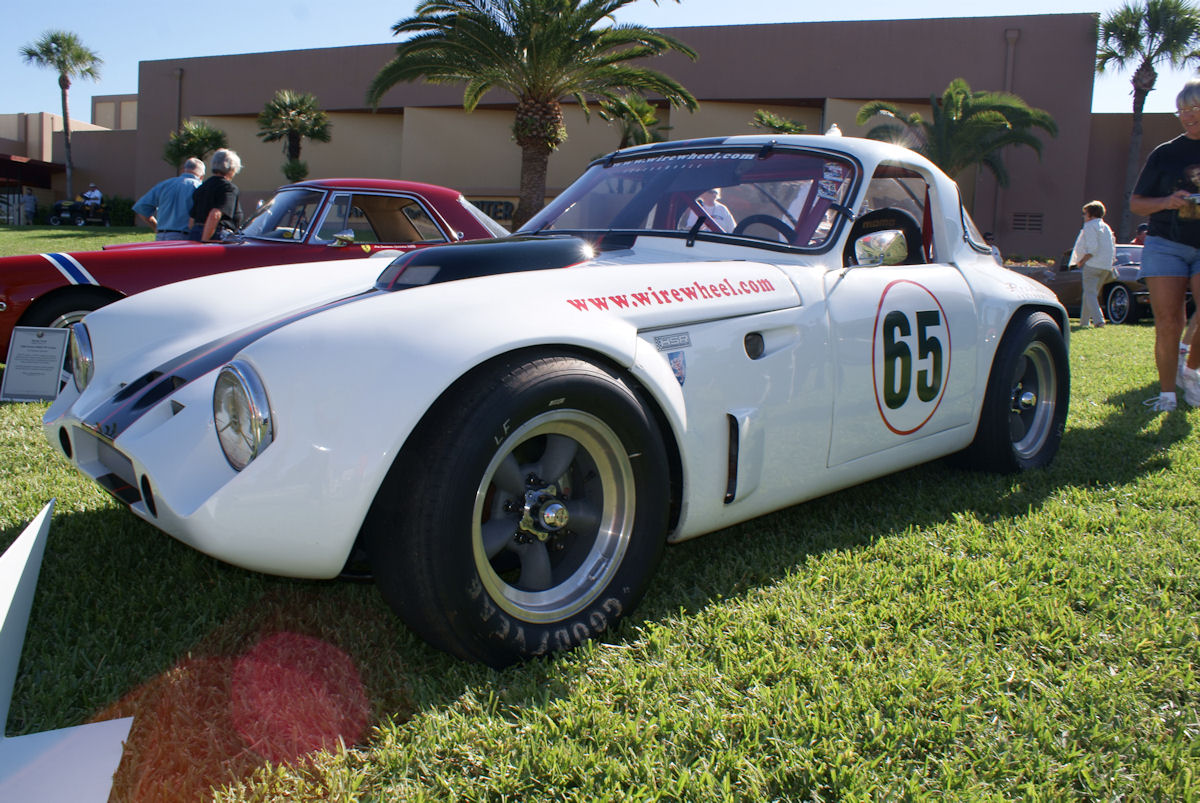
TVR Griffith 200 front

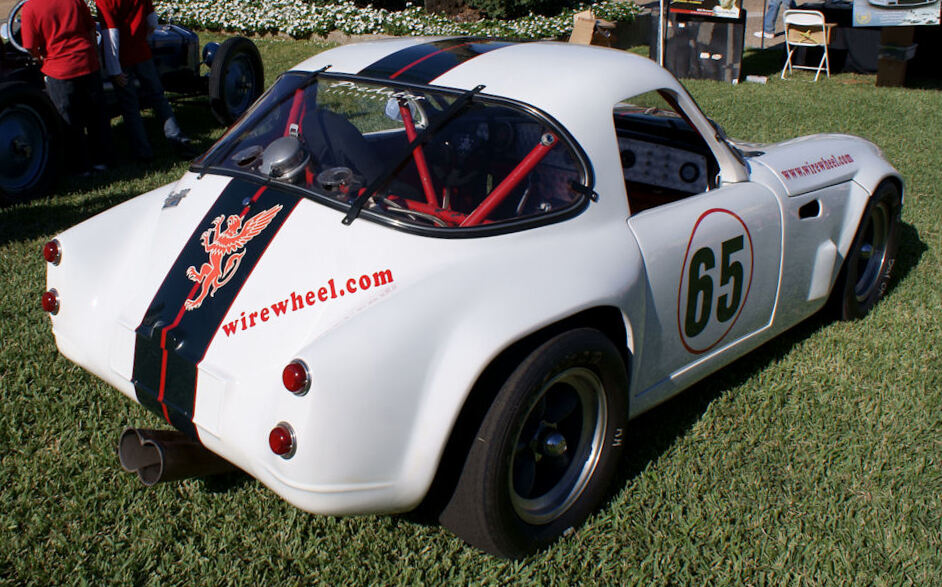
TVR Griffith 200 rear

The Griffith Series 200 could either be fitted with a 195 hp (145 kW; 198 PS) 289 cubic inches (4.74 L) overhead-valve Ford smallblock V8 engine as standard (of the type fitted to Ford Mustangs of the era), or an optional "K-code", "high-power" or "HiPo" V8 of similar displacement that put out 271 hp (202 kW; 275 PS), like those fitted to the contemporary Shelby GT350. It could accelerate from 0-60 mph (97 km/h) in 3.9 seconds, and had a 150 mph (241 km/h) top speed.

The British motoring journalist and former racing driver John Bolster reported that he had tested a Griffith from 0-60mph (97 km/h) in 5.2 seconds and covered the standing quarter-mile in 13.8 seconds. Top speed was 163 mph (262 km/h). Bolster wrote that "over 150 mph (242 km/h), things become somewhat fraught. One must either choose a still day or risk becoming one of Those Magnificent Men in Their Flying Machines." This Griffith had the HiPo engine, fitted with three twin-choke Holley carburetors. Bolster believed the engine developed at least 285 hp (213 kW; 289 PS) at about 6500 rpm.

The immense power, short wheelbase, and light weight of the cars allegedly made them difficult to handle. Despite their performance, just 192 Griffith 200s were made in the US, before the model was superseded by the TVR Griffith 400 (Griffith Series 400).

== Legacy ==
The Griffith Series 200 was followed by the Griffith Series 400 and the Griffith Series 600 before the company ceased operations. In the early 1990s TVR paid homage to the original Griffith by introducing the TVR Griffith. This was the first true use of the name "TVR Griffith".
