= TVR Griffith 400 =

Sports car manufactured by TVR (1964–1967)

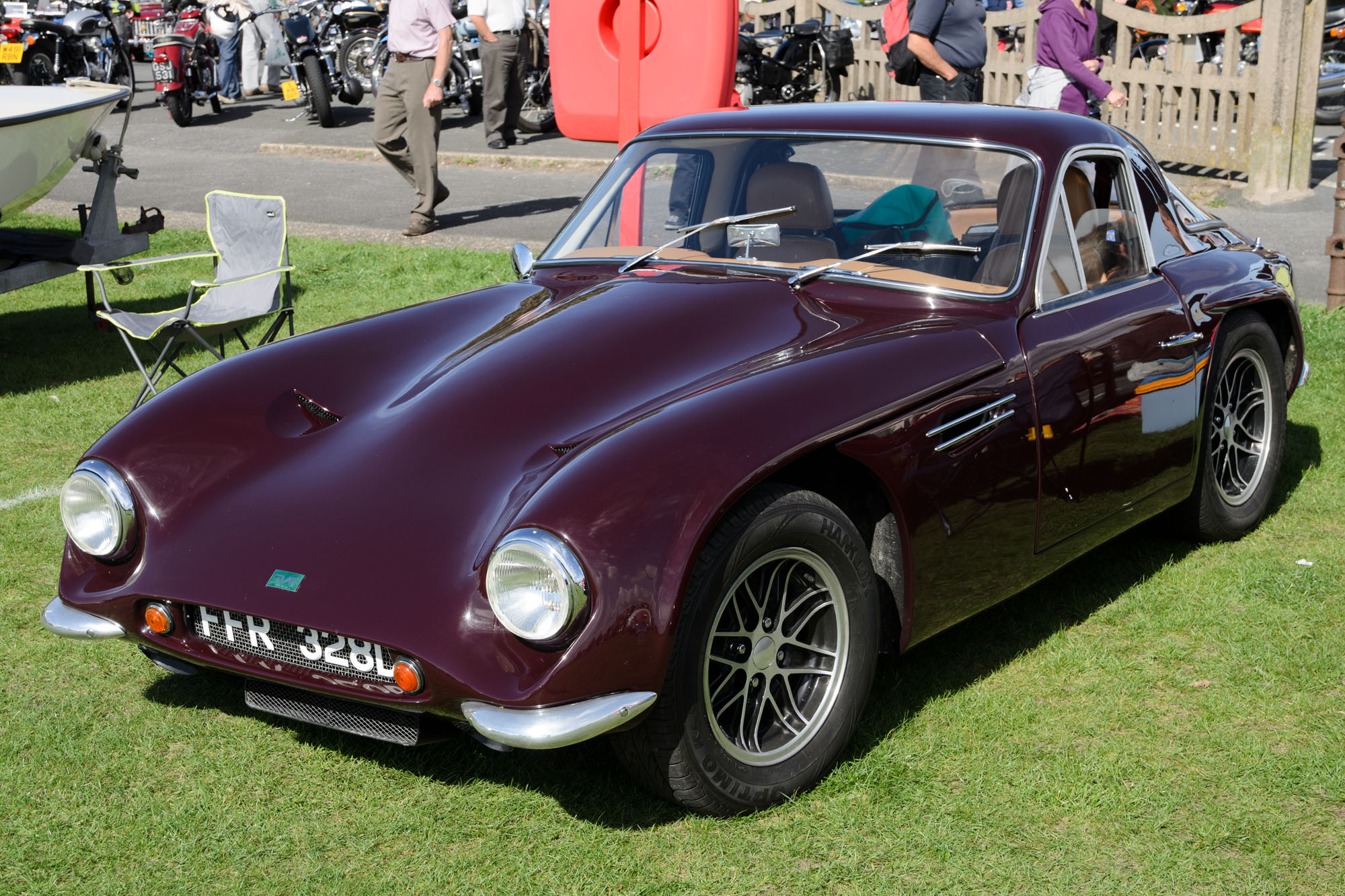
1966 Griffith 400

The TVR Griffith Series 400 is a 2-door coupe sports car produced by Griffith Motor Company in Plainview, New York (a Ford Dealer in Plainview/Hicksville NY, Long Island), between 1964 and 1967. It was the successor to the TVR Griffith 200, featuring improved cooling via a larger radiator with twin electric fans, redesigned rear suspension, and a redesigned rear with better visibility and the round taillights sourced from the Ford Cortina Mark I.

The standard engine in the 400 was the more powerful Ford 289 'HiPo' Windsor engine producing 271 hp that was available in the Series 200 as an option. The 400 weighed a few more pounds than the 200 due mostly to the new Salisbury independent differential with a higher gear ratio, giving it a higher top speed.

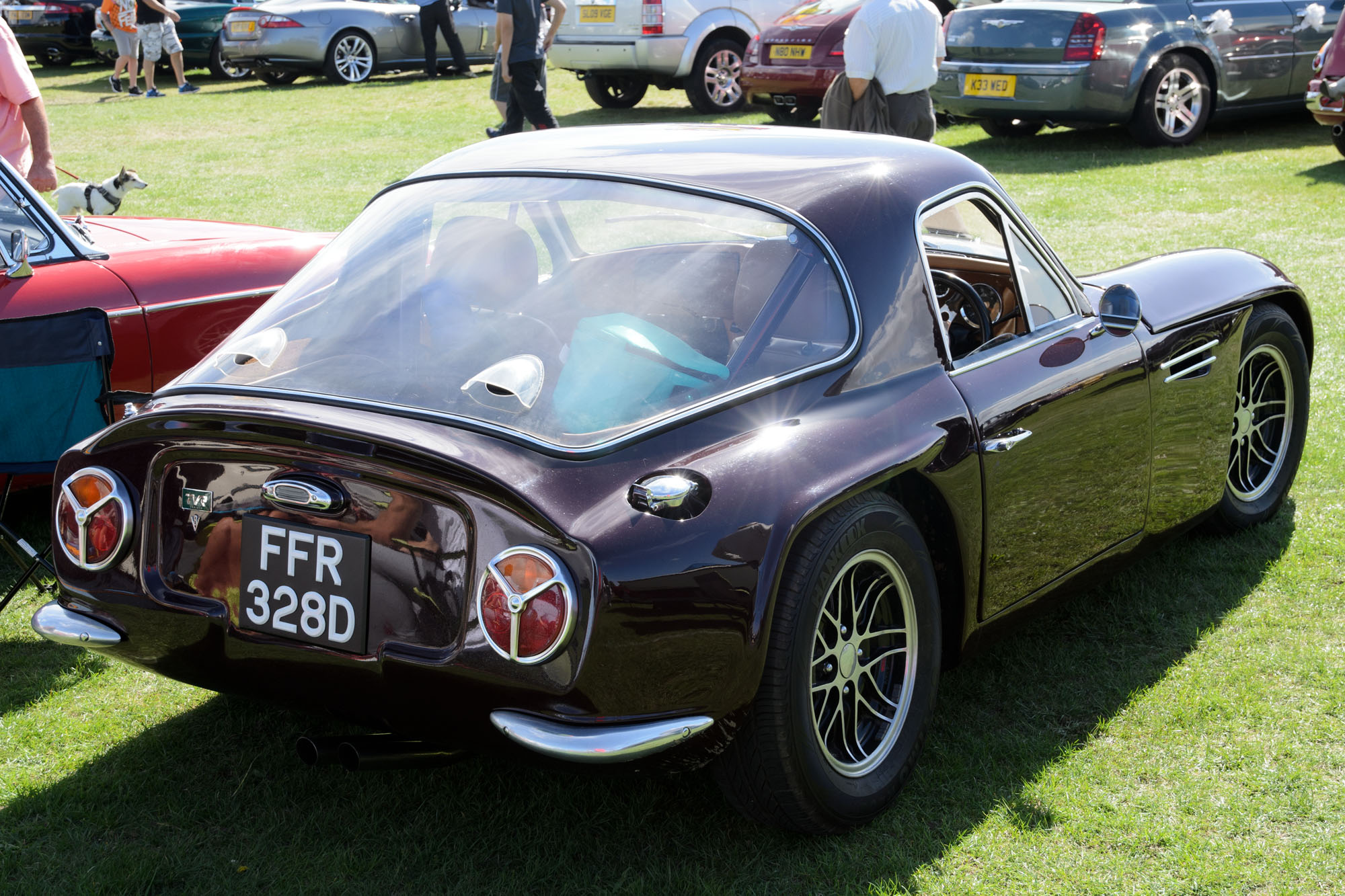
1966 Griffith 400 rear

Grantura Ltd of England designed the independent suspension for the TVR automobiles which later became the Griffith 200 and 400. The Griffith 400 had then state-of-the-art unequal wishbone suspension on all four corners and the car weighed significantly less than its contemporary, the AC Cobra.

As the Series 400 cars were being produced in early 1965, the entire east coast of the US was crippled by a prolonged dock strike. This not only caused a disruption in the supply of the series 400 bodies that were being shipped from TVR in Blackpool, UK, it also caused a delay in the shipment of the newer Series 600. Frank Reisner, whose Intermeccanica body works in Turin, Italy, was building the new steel bodied Griffith, was also unable to have the rolling chassises shipped. Jack Griffith attempted to bring his car to the public by having these bodies airlifted across the Atlantic, before the venture collapsed. The remaining Intermeccanica cars were imported to the US by Steve Wilder, where they were assembled by Holman-Moody and sold as the Omega.

With only 59 copies of the 400 and 10 600s off the assembly line at the Griffith factory in Plainview, Long Island, N.Y, USA, the company was dissolved.

== Specifications ==
- Engine capacity: 4,722 cc/289 cid V8
- Power: 271 bhp (202 kW; 275 PS)
- Top speed: Approximately 155 mph (249 km/h)
- Transmission: 4-speed manual gearbox, rear-wheel drive
