= Royale Sports 2000 =

Sports prototype race car

Royale S2000M Royale RP37 Royale RP38 Royale RP42
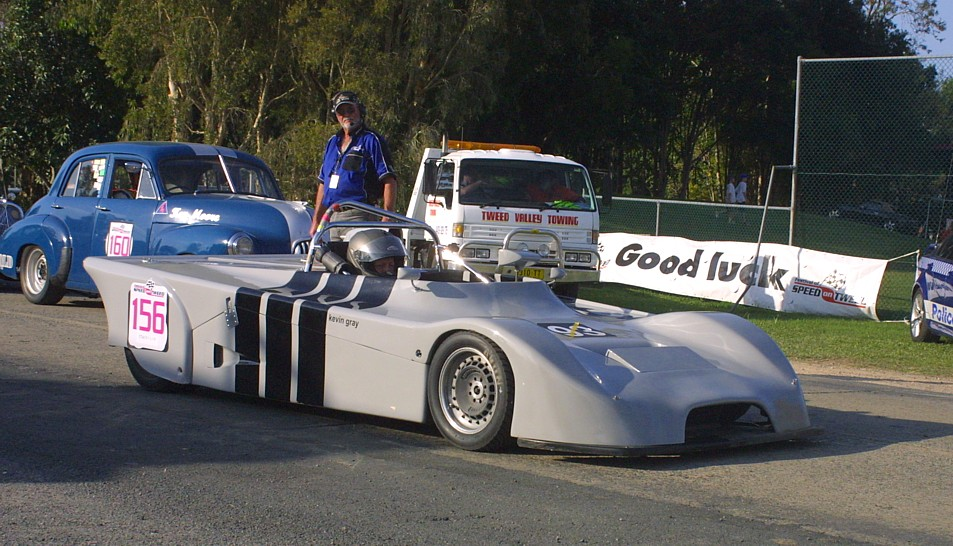
- Category: Sports 2000

Technical specifications
- Chassis: fibreglass body on aluminium monocoque
- Suspension: double wishbones, push-rod actuated coil springs over shock absorbers, anti-roll bar (front)
- Engine: Ford Pinto 2.0 L (122.0 cu in) DOHC I4 naturally-aspirated mid-engined
- Transmission: Hewland Mk.8/9 4-speed manual
- Power: 126–200 hp (94–149 kW)
- Weight: 500 kg (1,102 lb)

Competition history
- Debut: 1983 Brands Hatch Thundersports

The Royale Sports 2000 series, namely the Royale S2000M, the Royale RP37, the Royale RP38, and the Royale RP42, are a series of Sports 2000 prototype race cars, designed, developed and built by British manufacturer Royale, for 2-liter sports car racing, between 1981 and 1985.
