= Carbir Race Cars =

American race car constructor

- Type: Corporation
- Industry: Automotive
- Founded: 1995
- Founder: Brian Utt; Carl Seaberg
- Headquarters: Grafton, Wisconsin
- Website: http://www.carbir.com/

Carbir Race Cars is an American race car constructor.

== History ==
=== Sports 2000 ===
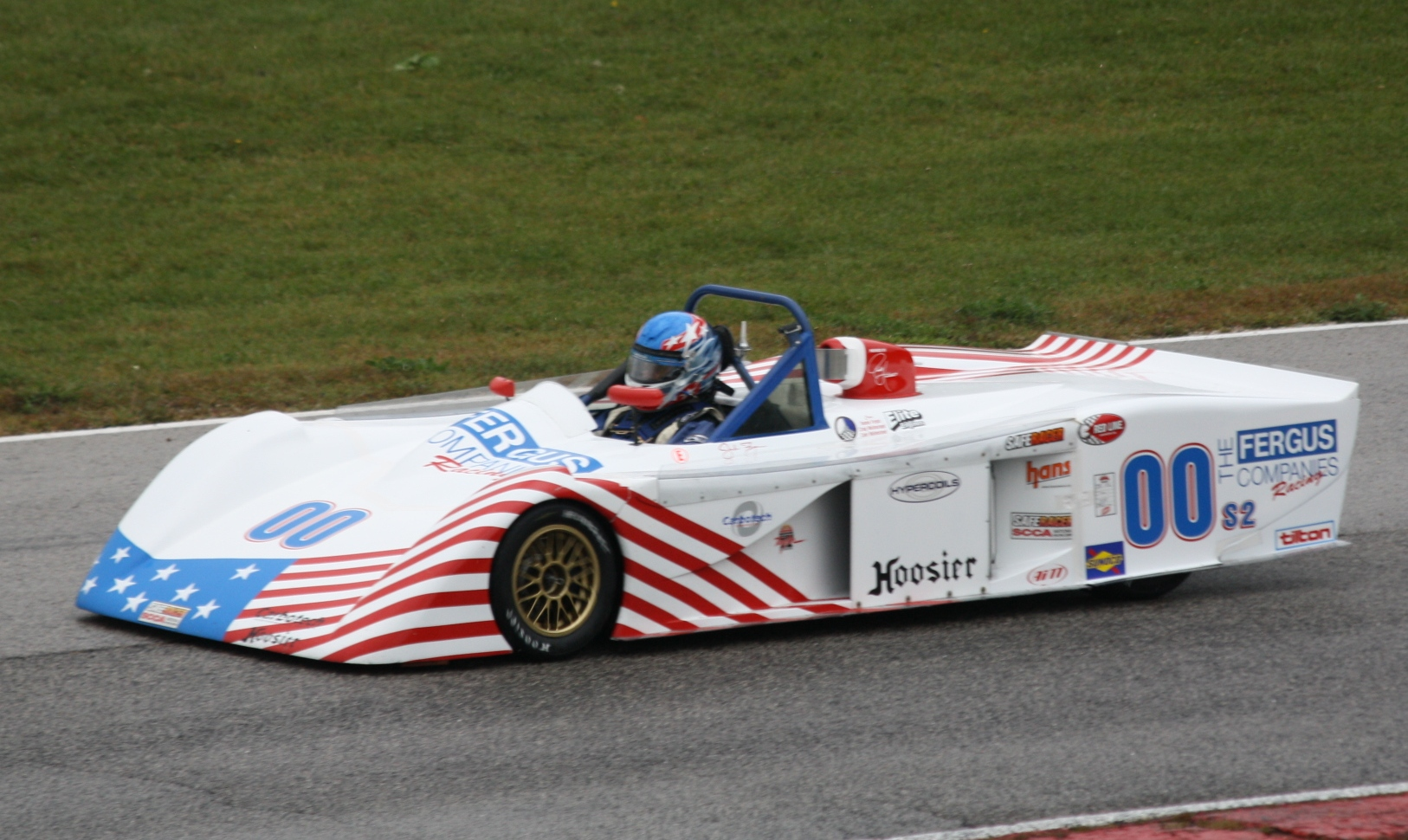
Sports 2000 winner John Fergus racing at the 2011 SCCA National Runoff in a Carbir CS2.

Carbir Race Cars was founded in 1995. The first car to be designed and produced was the Carbir CS2. The Carbir CS2 went on to dominate the American Cities Racing League and the SCCA Sports 2000 class. In 1998 the first Carbir was entered in the SCCA National Championship Runoffs. John Fergus, II finished second in the S2000 class behind David Downey in a Lola T89/90. Fergus, II would win the Runoffs in the S2000 class in 1999, 2001, 2002, 2004, 2007, 2008 and 2011.

=== USF2000 ===
While designing the CS2 the Carbir crew also designed the Carbir DS3 U.S. F2000 National Championship car. The Carbir DS3 was based on the Piper F2000, Brian Utt bought the designs and built his own F2000. The car made its debut in 1999 with factory driver Jeff Glenn and Galen Puccini. During their debut race at Phoenix International Raceway Jeff Glenn was the best finisher out of the two, finishing thirteenth. When Andy Lally joined the team results drastically improved. Coming from a tenth place the American driver won the race. More podium finishes came at Mid-Ohio, Pikes Peak and Sebring. Lally finished eleventh in the standings. Lally returned in USF2000 for the 2000 season alongside Michael Curtiss. After a disappointing opening round in which Lally finished ninth and Curtiss finished twentieth the team pulled out of the championship. Privateers continued to run Carbir chassis in the championship. Rookie Tom Dyer scored a fifth-place finish overall while running in the American Continental Championship class for older cars. Scott Rubenzer scored the best result for a Carbir chassis in 2001. At Homestead-Miami Speedway the driver finished sixteenth.

In 2000 Estonian driver Tõnis Kasemets competed a Carbir DS3 in the SCCA Central Division National Formula Continental class. He won two races and finish fourth in the championship. At the SCCA National Championship Runoffs of the same year Tom Dyer scored a second place.

=== Daytona Prototype ===
In 2002 Carbir designed a prototype to compete in the Grand-Am Daytona Prototype class. On May sixth 2002 the design was approved by the Grand-Am organisation to be built. Carbir was the third manufacturer to get permission after FABCAR Engineering and Doran Enterprises. The car was designed to fit all engine types but especially the Chevrolet Corvette engine. The car was never built.

=== Formula Ford ===
The first Formula Ford car designed and built by Carbir was the CR6. The car appeared in various championships but without major results. In 2013 Carbir made a car to compete in the F1600 Championship Series with a Honda powered factory entry. Carbir appeared on the initial entry lists but the deal never came into fruition since the car was never finished. The driver appeared at the 2013 in a Ford Kent engined Van Diemen RF92. The driver finished second behind Tim Kautz driving a Piper DF3D.

Year	Car	Class
1995	Carbir CS2	Sports 2000
1998	Carbir DS3	U.S. F2000 National Championship (former), SCCA Formula Continental
2002	Carbir SRZ	Daytona Prototype never built
2010	Carbir CR6	Formula Ford 1600
2013	Carbir CR8	F1600 Championship Series never built
