= Lola T590 =

Lola prototype sportscar

- Category: C Sports/Sports 2000
- Constructor: Lola
- Predecessor: Lola T490

Technical specifications
- Chassis: Fiberglass bodywork, aluminum monocoque or tubular rear subframe
- Suspension (front): Double wishbones, coil springs over shock absorbers, anti-roll bar
- Suspension (rear): Reversed lower wishbones, top links, twin radius rods, anti-roll bar
- Length: 143 in (3,632.2 mm)
- Width: 67 in (1,701.8 mm)
- Height: 35 in (889.0 mm)
- Axle track: 55.5 in (1,409.7 mm)
- Wheelbase: 95 in (2,413.0 mm)
- Engine: Ford-Cosworth, Ford-Cosworth BDG, or Hart 420R 2.0 L (122.0 cu in) OHC/DOHC I4 naturally-aspirated mid-engined (Sports 2000); Volkswagen or Mazda 13B 1.3–2.1 L (79–128 cu in) I4/2-rotor wankel naturally-aspirated mid-engined (C Sports)
- Transmission: Hewland Mk.9 4/5-speed manual
- Power: 210 hp (160 kW)
- Weight: 1,080–1,286 lb (490–583 kg)

Competition history
- Debut: 1980

The Lola T590, and its evolutions, the Lola T592, the Lola T592S, the Lola T594, the Lola T594C, the Lola T596, the Lola T596C, the Lola T598, and the Lola T598C, are a series of Sports 2000 and C Sports prototype race cars, designed, developed and built by British manufacturer Lola, for sports car racing, in 1980.
