= Lola T390 =

- Category: Sports 2000
- Constructor: Lola
- Predecessor: Lola T380
- Successor: Lola T490

Technical specifications
- Chassis: Fiberglass bodywork, aluminum monocoque
- Suspension (front): Double wishbones, coil springs over shock absorbers, anti-roll bar
- Suspension (rear): Reversed lower wishbones, top links, single trailing arms, anti-roll bar
- Engine: Ford-Cosworth FVD/Hart 420/BMW M12/7 2.0 L (122.0 cu in) V8 naturally-aspirated Mid-engined
- Transmission: Hewland 5-speed manual
- Power: 280 hp (210 kW) @ 9000 rpm
- Weight: 578 kg (1,274 lb)

Competition history
- Debut: 1975

The Lola T390 is a 2-litre Sports 2000 prototype race car, designed, developed and built by British manufacturer Lola, for 2-litre sports car racing, in 1975.
