= March 82S =

Sports prototype race car

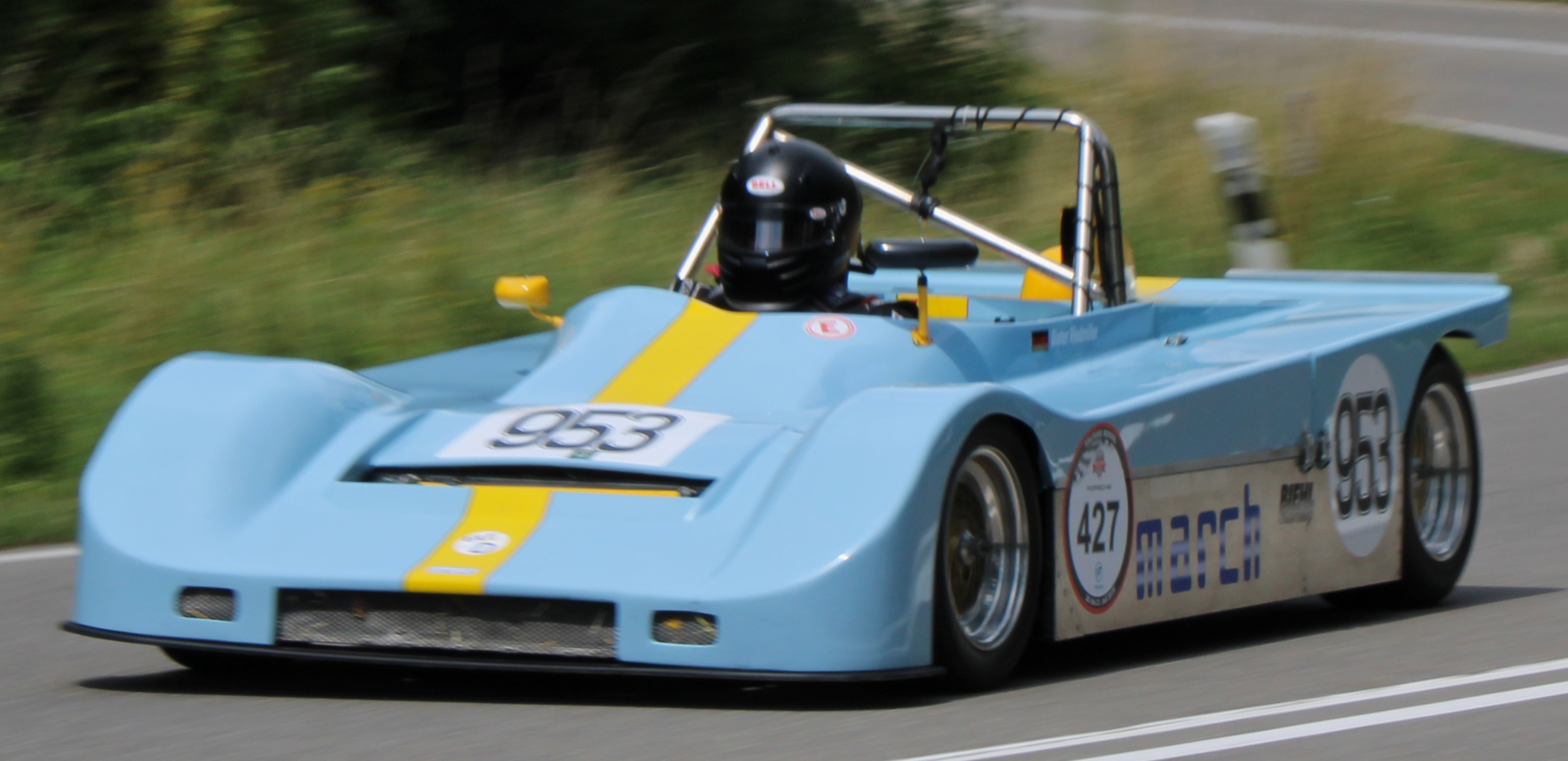
- Category: Sports 2000

Technical specifications
- Chassis: fibreglass body on aluminium monocoque
- Suspension: double wishbones, push-rod actuated coil springs over shock absorbers, anti-roll bar (front) twin lower links, single upper links, trailing arms, coil springs over dampers, anti-roll bar (rear)
- Engine: Ford Pinto 2.0 L (122.0 cu in) DOHC I4 naturally-aspirated mid-engined
- Transmission: Hewland Mk.8/9 4-speed manual
- Power: 126–200 hp (94–149 kW)
- Weight: 500 kg (1,102 lb)

Competition history
- Debut: 1982 SM Zeltweg
- Last event: 1990 SM Hockenheim
Entries	Races	Wins	Podiums	Poles
22	22	0	0	0

The March 82S is a Sports 2000 prototype race car, designed, developed and built by British manufacturer March Engineering, for sports car racing, in 1982.
