= Lola T490 =

- Category: Group 5 (Sports 2000)
- Constructor: Lola
- Predecessor: Lola T390
- Successor: Lola T590

Technical specifications
- Chassis: Fiberglass bodywork, aluminum monocoque or tubular rear subframe
- Suspension (front): Double wishbones, coil springs over shock absorbers, anti-roll bar
- Suspension (rear): Reversed lower wishbones, top links, twin radius rods, anti-roll bar
- Engine: Ford-Cosworth 2.0 L (122.0 cu in) I4 naturally-aspirated Mid-engined
- Transmission: Hewland Mk.9 4-speed manual
- Power: 126–128 hp (94–95 kW)
- Weight: 1,310 lb (590 kg)

Competition history
- Debut: 1977

The Lola T490 is a 2-litre Group 5 Sports 2000 prototype race car, designed, developed and built by British manufacturer Lola, for 2-litre sports car racing, in 1977.
