= Sports 2000 =

Race car class

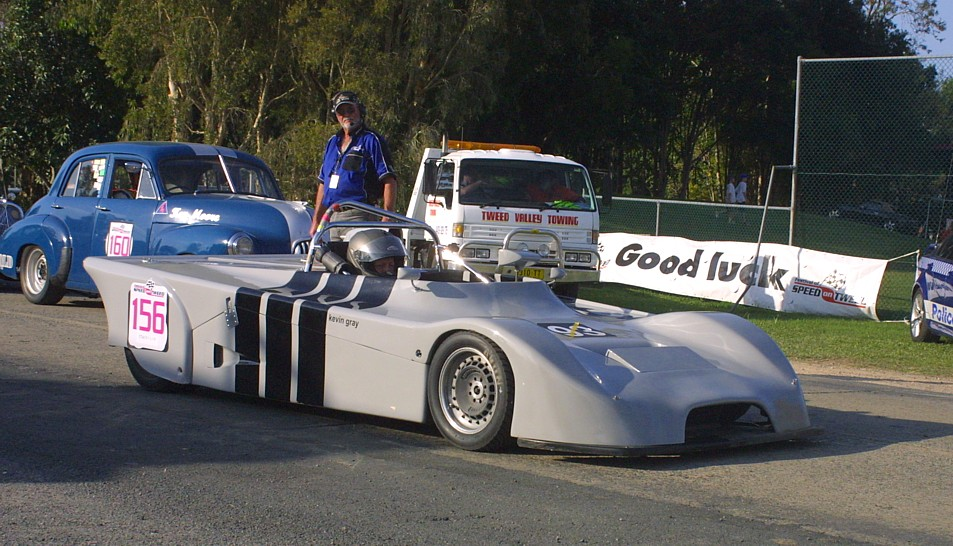
Royale RP37

Sports 2000 is a restricted-rules class of two-seat, mid-engined, open-cockpit, full-bodied sports-prototype racecar used largely in amateur road racing. Sometimes known as S2000 or S2, the class was developed by John Webb, then of the Brands Hatch racing circuit in England, as an affordable form of sports car racing, essentially a sports car version of Formula Ford 2000. The key attributes of the class were a body design reminiscent of two-liter Group 6 sports racing cars like the Chevron B21 and Lola T-212 but with an ultra-reliable and inexpensive drivetrain comprising a two-liter "Pinto" overhead camshaft engine with very limited allowed modifications and the well-proven, VW-based Hewland Mk 9 transaxle. S2000 aerodynamics continued to evolve beyond their 1970s Group 6 roots, with very 'slippery' cars featuring spats over the wheels becoming the norm.

In the UK S2000 was largely seen as an alternative to front-engined Clubmans racing, a class for amateurs who were often deeply involved in developing their own cars over periods of years. The category suffered due to the demise of FF2000 in the late 1980s, and further when Clubmans transformed into the rear-engined National Supersports category, but it has recently undergone something of a revival in both historic and contemporary forms as a (relatively) low-cost form of sports car racing.

In the US, while it continues to have popularity as an amateur race class within SCCA competition in the US, at one point in the late 1980s and early 1990s, professional Sports 2000 racing was prevalent. One such series was the American Cities Racing League (ACRL) where the teams represented cities (primarily on the US West Coast) much as in stick-and-ball sports. Rather than individual drivers running for the championship, the two team drivers earned points for their sponsor city, a concept revived for the A1GP, where teams represent countries rather than cities. This series used the uprated Cosworth/Ford YAC engine. Another series was the North American Pro Series or NAPS which visited many of the classic roadrace circuits in the U.S. and was often a support race for IMSA weekends. Later this series became the Oldsmobile Pro Series running the Oldsmobile Quad 4 engine.

Three classes of Sports 2000 racing are currently common in the eastern US and Canada, S2, VS2 (vintage), and HS2 (historic). Racing with the Vintage Sports 2000 North America club frequently has fields of more than 20 cars of varying vintages.

In Sports 2000 racing in the UK, the Pinto engine has recently been replaced with the Mazda-based Ford Duratec engine, although Pintos continue to compete as a separate class. The primary group for UK Sports 2000 racing is Sports Racing Car Club(SRCC).

In South Africa, an innovative transverse engined version of the Sports 2000 participated in a highly successful national series throughout the 1990s. Notable drivers (and series organizers) are Neville Jordan and Alan Eve who now own the A1GP cars and have set up Afrix Motorsport.

Early Sports 2000 cars are now accepted by several vintage racing sanctioning bodies in the US.

Companies that manufactured Sports 2000 chassis include: Apache, Carbir, Chevron, Crossle, Doran, Gunn, Lola, March, MCR, Ocelot, Pratt & Miller, Reynard, Royale, Shannon, Shrike, Swift, Tiga Race Cars, and Van Diemen.

== List of Sports 2000 Cars ==
Manufacturer	Chassis	Debut	Image
Carbir	CS2	1995	
Chevron	B63	1985	
Doran	JE1		
Lola	Horag HSB	1991	
Lola	T390	1975	
Lola	T490	1977	
Lola	T590	1980	
Lola	T598	1985	
Lola	T86/90	1986	
Lola	T87/90	1987	
Lola	T88/90	1988	
Lola	T89/90	1989	
Lola	T90/90	1990	
Lola	T91/90	1991	
Lola	B07/90	2007	
March	81S	1981	
March	82S	1982	
March	83S	1983	
March	84S	1984	
Reynard	88S	1988	
Reynard	90S	1990	
Royale	RP37	1984	
Royale	RP38	1985	
Royale	RP42	1985	
Royale	S2000M	1981	
Swift	DB2	1984	
Swift	DB5	1990	
Tiga	SC78	1978	
Tiga	SC79	1979	
Tiga	SC80	1980	
Tiga	SC81	1981	
Tiga	SC82	1982	
Tiga	SC83	1983	
Tiga	SC84	1984	
Tiga	SC85	1985	
Tiga	SC86	1986	
Tiga	SC87	1987	
Tiga	SC88	1988	
Tiga	SC89	1989	
