= Lola Cars =

British automobile manufacturer

Lola Cars Limited
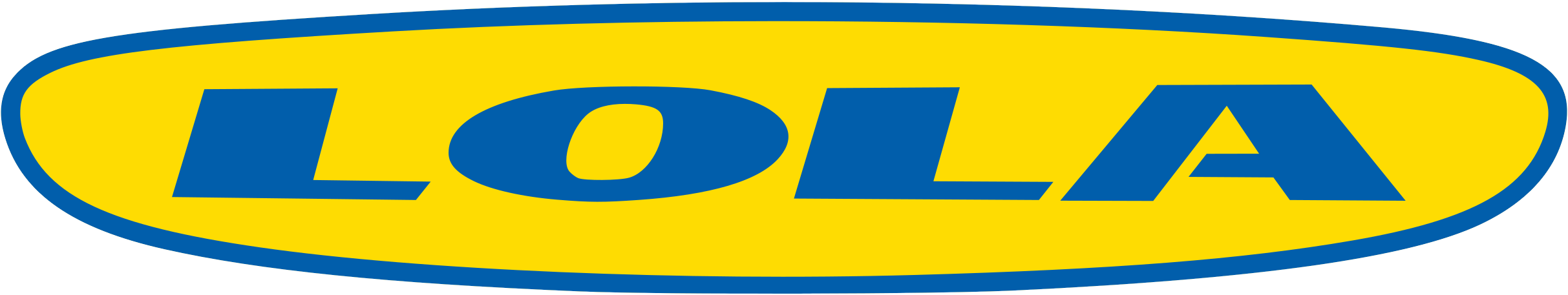
- Type: Private
- Industry: Automotive
- Founded: 1958 (original); 2024 (revival)
- Founder: Eric Broadley
- Defunct: 2012 (original)
- Headquarters: Huntingdon, England, UK
- Key people: Till Bechtolsheimer (Chairman)
- Products: Automobiles
- Owner: Till Bechtolsheimer
- Divisions: Lola Composites; Lola Special Projects; Lola Aylings
- Website: lola-cars.co.uk

Lola Cars Limited is a British automobile manufacturer founded in 1958 by Eric Broadley in Bromley, England. The company is now owned by Till Bechtolsheimer, who purchased it in 2022. Lola Cars endured for more than fifty years to become one of the oldest and largest manufacturers of racing cars in the world. Lola started by building small front-engine sports cars, and branched out into Formula Junior cars before diversifying into a wider range of sporting vehicles. In 2012, Lola Cars stopped operations. Lola returned to motorsport in 2024 by joining the Formula E World Championship as an entrant and a powertrain supplier in a technical partnership with Yamaha.

== History ==
Lola Cars was a brand of the Lola Group, which combined former rowing boat manufacturer Lola Aylings and Lola Composites, that specialized in carbon fibre production.

Lola was acquired by Martin Birrane in 1997 after the unsuccessful MasterCard Lola attempt at Formula One. After a period in bankruptcy administration, Lola Cars International ceased trading on 5 October 2012. The administrator, CCW Recovery Solutions, was unable to find a suitable buyer and the firm ceased trading on 5 October 2012, laying off the last employees.

On 16 October 2012, it was announced in the competition press that some assets of Lola Cars were acquired by Multimatic Inc. and The Carl A. Haas Automotive company. In addition to the asset purchase, Multimatic and Haas obtained a licence agreement to use the Lola Cars name and intellectual property.

In late 2021, Till Bechtolsheimer bid and subsequently bought Lola in June 2022. The assets bought include the brand and trademarks, intellectual property, and the Lola Technical Centre (with wind tunnel). Bechtolsheimer subsequently made it clear he has the intention of reviving the company within two years. He expressed an ambition to have a car on the track in the 2024–25 time frame. Bechtolsheimer drove a Lola for the first time in November 2022—a 1958 Mk1 at Harris Hill Raceway. In October 2024, Lola acquired Paceteq, an automotive industry data technology and software company in its bid to accelerate its development after entering Formula E.

== Sports cars ==
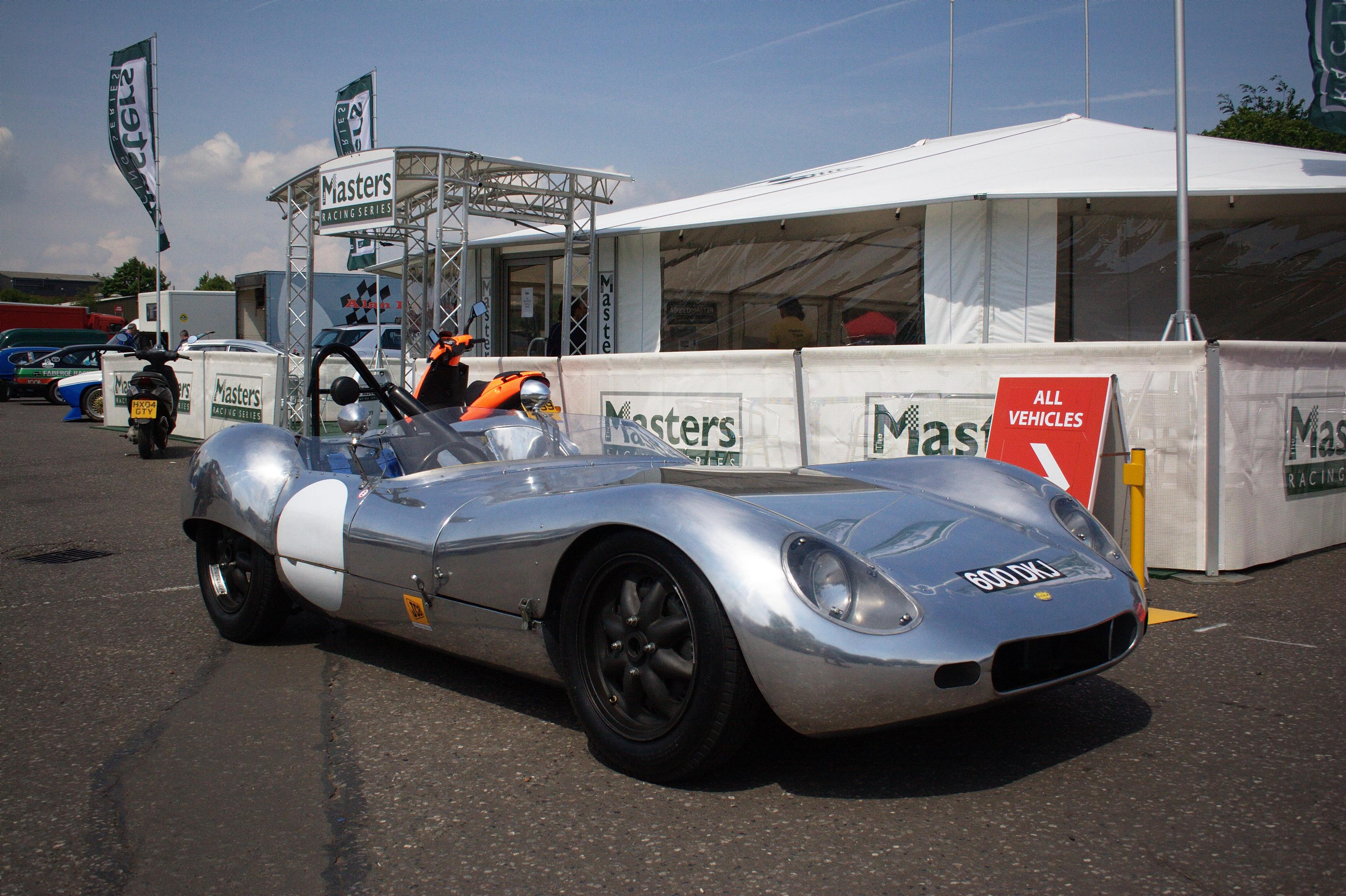
Lola's first prototype, built in 1958

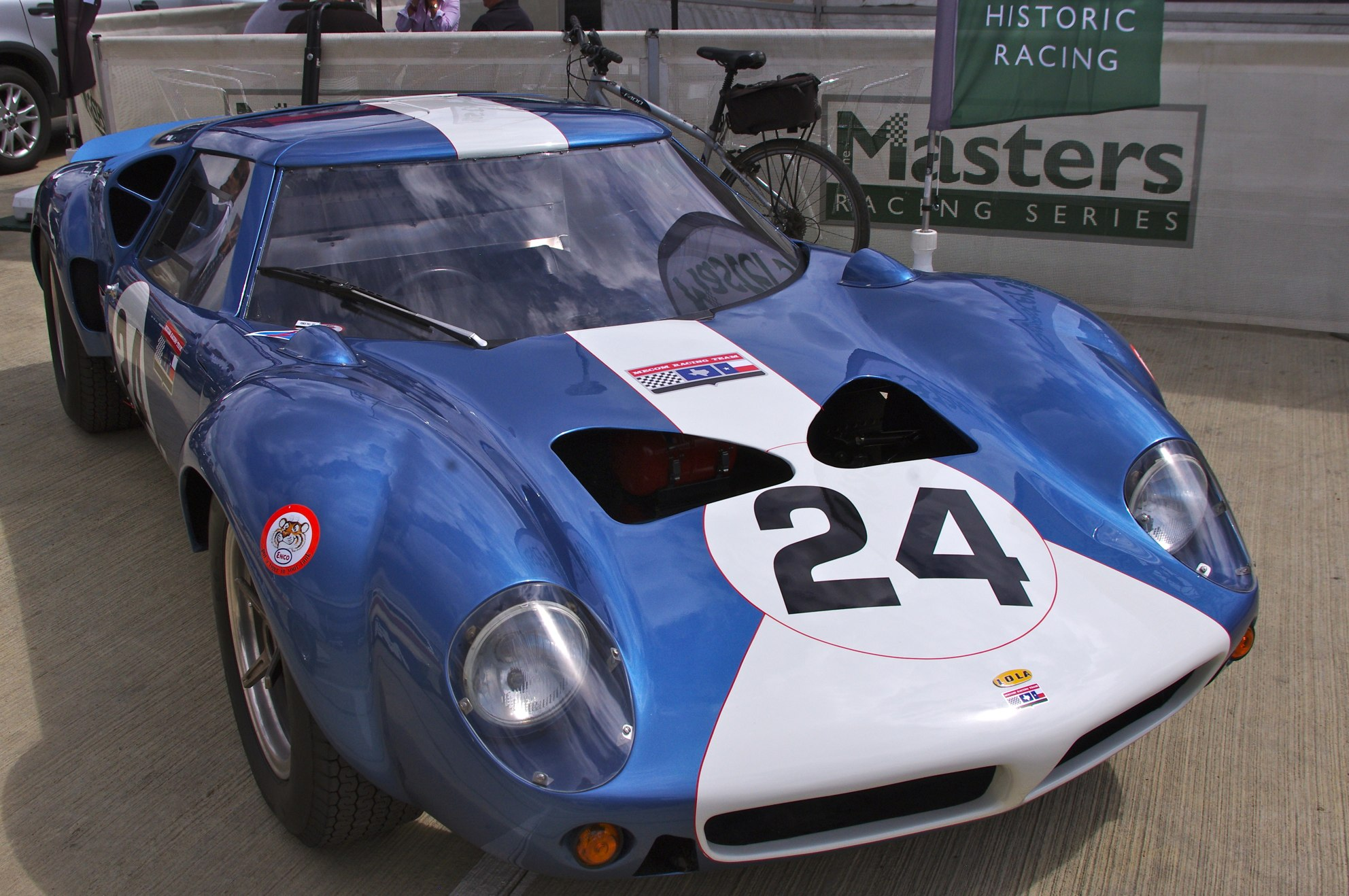
Lola Mk.6

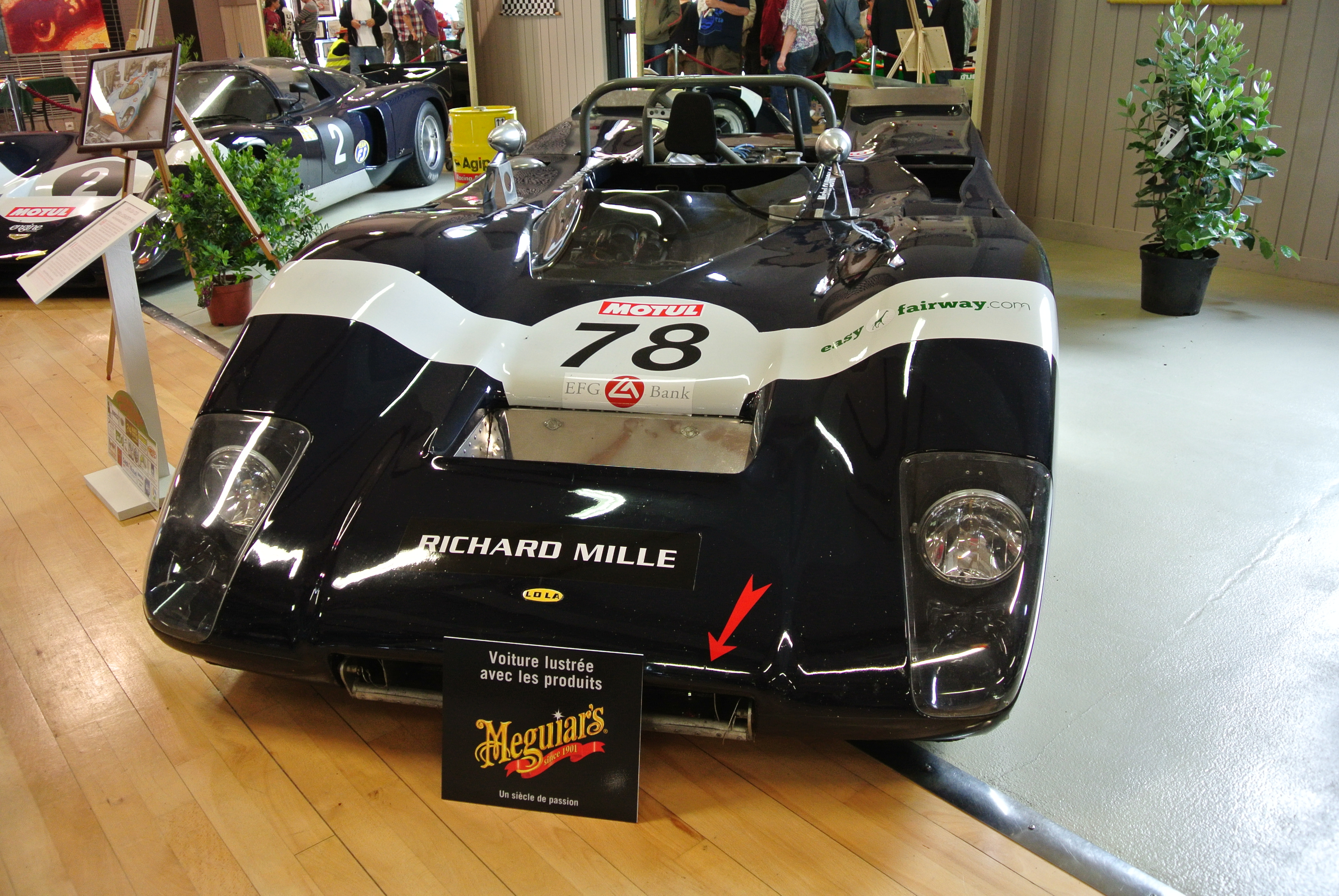
1970 Lola T210, in which Jo Bonnier won the European 2-Litre Sports Car Championship drivers title in 1970

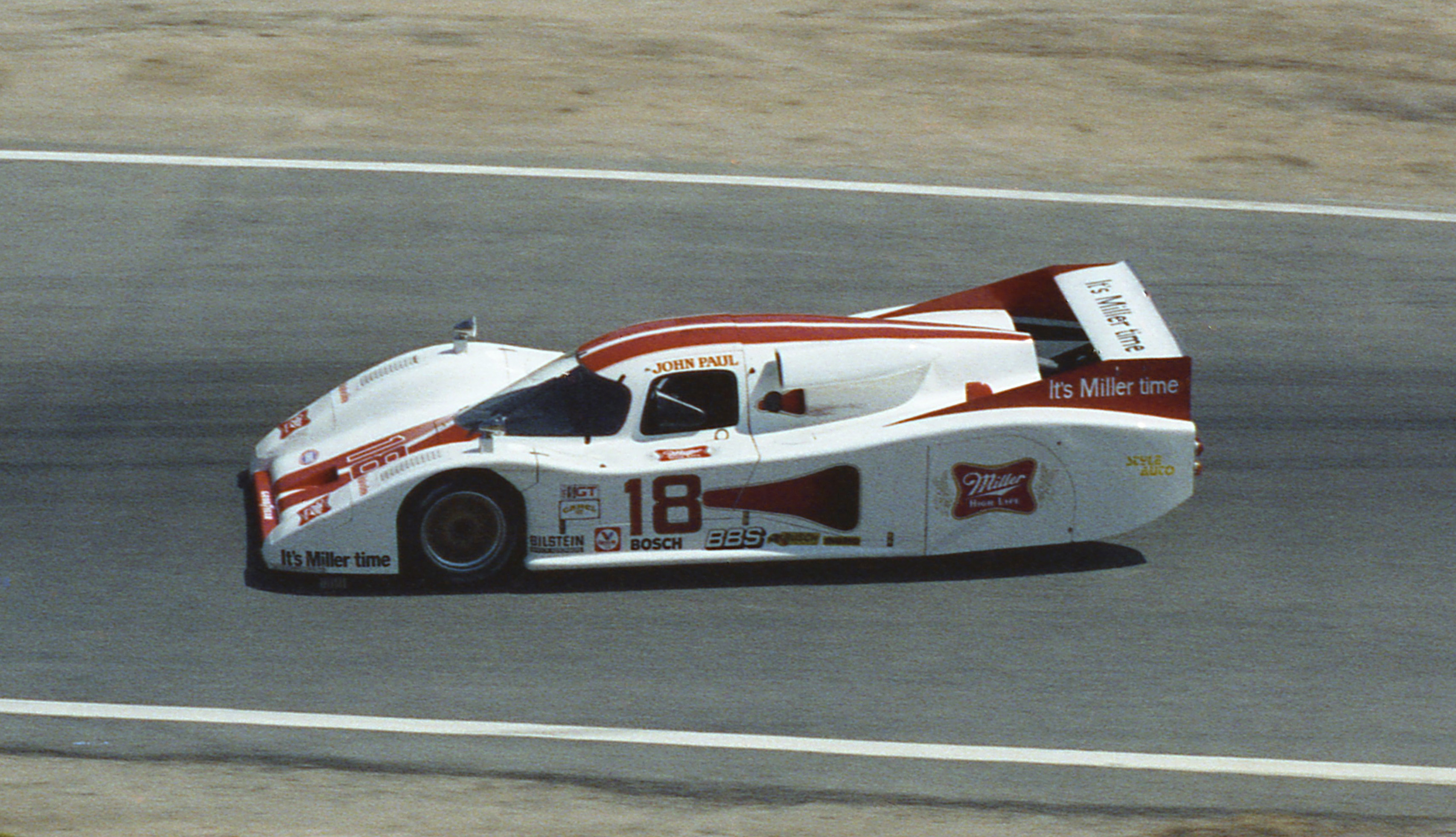
A Lola T600 IMSA Grand Touring Prototype from 1982

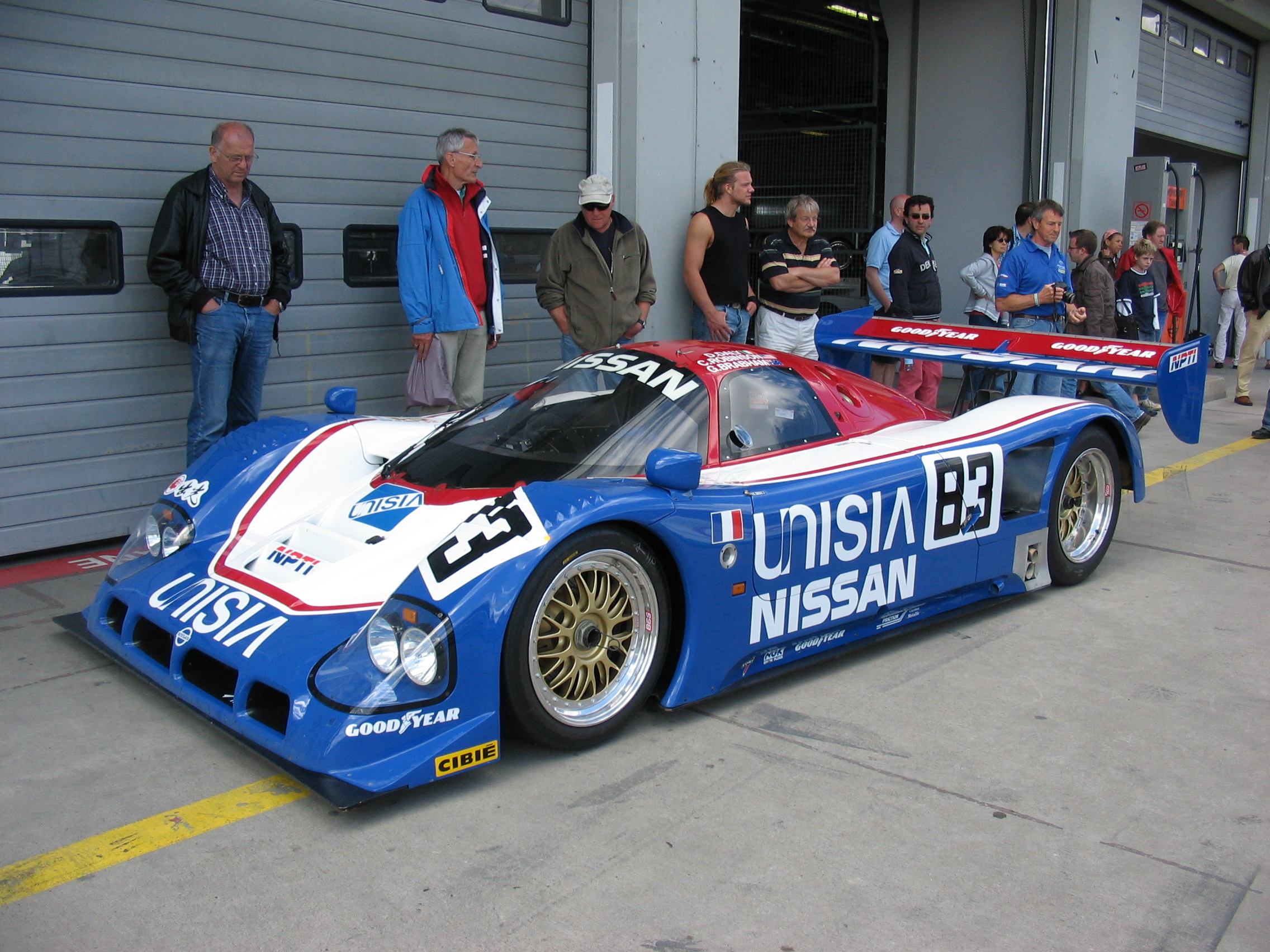
A Lola-built Nissan R90CK Group C sports car at the DAMC 05 Oldtimer Festival Nürburgring

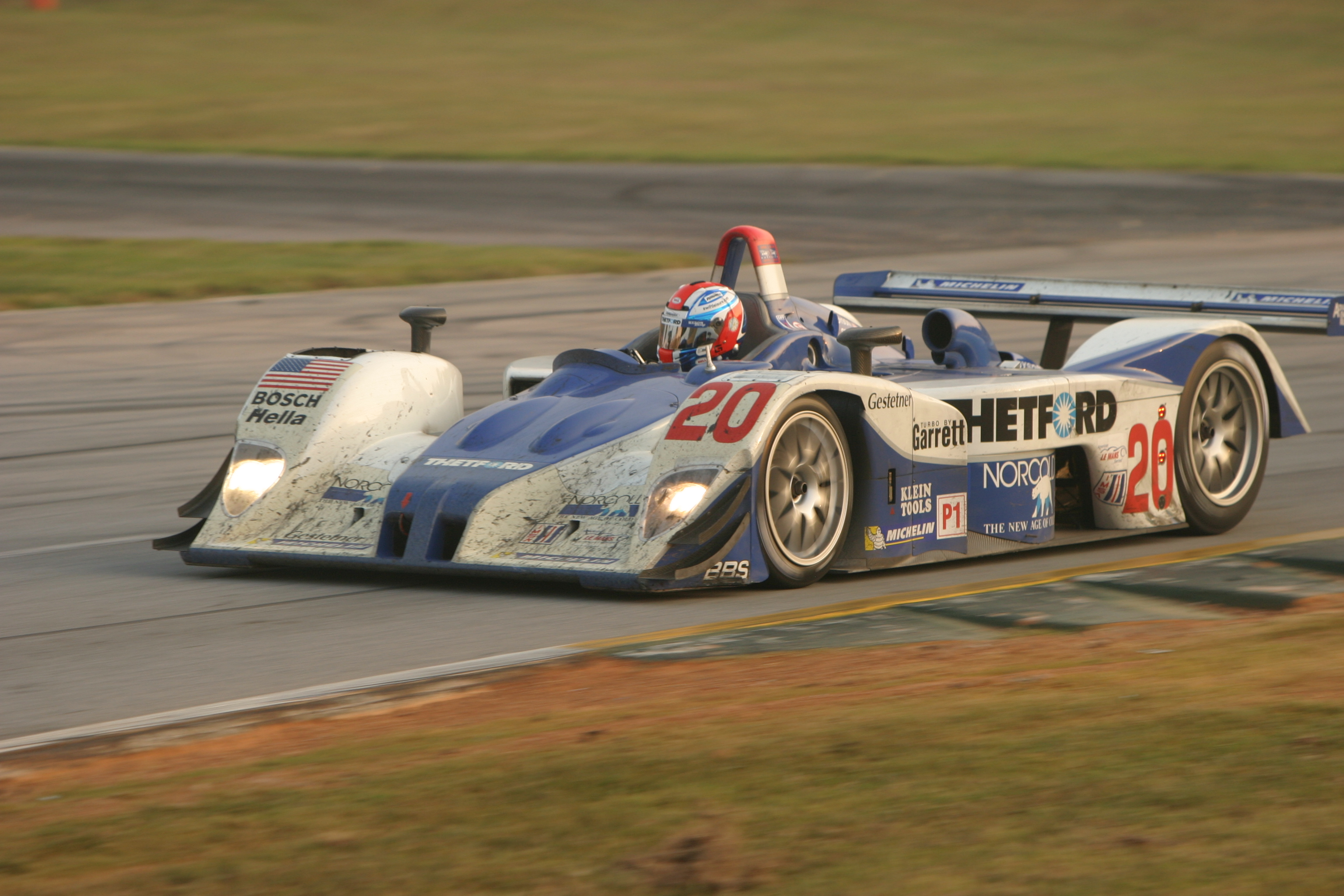
An MG-Lola EX257 Le Mans prototype

=== Early days – the 1960s ===
Lola was one of the top chassis suppliers in the 1960s. After its small front-engined sports cars came various single-seaters including Formula Junior, Formula 3, Formula 2 and Formula 1 cars.

Broadley designed the Ford V8 powered Lola Mk.6 coupe. Ford took a keen interest in this and paid Broadley to put the company on hold for two years and merge his ideas with Roy Lunn's work, giving rise to the Ford GT40. Initial work was done at the Lola works at Bromley before moving to a factory on the Slough Trading Estate. Broadley managed to release himself from this contract after a year and started developing his own cars again, retaining the Slough factory, which was in Lola's name (leaving John Wyer to find new premises for Ford Advanced Vehicles, which were also on the Slough Estate). Broadley started off in sports cars with the Lola T70 and its successors (T16x, T22x) which were used successfully all over the world from the World Championship for Makes to the CanAm series, until 1973. In 2005, Lola announced that a new batch of T70 coupés, to the original specifications, would be released. These were to be homologated for historic racing and there was talk of a one-make series for the cars. The Slough built cars incorporated the letters 'SL' in their chassis numbers, just as the cars built at Bromley had incorporated 'BR'.

=== 1970s ===
Various Group 5 and Group 6 sports cars including the T210 and T212, and T28x/29x/38x/39x series were also built, competing with Chevron, March and others. Alain de Cadenet's Le Mans 'specials' tended to be based on Lola technology.

Lola (with rebodied Formula 5000 cars) dominated the CanAm sports car series when it was revived in the late 1970s, but many motorsport fans do not consider the single-seater Formula 5000-based cars from this era to be true sports cars, despite their full bodywork and enclosed wheel-wells.

=== 1980s and early 1990s ===
Lola introduced the T600/T610 range for IMSA GTP racing in the early 1980s – these were fitted with a range of engines including Cosworth, Mazda and Chevrolet, as well as the novel Polimotor engine built using composite materials. Derivatives of this car were successful for some time in IMSA and Group C racing. Later Lola Group C and GTP cars tended to be built specifically for manufacturer programmes, specifically the later Nissan Group C entries and the Chevrolet Corvette GTP program. Lola also built a car for the 3.5 L Group C formula, the T92/10, but the championship collapsed before this could be fully developed.

=== Late 1990s and 2000s ===
More recently, Lola produced a range of sports cars for Le Mans-style racing starting with the B98/10, which was successful in the European market but less so in the USA. The B2K/10, with its additional central headlight reminiscent of a cyclops or a locomotive was more notable for its looks than its performance. While Lola has had limited success in the top class of the sport versus factory cars like the BMW V12 LMR and Audi R8, Lola has enjoyed periods of dominance in the second class (formerly LMP675, now LMP2), including championship class victories in the American Le Mans Series, although this has been threatened in the ALMS LMP2 by works-supported entries from Acura and Porsche.

A dedicated LMP675 car was built for MG in 2001, powered by a two-litre four-cylinder AER turbocharged engine. This was entered at Le Mans by the works team as the MG-Lola EX257, and was also run as the Lola B01/60 by private entrants. Later developments of this car have been fitted with assorted small V8s and the chassis was developed into recent customer LMP1 and LMP2 chassis.

An updated version of the Lola LMP2 came in 2005 with the introduction of the Lola B05/40 (also known as the MG-Lola EX264/265). It quickly became a contender in LMP2 by taking class honours in 2005 and 2006 at Le Mans with Ray Mallock Limited. It also earned several class wins in the American Le Mans Series in 2005 and 2006 with Intersport Racing, including a second-place overall finish in the 2006 12 Hours of Sebring. In 2007, extensive updates were made to the chassis, to accommodate the all-new Acura powerplant run by Fernandez Racing. In addition, an essentially brand new LMP2 prototype, the B07/40, was built to house the new AER-based Mazda engine. This new version is being run exclusively in the U.S. by B-K Motorsports.

Lola also updated its LMP1 challenger in 2006 with the introduction of the B06/10. The car was run in the American Le Mans Series by Dyson Racing and in the Le Mans Series and the 24 Hours of Le Mans by UK-based Chamberlain-Synergy Racing. Chamberlain continued to run the machine in 2007 and 2008, while the former Dyson cars have been run off and on in the ALMS by Cytosport Racing and Intersport Racing. As with its LMP2 program, the 2007 calendar year saw Lola introduce further upgrades with the debut of the B07/10, which saw action in the Le Mans Series and the 24 Hours of Le Mans with Charouz Racing and the Swiss Spirit team (using the same engine as the Audi R8).

Lola (in association with Tracy Krohn) took over the Multimatic franchise in Grand-Am's Daytona Prototype category in 2007. Krohn used his Riley cars at the 24 Hours of Daytona in 2008 but switched to the new cars later in the season.

Lola also introduced a pair of closed-cockpit Le Mans prototypes in 2008, the first of which is the B08/60 running in the P1 category. The first B08/60 was raced by the Charouz team (with assistance from Prodrive) and featured an Aston Martin V12 engine to GT1 specification.

The B08/80 built to P2 regulations was first raced by Sebah Racing (and Speedy Racing in the 2008 Le Mans 24 Hours) and continued racing in the 2009 and 2010 seasons.

=== 2010s ===
It was announced on 21 July 2010, that Lola would be building the B11/40 to comply with the new 2011 LMP2 regulations. The car was to be a carbon fibre open-top monocoque race car featuring an all-carbon bodykit, quick-release removable rear bodywork including a stabilization fin on the engine cover which is a safety requirement of the new regulations. However, on 16 May 2012, it was reported that Lola Cars was entering financial administration.

Multimatic, a subsequent owner of Lola assets, supplied two Lola B12/80 LMP2 chassis' to Mazda for IMSA WeatherTech SportsCar Championship competition. The cars were powered by turbocharged inline-four Mazda diesel powerplants in 2014 and 2015, and a gasoline-powered turbo inline-four in 2016. All of the WeatherTech Sports Car Championship's Prototype-class chassis were retired at the end of the 2016 season in favour of a new specification, marking the end of Mazda's use of the Lola chassis.

== Formula One ==
Lola as a Formula One chassis constructor
Formula One World Championship career
- Engines: Climax, BMW, Ford, Lamborghini, Ferrari
- Entrants: Bowmaker-Yeoman, Reg Parnell, Tim Parnell, DW Racing Enterprises, BMW, Lola Cars, Embassy Hill, Team Haas, Larrousse, Scuderia Italia, MasterCard Lola
- First entry: 1962 Dutch Grand Prix
- Last entry: 1997 Australian Grand Prix
- Races entered: 151
- Race victories: 0
- Constructors' Championships: 0
- Drivers' Championships: 0
- Podiums: 3
- Points: 43
- Pole positions: 1
- Fastest laps: 0

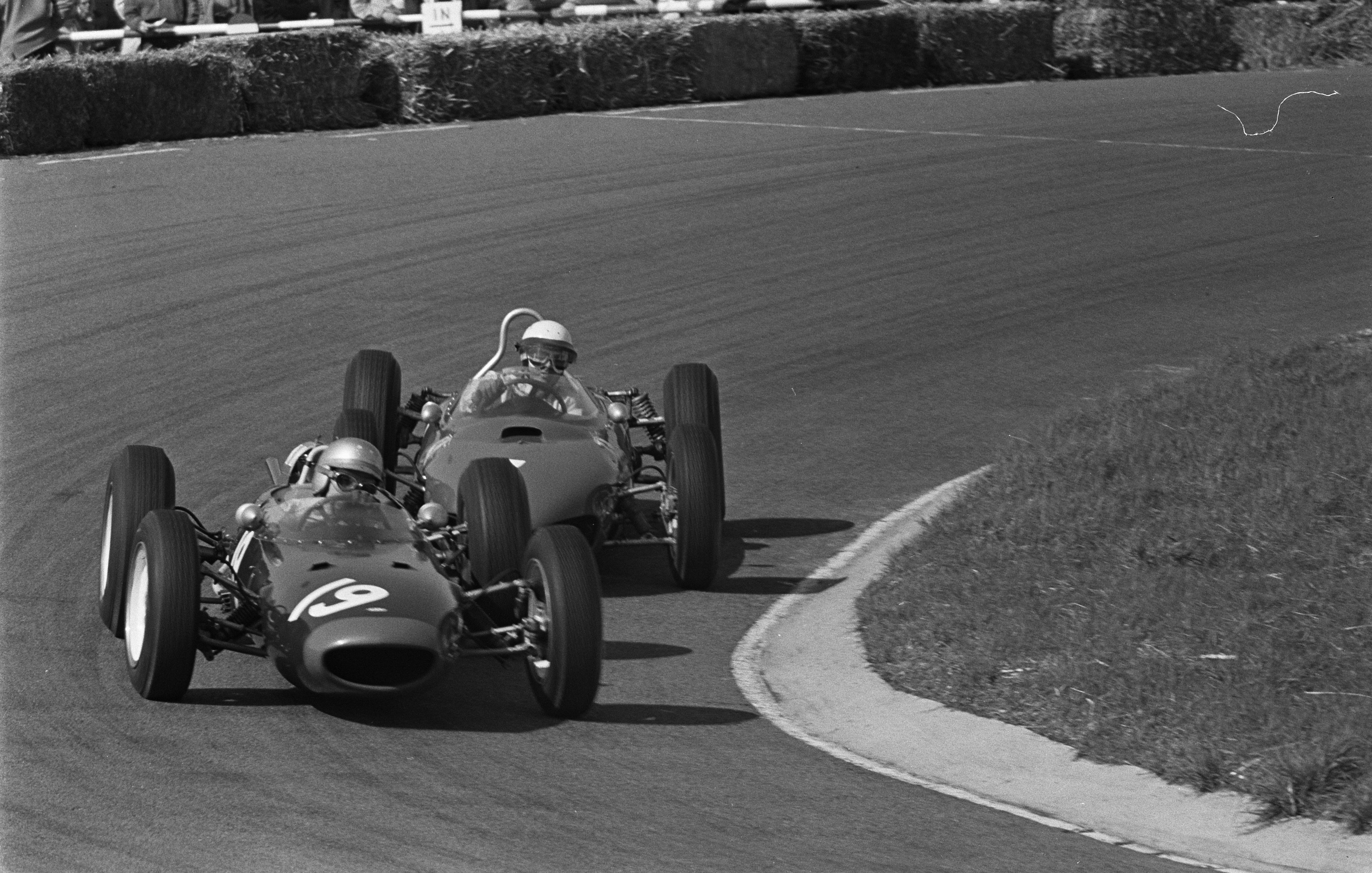
Lola Mk.4, the first Lola Formula 1, at 1962 Dutch GP driven by Surtees

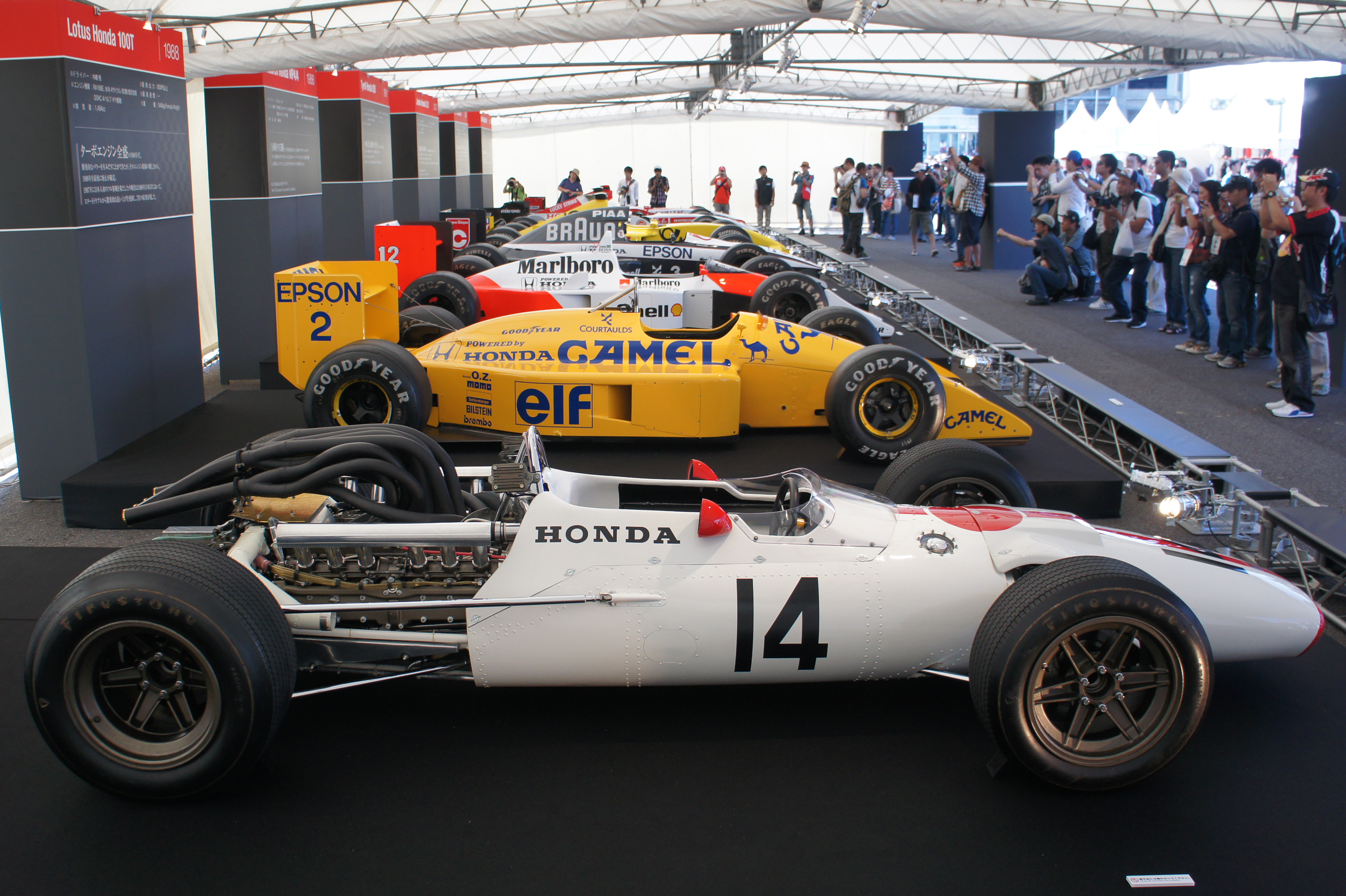
1967 Lola T130 'Hondola'

Lola resisted making a 'works' (i.e. a factory) Formula One entry for many years, being content to construct cars on behalf of other entrants. Lola's first works entry in 1997 led directly to the financial ruin of the company.

=== Bowmaker and Parnell ===
Lola made its first foray into Formula One in 1962, supplying Lola Mk4 cars to Reg Parnell's Bowmaker-Yeoman Racing Team, with John Surtees and Roy Salvadori as drivers. A measure of success was immediate, with Surtees's car claiming pole position in its first World Championship race, but although points were often scored, wins in Championship Grands Prix eluded the team. After Bowmaker's withdrawal, Parnell continued to run the cars privately. Privateer Bob Anderson gave the Mk4 its last victory, in the non-Championship 1963 Rome Grand Prix. Consistency, however, was not to be found, and after only two seasons, Lola abandoned Formula One cars for the time being.

=== "Hondola" Honda RA300 and RA301 ===
In 1967, Lola assisted Honda Racing and John Surtees with the design of their F1 car. The overweight chassis design by the engine-specialists from Honda was abandoned, and a 1966 Lola Indianapolis monocoque (Lola T90) used as the basis for a Honda-engined car. The resultant Honda RA300 was called the "Lola T130" by Lola Cars, unofficially called the "Hondola" by the press, and was sufficiently light and powerful to win the 1967 Italian Grand Prix.

=== BMW Formula Two cars ===
A number of Lola-built BMW F2 cars were subsequently entered in the F2 class of the German Grand Prix at about this time.

=== Embassy Hill ===
Towards the end of his long career, Graham Hill found it difficult to attract works drives; with a view to both finding a drive and a future as a team owner he established his own team backed by the Embassy cigarette brand. After an unsuccessful 1973 with a customer Shadow, the team commissioned its own cars from Lola. The T370 was largely based on the Formula 5000 cars of the time, and looked similar to Lola's F5000 cars, although it sported a larger airbox. The car was developed by Andy Smallman into the Hill GH1 in 1975, but the team's first in-house design, the Hill GH2, remained unraced when Hill, Tony Brise, Smallman and several other team personnel were killed in an air crash in November 1975.

=== Haas Lola ===
The Haas Lola F1 programme was extremely promising, funded by a large American industrial conglomerate Beatrice Foods and run by the highly experienced Teddy Mayer, with the promise of works Ford power, but it flattered to deceive. The car, designed mostly by Neil Oatley, was barely a Lola; the name was used largely because Haas was Lola's US concessionaire although Broadley had some (minimal) involvement with the car being named as Chief Engineer. Alan Jones was tempted out of retirement to drive it in F1 races towards the end of the 1985 season, with Patrick Tambay joining in a second car for 1986. A Cosworth designed and built works Ford turbocharged engine was promised, but this did not materialise until 1986 and old Hart four-cylinder units were used. Car, engine, drivers and sponsors were all troublesome and the team folded after the 1986 season with most of its assets (including the factory) being sold to Bernie Ecclestone. At one point during the season, Ecclestone informed the Haas Lola team that "his driver" (Patrese) would be in the car at the next meeting (though this never eventuated); Ecclestone was primarily interested in acquiring the Ford V6 engines as a replacement for the BMW units in his Brabhams but Ford vetoed this and terminated the Haas contract, offering the engines to Benetton instead. Ecclestone used the Haas team's factory in Colnbrook near Heathrow in west London to build the ill-fated Alfa Romeo "ProCar" (a series for "silhouette" touring cars with F1-style mechanicals and engines).

=== Larrousse & Calmels ===
The Larrousse & Calmels programme was initially much lower-key than the previous effort. Starting from a simple Cosworth-powered car based on Lola's F3000 technologies, the French team built up a steady reputation in normally aspirated F1 from 1987 on. They attracted Lamborghini V12 power for 1989 and once the Chris Murphy-designed car was on stream, scored some good results with Éric Bernard and Aguri Suzuki. The team experienced some problems after Didier Calmels's arrest for the murder of his wife, but continued at a slightly lower key with Cosworth power again. Unfortunately, due to irregularities with the team's F1 entry in 1990, (the cars were entered as Larrousses but were really Lolas) they lost all their Constructors' Championship points – which promoted the politically well-connected Ligier outfit into a position in the Constructors' Championship that gave them significant FIA benefits.

=== Scuderia Italia ===
The Scuderia Italia programme was something of a disaster from the start. The team had done reasonably well with Dallara chassis before, but turned to Lola for 1993. Powered by customer Ferrari engines, both engine and car seemed to be well off the pace, Michele Alboreto and Luca Badoer struggled to even qualify for races (upon his first drive of the T93/30 in a pre-season test at the Estoril circuit in Portugal, Alboreto, a 5 time Grand Prix winner, told the teams senior Engineer Alessandro Mariani "We're dead"). Badoer finished 7th in the 1993 San Marino Grand Prix, a race of high attrition, to score the best Lola result of the season. The team withdrew from F1 before the final two races of the season. It partly merged with Minardi for 1994.

=== Unraced test cars ===
Lola built a number of Cosworth V8 powered test cars in 1994–95, with rumours of a Havoline-funded quasi-works Ford team. The rumour was that Cosworth V12s badged Jaguar would go to Benetton, in fact no Ford/Jaguar V12 ran in F1 or elsewhere, and Lola would inherit the Zetec V8. Allan McNish did much of the test driving, but as this was a period of instability in the F1 rules little was achieved.

=== MasterCard-sponsored works programme ===
Lola had originally intended to enter Formula One in their own right in 1998, but pressure from main sponsor MasterCard caused Lola to debut its new car one year early, in 1997. The sponsorship model was curious, linked both to MasterCard membership of a 'club', and to results – something a first-year F1 team often finds hard to achieve. A custom-built V10 engine from Al Melling was going to be fitted to the cars, which initially started racing fitted with underpowered Ford Cosworth ECA V8s.

The cars had a lot of problems, the worst being aerodynamics – they had never even been tested in a wind-tunnel when they arrived in Australia, which by that point in time was unthinkable. The car was fundamentally flawed, and the lack of wind-tunnel time had made it even less competitive. Despite the car's problems, the team was confident that it could finish ahead of some of the other teams. The results were disastrous, the cars were well off the pace and were no faster than Lola's Formula 3000 cars. After only one race, the sponsors pulled out; the team turned up for the second race in Brazil but the cars did not turn a wheel and that was the end of the MasterCard Lola story. Shortly afterwards, the entire Lola Car Company went into receivership. The company was saved through the purchase and cash rescue package from Martin Birrane.

=== Planned 2010 project and 2019 comeback attempt ===
On 22 April 2009, Lola announced on its website that "Lola Group has commenced a major project comprising a full technical, operational and financial evaluation aimed at developing a car to compete in the FIA Formula One World Championship". Lola was one of several teams to lodge an entry with the FIA for the 2010 Formula One World Championship. On 17 June, however, the company abandoned its plans to return to F1 after failing to secure a place on the initial 2010 entry list.

The owner of the Force India team, Vijay Mallya, had intended to rename his team since mid-2017, however, this plan did not go ahead until the arrival of Lawrence Stroll, a Canadian billionaire, who bought Force India in 2018 and renamed as Racing Point. However, Stroll's intention was to get the rights to the name Lola (among others) to compete in the 2019 season. Stroll failed in this attempt, and Racing Point remained with that name, until rebranding to Aston Martin in 2021.

== Formula Two / Formula 3000 / A1GP ==
After its limited success in the 1960s with Formula One, Lola turned its attention primarily to sports cars but also to Formula Two, where Lola became the works team for BMW. As the years went on, Lola had somewhat more success in Formula Two than it ever had in Formula One, although as March and later Ralt established themselves, Lola's involvement in the category became intermittent and less successful. The final Lola F2 was derived from a Ralt design – the Ralt RT2 became the Toleman TG280, which Toleman licensed to Lola who productionised it as the T850. When Formula Two was replaced by Formula 3000 in 1985, Lola made a "false start" with a car based on their significantly larger Indycar chassis; from 1986 they returned with a bespoke F3000 design. Lola enjoyed significant success for the next few years, competing with Ralt and Reynard, although Reynard effectively wiped the others out of the market. In 1996 the International Formula 3000 Championship became a one-make series, and Lola was awarded the contract by the FIA to build the Lola T96/50 chassis for all teams competing in the championship. The contract which was renewed in 1999 (Lola B99/50) and 2002 (Lola B02/50) before International F3000 was replaced by GP2 and Lola lost the bid to build the new chassis.

Formula Nippon ran mixed grids of cars (with Reynard dominating) until 2003, when Lola was awarded that contract as well. The Euroseries 3000 used the B02/50 from 2007 to 2009, while the ex-A1GP B05/52 chassis was introduced in 2009.

Lola succeeded in winning the largest-ever contract for single-seater racing cars in 2005, the contract for the A1 Grand Prix series. Lola built 50 identical Zytek V8-powered A1 Grand Prix cars which were leased to the national franchisees (although the teams' spare cars were recalled part-way through the 2005 season to be used for spare parts); development work on these was strictly prohibited. The cars were approximately at the F3000 level of technology.

=== List of F3000 chassis ===
==== T950 ====
Lola has been supplying the car body since 1985, the first year of F3000. The body, named T950, was developed based on the IndyCar T800.

==== T86/50 ====
The T86/50, designed by Ralph Bellamy, who had transferred from March, was supplied to International F3000. Some of the vehicles used in the International F3000 were sold to Japanese teams and used in the All Japan F3000 Championship the following year.

==== T87/50 ====
It is a model that improved the T86/50 and made the monocoque made of carbon. In the International Formula 3000, Stefano Modena, who rides the March, won the championship, but in the All Japan F3000, which was the first year of the F3000 in 1987, as the season progressed, more teams switched from March to Lola, and Kazuyoshi Hoshino switched to Lola. Hoshino became the champion.

==== T88/50 ====
Developed for the 1988 season. In the All Japan F3000, Aguri Suzuki became the champion by making full use of both Reynard and March, and Kazuyoshi Hoshino was second in the series ranking in the Lola group.

==== T89/50 ====
In the All Japan F3000, Hitoshi Ogawa became the series champion (the 1988 machine was used in the early stages and the 1989 machine was used after the middle stage), and Lola's strength began to stand out. Reynard was the champion machine in International F3000.

==== T90/50 ====
Until T89/50, the engine part was exposed, but for the first time in this model, a cowl covering the engine was installed behind the roll bar. The intake to the engine is not behind the roll bar unlike the previous year, but introduced a design that is guided from the air duct next to the cockpit, similar to the Benetton B188. Kazuyoshi Hoshino, who dominated with the T90/50 in All Japan F3000, and Érik Comas, who raced for DAMS and drove the T90/50 in International F3000, became champions, and Reynard users changed to Lola in the middle of the season.

==== T91/50 ====
It looked a lot like the T90/50, but according to Lola, it was 80% new. This year, radial tyres were introduced into International F3000 and the suspension geometry was reviewed. Allan McNish, who had a hard time in International Formula 3000 driving for the previous year's champion team DAMS, failed to qualify in two of the opening three races. The car also struggled in All Japan F3000, and at the beginning of the season, many teams used the old T90/50, but as the season progressed, more teams introduced the T91/50.

==== T92/50 ====
A new underbody and front wing were adopted to correct the aerodynamic shortcomings of the T91/50 and increase stability. The Benetton-type air intake was removed, with the intake moved to the opening behind the roll bar. In International F3000 Lola continued to struggle, and the only victory was Jean-Marc Gounon's in the final race. At the start of the season, there were no T92/50s entered in All Japan F3000, but soon more than 10 cars entered the championship. Mauro Martini won the title in a Lola, and Toshio Suzuki of Lola took second place in the series ranking.

==== T93/50 ====
The T93/50 was an evolution of the previous year's model, but a new horizontal sequential gearbox made by Hewland was adopted. The T93/50 weighed between 20 kg and 25 kg over the specified weight. Journalist Manabu Kumano suggested that the very heavy weight of the new gearbox may be the main cause of the car being overweight, comparing the weight balance with the previous year's model T92/50. In All-Japan F3000, some teams took measures such as introducing lightweight under panels and transmission cases to reduce the weight of the rear of the machine and installing a T92/50 gearbox. No T93/50s were entered in International F3000 and it was used only in Japan. It won pole positions in Rounds 7 and 8 when the finals were cancelled due to heavy fog, but never recorded a victory. Kazuyoshi Hoshino, driving a Lola, won his third title in one of the manufacturer's cars, but Hoshino used the previous year's machine, which had abundant data available and was highly reliable. After the end of the International F3000 season, a T93/50 demonstration was held at a European circuit. The T93/50, driven by Vincenzo Sospiri, set a new time for Reynard, and Lola was confident in receiving orders from International F3000 teams for the coming season.

==== T94/50 ====
The car body became thinner overall, and the side pods became smaller and shorter. It was thought that this change would make it aerodynamically stable and less susceptible to the pitching of the car body. Changes were also made to the horizontal gearbox, which was pointed out to be overweight in the previous model. A new lightweight case with a total width of about 1 inch was created, and the airflow behind the vehicle was improved. The weight of the car was 530 kg, and 20 kg of ballast was needed to meet the regulations. Two teams, Nordic and Omegaland, used Lola in the International F3000, but the best result of the season was Nordic driver Jordi Gené's fourth place at the Circuit de Barcelona-Catalunya.

==== T95/50 ====
The body design has changed significantly from the T94/50. The machine won an International F3000 round for the first time since 1992, with Marc Goossens taking third place in the series. In All Japan F3000, it was used by Team Nova. The 1995 championship was won by Toshio Suzuki in a Lola, but this was the older T94/50.

==== T96/50 ====
In order to prevent the cost of entering International F3000 from rising, it became a spec series, using a Lola chassis and a Judd engine, eliminating competition in terms of hardware. International F3000 ended in 2004, but in Euroseries 3000 Championship, which used the old chassis, the Lola chassis was used consistently until the end of the 2009 series.

== Formula 5000 ==
In the late 1960s, the SCCA's Formula A series evolved into Formula 5000 and attracted the attention of more professional drivers and teams. It was intended to be a cheap, high-powered open-wheeled racing series using relatively cheap tuned stock-block V8 engines. Lola entered this market as well, and after some interesting struggles with McLaren, Team Surtees and Chevron, came to dominate the later years of the series, producing the bulk of Formula 5000 cars throughout the 1970s – these competed in F5000 in Europe, the US and Australasia. The cars continued when the CanAm series was revived using Formula 5000 cars as the base. Lola made a seamless switch into this kind of "sports car racing", and won five consecutive Can-Am championships.

== USAC / CART / Champ Car ==
Lola had built chassis for the Indianapolis 500 as early as the 1960s – Graham Hill had won the 1966 Indianapolis 500 in a Lola, and Jackie Stewart raced a four-wheel drive Lola there. Al Unser won the 1978 Indianapolis 500 race in a modified Lola chassis. However, the marque did not make a fully fledged attack on the American open wheel market until the mid-1980s.

The revived CanAm was a fading series which collapsed in 1986, prompting Lola to move its focus to CART and the Indianapolis 500 beginning in 1983 with Mario Andretti driving a Lola for the new Newman/Haas Racing that year. Once again, Lola showed its ability to succeed in all motorsports outside of Formula One, pushing March down to one team for the 1990 CART season, and out of the series altogether by 1991. Six years after its full-time entrance into Indycar racing, Lola triumphed at Indy again, as the winning car for Arie Luyendyk in the 1990 Indianapolis 500.

The rivalry between Lola and Reynard continued in the United States as well as the European F3000 series. Reynard entered CART in 1994 and eventually almost completely displaced Lola from the market. By 1998 only the backmarker Davis Racing team was utilizing the Lola chassis, with Penske Racing using their own chassis, Newman/Haas Racing and Della Penna Motorsports using the new Swift Chassis, All American Racers running their own Eagle chassis, and all others running Reynards. However, when Penske Racing elected to abandon their proprietary chassis in 1999, they elected to run Lolas for the rest of that season, switching to Reynard for 2000 and 2001. Newman/Haas and Chip Ganassi Racing switched to Lolas in running the cars the following year. By 2001 the field was evenly split between the two cars.

Reynard's financial trouble and the fact that many of the top teams running the Reynard switched to the Indy Racing League IndyCar Series in 2002 and 2003 meant that development on the Reynard largely ceased. By 2003 Lola was the only remaining manufacturer building new chassis for the Champ Car series. For the 2007 season, Champ Car switched to a spec Panoz chassis, the DP01, as its new chassis used by all competitors. The previous Lola, the B02/00, had been in the series since the 2002 season.

Lola also produced the spec chassis for the CART Indy Lights developmental series that was used from 1993 to 2001, replacing the previous car that was essentially a modified March 85B Formula 3000 car.

For the IndyCar ICONIC project, Lola pitched its own design, tentatively designated B12/00 for the oval variant, and B12/01 for the road course variant. It would also have an Indy Lights variant. The design was tested in a wind tunnel, but never reached production as IndyCar opted for a Dallara design.

== Formula E ==
(United Kingdom) Lola Formula E Team
- Founded: 2024
- Base: Silverstone, Northamptonshire, United Kingdom
- Team principal(s): Mark Preston (Team Principal); Gerry Hughes (Deputy Team Principal)
- Current series: Formula E
- Current drivers: 11. (Brazil) Enzo Fittipaldi; 35. (Israel) Robert Shwartzman
- Noted drivers: (Brazil) Lucas di Grassi (Barbados) Zane Maloney
- Races: 33
- Wins: 1
- Podiums: 2
- Poles: 0
- Points: 67
- First entry: 2024 São Paulo ePrix (December)
- Last entry: 2026 London ePrix (Race 2)
- First win: 2026 Shanghai ePrix (Race 2)
- Last win: 2026 Shanghai ePrix (Race 2)
- Website: lola-fe.com

=== 2024-25 (Season 11) ===
In March 2024, it was announced Lola would make its return to single-seater racing in the 2024–25 season of Formula E World Championship as a powertrain supplier in a technical partnership with Yamaha. A month later, Lola–Yamaha secured Abt as its first powertrain customer for the 2024–25 season onwards, with the team entering the season as Lola Yamaha Abt Formula E Team with Lucas di Grassi and Zane Maloney as the driver pairing. In November, it was announced that Lola had taken over Abt's Formula E entrants' licence. Abt continued to run the team operationally.

The team scored its first podium finish at the Miami ePrix with di Grassi finishing in second. Lola Yamaha Abt also got points in Shanghai ePrix, from di Grassi finishing in 9th place. At Yamaha and Lola's home races of the Tokyo ePrix & London ePrix, di Grassi finished in 5th and 9th places respectively. During Abt's home race at the Berlin ePrix, Lola Yamaha Abt raced a special Superman livery of the car, following team’s collaboration with DC.

In the following 2025-26 season, Lola Yamaha Abt retained their lineup of Lucas di Grassi and Zane Maloney, the latter scoring a point in the opening race in São Paulo. Despite this, the team scored no points until rounds 9 and 10 at the Monaco ePrix, with di Grassi finishing 8th and 9th in both rounds, and Maloney scoring 10th in the second race.

During the non-championship Evo Sessions event following the Jeddah ePrix in February, their entry was piloted by Izzy Hammond, daughter of former Top Gear host Richard Hammond, for the Senor Frogs squad.

Hammond qualified 7th out of the 10 entries, and was scheduled to duel against fellow automotive content creator Juca Viapri, but he could not start due to a crash in practice. Despite no real push lap needed, Hammond collided with the wall on the exit of turn 13, destroying the car and registering a 25G impact, luckily she walked away with no significant injuries.

Prior to the Berlin ePrix, di Grassi announced that he would be retiring from Formula E and professional racing as a whole following the conclusion of the 2026 season.

Following the team’s double points finish in Monaco, di Grassi scored a point by finishing 10th in the Sanya ePrix. Then, despite qualifying 19th, di Grassi battled with Jean-Éric Vergne and Joel Eriksson for the lead in a mixed-conditions race, and went on to win the second race in Shanghai. This was the first win for di Grassi in the Gen3 era of Formula E, and his first since the 2022 London ePrix, as well as the first ever win for the team as a whole.

Despite this strong result, in the concluding four rounds in Tokyo and London, the team only earned one point, with Maloney finishing 10th in Tokyo. Di Grassi encountered a mechanical issue in both London races, resulting in him retiring from both. Lola Yamaha ABT concluded the season with 35 points and finished 10th in the standings out of 10 teams.

=== 2025-26 (Season 12) ===
Both di Grassi and Maloney were retained for Season 12. Maloney gained his first points in his Formula E career at the season opener in São Paulo, placing tenth. Di Grassi would later win the second race at Shanghai. The team concluded the season at last place with 35 points.

In January 2026, Abt announced it would part ways with Lola following the season. In April, Di Grassi announced his retirement from active motorsport competition following the season. Maloney also departed the team to join Nissan.

=== 2026-27 (Season 13) ===
The team rebranded to the Lola Formula E Team, while Yamaha would still remain as a technical partner. The team also appointed Gerry Hughes as deputy team principal, after Frederic Espinos left the team to join Citroën.

== Other motorsport activities ==
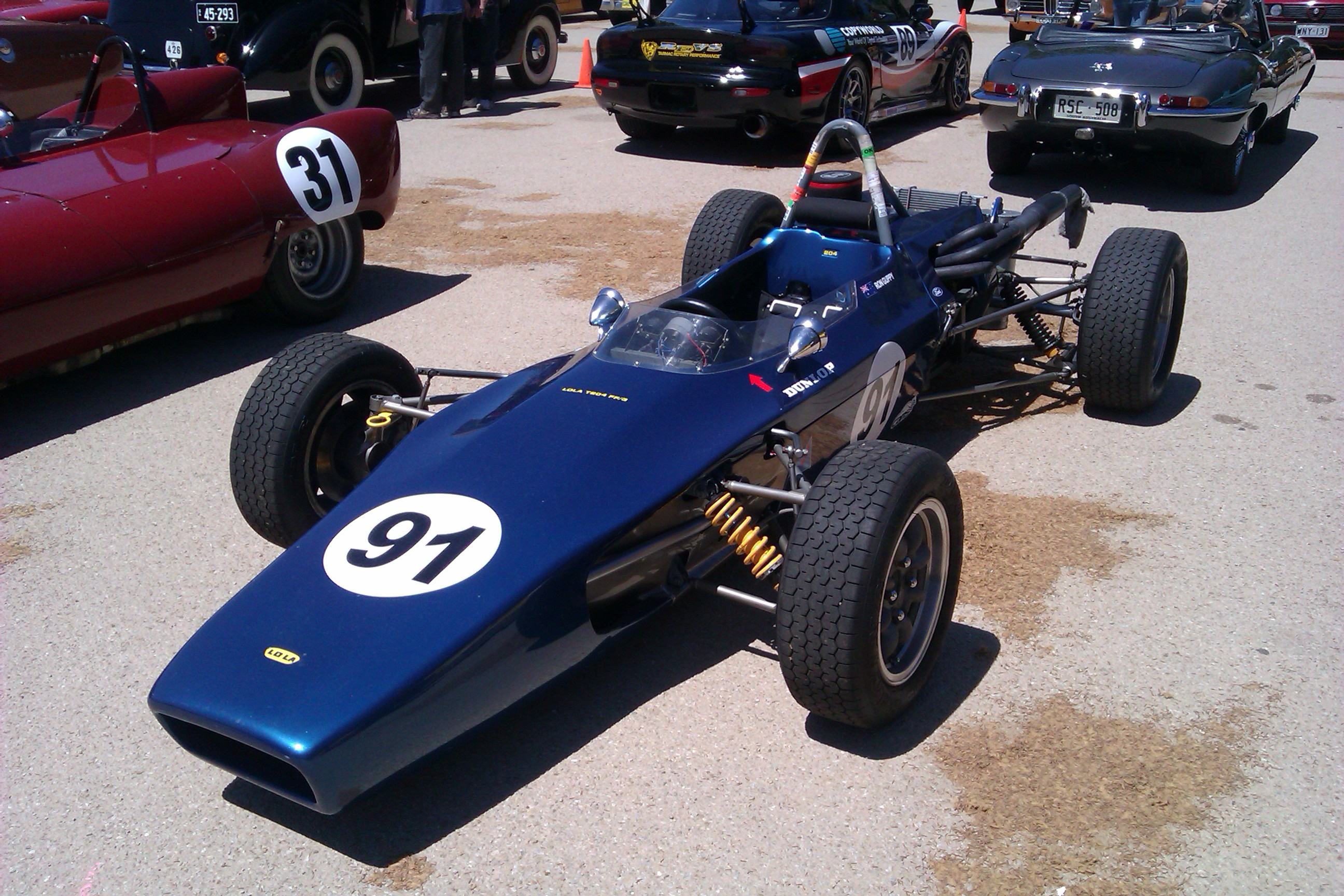
Lola T204, built in 1971 for Formula Ford

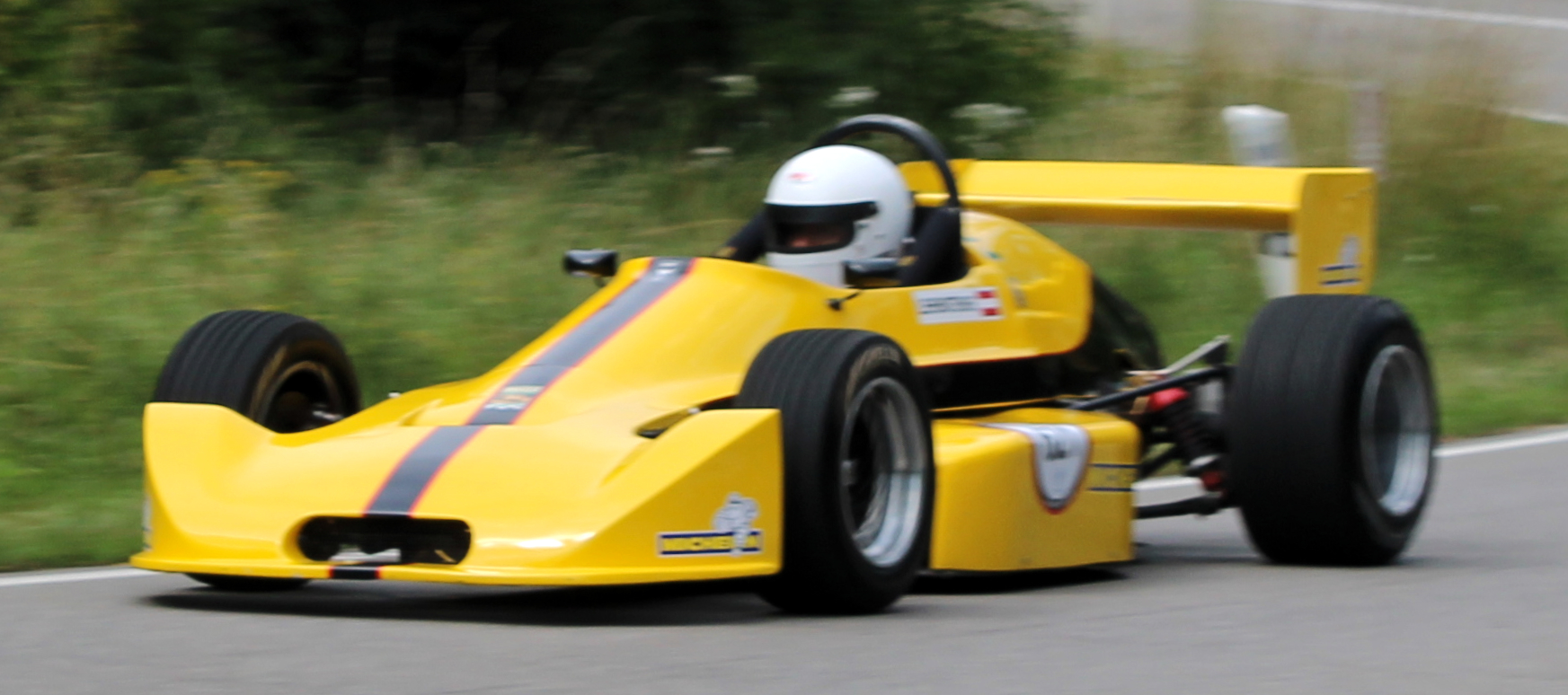
1978 Lola T580, built for Formula Ford 2000

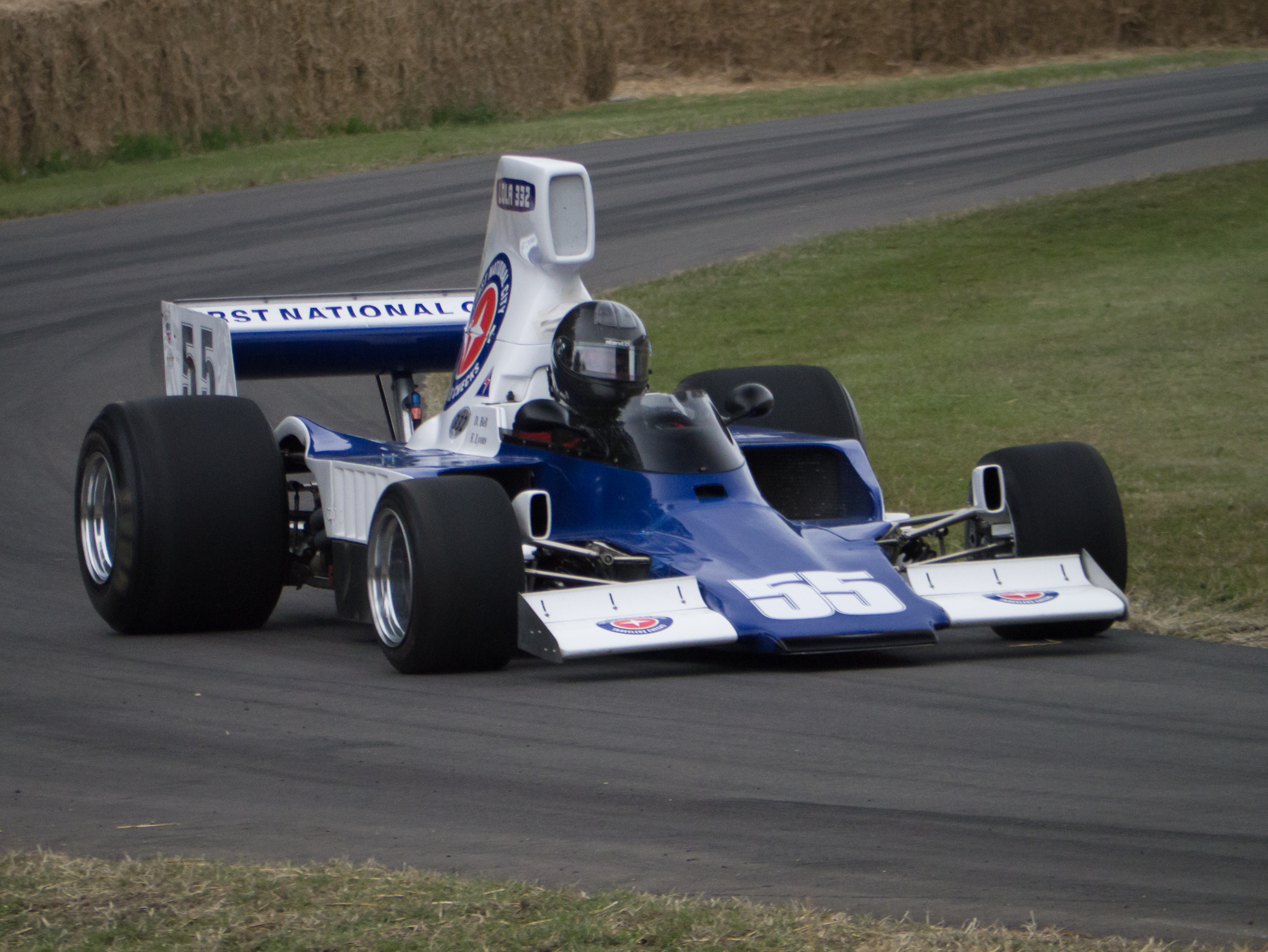
A 1974 Lola-Chevrolet T330-2 at the 2015 Goodwood Festival of Speed

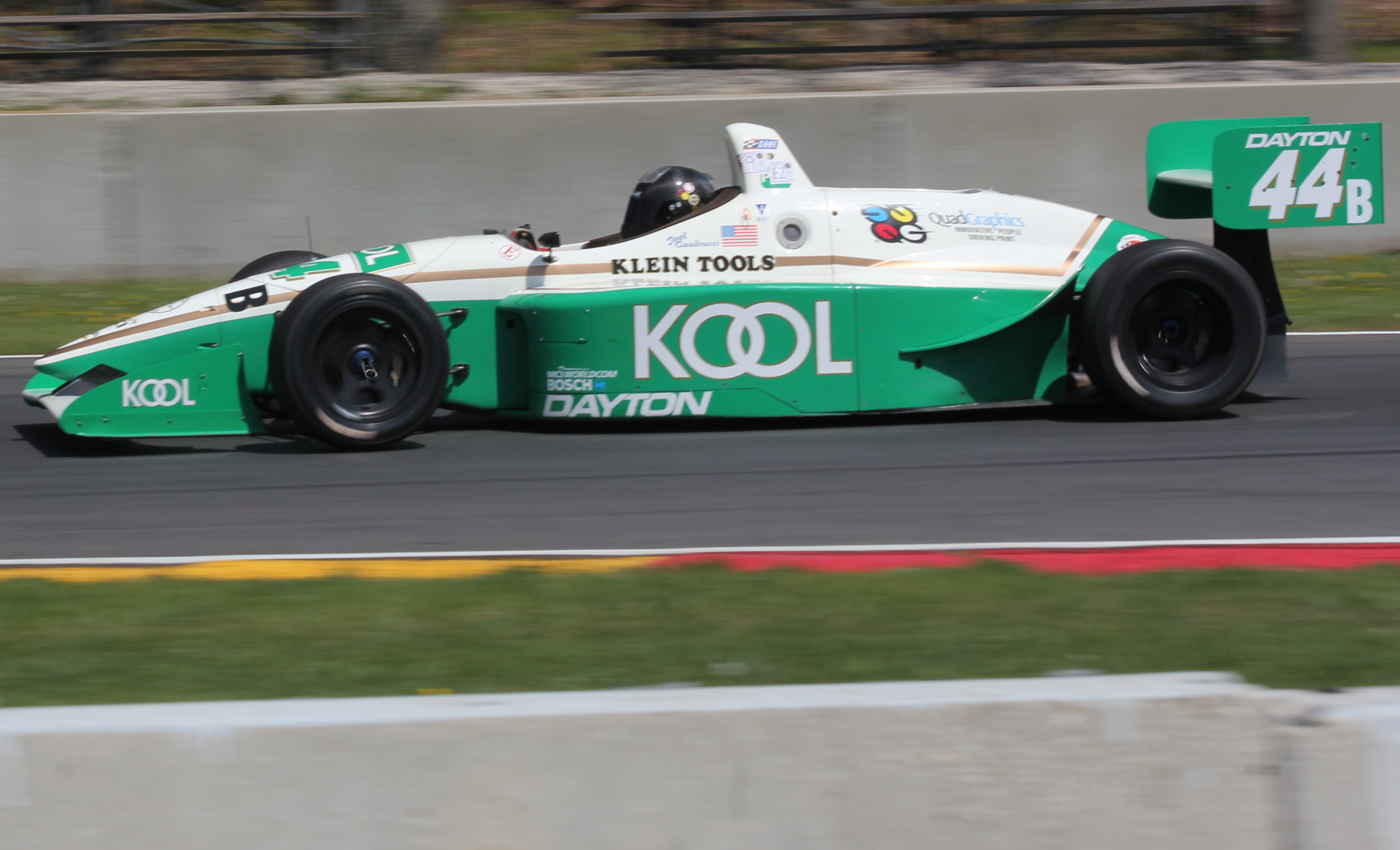
Lola B9720 Indy Lights Car

Lola built chassis for a wide range of minor categories over the years. Formula Atlantic cars tended to be derived from F2 and F3 designs, and other Lolas raced in Formula Ford, Sports 2000, Formula Super Vee and many other categories, often designed by people who went on to successful careers elsewhere in the sport. For example, Patrick Head of Williams fame designed his first cars for Broadley. There was not much profit margin in the minor-formulae cars, which tended to be built during the summer when the factory was otherwise quiet (most senior-formulae cars are built over the winter in the off-season) – but they kept staff occupied, gave designers somewhere to learn, and established relationships with drivers at early stages of their careers.

=== Formula 3 ===
In Formula 3, Lola partnered with Dome of Japan to produce a chassis in 2003. There they were competing with long-established Dallara, the two makers being among the last specialty race-car manufacturers in Europe. The partnership was broken in 2005, with Lola building their own chassis which won its debut race in the British series, but the Dallara near-monopoly held.

=== World Rally ===
The Lancer WRC04 with the 4G63 engine was mounted to a 5-speed semi-automatic transmission and a new all-wheel drive system co-developed by Ricardo Consulting Engineers and Mitsubishi Motors Motorsports (MMSP). The bodywork was subjected to extensive aerodynamic testing at Lola Cars' wind tunnel and significant changes to body were made after that.

== Naming scheme ==
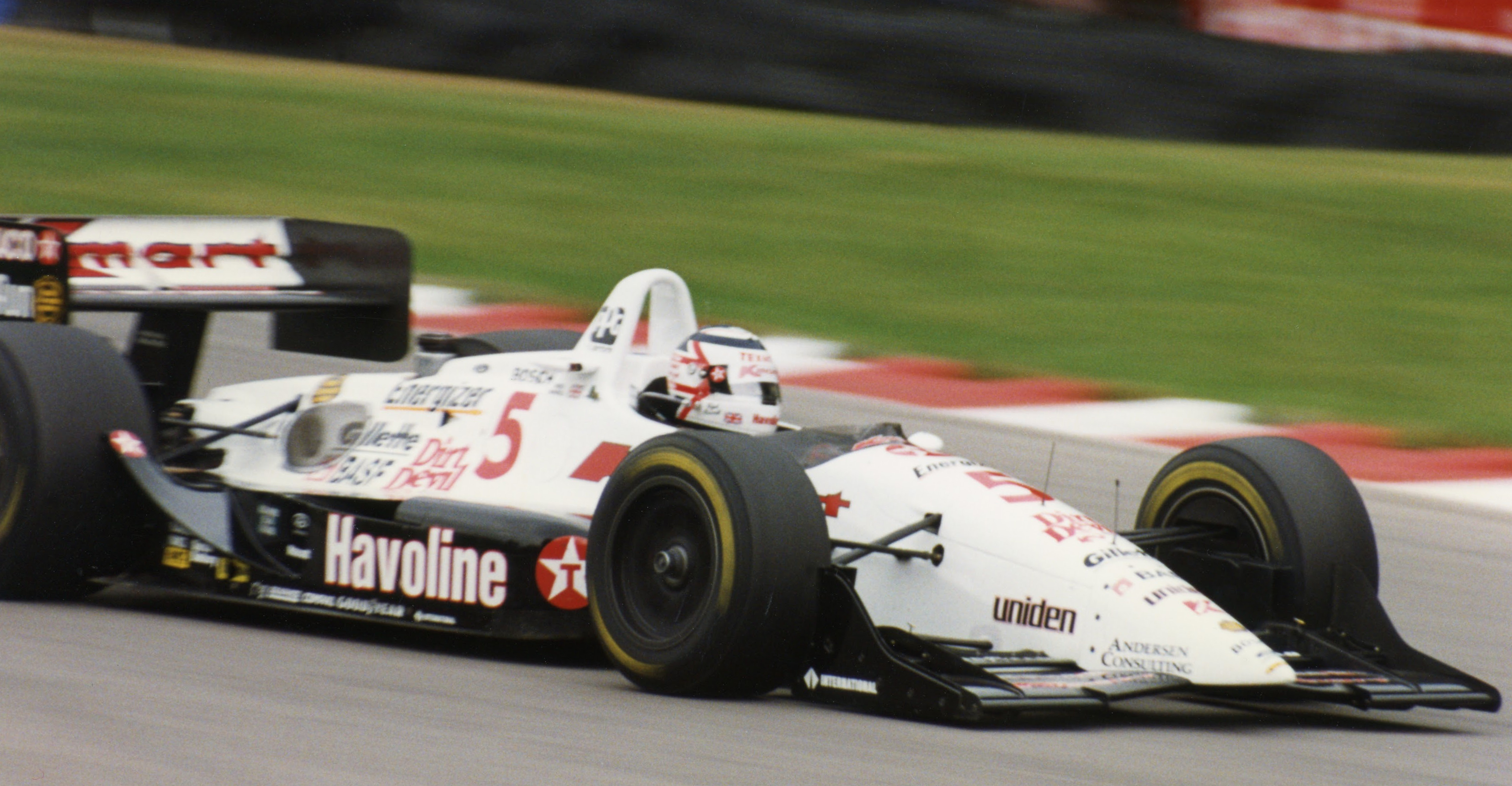
Lola T93/00 CART IndyCar

At the time of Lola's creation, their sports cars and formula cars followed a naming scheme of being numbered in order of construction, and preceded by the term Mark (Mk1 through Mk6). However, in 1964, the designations were altered to become Type (marked as simply T), with the first digit or two designating what type of car, and the final digit designating a variant of that car. This continued until 1986 when the numbering scheme was slightly altered. The T would remain, yet the next two digits would designate the year of original design, and the next two would designate what type of car it was. The final digit would again denote variants of that design. This was again slightly altered in 1998, with the T being replaced by a B, in honor of Lola's owner Martin Birrane. The numbering system would however remain the same.

Since employing the new system in 1986, the final two digits stand for the following types of cars:

- /00 – American open-wheel racing (CART, Champ Car, IndyCar)
- /10 – Group C and IMSA GTP, Le Mans Prototype SR1, LMP900, and LMP1 classes
- /20 – Indy Lights
- /30 – Formula One, later replaced by Formula Three
- /40 – Le Mans Prototype SR2 and LMP2 classes
- /50 – Formula 3000 and Formula Nippon
- /60 – Le Mans Prototype LMP675 class, later LMP1 Coupes
- /70 – Mexican Formula 3000, later touring cars, now Daytona Prototypes
- /80 – Le Mans Prototype LMP2 Coupes
- /90 – Sports 2000

Therefore, a car like the T92/10 would be a 1992 Group C car, and the B02/00 would be a 2002 Champ Car chassis.

Note that the Lola former A1 Grand Prix cars currently do not have a designation that matches this scheme, and are marked simply as Lola A1GP. The evolution of this car used in the Euroseries 3000 and its immediate successor AutoGP was given the name B0552.

== Racecars ==
Overview of Lola racecars
Year	Car	Category
1958	Lola Mk1	Sports Racing Car
1962	Lola Mk4	Formula One
1963	Lola Mk6	Experimental Grand Touring
1964	Lola T54	Formula Two
1965	Lola T60	Formula Two
1965	Lola T70	Group 7
1965	Lola T80	IndyCar
1966	Lola T61	Formula Two
1966	Lola T90	IndyCar
1967	Lola T100	Formula One; Formula Two
1967	Lola T110	Group 6 Group 7
1967	Lola T120	Group 7
1968	Lola T102	Formula One; Formula Two
1968	Lola T140	Formula 5000
1968	Lola T150	IndyCar
1968	Lola T160	Group 7
1969	BMW 269	Formula One; Formula Two
1969	Lola T190	Formula 5000
1970	Lola T210	Group 6
1971	Lola T220	Group 7
1971	Lola T260	Group 7
1971	Lola T300	Formula 5000
1972	Lola T270	IndyCar
1972	Lola T280	Group 5 Group 6
1972	Lola T290	Group 5
1972	Lola T310	Group 7
1973	Lola T292	Group 6
1973	Lola T330	Formula 5000
1973	Lola T332	Formula 5000
1973	Lola T400	Formula 5000
1974	Lola T294	Group 6
1974	Lola T370	Formula One
1975	Lola T371	Formula One
1975	Lola T380	Group 5
1975	Lola T390	Sports 2000
1976	Lola T296	Group 6 prototype
1976	Lola T430	Formula 5000
1977	Lola T297	Group 6 prototype
1977	Lola T333CS	Group 7
1977	Lola T490	Group 5 Sports 2000
1978	Lola T298	Group 6 prototype
1978	Lola T500	IndyCar
1978	Spyder NF-10	Group 7
1980	Lola T530	Group 7
1980	Lola T590	C Sports; Sports 2000
1981	Lola T299	Group 6 prototype
1981	Lola T600	Group C IMSA GTP
1981	Lola T850	Formula Two
1981	Lola T860	Formula Atlantic
1981	VDS-001	Can-Am
1982	Lola T610	Group C
1983	Lola T700	IndyCar
1984	Lola T616	Group C IMSA GTP
1984	Lola T800	IndyCar
1985	Lola T900	IndyCar
1985	Lola T950	Formula 3000
1985	Lola THL1	Formula One
1986	Lola T86/00	IndyCar
1986	Lola T86/50	Formula 3000
1986	Lola T86/90	Sports 2000
1986	Lola THL2	Formula One
1987	Lola LC87	Formula One
1987	Lola T87/00	IndyCar
1987	Lola T87/50	Formula 3000
1988	Lola LC88	Formula One
1988	Lola T88/00	IndyCar
1988	Lola T88/50	Formula 3000
1989	Lola LC89	Formula One
1989	Lola T89/00	IndyCar
1989	Lola T89/50	Formula 3000
1989	Lola T89/90	Sports 2000
1990	Lola LC90	Formula One
1990	Lola T90/00	IndyCar
1990	Lola T90/50	Formula 3000
1990	Lola T90/90	Sports 2000
1991	Lola LC91	Formula One
1991	Lola T91/00	IndyCar
1991	Lola T91/50	Formula 3000
1991	Lola Horag HSB	Sports 2000/Interserie Division II
1992	Lola T92/00	IndyCar
1992	Lola T92/10	Group C
1992	Lola T92/50	Formula 3000
1993	Lola T93/00	IndyCar
1993	Lola T93/20	Indy Lights
1993	Lola T93/30	Formula One
1993	Lola T93/50	Formula 3000
1994	Lola T94/00	IndyCar
1994	Lola T94/20	Indy Lights
1994	Lola T94/50	Formula 3000
1995	Lola T95/00	IndyCar
1995	Lola T95/20	Indy Lights
1995	Lola T95/30	Formula One (Unraced)
1995	Lola T95/50	Formula 3000
1996	Lola T96/00	IndyCar
1996	Lola T96/20	Indy Lights
1996	Lola T96/50	Formula 3000
1996	Lola T96/70	Formula 3000
1997	Lola T97/00	IndyCar
1997	Lola T97/20	Indy Lights
1997	Lola T97/30	Formula One
1998	Lola T98/00	IndyCar
1999	Lola B98/10	WSC; LMP
1999	Lola B99/00	IndyCar
1999	Lola B99/50	Formula 3000
2000	Lola B2K/00	IndyCar
2000	Lola B2K/10	LMP900; SR1
2000	Lola B2K/40	Le Mans Prototype
2001	Lola B01/00	IndyCar
2001	MG-Lola EX257	LMP675
2002	Lola B02/00	IndyCar
2002	Lola B02/50	Formula 3000
2003	Lola B03/51	Formula Nippon
2005	Lola A1GP	A1 Grand Prix
2005	Lola B05/40	LMP2
2006	Lola B06/10	LMP1
2006	Lola B06/51	Formula Nippon
2008	Lola B08/60	LMP1
2008	Proto-Auto Lola B08/70	Daytona Prototype
2008	Lola B08/80	LMP1; LMP2
2009	Lola-Aston Martin B09/60	LMP1
2009	Lola B05/52	Auto GP
2009	Lola B09/60	LMP1
2010	Lola B10/30	Formula One (Unraced)
2010	Lola B10/60	LMP1
2010	Caterham-Lola SP/300.R	Group CN
2011	Lola B11/40	LMP2
2012	Lola B12/60	LMP1
2024	Lola-Yamaha T001	Formula E

== Racing results ==
=== Complete Formula One World Championship results ===
Key

Key
Colour	Result
Gold	Winner
Silver	Second place
Bronze	Third place
Green	Other points position
Blue	Other classified position
Blue	Not classified, finished (NC)
Purple	Not classified, retired (Ret)
Red	Did not qualify (DNQ)
Red	Did not pre-qualify (DNPQ)
Black	Disqualified (DSQ)
White	Did not start (DNS)
White	Race cancelled (C)
Light blue	Practiced only (PO)
Light blue	Thursday/Friday test driver (TD) (from 2003 onwards)
Blank	Did not practice (DNP)
Blank	Excluded (EX)
Blank	Did not arrive (DNA)
Blank	Withdrawn (WD)
Annotation	Meaning
P	Pole position
F	Fastest lap
Abbreviation	Meaning
WDC	World Drivers' Championship position
WCC	World Constructors' Championship position
NC	Not classified

Year	Entrant(s)	Chassis	Engine(s)	Drivers	1	2	3	4	5	6	7	8	9	10	11	12	13	14	15	16	17	Points	WCC
1962					NED	MON	BEL	FRA	GBR	GER	ITA	USA	RSA									19	4th
1962	Bowmaker-Yeoman Racing Team	Mk4	Climax FWMV; V8	(United Kingdom) John Surtees	Ret^{P}	4	5	5	2	2	Ret	Ret	Ret									19	4th
1962	Bowmaker-Yeoman Racing Team	Mk4	Climax FWMV; V8	(United Kingdom) Roy Salvadori	Ret	Ret		Ret	Ret	Ret	Ret	DNS	Ret									19	4th
1963					MON	BEL	NED	FRA	GBR	GER	ITA	USA	MEX	RSA								0	NC
1963	Reg Parnell Racing	Mk4A	Climax FWMV; V8	(France) Maurice Trintignant	Ret																	0	NC
1963	Reg Parnell Racing	Mk4A	Climax FWMV; V8	(New Zealand) Chris Amon	DNS	Ret	Ret	7	7	Ret	DNS											0	NC
1963	Reg Parnell Racing	Mk4A	Climax FWMV; V8	(Belgium) Lucien Bianchi		Ret																0	NC
1963	Reg Parnell Racing	Mk4A	Climax FWMV; V8	(United States) Masten Gregory								Ret	Ret									0	NC
1963	Reg Parnell Racing	Mk4A	Climax FWMV; V8	(United Kingdom) Mike Hailwood							10											0	NC
1963	Tim Parnell	Mk4	Climax FWMV; V8	(United Kingdom) John Campbell-Jones					13													0	NC
1963	DW Racing Enterprises	Mk4	Climax FWMV; V8	(United Kingdom) Bob Anderson					12		12											0	NC
1967					RSA	MON	NED	BEL	FRA	GBR	GER	CAN	ITA	USA	MEX							0	NC
1967	Bayerische Motoren Werke	T100	BMW M10; S4	(Germany) Hubert Hahne							Ret											0	NC
1967	Lola Cars Ltd.	T100	BMW M10; S4	(United Kingdom) David Hobbs							10											0	NC
1967	David Bridges	T100	Ford Cosworth FVA; S4	(United Kingdom) Brian Redman							DNS											—N/a	
1968					RSA	ESP	MON	BEL	NED	FRA	GBR	GER	ITA	CAN	USA	MEX						0	NC
1968	Bayerische Motoren Werke	T102	BMW M12/1; S4	(Germany) Hubert Hahne								10										0	NC
1974					ARG	BRA	RSA	ESP	BEL	MON	SWE	NED	FRA	GBR	GER	AUT	ITA	CAN	USA			1	12th
1974	Embassy Hill	T370	Ford Cosworth DFV; V8	(United Kingdom) Graham Hill	Ret	11	12	Ret	8	7	6	Ret	13	13	9	12	8	14	8			1	12th
1974	Embassy Hill	T370	Ford Cosworth DFV; V8	(United Kingdom) Guy Edwards	11	Ret		DNQ	12	8	7	Ret	15	DNS	DNQ							1	12th
1974	Embassy Hill	T370	Ford Cosworth DFV; V8	(United Kingdom) Peter Gethin										Ret								1	12th
1974	Embassy Hill	T370	Ford Cosworth DFV; V8	(Germany) Rolf Stommelen												Ret	Ret	11	12			1	12th
1975					ARG	BRA	RSA	ESP	MON	BEL	SWE	NED	FRA	GBR	GER	AUT	ITA	USA				0	NC
1975	Embassy Hill	T370; T371	Ford Cosworth DFV; V8	(United Kingdom) Graham Hill	10	12	DNQ															0	NC
1975	Embassy Hill	T370; T371	Ford Cosworth DFV; V8	(Germany) Rolf Stommelen	13	14	7															0	NC
1985					BRA	POR	SMR	MON	CAN	DET	FRA	GBR	GER	AUT	NED	ITA	BEL	EUR	RSA	AUS		0	NC
1985	Team Haas	THL1	Hart 415T; S4 (t/c)	(Australia) Alan Jones												Ret		Ret	DNS	Ret		0	NC
1986					BRA	ESP	SMR	MON	BEL	CAN	DET	FRA	GBR	GER	HUN	AUT	ITA	POR	MEX	AUS		6	8th
1986	Team Haas	THL1	Hart 415T; S4 (t/c)	(Australia) Alan Jones	Ret	Ret																6	8th
1986	Team Haas	THL1	Hart 415T; S4 (t/c)	(France) Patrick Tambay	Ret	8	Ret															6	8th
1986	Team Haas	THL2	Ford GBA; V6 (t/c)	(Australia) Alan Jones			Ret	Ret	11	10	Ret	Ret	Ret	9	Ret	4	6	Ret	Ret	Ret		6	8th
1986	Team Haas	THL2	Ford GBA; V6 (t/c)	(France) Patrick Tambay				Ret	Ret	DNS		Ret	Ret	8	7	5	Ret	NC	Ret	NC		6	8th
1986	Team Haas	THL2	Ford GBA; V6 (t/c)	(United States) Eddie Cheever							Ret											6	8th
1987					BRA	SMR	BEL	MON	DET	FRA	GBR	GER	HUN	AUT	ITA	POR	ESP	MEX	JPN	AUS		3	9th
1987	Larrousse Calmels	LC87	Ford Cosworth DFZ; V8	(France) Yannick Dalmas														9	14	5		3	9th
1987	Larrousse Calmels	LC87	Ford Cosworth DFZ; V8	(France) Philippe Alliot		10	8	Ret	Ret	Ret	Ret	6	Ret	12	Ret	Ret	6	6	Ret	Ret		3	9th
1988					BRA	SMR	MON	MEX	CAN	DET	FRA	GBR	GER	HUN	BEL	ITA	POR	ESP	JPN	AUS		0	NC
1988	Larrousse Calmels	LC88	Ford Cosworth DFZ; V8	(France) Yannick Dalmas	Ret	12	7	9	DNQ	7	13	13	19	9	Ret	Ret	Ret	11				0	NC
1988	Larrousse Calmels	LC88	Ford Cosworth DFZ; V8	(France) Philippe Alliot	Ret	17	Ret	Ret	10	Ret	Ret	14	Ret	12	9	Ret	Ret	14	9	10		0	NC
1988	Larrousse Calmels	LC88	Ford Cosworth DFZ; V8	(Japan) Aguri Suzuki															16			0	NC
1988	Larrousse Calmels	LC88	Ford Cosworth DFZ; V8	(France) Pierre-Henri Raphanel																DNQ		0	NC
1989					BRA	SMR	MON	MEX	USA	CAN	FRA	GBR	GER	HUN	BEL	ITA	POR	ESP	JPN	AUS		1	16th
1989	Equipe Larrousse	LC88B; LC89	Lamborghini 3512; V12	(France) Philippe Alliot	12	Ret	Ret	Ret	Ret	Ret	Ret	Ret	Ret	DNPQ	16	Ret	9	6	Ret	Ret		1	16th
1989	Equipe Larrousse	LC88B; LC89	Lamborghini 3512; V12	(France) Yannick Dalmas	DNQ	Ret	DNQ	DNQ	DNQ	DNQ												1	16th
1989	Equipe Larrousse	LC88B; LC89	Lamborghini 3512; V12	(France) Éric Bernard							11	Ret										1	16th
1989	Equipe Larrousse	LC88B; LC89	Lamborghini 3512; V12	(Italy) Michele Alboreto									Ret	Ret	Ret	Ret	11	DNPQ	DNQ	DNPQ		1	16th
1990					USA	BRA	SMR	MON	CAN	MEX	FRA	GBR	GER	HUN	BEL	ITA	POR	ESP	JPN	AUS		11	6th
1990	Espo Larrousse F1	LC89B; LC90	Lamborghini 3512; V12	(France) Éric Bernard	8	Ret	13	6	9	Ret	8	4	Ret	6	9	Ret	Ret	Ret	Ret	Ret		11	6th
1990	Espo Larrousse F1	LC89B; LC90	Lamborghini 3512; V12	(Japan) Aguri Suzuki	Ret	Ret	Ret	Ret	12	Ret	7	6	Ret	Ret	Ret	Ret	14	6	3	Ret		11	6th
1991					USA	BRA	SMR	MON	CAN	MEX	FRA	GBR	GER	HUN	BEL	ITA	POR	ESP	JPN	AUS		2	11th
1991	Larrousse	LC91	Ford Cosworth DFR; V8	(France) Éric Bernard	Ret	Ret	9	Ret	6	Ret	Ret	Ret	Ret	Ret	Ret	DNQ	Ret	DNQ	DNQ			2	11th
1991	Larrousse	LC91	Ford Cosworth DFR; V8	(Japan) Aguri Suzuki	6	Ret	Ret	Ret	Ret	Ret	Ret	Ret	Ret	Ret	DNQ	DNQ	Ret	DNQ	Ret	DNQ		2	11th
1991	Larrousse	LC91	Ford Cosworth DFR; V8	(Belgium) Bertrand Gachot																DNQ		2	11th
1993					RSA	BRA	EUR	SMR	ESP	MON	CAN	FRA	GBR	GER	HUN	BEL	ITA	POR	JPN	AUS		0	NC
1993	Scuderia Italia	T93/30	Ferrari Tipo 040; V12	(Italy) Michele Alboreto	Ret	11	11	DNQ	DNQ	Ret	DNQ	DNQ	DNQ	16	Ret	14	Ret	Ret				0	NC
1993	Scuderia Italia	T93/30	Ferrari Tipo 040; V12	(Italy) Luca Badoer	Ret	12	DNQ	7	Ret	DNQ	15	Ret	Ret	Ret	Ret	13	10	14				0	NC
1997					AUS	BRA	ARG	SMR	MON	ESP	CAN	FRA	GBR	GER	HUN	BEL	ITA	AUT	LUX	JPN	EUR	0	NC
1997	MasterCard Lola	T97/30	Ford ECA Zetec-R; V8	(Italy) Vincenzo Sospiri	DNQ	WD																0	NC
1997	MasterCard Lola	T97/30	Ford ECA Zetec-R; V8	(Brazil) Ricardo Rosset	DNQ	WD																0	NC

- Results published in 1991 FIA Yearbook of Automobile Sport credited the 1990 constructor results to "Larrousse" rather than "Lola".

=== Formula E results ===
Year	Chassis	Powertrain	Tyres	No.	Drivers	1	2	3	4	5	6	7	8	9	10	11	12	13	14	15	16	17	Points	T.C.
Lola Yamaha Abt Formula E Team
2024–25	Formula E Gen3 Evo	Lola-Yamaha T001	H			SAP	MEX	JED		MIA	MCO		TOK		SHA		JAK	BER		LDN			32	11th
2024–25	Formula E Gen3 Evo	Lola-Yamaha T001	H	11	(Brazil) Lucas di Grassi	Ret	20	DSQ	16	2	13	Ret	17	5	18	9	13	18	12	17	9		32	11th
2024–25	Formula E Gen3 Evo	Lola-Yamaha T001	H	22	(Barbados) Zane Maloney	12	15	16	18	19	21	14	16	14	19	11	18	16	Ret	Ret	16		32	11th
2025-26	Formula E Gen3 Evo	Lola-Yamaha T001	H			SAP	MEX	MIA	JED		MAD	BER		MCO		SAN	SHA		TOK		LDN		35	10th
2025-26	Formula E Gen3 Evo	Lola-Yamaha T001	H	11	(Brazil) Lucas di Grassi	Ret	13	13	16	15	12	17	16	8	9	10	17	1	11	11	Ret	Ret	35	10th
2025-26	Formula E Gen3 Evo	Lola-Yamaha T001	H	22	(Barbados) Zane Maloney	10	16	11	Ret	18	20	15	17	13	10	11	11	Ret	Ret	10	Ret	17	35	10th

== See also ==
- Reynard Motorsport
- Chevron Cars Ltd
- Swift Engineering
