= Thundersports Series =

- Category: Sportscar
- Country: United Kingdom
- Inaugural season: 1983
- Folded: 1989

The Thundersports Series was a domestic championship which took place in mainly at Brands Hatch ran circuits, for prototype sports cars and also featured cars that were eligible for Can-Am and Group C2 racing. To bring some real excitement, noise and spectacle back into British motor racing, after the demise of the British Formula One Championship, the BRSCC invented Thundersports. The new series had its debut on Easter Monday 1983 and the country's first major sport car race since the mid-1970s was a resounding success.

The series began in 1983, starting out as a seven race series, five of them being raced at either Brands Hatch, or one of the tracks they operated. By the end of series it remained at Brands Hatch only. Come 1989, the series was down to just nine cars for its final race. The BRDC C2 Championship was meant as a replacement for the dwindling Thundersports series, whilst the C2 Championship would serve to bring international sports car racing seen in the World Sportscar Championship to Britain.
