= Dijon-Prenois =

Motor racing circuit in France

Circuit de Dijon-Prenois

- Grand Prix Circuit (1976–present)
- Location: Prenois, Côte-d'Or
- Coordinates: 47°21′45″N 4°53′57″E
- FIA Grade: 2
- Broke ground: December 1969; 56 years ago
- Opened: 26 May 1972; 54 years ago
- Major events: Current: Classic Endurance Racing; Grand Prix de l'Âge d'Or (2005–2019, 2021–present); FFSA GT (1997–1998, 2000, 2002–2012, 2017–2018, 2023–present); TC France Series (2023–present); Porsche Carrera Cup France (1987–1989, 1993–1999, 2002–2004, 2006–2009, 2011, 2017–2018, 2024–present); French F4 (2018, 2024–present); Alpine Elf Cup (2018, 2023, 2026); Future: GT3 Revival Series (2027); Former: Formula One; French Grand Prix (1974, 1977, 1979, 1981, 1984); Swiss Grand Prix (1982); GT2 European Series (2023); DTM (2009); NASCAR Whelen Euro Series (2009–2010, 2013); FIA GT (1998, 2006); FIA Sportscar Championship (2002); World Sportscar Championship (1973, 1975–1976, 1978–1980, 1989–1990)

Grand Prix Circuit (1976–present)
- Length: 3.801 km (2.362 mi)
- Turns: 12
- Race lap record: 1:02.985 ( (Austria) Ingo Gerstl, Toro Rosso STR1, 2015, F1)

Short Circuit (1972–present)
- Length: 3.289 km (2.044 mi)
- Turns: 8
- Race lap record: 1:00.000 ( (South Africa) Jody Scheckter, Tyrrell 007, 1974, F1)

Dijon-Prenois is a 3.801 km (2.362 mi) motor racing circuit located in Prenois, near Dijon, France. The undulating track is noted for its fast, sweeping bends.

Opened in 1972, Dijon-Prenois hosted the Formula One French Grand Prix five times, and the Swiss Grand Prix in 1982. The non-championship 1975 Swiss Grand Prix was also held at Dijon. The circuit currently hosts the Grand Prix de l'Age d'Or, and FFSA GT Championship.

== History ==
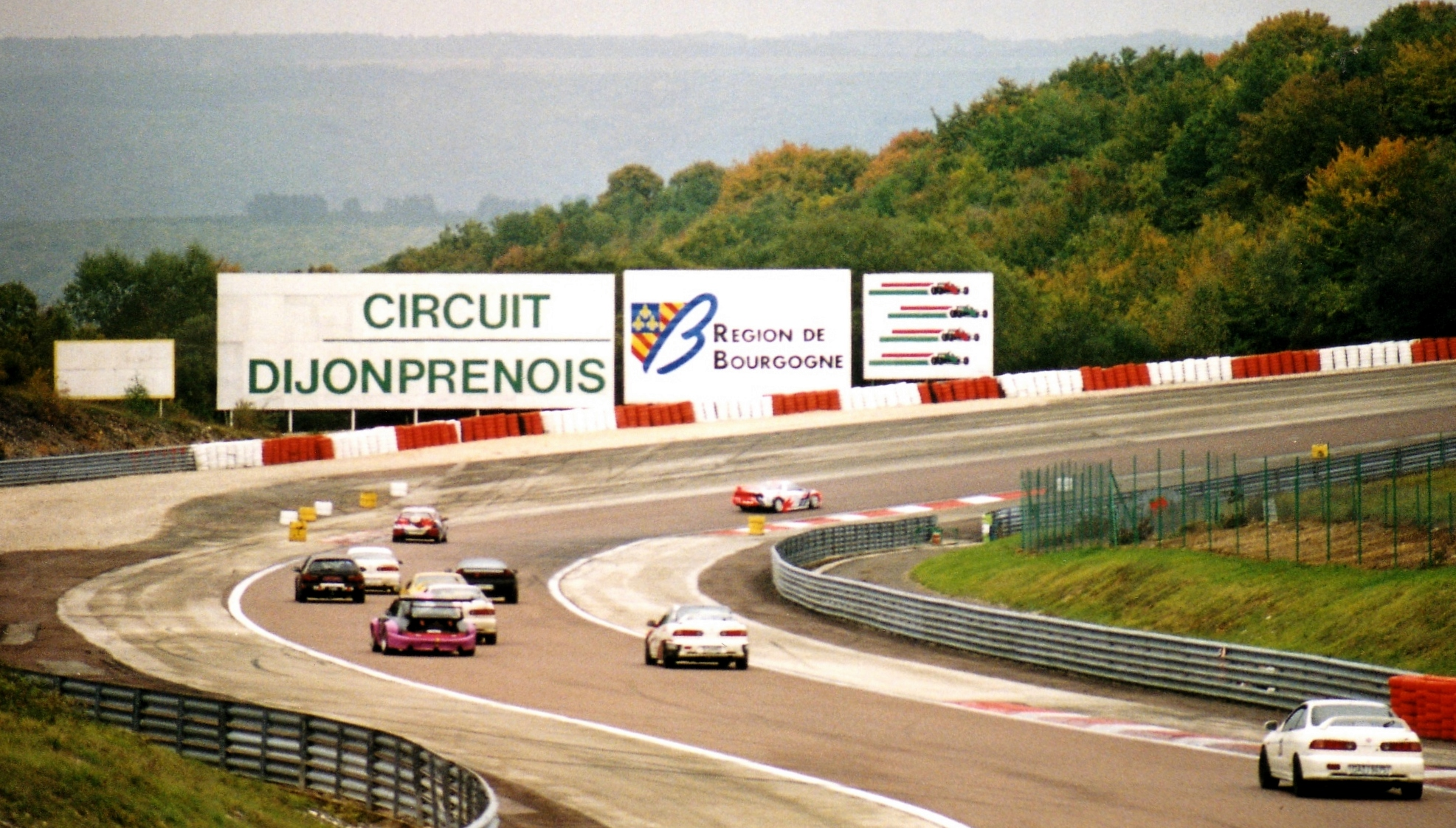
Part of the added section of Dijon-Prenois with the Parabolique corner

Planned in 1967, work commenced in December 1969. The track was part of a plan to make Dijon an automotive centre. It was the brainchild of rugby-player and wrestler François Chambelland (sometimes assumed to be the masked wrestler l'Ange Blanc), and was developed with the aid of racers Jean-Pierre Beltoise and François Cevert, as well as motoring journalist José Rosinski. In spite of lack of support from the city government and a chronic lack of funds, the track was declared open on 26 May 1972, with Guy Ligier making the first timed lap around the circuit. The first race, for 2-litre prototypes, was held ten days later. Arturo Merzario was the inaugural winner.

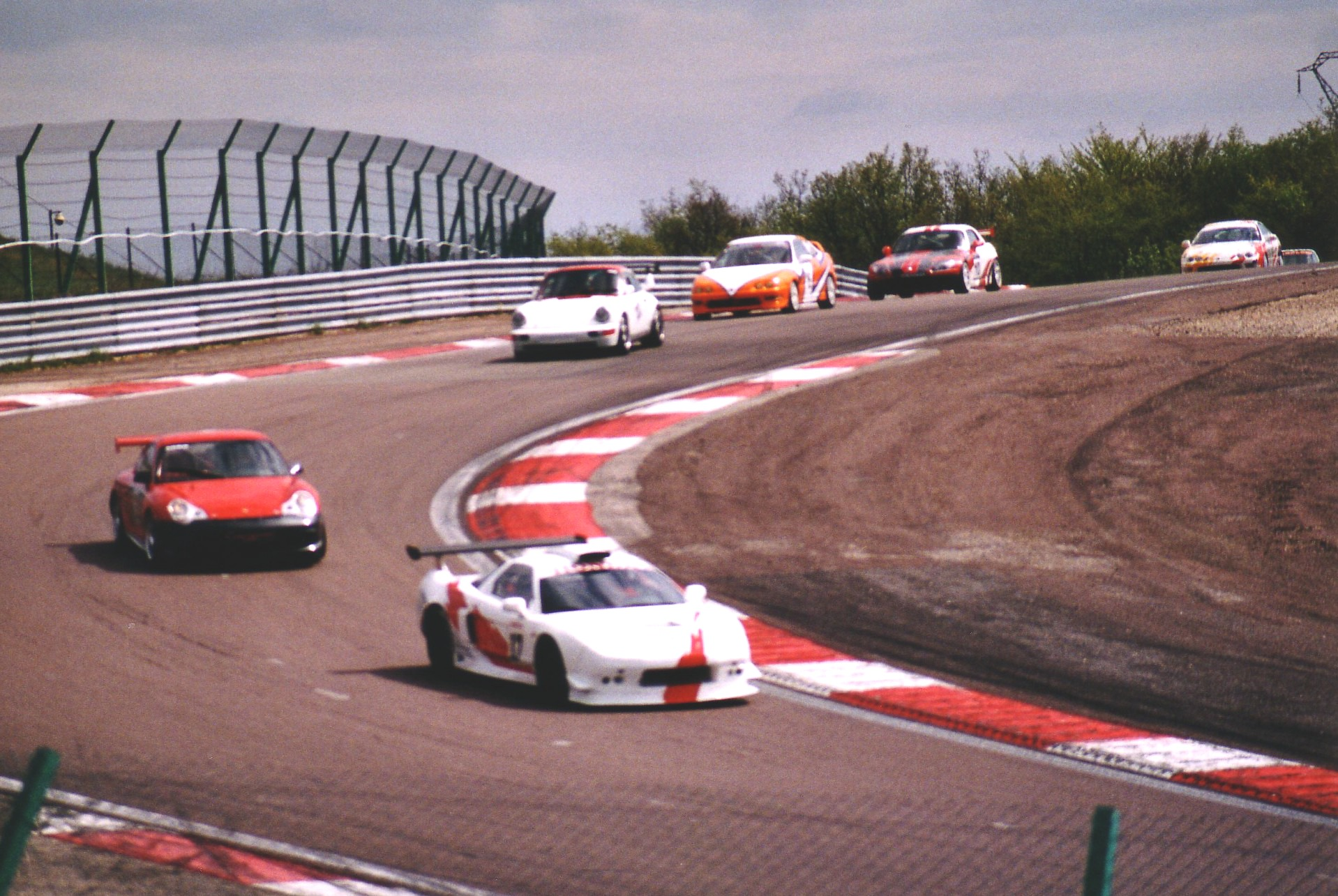
Warm-up lap of the European Honda Trophy race, Gauche de la bretelle corner (2004)

The first F1 race was run in 1974 on the circuit's original 3.289 km (2.044 mi) layout; with the fastest lap times under the one-minute mark, there was a major problem with congested traffic between the race leaders and the back-markers. Therefore, in 1976 an extension was added to lengthen the circuit as well as to reprofile many of its corners before the time F1 could return to Dijon in 1977. The 1979 French Grand Prix featured a memorable battle for second place in the final laps between Gilles Villeneuve's Ferrari and René Arnoux's Renault, which was finally won by Villeneuve. The race itself was won by Jean-Pierre Jabouille in the other Renault - Renault's first, and the first F1 victory for a turbocharged car.

The 1982 Formula One season was not to see the French Grand Prix held at Dijon as that race was held at the Paul Ricard Circuit, located at Le Castellet in southern France. Instead, Dijon held the (as yet) last Swiss Grand Prix, despite being located in France and not Switzerland. This was due to the Swiss Government's ban on motor racing in the wake of the 1955 24 Hours of Le Mans disaster in which 83 people, many of whom were spectators, and the driver Pierre Levegh, died when a car crashed at high speed and vaulted into the pit straight grandstand. 1982 Formula One World Champion Keke Rosberg, driving his Williams FW08, won his first ever Grand Prix in the 1982 Swiss race, four seconds in front of local favourite Alain Prost driving a factory backed Renault RE30B.

The French Grand Prix alternated between Paul Ricard and Dijon, until the last F1 race at Dijon took place in 1984. The race was won by McLaren's Niki Lauda, who won his 3rd and final World Championship that year. The fastest lap of the race was set by Lauda's teammate Alain Prost (1:05.257) at an average speed of 214 km/h (133 mph). Fittingly, the last F1 pole at Dijon was set by a French driver driving a French car, with Patrick Tambay recording a 1:02.200 in his factory Renault RE50 turbo. Tambay led the race for the first 47 laps before being passed by Lauda, the Frenchman eventually finishing 2nd, seven seconds behind the McLaren MP4/2.

Long-distance racing continued, with a race in the FIA GT Championship held there in 1998 for instance. Although Formula One has not returned to Dijon since 1984, the circuit continues to be used today for minor, mostly local races. These include club level events and motorcycle racing, and truck racing events have been held there since 1988. The track was renovated in 2001, when a go-cart track was added.

== Events ==
Current

- April: Fun Cup France, Historic Tour Dijon
- May: FFSA GT Championship, Porsche Carrera Cup France, French F4 Championship, Alpine Elf Cup, TC France Series
- June: Classic Endurance Racing Grand Prix de l'Âge d'Or
- September: Dijon Motors Cup

Former

- Belgian Touring Car Series (2007-2011)
- BMW M1 Procar Championship (1979)
- BOSS GP (2009–2010, 2012, 2015)
- BPR Global GT Series (1994)
- Deutsche Tourenwagen Masters (2009)
- Euro Formula 3000 (2002, 2004)
- European Touring Car Championship (1988)
- European Truck Racing Championship (1996–2001)
- FIA European Formula 3 Championship (1978)
- FIA GT Championship (1998, 2006)
- FIA Sportscar Championship (2002)
- Formula 3 Euro Series (2009)
- Formula 750 (1977)
- Formula One
  - French Grand Prix (1974, 1977, 1979, 1981, 1984)
  - Swiss Grand Prix (1982)
- Formula Palmer Audi (2006)
- French Formula Three Championship (1978–1985, 1987–1999, 2002)
- French Formula Renault Championship (1976–1981, 1984–1985, 1991–1994, 2002–2009)
- French Supertouring Championship (1976–1987, 1989–1999, 2002–2005)
- GT2 European Series (2023)
- International Formula 3000 (1985, 1988–1989)
- NASCAR Whelen Euro Series (2009–2010, 2013)
- Ultimate Cup Series (2019–2021)
- World Sportscar Championship (1973, 1975–1976, 1978–1980, 1989–1990)
- World Touring Car Championship (1987)

== Lap records ==
The outright unofficial all-time track record for the full Grand Prix Circuit is 1:01.380, set by Alain Prost in a Renault RE30B, during first qualifying for the 1982 Swiss Grand Prix. The outright unofficial all-time track record for the Short Circuit is 0:58.790 seconds, set by Niki Lauda in a Ferrari 312B3, during qualifying for the 1974 French Grand Prix. As of May 2026, the fastest official race lap records at the Circuit de Dijon-Prenois are listed as:

Category	Time	Driver	Vehicle	Event	Circuit Map
Grand Prix Circuit (1976–present): 3.801 km (2.362 mi)
BOSS GP/F1	1:02.985	Ingo Gerstl	Toro Rosso STR1	2015 BOSS GP Dijon Motors Cup	
Group C	1:08.973	Jean-Louis Schlesser	Mercedes-Benz C11	1990 480 km of Dijon	
F3000	1:10.430	Érik Comas	Lola T89/50	1989 Dijon F3000 round	
GT1 (Prototype)	1:10.861	Bernd Schneider	Mercedes-Benz CLK LM	1998 FIA GT Dijon 500km	
Formula Three	1:11.067	Jules Bianchi	Dallara F308	2009 Dijon F3 Euro Series round	
Sports prototype	1:11.527	Charlie Robertson	Ginetta G57 P2	2017 Dijon 4 Hours	
LMP900	1:11.614	Jan Lammers	Dome S101	2002 FIA Sportscar Championship Dijon	
DTM	1:11.644	Paul di Resta	AMG-Mercedes C-Klasse 2009	2009 Dijon DTM round	
LMP3	1:11.951	Alessandro Ghiretti	Ligier JS P3	2020 Dijon Ultimate Cup round	
GT1 (GTS)	1:15.119	Jaroslav Janiš	Saleen S7-R	2006 FIA GT Dijon 500km	
Group C2	1:15.324	Fermín Vélez	Spice SE89C	1989 480 km of Dijon	
IMSA GTP	1:15.327	David Kennedy	Mazda 767B	1989 480 km of Dijon	
Formula Two	1:15.523	Richard Evans	March 742	2017 Dijon Motors Cup	
Formula Renault 2.0	1:15.844	Daniel Ricciardo	Tatuus FR2000	2008 Dijon Formula Renault 2.0 West European Cup round	
LMP675	1:15.956	Fabio Mancini	Lucchini SR2001	2002 FIA Sportscar Championship Dijon	
Formula 4	1:16.658	Alexandre Munoz	Mygale M21-F4	2025 Dijon French F4 round	
GT3	1:16.672	Emmanuel Collard	Mercedes-AMG GT3	2021 Dijon Ultimate Cup round	
Porsche Carrera Cup	1:17.285	Marvin Klein	Porsche 911 (992 II) Cup	2026 Dijon Porsche Carrera Cup France round	
Group 6	1:17.400	Arturo Merzario	Alfa Romeo T33SC/12	1977 Dijon 500 km	
Sports 2000	1:18.050	Doug Hart	March 75S	2011 Martini Trophy	
GT2 (GTS)	1:18.390	Olivier Beretta	Chrysler Viper GTS-R	1998 FIA GT Dijon 500km	
Formula Palmer Audi	1:18.450	Jon Barnes	Formula Palmer Audi car	2006 Dijon Formula Palmer Audi round	
SRO GT2	1:18.575	Pierre Kaffer	Audi R8 LMS GT2	2023 Dijon GT2 European Series round	
Sports prototype	1:18.631	Martin O'Connell	Chevron B19	2011 Martini Trophy	
GT2	1:20.189	Jaime Melo	Ferrari F430 GTC	2006 FIA GT Dijon 500km	
Group 5	1:21.160	Edgar Dören	Porsche 935 K3	1980 Dijon 1000 km	
TCR Touring Car	1:21.473	Raphaël Fournier	Hyundai Elantra N TCR	2026 Dijon TC France round	
GT4	1:22.231	Léo Jousset	Alpine A110 GT4+	2026 Dijon FFSA GT round	
FIA GT Group 2	1:22.666	Bas Leinders	Gillet Vertigo Streiff	2006 FIA GT Dijon 500km	
GT1	1:23.240	Jean-Claude Basso	Venturi 600 LM	1996 2 Hours of Dijon	
Silhouette racing car	1:23.515	Vincent Radermecker	SEAT Toledo Silhouette	2002 Dijon French Supertouring round	
Stock car racing	1:23.958	Ander Vilariño	Chevrolet SS NASCAR	2013 Dijon NASCAR Whelen Euro Series round	
Alpine Elf Cup	1:24.121	Gosia Rdest	Alpine A110 Cup	2026 Dijon Alpine Elf Cup round	
Group A	1:27.400	Klaus Niedzwiedz	Ford Sierra RS500 Cosworth	1988 Dijon ETCC round	
Renault Clio Cup	1:30.551	Nicolas Milan	Renault Clio R.S. IV	2018 Dijon Renault Clio Cup France round	
Short Circuit (1972–present): 3.289 km (2.044 mi)
Formula One	1:00.000	Jody Scheckter	Tyrrell 007	1974 French Grand Prix	
Group 5 sports prototype	1:00.600	François Cevert	Matra-Simca MS670	1973 Dijon 1000 km	
Group 6	1:01.180	Jochen Mass	Porsche 936	1976 Dijon 500 km	
Sports 2000	1:02.600	Arturo Merzario	Abarth-Osella 2000 Sport SE-021	1972 Dijon European 2-Litre Sports Car Championship round	
Group 5 special production	1:06.840	Jacky Ickx	Porsche 935	1976 6 Hours of Dijon	
Group 4	1:17.100	Gérard Larrousse	Porsche 911 Carrera RSR	1974 Dijon GT race	
Formula Three	1:18.650	Pierre Petit	Ralt RT3	1982 Dijon French F3 round	
