= Lola T380 =

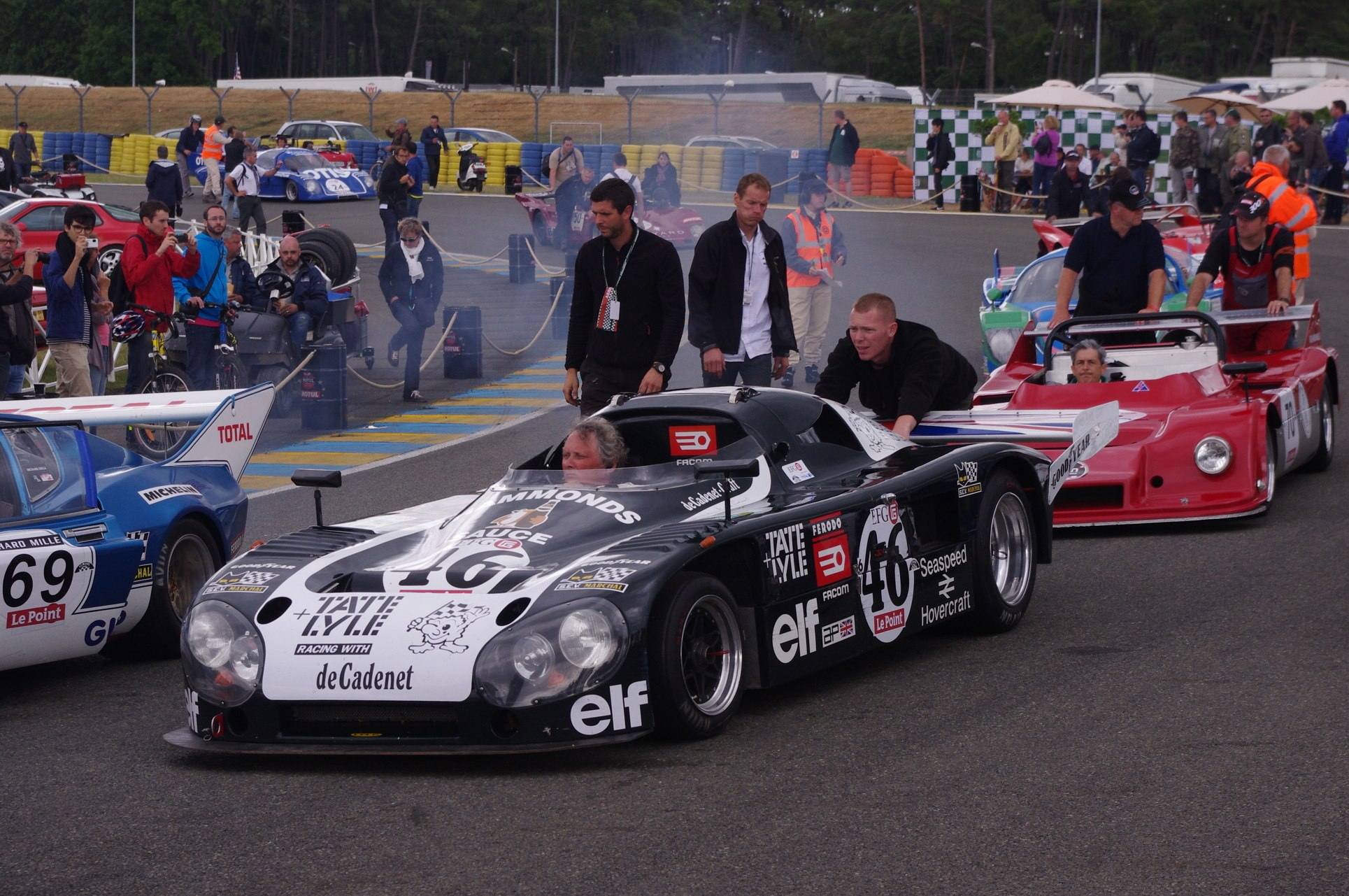
- Category: Group 5
- Constructor: Lola
- Predecessor: Lola T290
- Successor: Lola T390

Technical specifications
- Chassis: Fiberglass bodywork, aluminum monocoque
- Suspension (front): Double wishbones, coil springs over shock absorbers, anti-roll bar
- Suspension (rear): Reversed lower wishbones, top links, single trailing arms, anti-roll bar
- Engine: Ford-Cosworth DFV 3.0 L (183.1 cu in) V8 naturally-aspirated Mid-engined
- Transmission: Hewland DG 300 5-speed manual
- Power: 398 hp (297 kW) @ 9500 rpm
- Weight: 715 kg (1,576 lb)

Competition history
- Debut: 1975 24 Hours of Daytona

The Lola T380 is a 3-litre Group 5 sports prototype, designed, developed and built by British manufacturer and constructor Lola, for sports car racing, in 1975.

Two were made. One was for Alain de Cadenet; the second was for International Race Services, an Italian team (HU2).
