= Mitsubishi Colt F2000 =

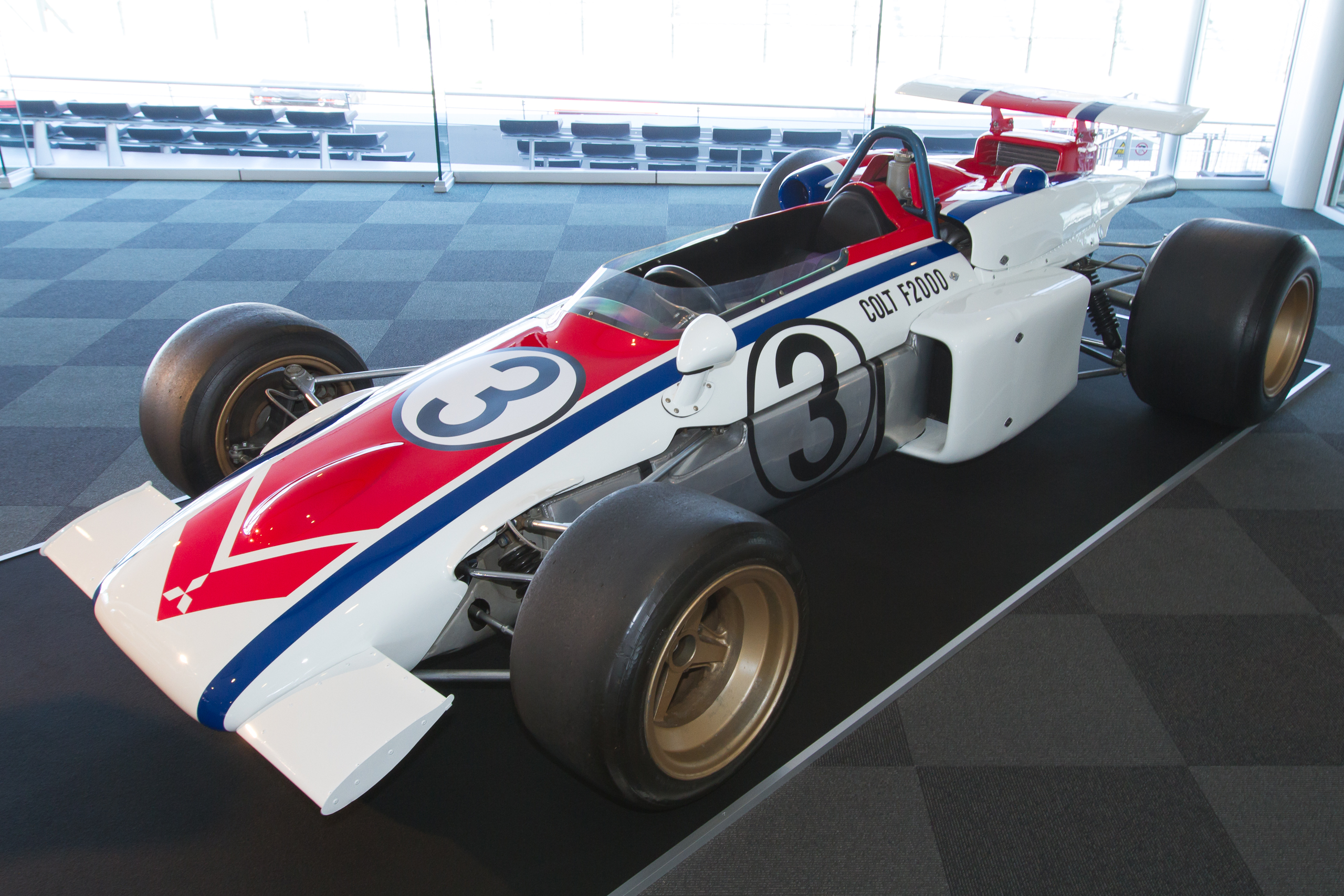
- Category: F2000
- Constructor: Mitsubishi

Technical specifications
- Chassis: Glass-fiber reinforced plastic panels bodywork, steel tubular space frame
- Suspension (front): Double wishbones, coil springs over shock absorbers, anti-roll bar
- Suspension (rear): Reversed lower wishbones, top links, twin trailing arms, coil springs over shock absorbers, anti-roll bar
- Engine: Mitsubishi R39B 2.0 L (122.0 cu in) DOHC I4 naturally-aspirated Mid-engined
- Transmission: Hewland 5-speed manual
- Power: 280–290 hp (210–220 kW)
- Weight: 470 kg (1,036 lb)

Competition history
- Debut: 1971 Japanese Grand Prix

The Mitsubishi Colt F2000 was an open-wheel formula race car, designed, developed and built by Japanese manufacturer Mitsubishi Motors, for the Japanese Formula 2000 championship, in 1971.

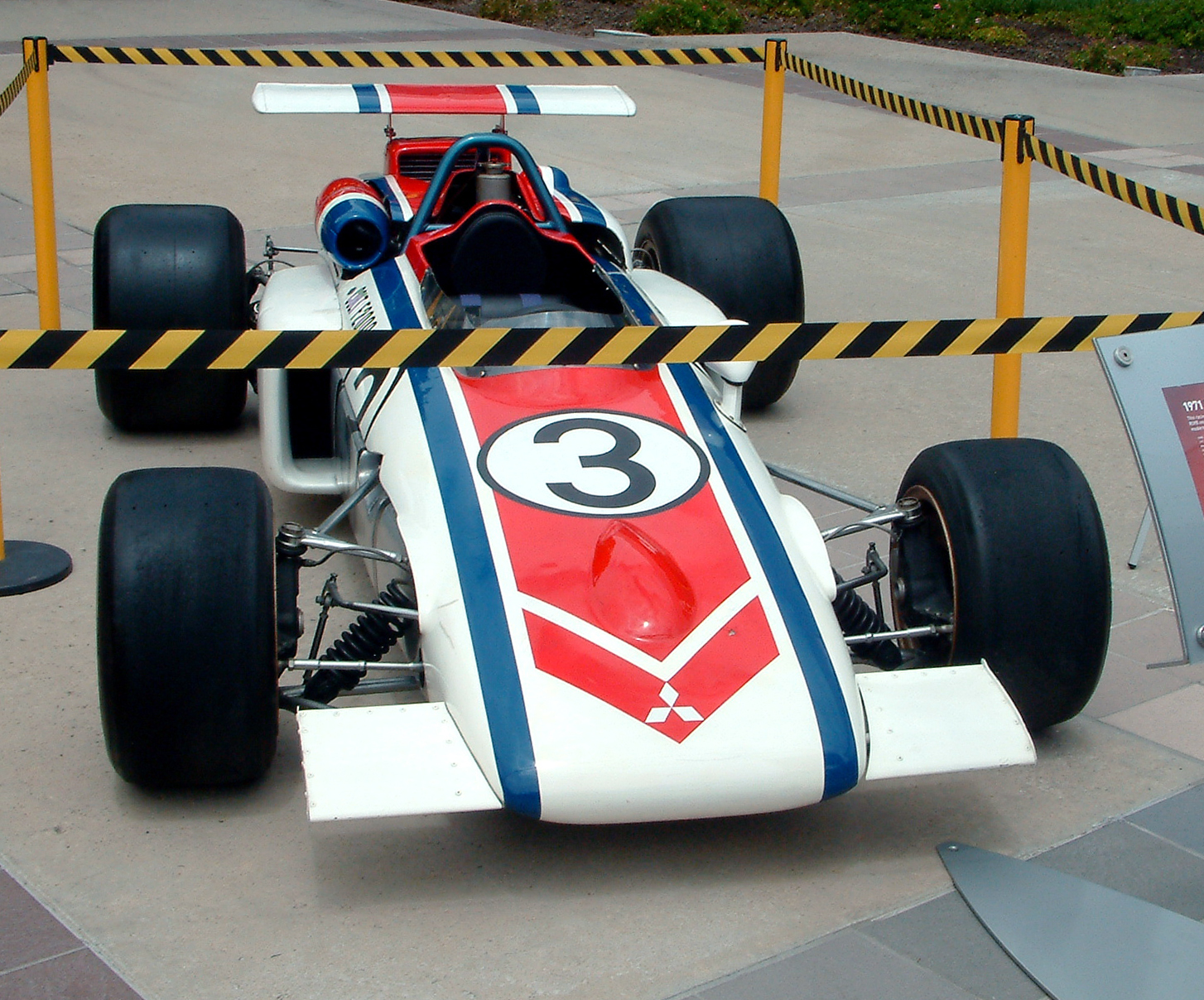
Front

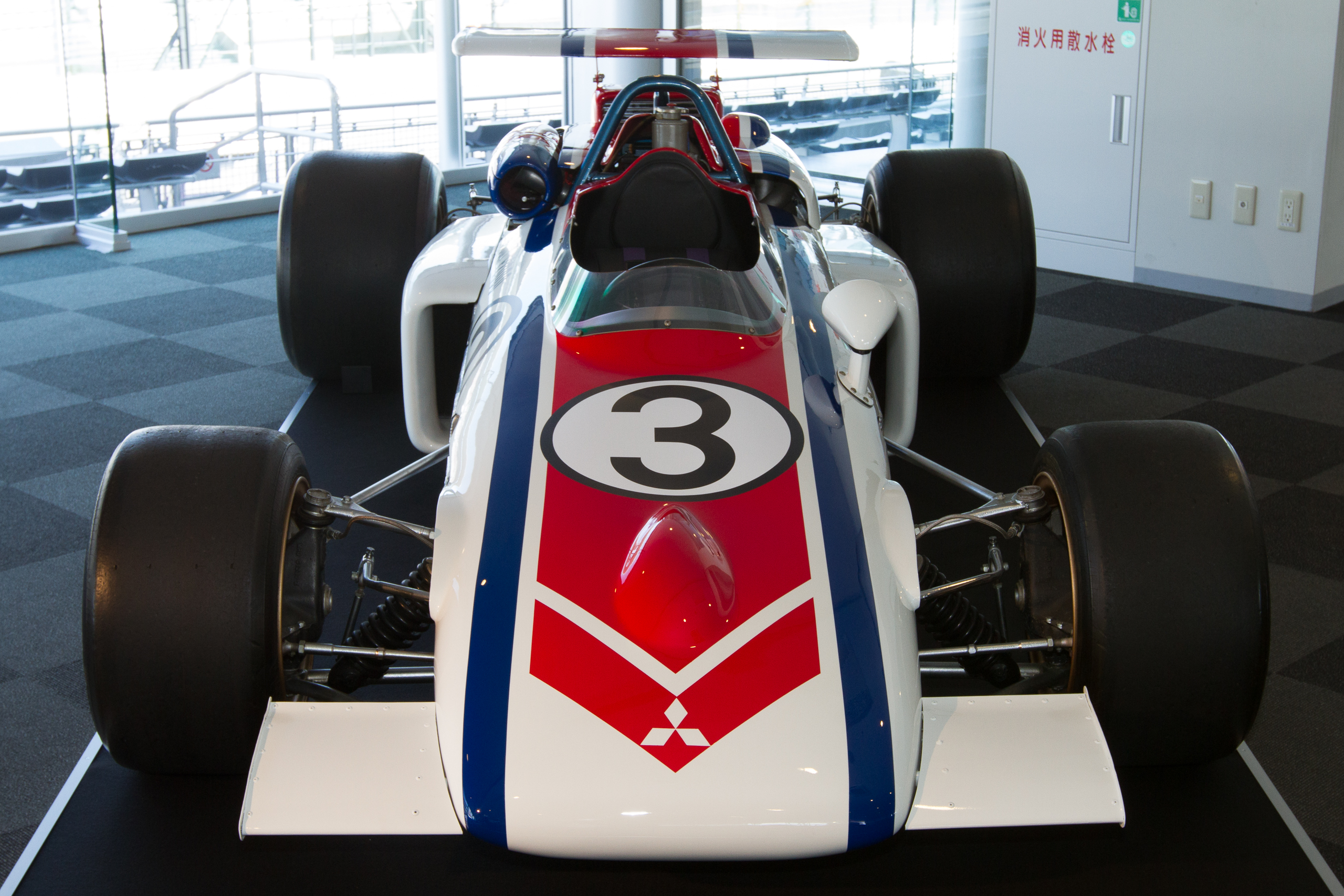
On exhibition at the Suzuka Circuit
