= Abarth-Osella PA1 =

Prototype racing car

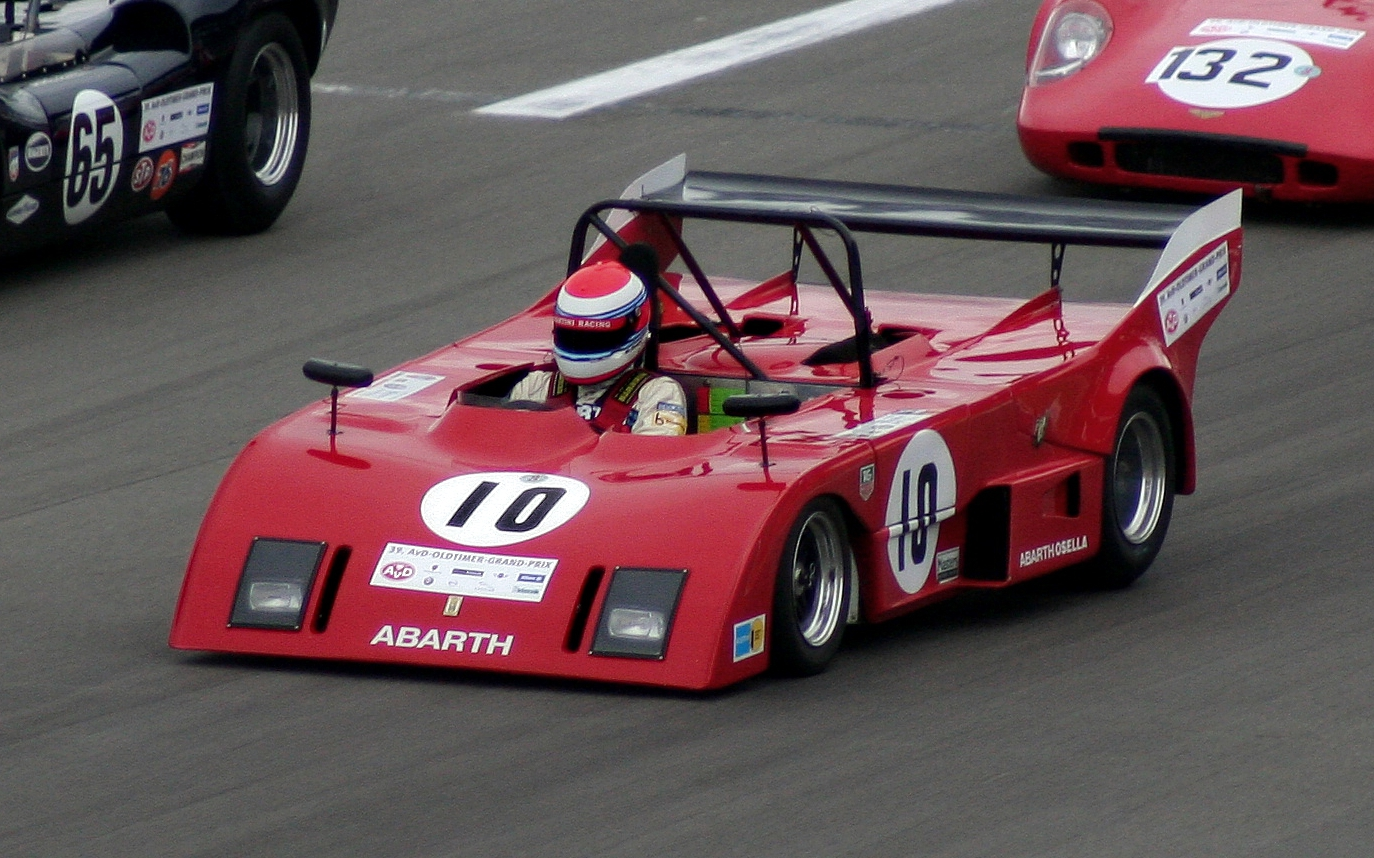
- Category: Group 5 (Sports 2000) prototype
- Designer(s): Abarth-Osella
- Production: 1973

Technical specifications
- Chassis: Fiberglass aluminium monocoque with steel tubular rear subframe
- Suspension (front): Double wishbones, Coil springs over Dampers, Anti-roll bar
- Suspension (rear): Single top links, twin lower links, Twin Radius arms, Coil springs over Dampers, Anti-roll bar
- Axle track: 1,304 mm (51.3 in) (front); 1,410 mm (55.5 in)
- Wheelbase: 2,090 mm (82.3 in)
- Engine: Abarth 4 cylinder inline, 1981 cc
- Transmission: Hewland F.G.400 5-speed manual, rear wheel drive
- Weight: 575 kg (1,268 lb)

Competition history
Entries	Wins	Podiums	Poles
68	5	17	2

The Abarth-Osella PA1 is a 2-liter Group 5 (Sports 2000) prototype racing car built by Osella in collaboration with Abarth, to compete in the World Sportscar Championship sports car racing series in 1973, but was used in active competition through 1982.

== Background ==
Osella had taken over the Abarth material and the two-liter boats lined up in the 1972 European Sport. In 1973 the car was evolved, taking on a new name.

== Construction ==
The car was named PA-1 (Alberto-1 Prototype) in honor of the engineer Alberto Guerrato, who died that year.

The car had a frame made of square steel tubes with glued and riveted aluminium paneling. At the rear, a round tube frame supported the engine, gearbox, and suspension, an upright served as a support for the upper suspension arms, while the lower ones were bolted to a plate under the gearbox. The suspension was equipped with a torsion bar on both axles, the Hewland F.G.400 gearbox flanked the rear brakes. The engine was the two-liter 4-cylinder Abarth type E, twin-shaft, four valves per cylinder, and Lucas injection, 270 hp at 8,700 rpm increased to 285 in the G version. Originally the PA1 had two small rear wings, placed at the edge of the bodywork which was immediately replaced by a single wing to obtain greater aerodynamic load. The Abarth-Osella PA1 was built in 10 units.

The first tests on the track were carried out by Enzo Osella himself, in 1973, on a cold and wet January afternoon at the Morano Po racetrack, then the PA1 was tested by Arturo Merzario at Misano but the tests were disturbed by bad weather. Later the car was tested in Vallelunga, always with Merzario together with Nanni Galli. However, in an accident, Galli damaged the car (and himself). Further tests were carried out in Fiorano and the last tuning, in Vallelunga, led Merzario to obtain very promising times. The 2000 European sports championship began at the Paul Ricard circuit on April 8, 1973, and the season ended after eight tests with the 400 km of Barcelona, on the Montjuich circuit. At the wheel of the Abarth-Osella PA1 in 1973, in addition to Arturo Merzario, also Vittorio Brambilla, Nanni Galli, Dieter Quester, Giorgio Pianta, Jean-Claude Andruet, Henri Pescarolo, Derek Bell, Franco Pilone, Juan Fernandez, Pino Pica, Francisco Torredemer and Christian Melville who took the Abarth team to third place, behind Lola and Chevron. Only two victories were obtained in 1973. Vittorio Brambilla won the “Enna City Cup” in Pergusa on August 15 and Arturo Merzario won the Nürburgring 500 km on September 2. The European championship was won by the Crowne Racing Lola T292 piloted by Chris Craft. Vittorio Brambilla won the "Enna City Cup" in Pergusa on August 15 and Arturo Merzario won the 500 km of the Nürburgring on September second. The European championship was won by the Crowne Racing Lola T292 piloted by Chris Craft. Vittorio Brambilla won the "Enna City Cup" in Pergusa on August 15 and Arturo Merzario won the 500 km of the Nürburgring on September 2. The European championship was won by the Crowne Racing Lola T292 piloted by Chris Craft.

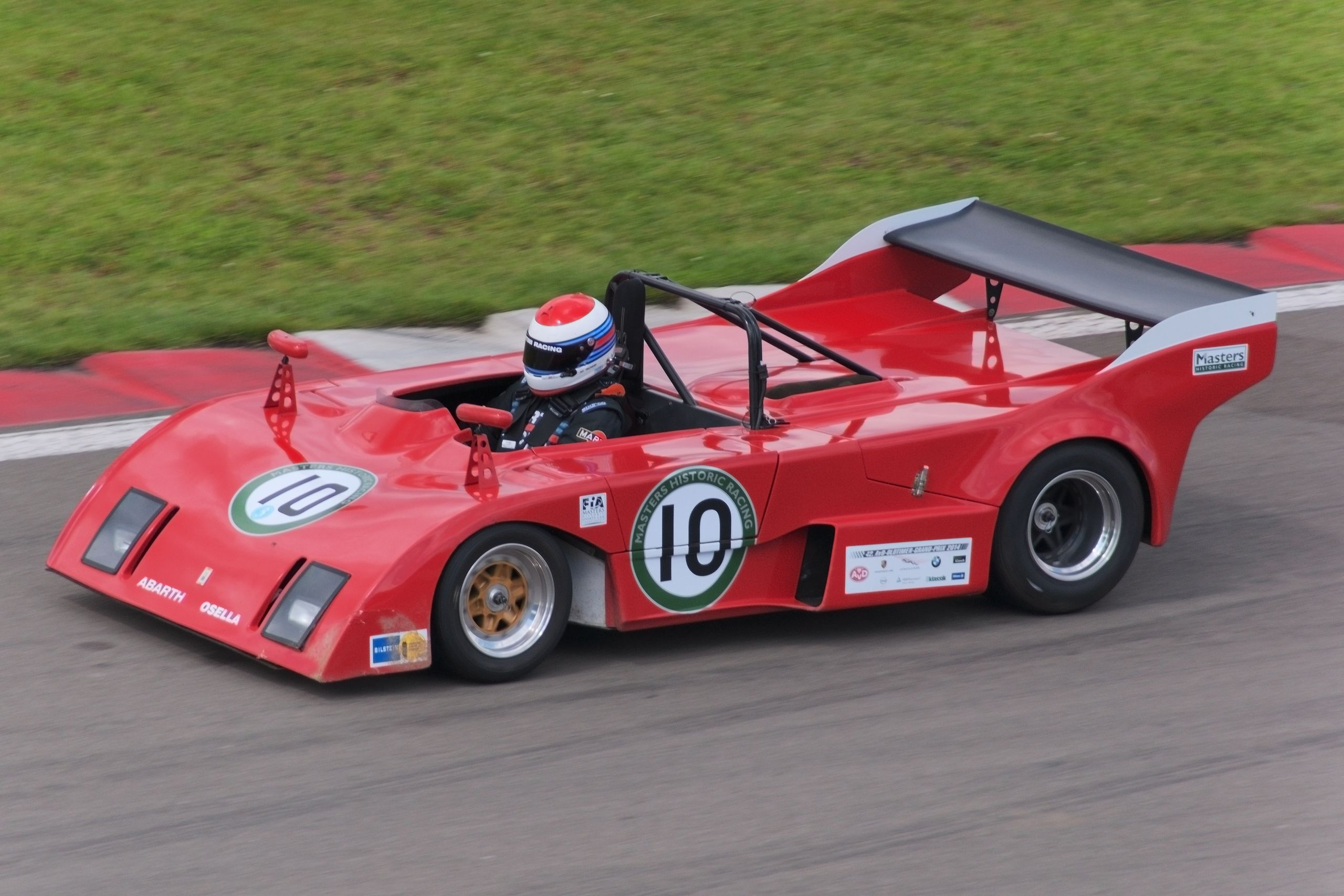

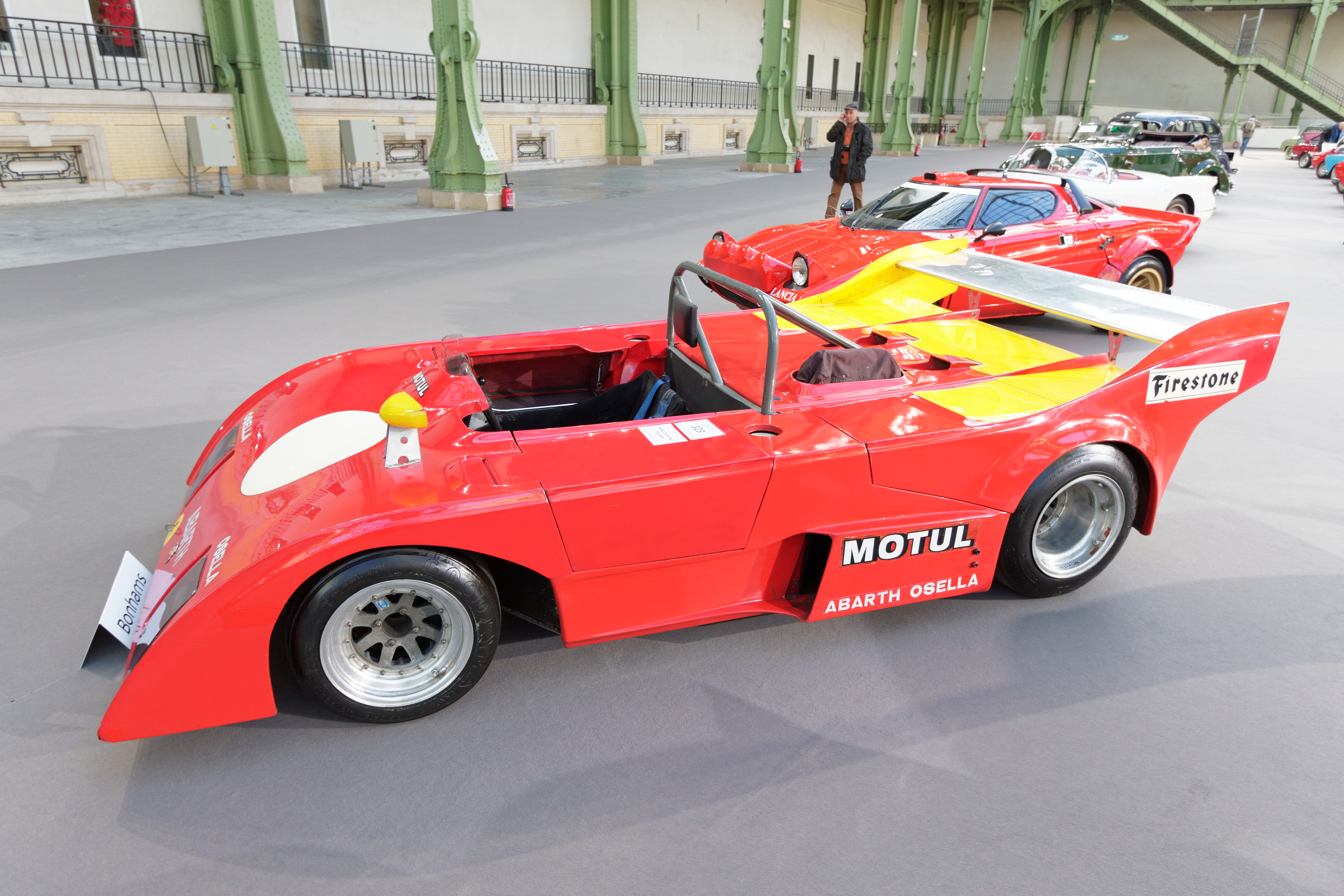

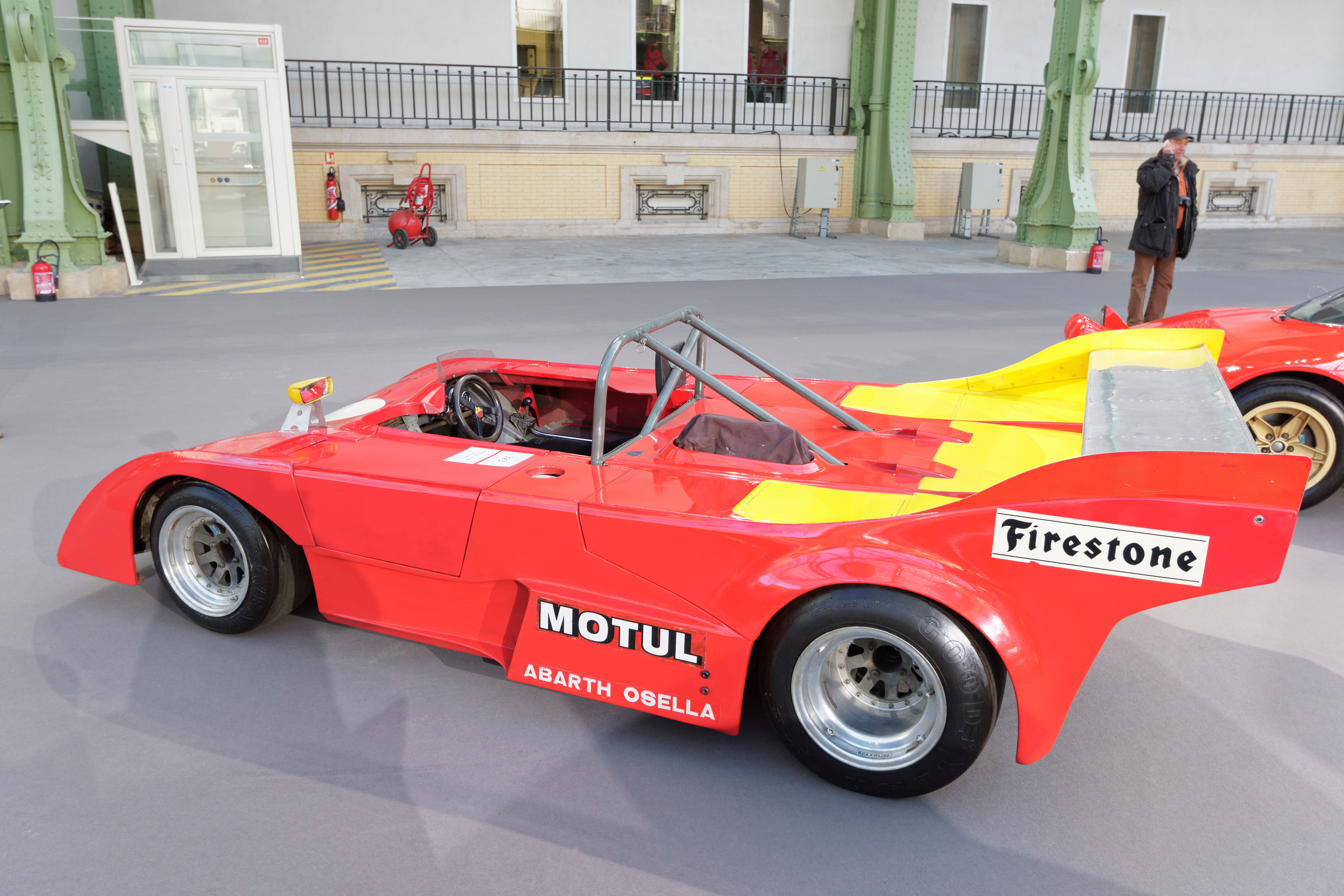

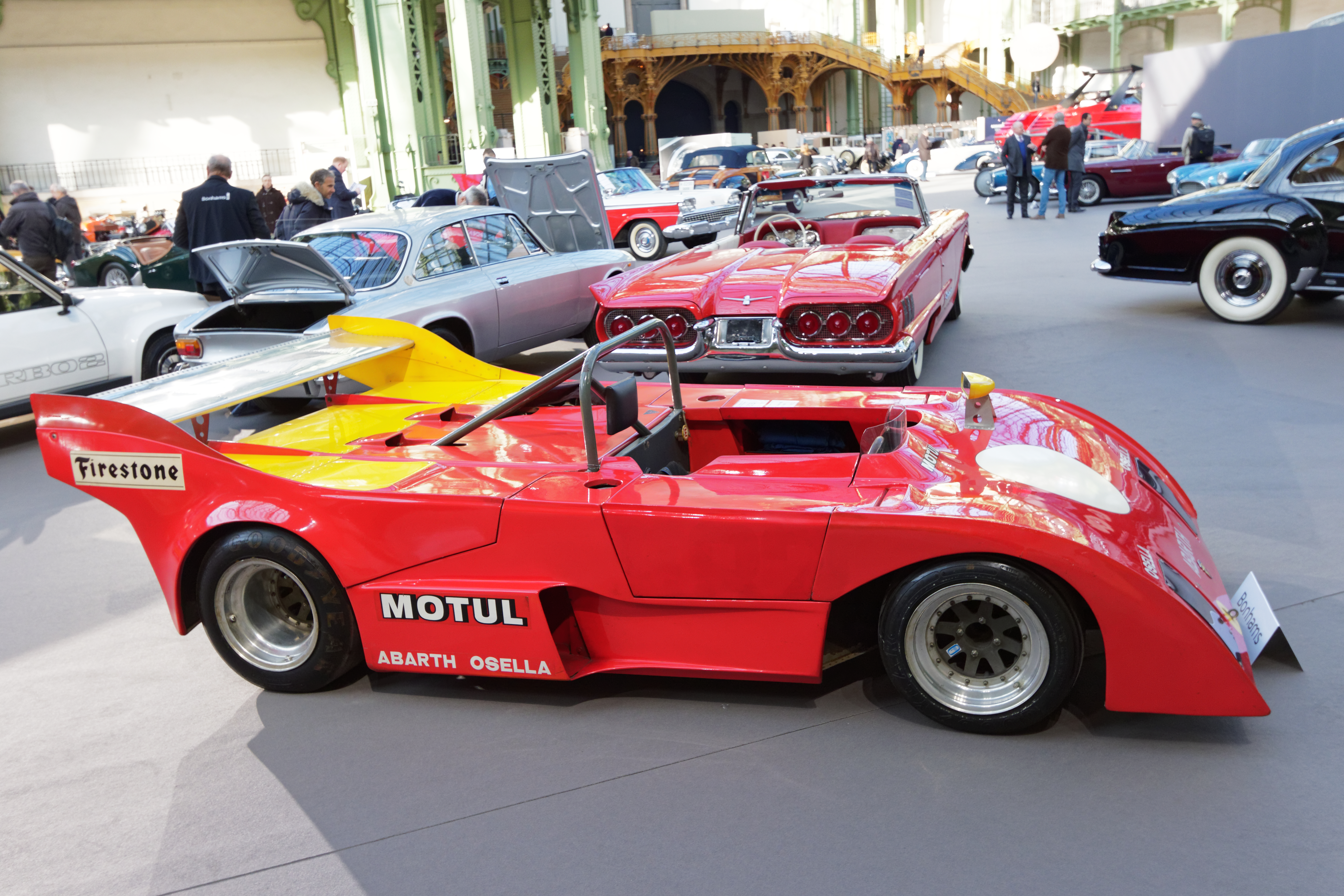

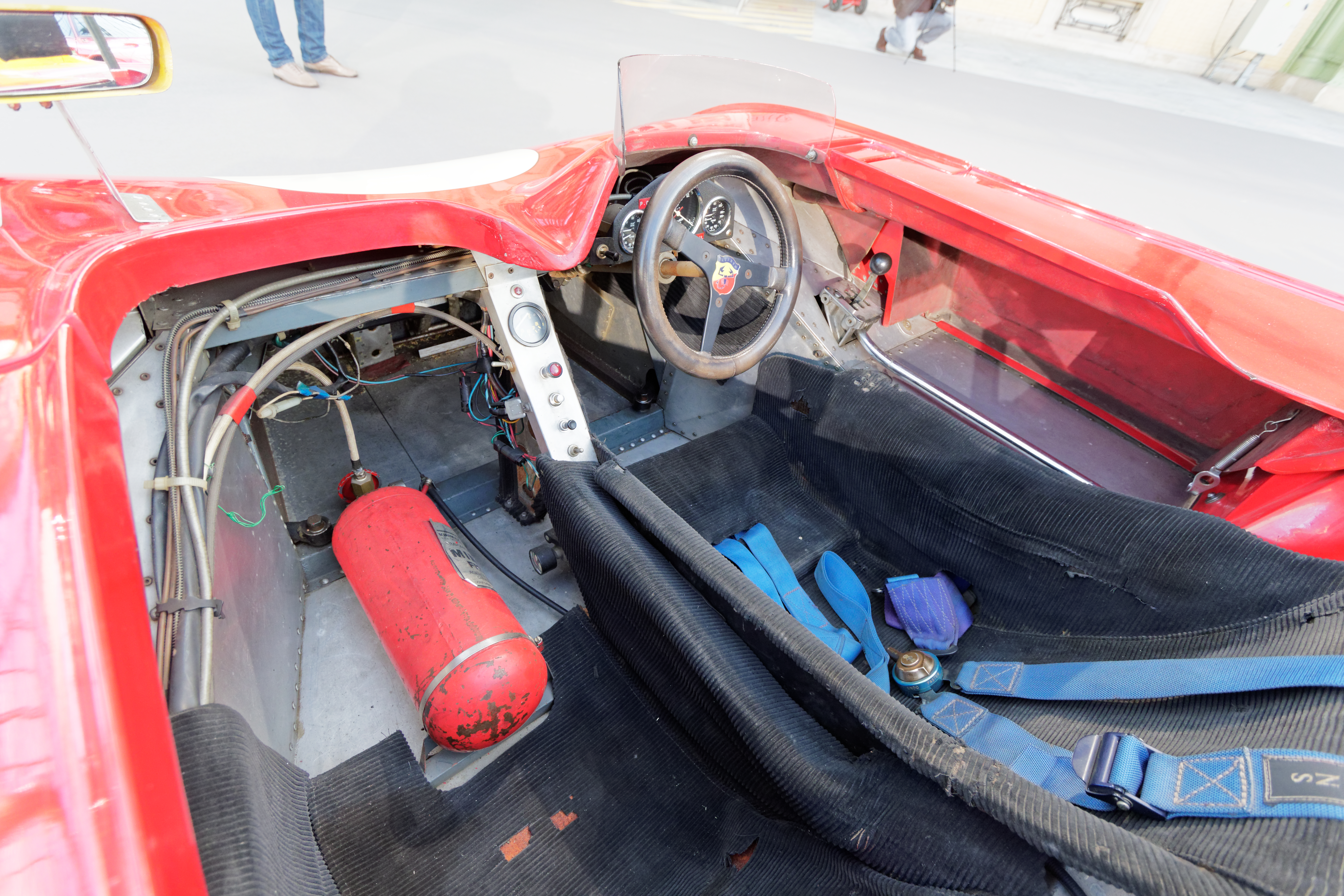

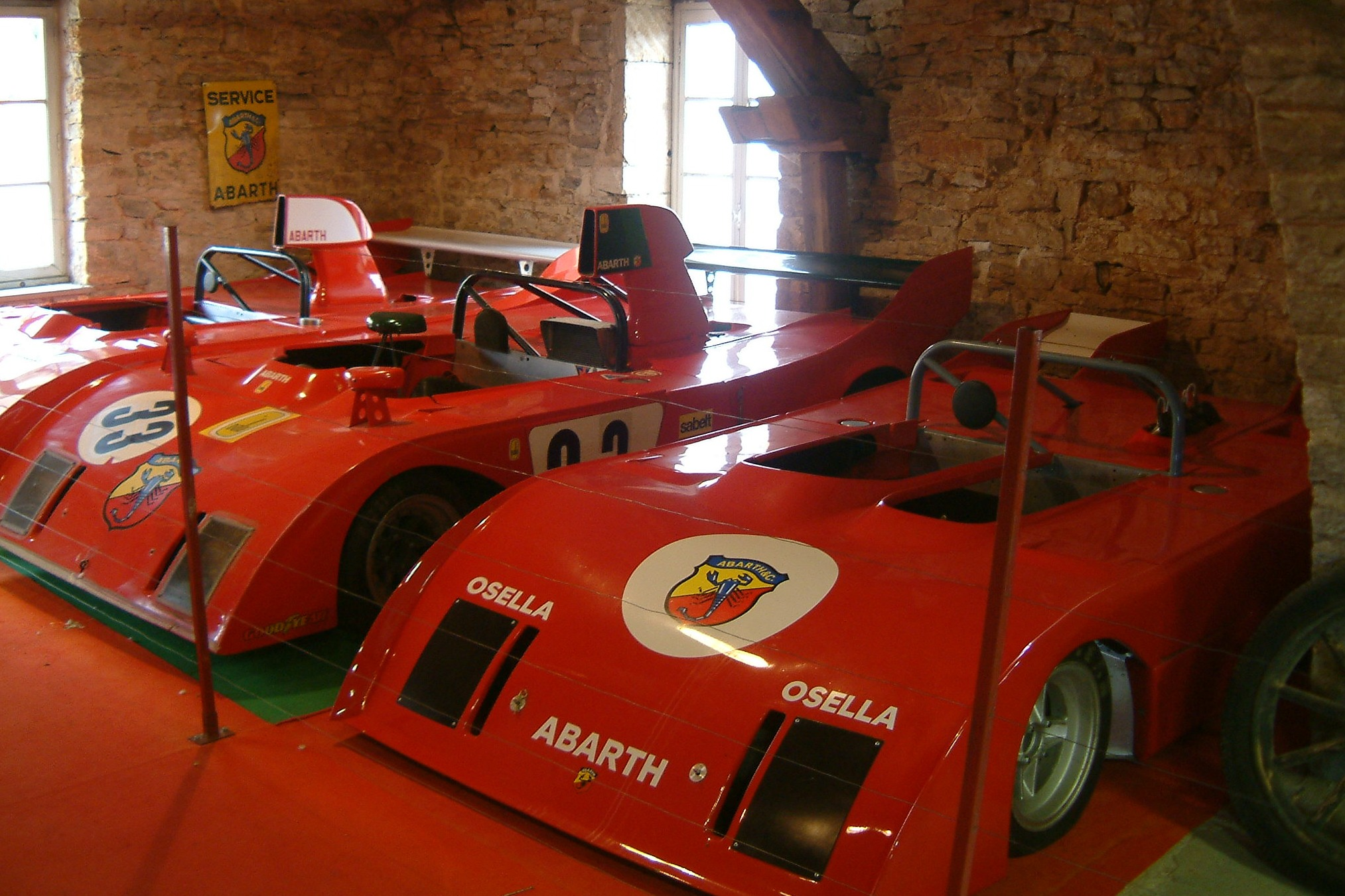

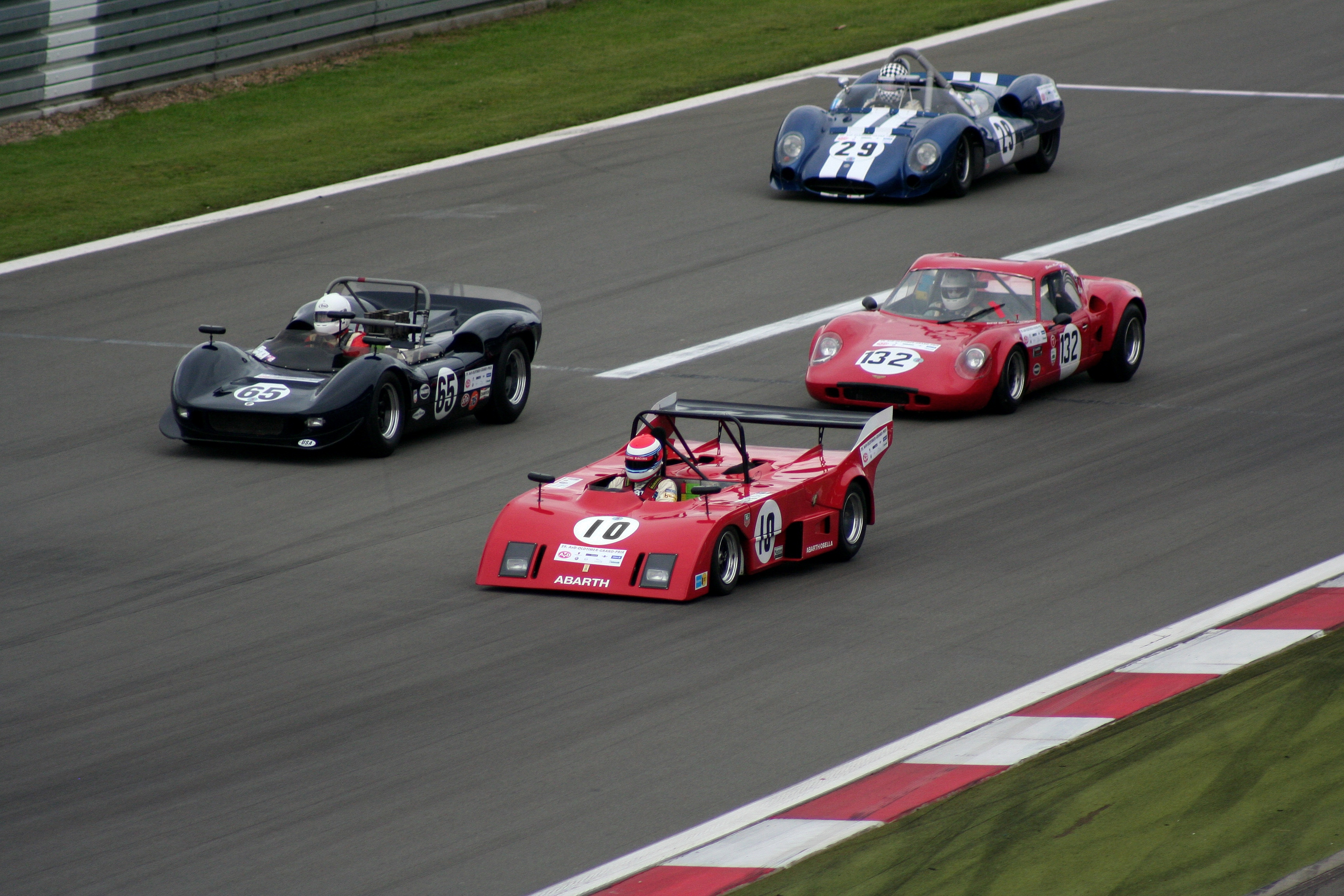
