= Mitsubishi R39B engine =

Racing engine

Mitsubishi R39B

Overview
- Manufacturer: Mitsubishi
- Production: 1971

Layout
- Configuration: Inline-4
- Displacement: 1,994 cc (2.0 L; 121.7 cu in)
- Cylinder bore: 86 mm (3.4 in)
- Piston stroke: 86 mm (3.4 in)
- Cylinder block material: Cast iron
- Valvetrain: 4-valve valves per cylinder, hydraulic valve lifters, belt-driven double overhead camshaft (DOHC)

Combustion
- Fuel system: Fuel injection
- Fuel type: Gasoline
- Cooling system: Water-cooled

Output
- Power output: 280–290 hp (209–216 kW)

The Mitsubishi R39B is a 2.0 L (120 cu in), four-stroke, DOHC, naturally-aspirated, four-cylinder racing engine, designed, developed, and built by Mitsubishi, for the Japanese Formula 2000 championship, in 1971. It is itself based on the Saturn engine.

== Applications ==
- Mitsubishi Colt F2000
- Lola T290
