= Lola T290 =

Sports prototype race car

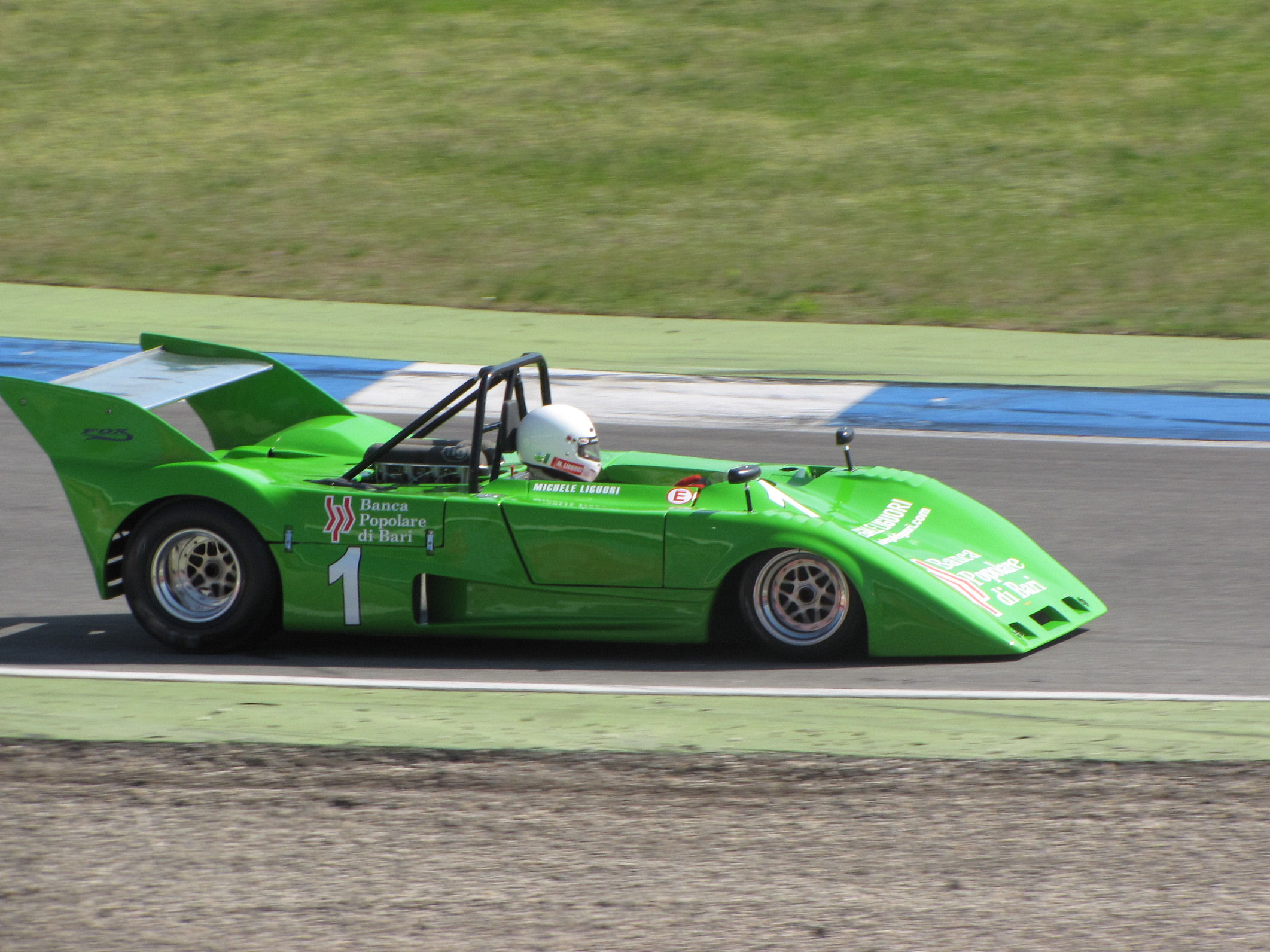
- Category: Group 5 (later Group 6)
- Constructor: Lola
- Designer(s): Bob Marston; Eric Broadley; John Barnard; Patrick Head
- Predecessor: Lola T280
- Successor: Lola T380

Technical specifications
- Chassis: Glass-fiber reinforced plastic panels bodywork, aluminum monocoque (later with rear subframe)
- Suspension (front): Double wishbones, coil springs over shock absorbers, anti-roll bar
- Suspension (rear): Reversed lower wishbones, top links, twin trailing arms, coil springs over shock absorbers, anti-roll bar
- Axle track: 1,395 mm (54.9 in) (Front); 1,395 mm (54.9 in) (Rear)
- Wheelbase: 2,330 mm (91.7 in)
- Engine: Ford-Cosworth BDG; Ford-Cosworth FVC; Ford-Cosworth DFV in T296; Mitsubishi R39B; BMW M12/7; Hart 420R engine Cosworth EA 2.0 L (122.0 cu in) I4 naturally-aspirated Mid-engined
- Transmission: Hewland 5-speed manual
- Power: 255–300 hp (190–224 kW)
- Weight: 575–610 kg (1,268–1,345 lb)

Competition history
- Debut: 1972 300 km of Fuji
- Constructors' Championships: 1: 1973 European 2-Litre Sportscar Championship
- Drivers' Championships: 1: Chris Craft (1973)

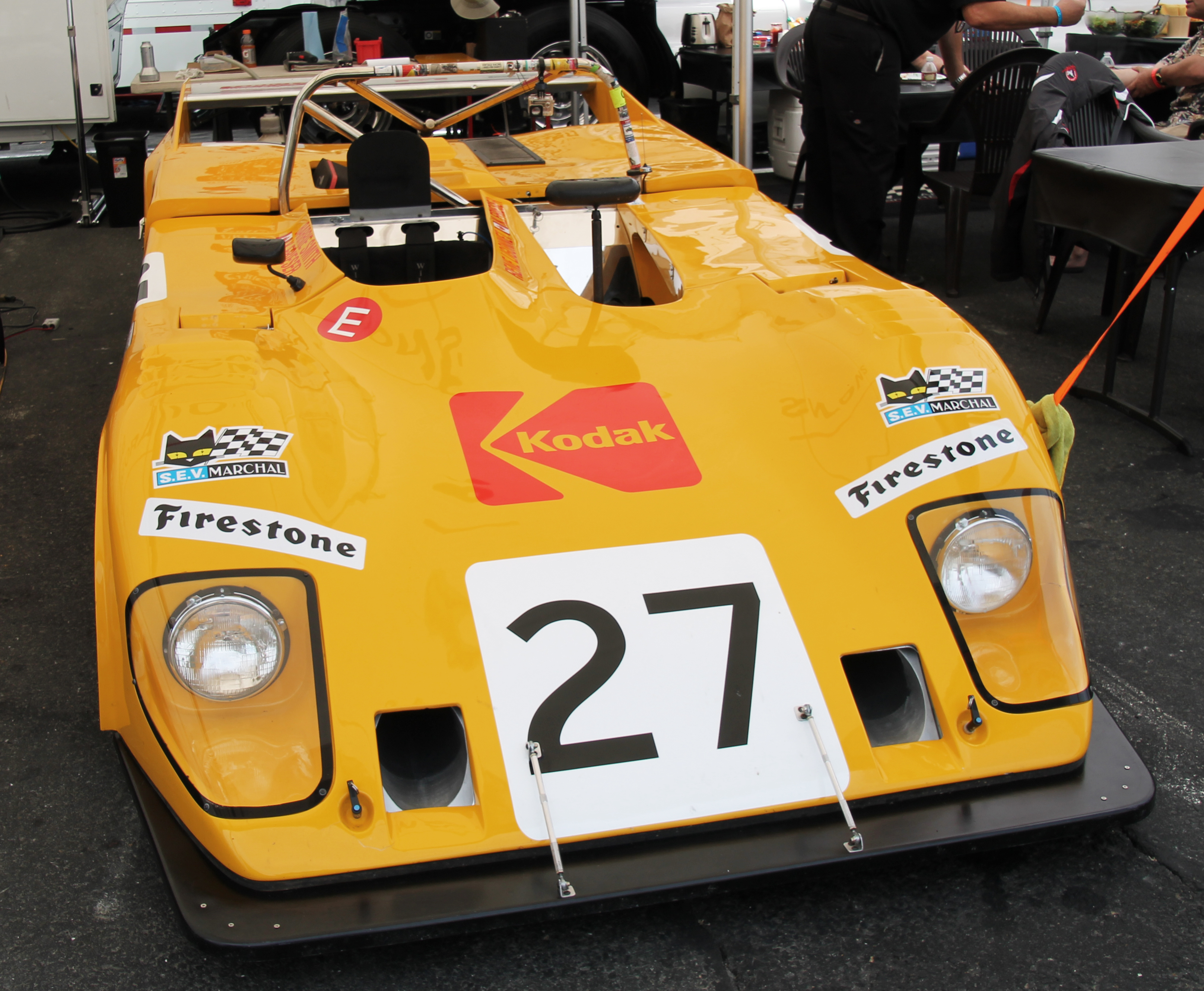
Lola T290

The Lola T290, and its evolutions, the T292, T294, T296, T297, T298, and T299, are a series of Group 5 (and later Group 6) Sports 2000 prototype race cars, designed and developed by Bob Marston, John Barnard, Patrick Head, and Eric Broadley, and built by British manufacturer and constructor Lola, for European 2-Litre Championship sports car racing series, between 1972 and 1981.

== Background ==
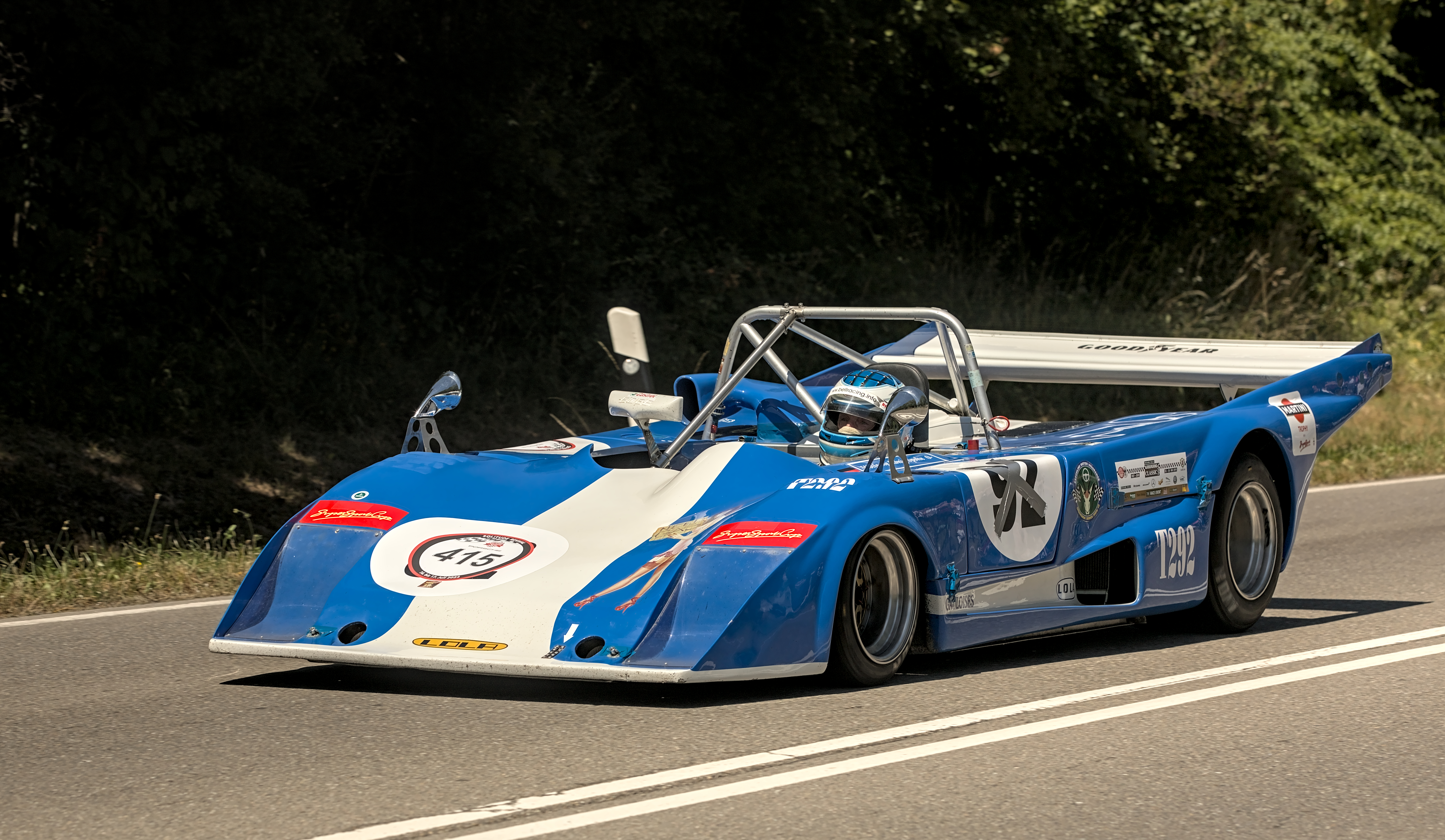
Lola T292

A new regulatory change that would come into force for the 1972 season put Lola back in a position to offer its customers a car with which to face the competition serenely. In fact, Group 6 (which included prototype cars from 1968, with an engine limited to three liters of displacement) was merged with Group 5, which from 1968 included the "Sport Cars" produced in at least 25 units, and so there was a new Group 5 which included the "Prototypes of Sports Cars" (official name: Prototype-Sports Cars) with an engine capacity limit of 3,000 cm^{3}, minimum weight increased to 650 kg and no minimum number of specimens. This decision was also dictated by the intent to slow down the cars, given the performance of the best sports cars in the 1970-71 two-year period, in particular, the Porsche 917 and the Ferrari 512S and 512M. The new sports-prototype cars, which were often old Group 6 adapted to the new regulations, participated in the newborn World Makes Championship using engines derived from those of Formula 1, such as the Ford Cosworth DFV which allowed the cars driven by it to compete well and was available for private stables.

== Design ==
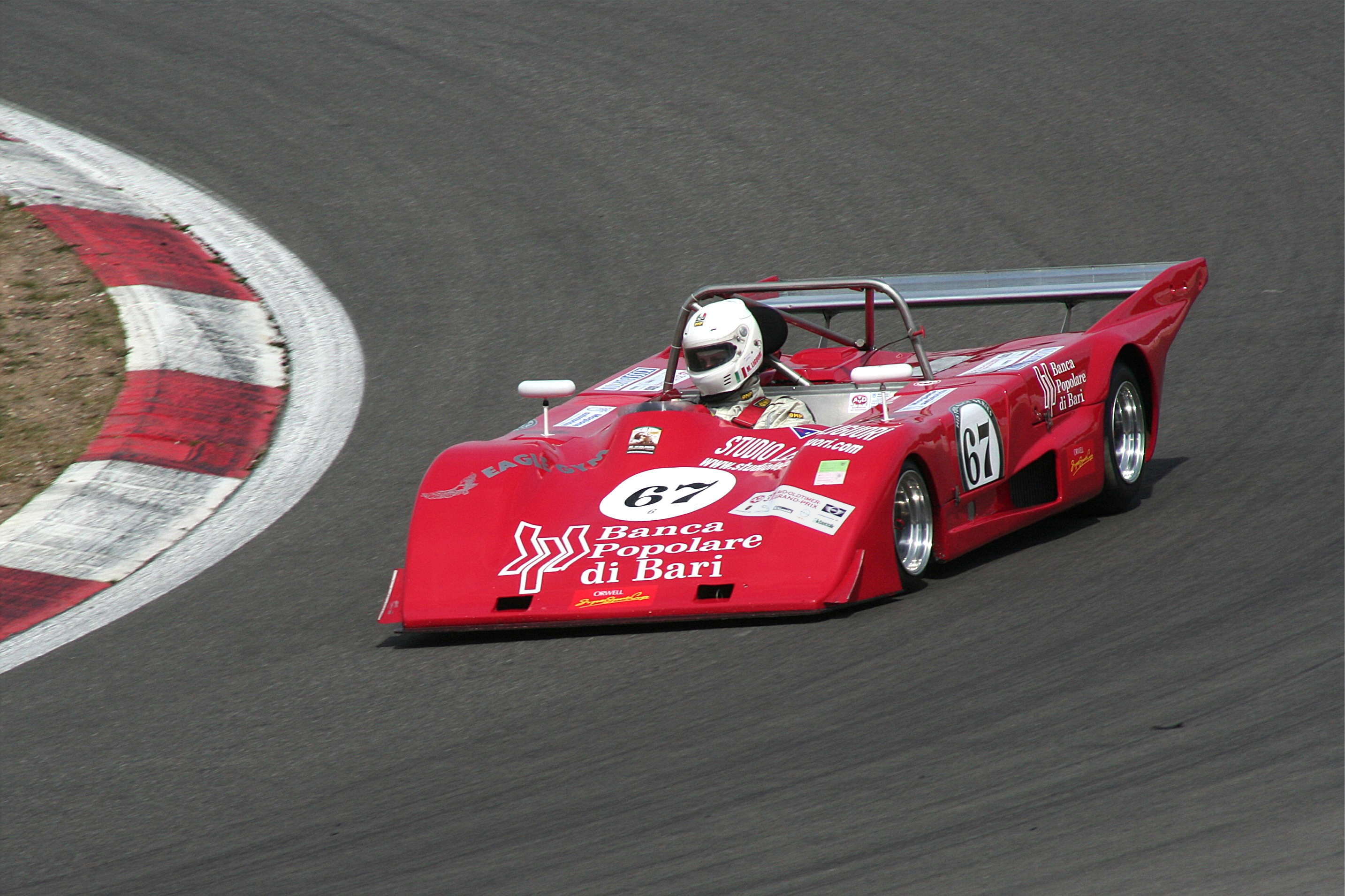
Lola T296

Lola boss Eric Broadley understood that the market would demand a simple car to match the DFV and therefore designed the two cars (named T280 for the three-liter class and T290 for the two-liter) together with chief designer Bob Marston, with the help of the then in their twenties Patrick Head and John Barnard, around a monocoque frame in aluminum alloy, a technology already used for the T210 and its derivative T212, around which a highly profiled fiberglass bodywork was modeled.

== Variants ==
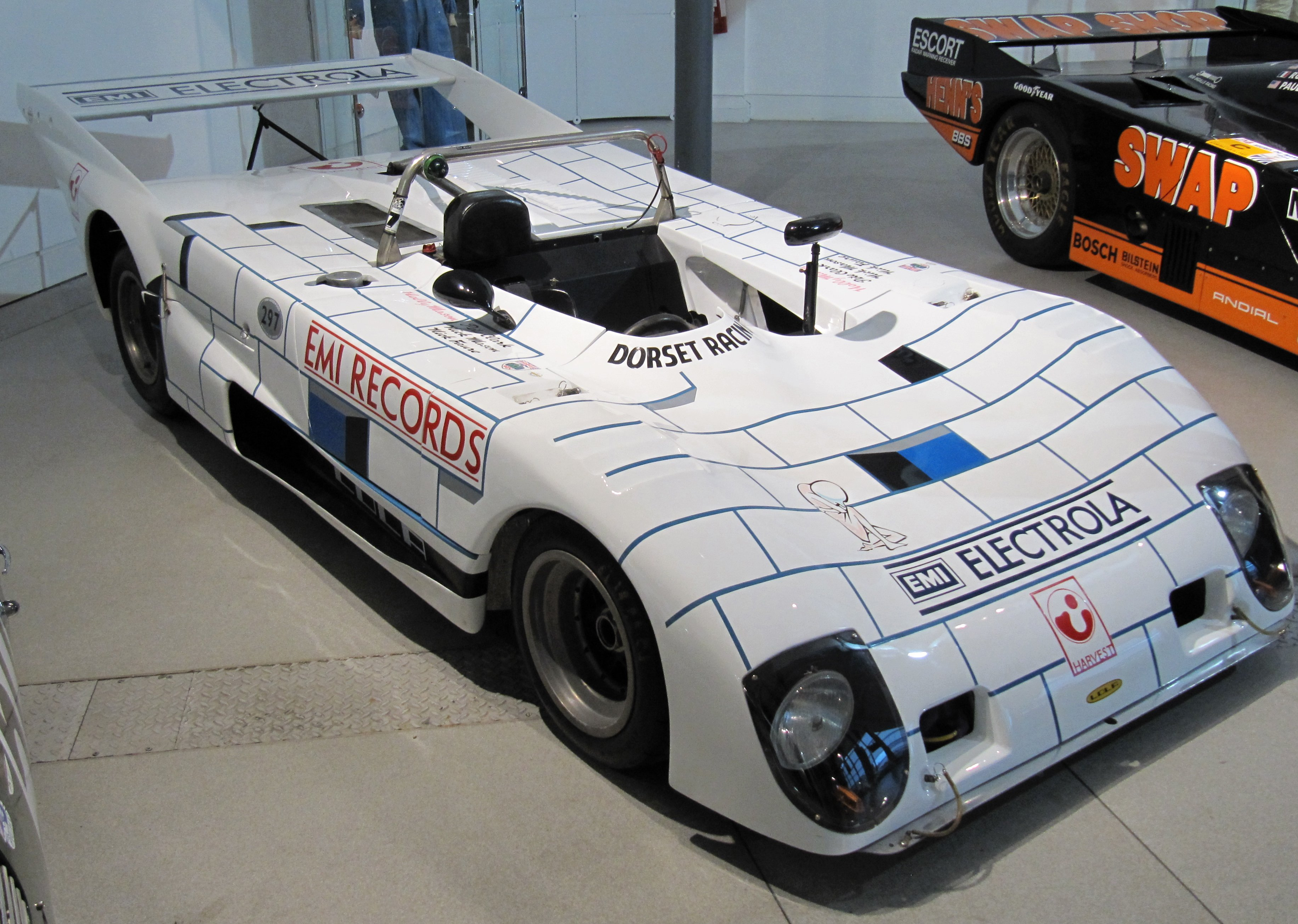
Lola T297

The T292 stood as an improved version of the previous T290: the aluminum monocoque frame remained practically unchanged compared to the previous versions. The only appreciable diversification at a mechanical level was the relocation of the disc brakes at the differential output rather than on the wheel hubs, in such a way as to reduce unsprung masses and consequently increase the maneuverability of the car. To improve aerodynamics, the front of the car was lengthened, while a fixed wing was placed at the rear. Although the project was mainly intended for the two-liter class and could accommodate several four-cylinder in-line engines, one example of the car was equipped with the three-liter Ford Cosworth DFV V8 engine, with 445 hp.

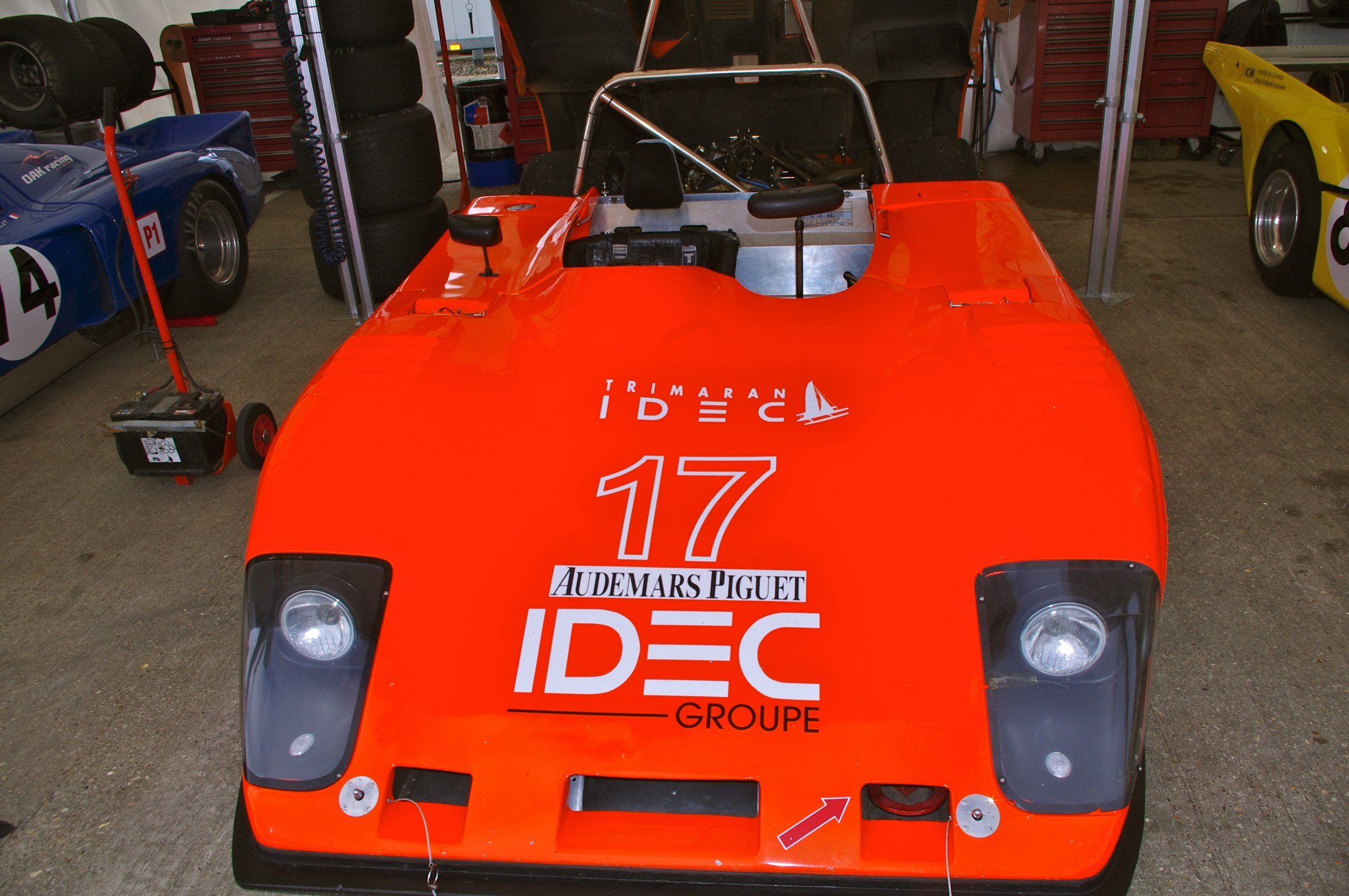
Lola T298

The T292 proved to be a notable commercial success, with a production of almost thirty units, while many of the previous T290s were upgraded with the bodywork of the T292 and for 1974 the car was further evolved into a T294 equipped with a BMW M12 powertrain, although these changes did not they were enough to counter the dominance of the Renault-powered Alpine A441, so much so that the European 2-liter was canceled for 1975 and production of the T290 series was resumed in 1976. Subsequent models were named T297 (1978), T298 (1978-80), and T299 (1981).

== Racing history ==
The large number of units produced, especially the T290 series, meant that these cars were used in the most disparate competitions.

Driver Chris Craft won the European title in the "2-liter sports car" category in 1973 using a T292 equipped with a 275 HP Cosworth BDG engine.
