= Osella PA2 =

- Category: Group 5 (Sports 2000) prototype
- Designer: Osella
- Production: 1974-1975

Technical specifications
- Chassis: Fiberglass aluminum monocoque with steel tubular rear subframe
- Suspension (front): Double wishbones, coil springs over dampers, anti-roll bar
- Suspension (rear): Single top links, twin lower links, Twin radius arms, coil springs over dampers, anti-roll bar
- Engine: Abarth twin-cam BMW M12/7 turbo inline-four, 1981-2000 cc
- Transmission: Hewland F.G.400 5-speed manual, rear wheel drive

Competition history
Entries	Wins	Podiums
63	3	6

The Osella PA2 is a 2-liter Group 5 (Sports 2000) prototype racing car built by Osella, to compete in the World Sportscar Championship sports car racing series from 1974 to 1975, but was used in active competition IMSA GT Championship until the end of 1985. It was initially powered by either the 2.0 L (120 cu in) Abarth twin-cam engine, or later, the BMW M12/7 Turbo engine. It scored a total of 3 wins, and 6 podiums. The type was entered 63 times.
