= Abarth-Osella 2000 Sport SE-021 =

Sports prototype race car designed and built by Italian manufacturer Osella

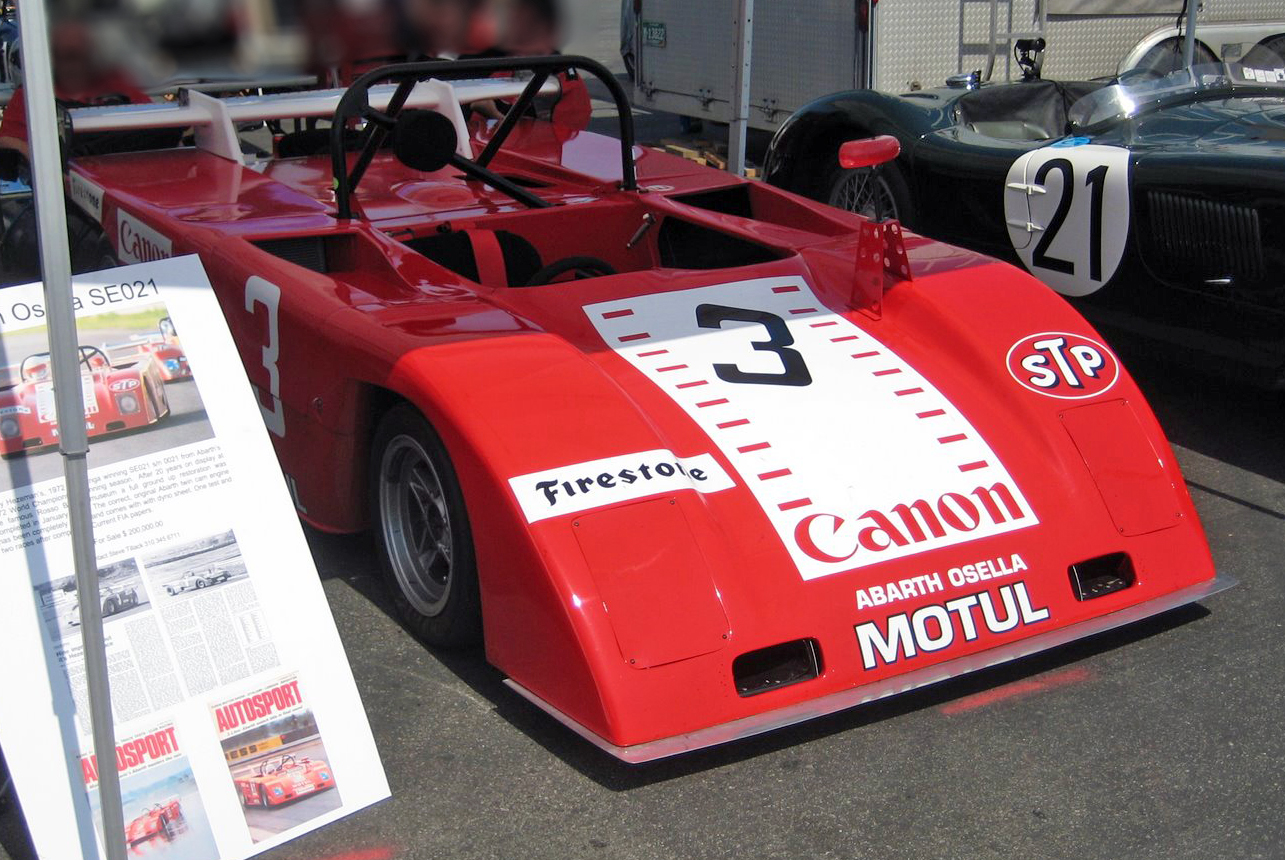
- Category: Group 5 (Sports 2000) prototype
- Designer: Abarth-Osella
- Production: 1971-1973

Technical specifications
- Axle track: 1,780 mm (70.1 in) (front); 1,780 mm (70.1 in)
- Wheelbase: 2,150 mm (84.6 in)
- Engine: Abarth 4 cylinder inline, 1946 cc
- Transmission: Hewland F.T.200 5-speed manual, rear wheel drive
- Weight: 530 kg (1,168 lb)

Competition history
Entries	Wins	Podiums
39	8	10

The Abarth-Osella 2000 Sport SE-021 is a mid-engined, Group 5 (Sports 2000), prototype race car, built by Osella to compete in the World Sportscar Championship sports car racing series in 1972, and for some races in 1973. The chassis itself was developed by Osella, while the car itself was powered by a 2.0 L (120 cu in) Abarth four-cylinder engine, generating a healthy 265 hp (198 kW). Since the light and nimble chassis only weighed 530 kg (1,170 lb), this gave it an incredible power-to-weight ratio. It was entered 39 times in races, and had 10 podiums. It scored 8 wins in its career.

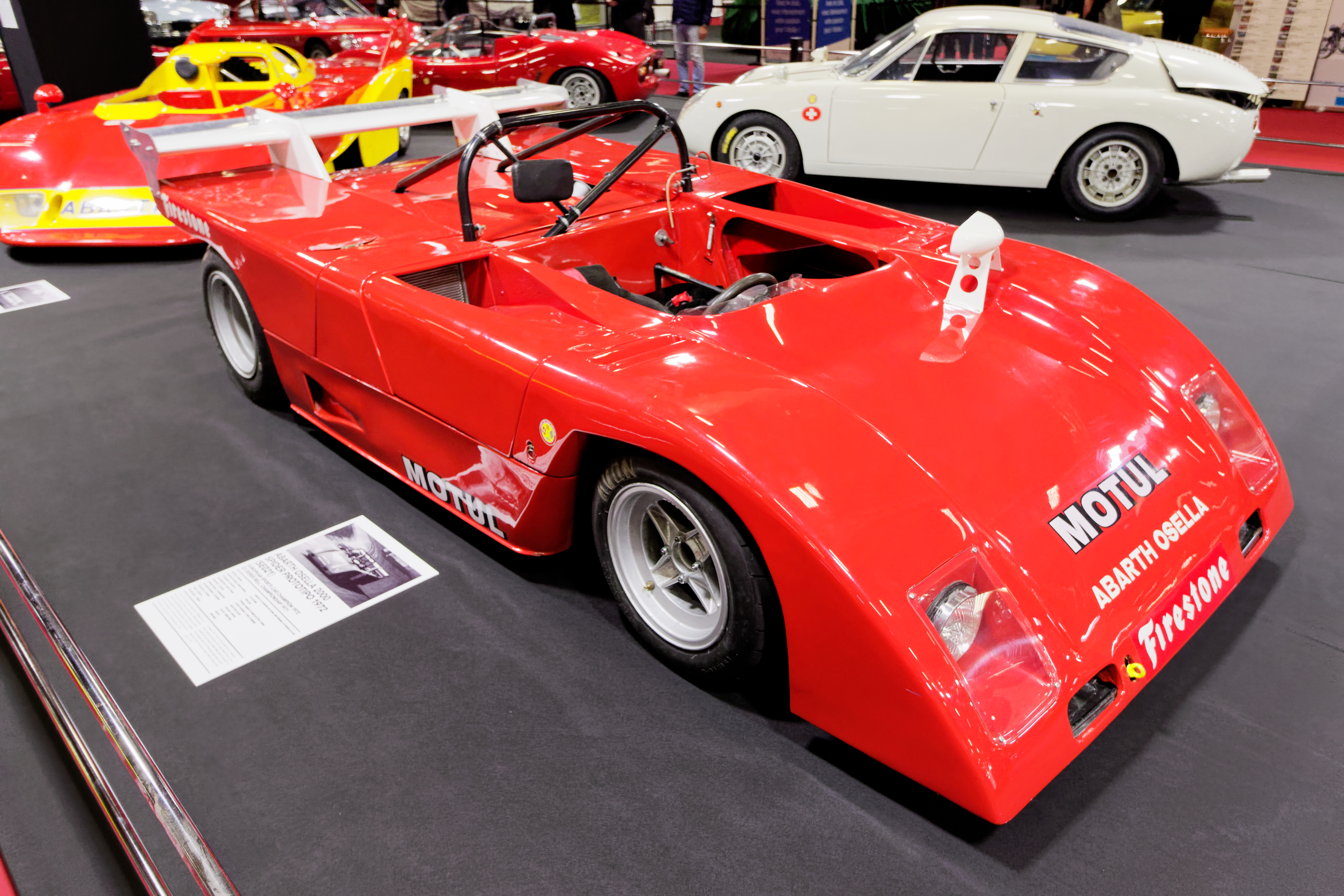

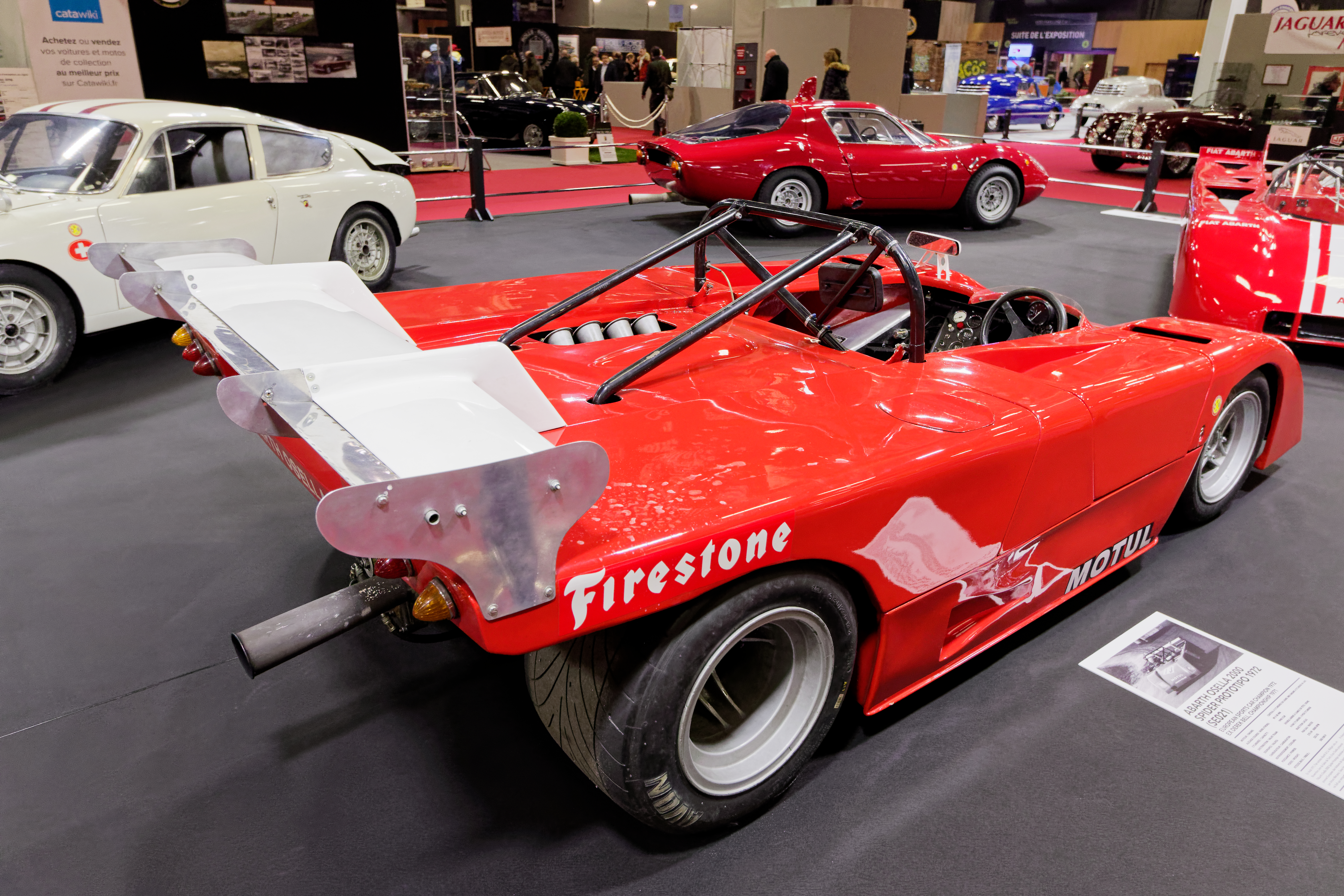

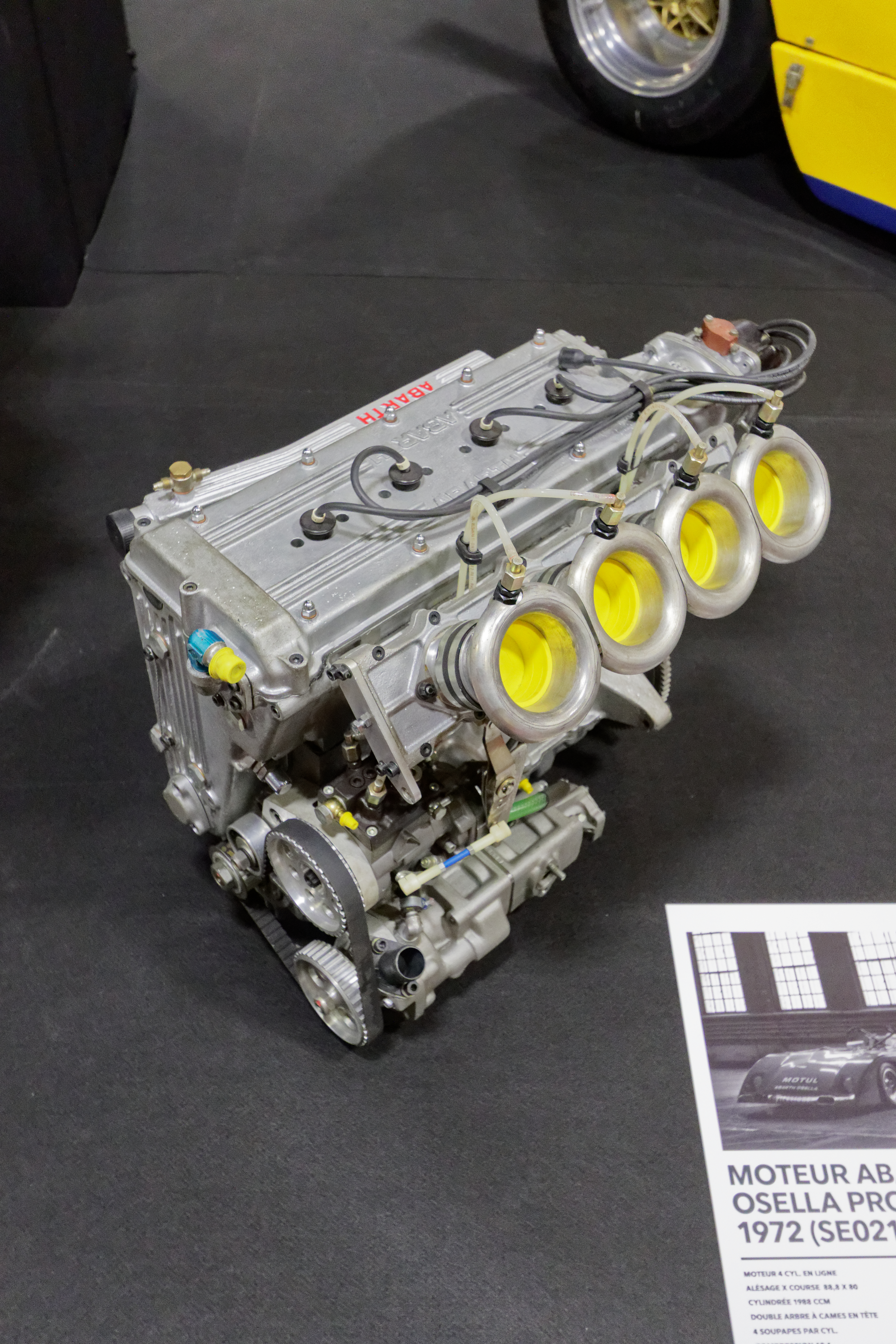
