= Group 5 (motorsport) =

1966–1982 FIA motor racing classification

Group 5 was an FIA motor racing classification which was applied to four distinct categories during the years 1966 to 1982. Initially Group 5 regulations defined a Special Touring Car category and from 1970 to 1971 the classification was applied to limited production Sports Cars restricted to 5 litre engine capacity. The Group 5 Sports Car category was redefined in 1972 to exclude the minimum production requirement and limit engine capacity to 3 litres. From 1976 to 1982 Group 5 was for Special Production Cars, a liberal silhouette formula based on homologated production vehicles.

== 1st Generation Group 5 – "Special Touring Cars" (1966 to 1969) ==
In 1966 the FIA introduced a number of new racing categories including one for highly modified touring cars, officially known as Group 5 Special Touring Cars. The regulations permitted vehicle modifications beyond those allowed in the concurrent Group 1 and Group 2 Touring Car categories. Group 5 regulations were adopted for the British Saloon Car Championship from 1966 and for the European Touring Car Championship from 1968. The Special Touring Cars category was discontinued after the 1969 season.

== 2nd Generation Group 5 - "Sports Cars" (1970 to 1971) ==
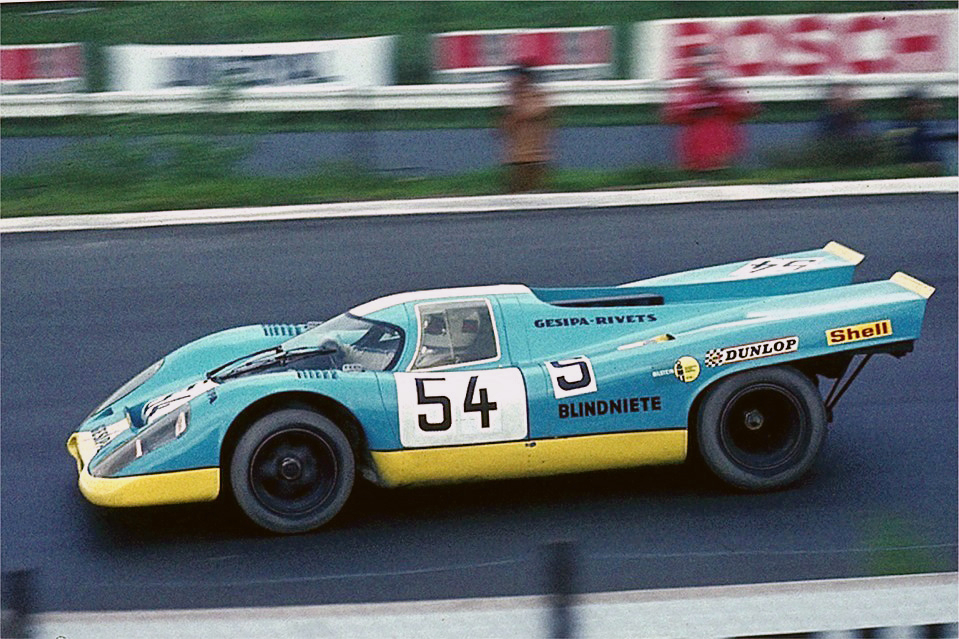
Group 5 Porsche 917 competing in the 1970 International Championship for Makes

For the 1970 season, the FIA applied the Group 5 classification to the Sports Car class which had previously been known as Group 4 Sports Cars. The minimum production requirement remained at 25 and the engine capacity maximum at 5 litres as had applied in the superseded Group 4. Group 5 Sports Cars contested the FIA's International Championship for Makes in 1970 & 1971, alongside the 3 litre Group 6 Prototype Sports Cars.

During 1970 the FIA decided to replace the existing Group 5 Sports Car category when the rules expired at the end of the 1971 season, so the big 917s and 512s would have to be retired at the end of that year. Surprisingly, Ferrari, which in late 1970 had updated the 512S to 512M spec similar to the 917K, decided to give up any official effort with the 512 in the 1971 International Championship for Makes in order to prepare a 3-litre Ferrari 312PB for the new 1972 season regulations. But many 512s were still raced by private teams, most of them converted to M specification. As a result of the rule change, sports car racing popularity suffered and did not recover until the following decade, with the advent of Group C which incidentally were forced out of competition in favour of the 3.5 atmo engine formula, reminiscent of events nineteen years previous.

=== Background to the 5 Litre Sports Car category ===
In an effort to reduce the speeds generated at 1967 Le Mans and other fast circuits of the day by the unlimited capacity Group 6 Prototypes such as the 7 litre Fords, and to entice manufacturers of 3 litre Formula One engines into endurance racing, the Commission Sportive Internationale (then the independent competition arm of the FIA) announced that the new International Championship for Makes would be run for Group 6 Sports-Prototypes limited to 3 litre capacity for the four years from 1968 through 1971.

Well-aware that few manufacturers were ready to immediately take up the challenge, the CSI also allowed the participation of 5 litre Group 4 Sports Cars manufactured in quantities of at least 50 units. This targeted existing cars like the aging 1965 Ford GT40 Mk.I (which received permission for modifications) and the slightly newer Lola T70 coupe.

In April 1968, the CSI announced that, as there were still too few entries in the 3 litres Group 6 Prototype category, the minimal production figure to compete in the Group 4 Sport category of the International Championship of Makes would be reduced from 50 to 25 starting in 1969 through to the planned end of the rules in 1971. This was mainly to allow the homologation in Group 4 of cars such as the Ferrari 250 LM and the Lola T70 which had not been manufactured in sufficient quantities to qualify (unless, in the case of the Lola T70, the open Can-Am cars were counted as well).

Starting in July 1968, still in secret, Porsche made an effort to take advantage of this rule. As they were rebuilding race cars with new chassis every race or two anyway, they decided to conceive, design and build 25 versions of a whole new car for the Sport category with one underlying goal: to win its first overall victory in the 24 Hours of Le Mans. In only ten months the Porsche 917 was developed, based upon the Porsche 908, with Porsche's first 12-cylinder engine, and many components made of titanium, magnesium and exotic alloys that had been developed for lightweight hillclimb racers. Other ways of weight reduction were rather simple, like a gear lever knob made of Balsa wood.

When Porsche was first visited by the CSI inspectors only three cars were completed, while 18 were being assembled and seven additional sets of parts were present. Porsche argued that if they assembled the cars they would then have to take them apart again to prepare the cars for racing. The inspectors refused the homologation and asked to see 25 assembled and working cars.

On April 20 Ferdinand Piëch displayed 25 917s parked in front of the Porsche factory to the CSI inspectors. Piëch even offered the opportunity to drive one of the cars, which was declined.

During June 1969, Enzo Ferrari sold half of his stock to FIAT, and used some of that money to do what Porsche did 6 months earlier with the 917, to build 25 cars powered by a 5-litre V12 in order to compete against them. With the financial help of Fiat, that risky investment was made, and surplus cars were intended to be sold to racing customers to compete for the 1970 season. Within 9 months Ferrari manufactured enough Ferrari 512S to get homologation.

Ferrari entries not only consisted of the factory cars, tuned by SpA SEFAC. There were also private cars of Scuderia Filipinetti, N.A.R.T., Écurie Francorchamps, Scuderia Picchio Rosso, Gelo Racing Team and Escuderia Montjuich which did not receive the same support from the factory. They were considered as field fillers, never as candidates for a win. At Porsche, however, JWA Gulf, KG Salzburg who were then replaced by Martini Racing for the following season, received all direct factory support and the privateers like AAW Shell Racing and David Piper Racing received a much better support than Ferrari's clients.

In May 1969, following crashs in F1, the FIA limited the use of adjustable wings. This ban affected also the 917. Its instability problem was resolved in late 1969 with a revised rear hatch, which was called 917K (Kurzheck). There was a long tail version known as the 917L (Langheck). Towards the end of the 1970 season, Ferrari entered some races with a new version of the 512S, the 512M (Modificata) which had revised bodywork similar to the 917K.

== 3rd Generation Group 5 – "Sports Cars" (1972 to 1975) ==
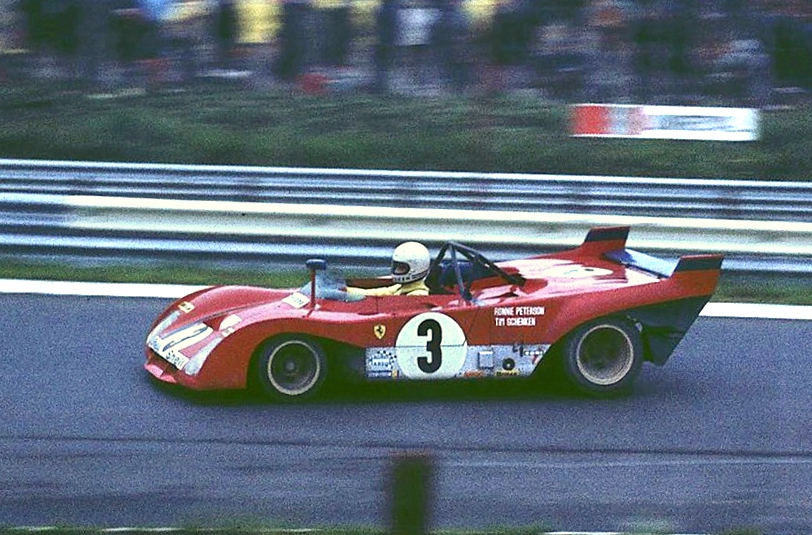
Group 5 Ferrari 312PB competing in the 1972 World Championship for Makes

For 1972, the FIA applied the Group 5 classification to what had previously been known as the Group 6 Prototype Sports Cars category. These cars, now officially Group 5 Sports Cars, were limited to a 3-litre engine capacity and were to be the main competitors in events counting towards the FIA's newly renamed World Championship for Makes from 1972 to 1975. Unlike the old Group 5, there was no minimum production requirement.

== 4th Generation Group 5 – "Special Production Cars" (1976 to 1982) ==
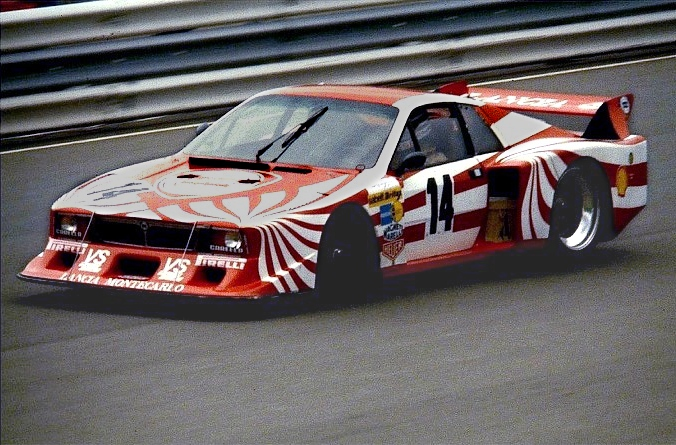
A Lancia Beta Montecarlo contesting the 1980 World Championship for Makes in the Group 5 category.

For the 1976 season the FIA introduced a new Group 5 "Special Production Car" category, allowing extensive modifications to production based vehicles which were homologated in FIA Groups 1 through 4. These cars would contest the World Championship for Makes series from 1976 through to 1980 and then the World Endurance Championship in 1981 and 1982. The Deutsche Rennsport Meisterschaft also used these regulations from 1977 until 1981. The only non-circuit events that used Group 5 cars were in the Giro d'Italia automobilistico rally.

The rules restricted the width of the car, therefore cars were built with standard body widths but wide mudguard extensions. The regulation required only the bonnet, roof, doors and rail panel were left unmodified. The rules however did not mention headlight heights, therefore when Porsche originally were to enter the 935 with the production headlight, they read the rules and discovered the loophole, therefore they raced the 935 with the hallmark flat nose. The category was also mostly associated with the wide boxy wheel arches and extravagant body style.

The category would be banished after 1982 in favour of the Group B regulation, but continued to compete in JSPC, IMSA GTX category and other national sports car racing championships for a few more years.

== List of Group 5 Cars ==
Brand	Chassis	Image	Debut	Applications	Notes
Abarth-Osella	2000 Sport SE-021		1972	3rd Generation	
Abarth-Osella	PA1		1973	3rd Generation	
Alfa Romeo	GTV		1976	4th Generation	
Alfa Romeo	T33/3		1970	2nd Generation	
Alfa Romeo	T/33/TT/12		1973	3rd Generation	
Alpine	A441		1974	3rd Generation	
BMW	2002		1976	4th Generation	
BMW	2002 Turbo			4th Generation	
BMW	3.0CSL		1976	4th Generation	
BMW	3.5 CSL		1973	4th Generation	
BMW	320i Turbo		1977	4th Generation	
Chevrolet	Monza		1976	4th Generation	
Chevron	B21		1972	3rd Generation	
Chevron	B23		1973	3rd Generation	
De Tomaso	Pantera		1976	4th Generation	
Ferrari	308 GTB		1979	4th Generation	
Ferrari	312 PB		1972	3rd Generation	Previous versions raced in Group 6.
Ferrari	512 M		1971	2nd Generation	
Ferrari	512 S		1970	2nd Generation	
Fiat	Abarth 1000 TCR		1969	1st Generation	
Ford	Capri		1981	4th Generation	
Ford	Escort		1976	4th Generation	
March	73S		1973	3rd Generation	
March	74S		1974	3rd Generation	
Matra	Simca MS630		1967	1st Generation	
Matra	Simca MS670		1972	3rd Generation	
Matra	Simca MS670B		1973	3rd Generation	
Matra	Simca MS670C		1974	3rd Generation	
Mirage	GR7		1974	3rd Generation	
Mirage	GR8		1975	3rd Generation	
Mirage	M6		1972	3rd Generation	
Lancia	Montecarlo Turbo		1979	4th Generation	
Lancia	Stratos Turbo		1973	3rd Generation	
Ligier	JS2		1975	3rd Generation	
Lola	T280		1972	3rd Generation	Later versions would race in Group 6.
Lola	T290		1972	3rd Generation	
Lola	T292		1974	3rd Generation	
Lola	T380		1975	3rd Generation	
Lotus	Cortina		1966	1st Generation	
Lotus	Cortina Mk 2		1968	1st Generation	
Lotus	Esprit S1		1980	4th Generation	
Osella	PA2		1974	3rd Generation	
Porsche	908/03		1972	3rd Generation	Previous versions raced in Group 6.
Porsche	911 RSR		1976	4th Generation	
Porsche	914		1976	4th Generation	
Porsche	917K		1970	2nd Generation	
Porsche	935		1977	4th Generation	
Simca	1000 Maurelec		1977	4th Generation	Previous versions raced in Group 2
Triumph	TR8		1979	4th Generation	

== Racing Series that included FIA Group 5 cars ==
=== 1st Generation ===
- European Touring Car Championship (1968 to 1969)
- British Touring Car Championship (1966 to 1969)

=== 2nd Generation ===
- International Championship for Makes (1970 to 1971)

=== 3rd Generation ===
- World Championship for Makes (1972 to 1975)

=== 4th Generation ===
- World Championship for Makes (1976 to 1980)
- World Endurance Championship (1981 to 1982)
- Deutsche Rennsport Meisterschaft
- Giro d'Italia automobilistico (1977–80)
- Australian GT Championship (1982–85)

== Groups 1-9 ==
Categories and Groups of Appendix J 1954 - 1965
Categories	1954	1955	1956	1957	1958	1959	1960	1961	1962	1963	1964	1965
Categories	I. Touring						A. Touring					
Categories	II. Sports				II. Grand Touring		B. Grand Touring					
Categories	-						C. Sports					
Group	1954	1955	1956	1957	1958	1959	1960	1961	1962	1963	1964	1965
Group 1	Normal series production											
Group 2	"Grand Touring" series prod				Modified series prod		Modified series prod					
Group 3	Special series production						Grand Touring Cars					
Group 4	Series production				Normal GT series prod		Sports Car					
Group 5	International				Modified GT series prod		-					
Group 6	-				GT specials		-					

Categories and Groups of Appendix J 1966 - 1981 (Production requirement)
Categories	1966	1967	1968	1969	1970	1971	1972	1973	1974	1975	1976	1977	1978	1979	1980	1981
Categories	A. Production															
Categories	B. Special				B. Experimental Competition						B. Racing Cars					
Categories	C. Racing Cars										-					
Group	1966	1967	1968	1969	1970	1971	1972	1973	1974	1975	1976	1977	1978	1979	1980	1981
Group 1	Series Touring (5000)															
Group 2	Touring (1000)				Special Touring (1000)											
Group 3	Grand Touring (500)				Series Grand Touring (1000)											
Group 4	Sportscars (50/25)				Special Grand Touring (500)						Grand Touring (400)					
Group 5	Special Touring Cars				Sports cars (25)		Sports cars				Special cars derived from Groups 1-4					
Group 6	Prototype sportscars						-				Two-seater racecars					
Group 7	Two-seater racecars										International formula					
Group 8	Formula racing cars						International formula				Formula libre racing cars					
Group 9	Formula libre racing cars										-					
Source: Note: Special may be replaced with Competition in some official documents.
