= F-1 Grand Prix (video game series) =

Video game

- Arcade flyer of F1 Grand Prix, the first game in the series.
- Genre(s): Racing
- Developer(s): Video System (1991-1995); Paradigm Entertainment (1998-2000); Eutechnyx (2001)
- Publisher(s): Video System; Eidos Interactive; Konami (GBC versions in Japan)
- Platform(s): Arcade, Super Nintendo Entertainment System, Nintendo 64, Dreamcast, Game Boy Color, PlayStation, Microsoft Windows

F-1 Grand Prix (エフワングランプリ) is a series of Formula One video games developed and published by Video System, primarily known for developing the Aero Fighters series. Prior to obtaining the FOCA license, the company previously released an arcade game in 1989 (based on the 1988 season) called Tail to Nose: Great Championship (known in Japan as Super Formula: Chijō Saisoku no Battle). Video System began releasing officially licensed titles in 1991 as an arcade game and for the Super Nintendo Entertainment System, initially featuring content from the 1991 season; the company later followed up by releasing games based on the 1992 and 1993 seasons, although the 1993 season game had no arcade release. The arcade and SNES games are played with a top-down view centered on the players chosen vehicles. These titles feature the song "Truth" by T-Square, featured branding from Fuji Television's Formula One coverage, and the SNES versions were only released in Japan. Video System also developed SD F-1 Grand Prix, a Super Mario Kart style game featuring animal caricatures of selected 1994 drivers.

In 1998, Video System regained the Formula One license after a three-year break. The later games, named under the F1 World Grand Prix banner, featured a 3D polygon-based simulation-style racing. Some of these titles were also published by Eidos Interactive. Video System is also credited as a publisher for F1 Racing Championship, based on the 1999 season and developed by Ubi Soft.

== Games ==
The following is a list of games released in the series. The first four games was released exclusively in Japan.

Japanese title	English title	System	Year	Season featured
F-1グランプリ	F-1 Grand Prix	Arcade; Super Famicom	1991; 1992	1991
F-1グランプリ PART II	F-1 Grand Prix Part II	Arcade; Super Famicom	1992; 1993	1992
F-1グランプリ PART III	F-1 Grand Prix Part III	Super Famicom	1994	1993
SDF-1グランプリ	SD F-1 Grand Prix	Super Famicom	1995	1994 (drivers); 1995 (tracks)
F-1ワールドグランプリ	F-1 World Grand Prix	N64; Dreamcast; GBC; PS1; PC	1998; 1999; 1999; 2000; 2000	1997 (N64); 1998 (Dreamcast, GBC); 1999 (Windows)
F-1ワールドグランプリII	F-1 World Grand Prix II	N64; GBC; Dreamcast	1999; 2000; 2000	1998 (N64); 1999 (GBC, Dreamcast)
F1ワールドグランプリ2000	F1 World Grand Prix 2000	PS1; PC	2001; 2001	2000

== Reception ==
The Super Famicom version of F-1 Grand Prix topped the Japanese Famitsu sales chart in May 1992.
