= SDF-1 =

SDF-1 may refer to:

- Stromal cell-derived factor 1, a protein in cell biology
- SDF-1 Macross, a fictional spaceship from the anime series Super Dimension Fortress Macross
  - SDF-1, in the Robotech franchise
- SDF1, an Amazon location

== See also ==
- SD F-1 Grand Prix
