= 1994 Hungarian Grand Prix =

- Race 10 of 16 in the 1994 Formula One World Championship

Race details
- Date: 14 August 1994
- Official name: X Marlboro Magyar Nagydij
- Location: Hungaroring; Mogyoród, Pest, Hungary
- Course: Permanent racing facility
- Course length: 3.968 km (2.466 miles)
- Distance: 77 laps, 305.536 km (189.851 miles)
- Weather: Sunny

Pole position
Driver	(Germany) Michael Schumacher	Benetton-Ford
- Time: 1:18.258

Fastest lap
Driver	(Germany) Michael Schumacher	Benetton-Ford
- Time: 1:20.881 on lap 5

Podium
First	(Germany) Michael Schumacher	Benetton-Ford
Second	(United Kingdom) Damon Hill	Williams-Renault
Third	(Netherlands) Jos Verstappen	Benetton-Ford

The 1994 Hungarian Grand Prix was a Formula One motor race held on 14 August 1994 at the Hungaroring, Mogyoród, Pest, Hungary. It was the tenth race of the 1994 Formula One World Championship.

The 77-lap race was won from pole position by Michael Schumacher, driving a Benetton-Ford. Schumacher's Drivers' Championship rival, Damon Hill, finished second in a Williams-Renault, with Jos Verstappen third in the other Benetton-Ford after Martin Brundle suffered an electrical failure in his McLaren-Peugeot on the final lap. Brundle was partnered for this race by McLaren tester Philippe Alliot, deputising for a suspended Mika Häkkinen.

The win, Schumacher's seventh of the season, meant that his lead over Hill in the Drivers' Championship stood at 31 points with six races remaining.

Jos Verstappen's podium finish was the first achieved by a Dutch driver in F1.

== Weekend report before qualifying ==
Benetton and McLaren were both in trouble with issues found by the FIA after the German Grand Prix. Benetton were troubled with the result of Jos Verstappen's fiery pit stop at Hockenheimring, which was caused by the team removing a filter from the fuelling system. The FIA believed it allowed a piece of debris to become lodged within a valve of the nozzle that caused the fuel to spill out onto the bodywork. It was highly criticised by the FIA with the design of the fuel rig, as to which the FIA had required all teams to use with the regulation changes. McLaren were troubled with the result of Mika Häkkinen receiving a one race ban for causing a crash on the first lap of the German Grand Prix and was replaced by Philippe Alliot who made his first Grand Prix start since the Portuguese Grand Prix the previous year but had spun off the circuit during first practice which left to take over Brundle's car. This did not bring much satisfaction for the head of Peugeot engineering and fellow Frenchman Jean-Pierre Jabouille, who had been actively campaigning the McLaren management to replace Brundle with Alliot for several months.

== Qualifying ==
The front row was locked out by the championship contenders Michael Schumacher and Damon Hill with Schumacher half a second quicker than Hill with the Benetton of Schumacher also quickest during the Sunday morning warm-up. With the top ten being completed by Coulthard third in the other Williams, Berger fourth for Ferrari as Berger's teammate Alesi could do not better than 13th due to handling issues behind Jos Verstappen's Benetton but also ahead of Alliot's McLaren who was 14th (which left McLaren separated by eight places), Katayama fifth for Tyrrell, Brundle sixth for McLaren, Eddie Irvine seventh for Jordan, Frentzen eighth for Sauber, Panis was ninth for Ligier & Rubens Barrichello completing the top ten in the other Jordan.

== Race ==
Despite being on the clean side of the track, Schumacher got off to a bad start compared to Hill's Williams but managed to brake later than Hill allowing him to retake the lead ahead of Hill, Coulthard, Berger, Katayama, and Brundle through turn 1. The Jordans of Irvine and Barrichello were quick and surpassed Brundle and Katayama, but the Jordan teammates collided at the second turn and took off Katayama as well forcing all three drivers to immediately retire. Alesi was able to pass Panis for sixth. Nothing changed in the order after the first round of pit stops, but eventually there was action behind as Berger stalled which left him to drop behind Brundle, Alesi, and Verstappen. Ferrari's bad luck continued as Alesi's engine failed on lap 59 and left oil on the track which caused David Coulthard to spin off and crash out of third place into the wall a lap later as the other Ferrari of Gerhard Berger also retired with engine failure on lap 73. Martin Brundle stopped on the last lap with an electrical failure, denying him of a podium and handing his place to Jos Verstappen who was just behind him. Michael Schumacher claimed his seventh victory of the season ahead of Damon Hill, teammate Jos Verstappen (the first Dutchman to climb the podium in the category), Martin Brundle, Mark Blundell for Tyrrell and Olivier Panis scoring sixth for Ligier.

== Classification ==
=== Qualifying ===
Pos	No	Driver	Constructor	Q1	Q2	Gap
1	5	(Germany) Michael Schumacher	Benetton-Ford	1:19.479	1:18.258	
2	0	(United Kingdom) Damon Hill	Williams-Renault	1:19.700	1:18.824	+0.566
3	2	(United Kingdom) David Coulthard	Williams-Renault	1:20.395	1:20.205	+1.947
4	28	(Austria) Gerhard Berger	Ferrari	1:21.009	1:20.219	+1.961
5	3	(Japan) Ukyo Katayama	Tyrrell-Yamaha	1:21.877	1:20.232	+1.974
6	8	(United Kingdom) Martin Brundle	McLaren-Peugeot	1:20.819	1:20.629	+2.371
7	15	(United Kingdom) Eddie Irvine	Jordan-Hart	1:21.406	1:20.698	+2.440
8	30	(Germany) Heinz-Harald Frentzen	Sauber-Mercedes	1:22.268	1:20.858	+2.600
9	26	(France) Olivier Panis	Ligier-Renault	1:23.244	1:20.929	+2.671
10	14	(Brazil) Rubens Barrichello	Jordan-Hart	1:21.498	1:20.952	+2.694
11	4	(United Kingdom) Mark Blundell	Tyrrell-Yamaha	1:21.731	1:20.984	+2.726
12	6	(Netherlands) Jos Verstappen	Benetton-Ford	1:21.141	9:03.939	+2.883
13	27	(France) Jean Alesi	Ferrari	1:21.280	1:21.206	+2.948
14	7	(France) Philippe Alliot	McLaren-Peugeot	1:22.915	1:21.498	+3.240
15	23	(Italy) Pierluigi Martini	Minardi-Ford	1:24.440	1:21.837	+3.579
16	9	(Brazil) Christian Fittipaldi	Footwork-Ford	1:22.375	1:21.873	+3.615
17	29	(Italy) Andrea de Cesaris	Sauber-Mercedes	1:23.573	1:21.946	+3.688
18	25	(France) Éric Bernard	Ligier-Renault	1:23.269	1:22.038	+3.780
19	10	(Italy) Gianni Morbidelli	Footwork-Ford	1:22.311	1:30.262	+4.053
20	24	(Italy) Michele Alboreto	Minardi-Ford	1:22.379	1:22.379	+4.121
21	20	(France) Érik Comas	Larrousse-Ford	1:22.754	1:22.487	+4.229
22	11	(Italy) Alessandro Zanardi	Lotus-Mugen-Honda	1:23.361	1:22.513	+4.255
23	31	(Australia) David Brabham	Simtek-Ford	1:24.181	1:22.614	+4.356
24	12	(United Kingdom) Johnny Herbert	Lotus-Mugen-Honda	1:23.306	1:22.705	+4.447
25	19	(Monaco) Olivier Beretta	Larrousse-Ford	1:24.645	1:22.899	+4.641
26	32	(France) Jean-Marc Gounon	Simtek-Ford	1:26.678	1:24.191	+5.933
DNQ	34	(France) Bertrand Gachot	Pacific-Ilmor	1:26.521	1:24.908	+6.650
DNQ	33	(France) Paul Belmondo	Pacific-Ilmor	1:28.334	1:26.275	+8.017

=== Race ===
Pos	No	Driver	Constructor	Laps	Time/Retired	Grid	Points
1	5	(Germany) Michael Schumacher	Benetton-Ford	77	1:48:00.185	1	10
2	0	(United Kingdom) Damon Hill	Williams-Renault	77	+ 20.827	2	6
3	6	(Netherlands) Jos Verstappen	Benetton-Ford	77	+ 1:10.329	12	4
4	8	(United Kingdom) Martin Brundle	McLaren-Peugeot	76	Electrical	6	3
5	4	(United Kingdom) Mark Blundell	Tyrrell-Yamaha	76	+ 1 Lap	11	2
6	26	(France) Olivier Panis	Ligier-Renault	76	+ 1 Lap	9	1
7	24	(Italy) Michele Alboreto	Minardi-Ford	75	+ 2 Laps	20	
8	20	(France) Érik Comas	Larrousse-Ford	75	+ 2 Laps	21	
9	19	(Monaco) Olivier Beretta	Larrousse-Ford	75	+ 2 Laps	25	
10	25	(France) Éric Bernard	Ligier-Renault	75	+ 2 Laps	18	
11	31	(Australia) David Brabham	Simtek-Ford	74	+ 3 Laps	23	
12	28	(Austria) Gerhard Berger	Ferrari	72	Engine	4	
13	11	(Italy) Alessandro Zanardi	Lotus-Mugen-Honda	72	+ 5 Laps	22	
14	9	(Brazil) Christian Fittipaldi	Footwork-Ford	69	Transmission	16	
Ret	2	(United Kingdom) David Coulthard	Williams-Renault	59	Spun Off	3	
Ret	27	(France) Jean Alesi	Ferrari	58	Gearbox	13	
Ret	23	(Italy) Pierluigi Martini	Minardi-Ford	58	Spun Off	15	
Ret	30	(Germany) Heinz-Harald Frentzen	Sauber-Mercedes	39	Gearbox	8	
Ret	12	(United Kingdom) Johnny Herbert	Lotus-Mugen-Honda	34	Electrical	24	
Ret	29	(Italy) Andrea de Cesaris	Sauber-Mercedes	30	Collision	17	
Ret	10	(Italy) Gianni Morbidelli	Footwork-Ford	30	Collision	19	
Ret	7	(France) Philippe Alliot	McLaren-Peugeot	21	Water Leak	14	
Ret	32	(France) Jean-Marc Gounon	Simtek-Ford	9	Handling	26	
Ret	3	(Japan) Ukyo Katayama	Tyrrell-Yamaha	0	Collision	5	
Ret	15	(United Kingdom) Eddie Irvine	Jordan-Hart	0	Collision	7	
Ret	14	(Brazil) Rubens Barrichello	Jordan-Hart	0	Collision	10	

== Championship standings after the race ==
Drivers' Championship standings

Pos	Driver	Points
1	(Germany) Michael Schumacher	76
2	(United Kingdom) Damon Hill	45
3	(Austria) Gerhard Berger	27
4	(France) Jean Alesi	19
5	(Brazil) Rubens Barrichello	10

Constructors' Championship standings

Pos	Constructor	Points
1	(United Kingdom) Benetton-Ford	81
2	(Italy) Ferrari	52
3	(United Kingdom) Williams-Renault	49
4	(United Kingdom) McLaren-Peugeot	17
5	(Republic of Ireland) Jordan-Hart	14

Previous race: 1994 German Grand Prix	FIA Formula One World Championship; 1994 season	Next race: 1994 Belgian Grand Prix
Previous race: 1993 Hungarian Grand Prix	Hungarian Grand Prix	Next race: 1995 Hungarian Grand Prix
