= McLaren MP4/9 =

Formula One racing car for the 1994 season

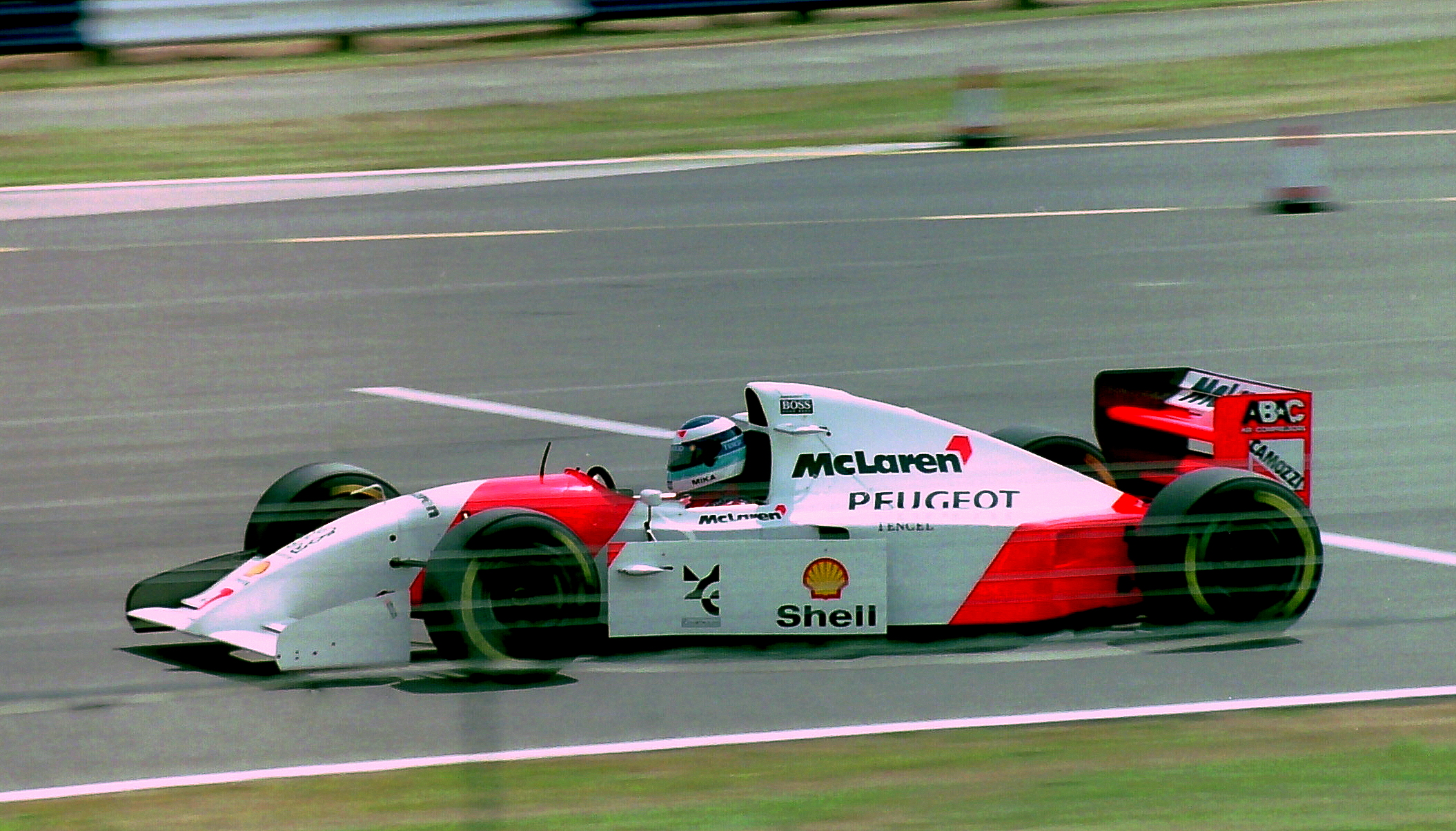
- Mika Häkkinen driving the MP4/9 at the 1994 British Grand Prix
- Category: Formula One
- Constructor: McLaren
- Designers: Neil Oatley (Executive Engineer); Matthew Jeffreys (Head of Vehicle Design); David North (Head of Transmission); David Neilson (Head of Suspension); Paddy Lowe (Head of R&D); Henri Durand (Head of Aerodynamics); Jean-Pierre Boudy (Chief Engine Designer - Peugeot Sport)
- Predecessor: MP4/8
- Successor: MP4/10

Technical specifications
- Chassis: Carbon fibre and honeycomb composite structure
- Suspension (front): Double wishbones, pushrod, inboard spring / damper / actuator
- Suspension (rear): Double wishbones, pushrod, inboard spring / damper / actuator
- Axle track: Front: 1,690 mm (67 in); Rear: 1,615 mm (63.6 in)
- Wheelbase: 2,845 mm (112.0 in)
- Engine: Peugeot A4/A6, 3,499 cc (213.5 cu in), 80° V10, NA, mid-engine, longitudinally mounted
- Transmission: McLaren / TAG transverse 6-Speed semi-automatic sequential
- Power: 700–760 hp (522–567 kW; 710–771 PS) @ 14,250-14,500 rpm
- Weight: 515 kg (1,135 lb)
- Fuel: Shell
- Tyres: Goodyear

Competition history
- Notable entrants: Marlboro McLaren Peugeot
- Notable drivers: 7. (Finland) Mika Häkkinen; 7. (France) Philippe Alliot; 8. (United Kingdom) Martin Brundle
- Debut: 1994 Brazilian Grand Prix
- Last event: 1994 Australian Grand Prix
Races	Wins	Podiums	Poles	F/Laps
16	0	8	0	0
- Constructors' Championships: 0
- Drivers' Championships: 0

The McLaren MP4/9 was a Formula One car designed by Neil Oatley and used by the McLaren team in the 1994 Formula One World Championship. The number 7 car was driven by Finn Mika Häkkinen, in his first full season with the team, while the number 8 car was driven by Briton Martin Brundle, who had signed from Ligier. Frenchman Philippe Alliot deputised in the number 7 car at the Hungarian Grand Prix when Häkkinen was banned from driving in this race.

This was the first Formula One car to utilize Peugeot engines, the only McLaren F1 car to use that engine, and the last McLaren F1 car to run with Shell fuel which the team had used since the MP4/2 in 1984.

== Background ==
=== Design ===
Due to changes in Formula One regulations intended to return emphasis on driver skills, many technologies designed to aid the driver, such as active suspension, power-assisted brakes, ABS and traction control, which had featured on the previous season's car, were no longer permitted. Visually the car was otherwise very similar to the preceding MP4/8.

The MP4/9 was initially powered by the Peugeot A4 V10 engine which produced around 700 bhp (522 kW; 710 PS). The engine proved unreliable and both Häkkinen and Brundle retired from the first two races with each suffering one engine failure. The 760 bhp (567 kW; 771 PS) A6 V10 was then introduced, and while it gave Häkkinen third place at San Marino and Brundle second at Monaco, the engine was generally regarded as a "hand grenade" due to frequent failures in testing, qualifying and races. It was not until Italy that Peugeot started to get reliability from the engine.

=== Second driver disputes ===
At the behest of Peugeot, the team's test driver was Frenchman Philippe Alliot. The French company preferred Alliot, who had been a lead driver with their World Sportscar team, over Brundle for the role of the second driver—something which infuriated McLaren team boss Ron Dennis, as he did not think much of Alliot's driving and clearly preferred Brundle; Alliot had been in F1 since 1984 and had a reputation for being fast but accident-prone. Brundle had also been racing Grands Prix since 1984 and, while fast, was also a much more steady driver. Alliot, whose only role in the team was as a test and reserve driver, only raced for the team as a one-off replacement for Häkkinen in Hungary, as the Finn was serving a one-race ban after being held responsible for a large accident on the first lap at the preceding German Grand Prix.

== 1994 season summary ==
By the standards of McLaren's recent cars the MP4/9 was a disappointment, failing to win any races (the first time McLaren had failed to win a race since 1980) and hampered by poor reliability and performance from its Peugeot engine (taken from the Peugeot 905 sports car that won Le Mans twice). Despite this, the MP4/9 was a relatively strong midfield car, as out of the 11 races it did finish, at least one car finished in the points in nine of them, and of those nine points finishes, eight of them were on the podium. Early in the season, Ron Dennis had believed rivalry between the French manufacturer and compatriots Renault would lead to rapid development and performance. As the season progressed the engines suffered regular and frequently spectacular failures (including at the British Grand Prix where Brundle's engine erupted into flames within a second of the green flag), and causing the team to doubt Peugeot's commitment to the project. On 28 October 1994 the team announced it had parted company with the engine supplier in favour of a long-term deal with full-works Ilmor-Mercedes.

The MP4/9 was replaced in 1995 by the McLaren MP4/10.

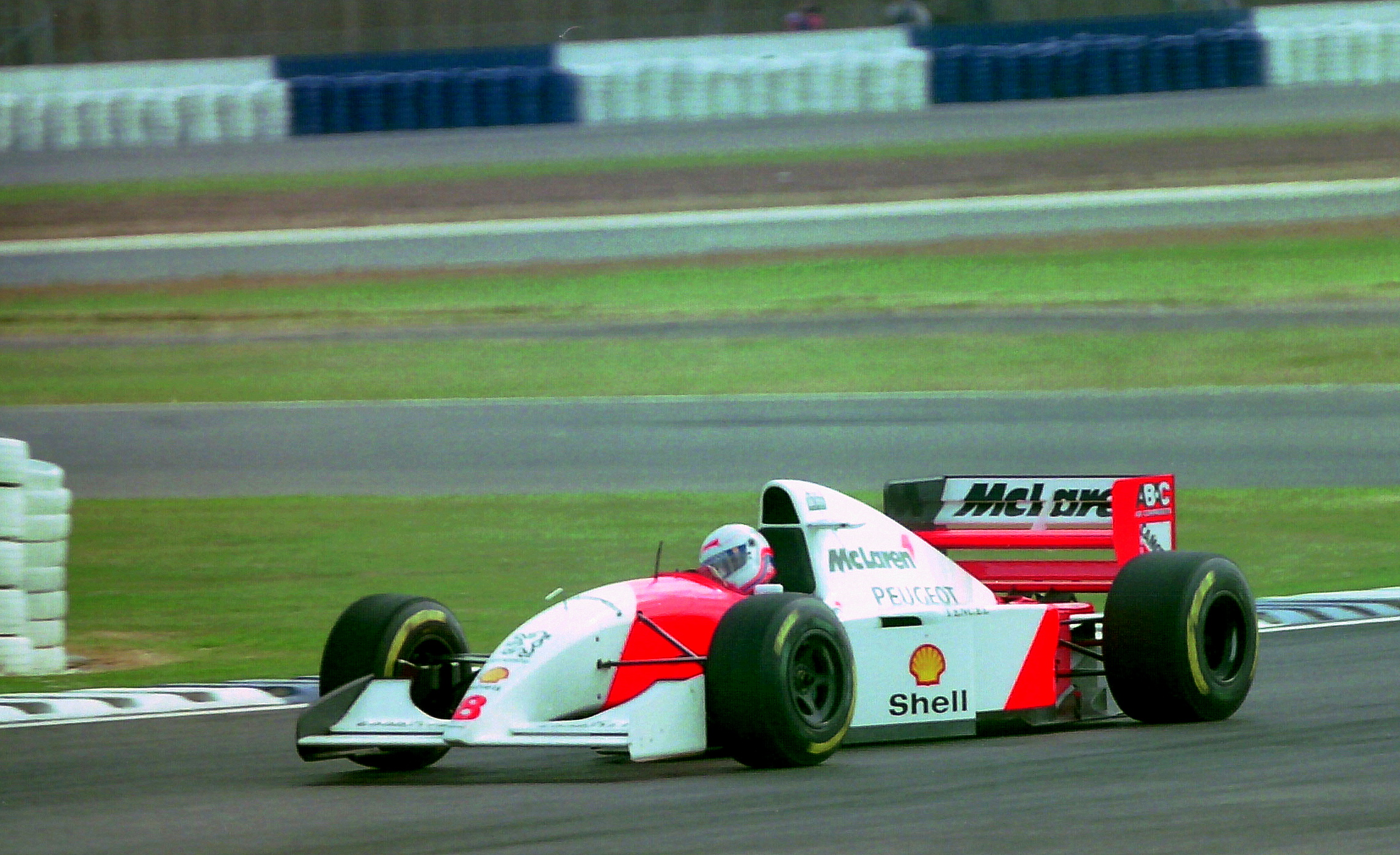
Martin Brundle driving the MP4/9 at the 1994 British Grand Prix.

== Complete Formula One results ==
(key)

Year	Team	Engine	Tyres	Drivers	1	2	3	4	5	6	7	8	9	10	11	12	13	14	15	16	Pts.	WCC
1994	Marlboro McLaren Peugeot	Peugeot A4 / A6; V10	G		BRA	PAC	SMR	MON	ESP	CAN	FRA	GBR	GER	HUN	BEL	ITA	POR	EUR	JPN	AUS	42	4th
1994	Marlboro McLaren Peugeot	Peugeot A4 / A6; V10	G	Mika Häkkinen	Ret	Ret	3	Ret	Ret	Ret	Ret	3	Ret		2	3	3	3	7	12	42	4th
1994	Marlboro McLaren Peugeot	Peugeot A4 / A6; V10	G	Philippe Alliot										Ret							42	4th
1994	Marlboro McLaren Peugeot	Peugeot A4 / A6; V10	G	Martin Brundle	Ret	Ret	8	2	11	Ret	Ret	Ret	Ret	4	Ret	5	6	Ret	Ret	3	42	4th
