= SD F-1 Grand Prix =

1995 video game

- Cover art
- Developer: Video System
- Publisher: Video System
- Composers: Naoki Itamura; P.H. Soyama
- Series: F1 Grand Prix
- Platform: Super Famicom
- Release: JP: October 27, 1995
- Genre: Arcade racing
- Modes: Single-player, multiplayer

SD F-1 Grand Prix (ＳＤ Ｆ－１グランプリ; "Super Deformed F-1 Grand Prix") is a Japan-exclusive video game based on the F1 Grand Prix series. This video game spin-off was developed for the Super Famicom by Video System.

== Gameplay ==
The sample player has consistently finished all 16 of races in Grand Prix mode and is rewarded with a gold trophy.

The player gets to control cute and cuddly cartoon animals (with the dog resembling Mika Häkkinen, the bird representing Damon Hill, and the wolf portraying Michael Schumacher, etc) in cutesy race tracks inspired by real life Formula One race tracks in a parallel universe.

An exception to this rule would be the U.S. oval track (that looks like Daytona International Speedway sans the spectator booths and a lane for pit stops). There is a Crash Race mode which, in addition to the Grand Prix mode's tracks, features tracks similar to those on Super Mario Kart, a Grand Prix mode where players get to race all the tracks one-at-a-time for points in order to get a gold, silver, or bronze trophy, and a Time Trial mode where the player gets to race against the clock. No option to restart a race exist in the GP Racing mode; neither does a game over screen. This is similar to modern racing games where games continue regardless of what position that the player finishes in.

A duo of Japanese race reporters (assuming them to be the caricatures of the then-current Fuji Television announcers) perform the play-by-play of the race in both written and spoken Japanese to the tune of J-pop instrumental music.

The available drivers are based on the 1994 season, while the Grand Prix tracks are based on the 1995 season (with exception of Hungaroring). In addition to selected 1994 drivers, Alain Prost, Nigel Mansell (in his 1994 comeback guise), and Satoru Nakajima are represented as boss characters in the Crash Race mode, with Ayrton Senna as the Crash Race mode's final boss.

== Prototype ==
The prototype version of SD F-1 Grand Prix is different from the final version in terms of its internal components. There is a CIC lockout chip that can be altered so that Super Famicoms in PAL countries can operate the game.

== See also ==
- F1 Race Stars
