= F-1 World Grand Prix II =

1999 video game

- European Nintendo 64 cover art
- Developers: Paradigm Entertainment (N64); Video System (GBC, DC)
- Publisher: Video System
- Series: F1 Grand Prix
- Platforms: Nintendo 64, Game Boy Color, Dreamcast
- Release: Nintendo 64: EU: 2 July 1999; Game Boy Color: JP: February 24, 2000; NA: 2000; PAL: 2000; Dreamcast: JP: 22 November 2000; PAL: 24 November 2000
- Genre: Sim racing
- Modes: Single-player, multiplayer

F-1 World Grand Prix II is a Formula One racing game for the Nintendo 64, Sega Dreamcast and Game Boy Color. The Nintendo 64 version was released only in Europe in 1999, with other formats following in 2000. The game is a sequel to F-1 World Grand Prix, and is based on the 1998 Formula One season (Nintendo 64 version) and the 1999 Formula One season (Game Boy Color and Dreamcast versions).

== Reception ==
Reception

Aggregate score
Aggregator	Score	
Aggregator	Dreamcast	N64
GameRankings	71%	85%

Review scores
Publication	Score	
Publication	Dreamcast	N64
IGN	7.1/10	
N64 Magazine		72%
The Sydney Morning Herald		4/5

IGN gave the Dreamcast version a 7.1 out of 10 overall praising the presentation of the game but criticised the graphics. N64 Magazine called it too similar to the previous game, giving it 72%.

== Sequel ==
A successor, F-1 World Grand Prix III, was in development and would have been based on the 1999 or 2000 season, but was never released.

A spinoff, F1 World Grand Prix 2000, developed by Eutechnyx, was released on March 8, 2001 for the PlayStation and PC.
