= Tail to Nose =

1989 video game

Super Formula: Chijō Saisoku no Battle Tail to Nose: Great Championship
- Arcade flyer of Super Formula: Chijō Saisoku no Battle.
- Developer: Video System
- Publisher: Video System
- Composer: Naoki Itamura (Gekko Itamura)
- Platform: Arcade
- Release: JP: 1989; NA: 1989
- Genre: Arcade racing (Formula One)
- Mode: Single-player

Tail to Nose: Great Championship, known in Japan as Super Formula: Chijō Saisoku no Battle (スーパーフォーミュラ・地上最速のバトル, "Super Formula: The Battle of the Fastest on the Ground"), is a 1989 Formula One-based arcade racing video game developed and published by Video System.

== Summary ==
Super Formula was one of the earliest arcade games related to Formula 1, in this case the 1988 season. Although being an unlicensed game, the teams, drivers, sponsors and the only four circuits available were inspired by real-life ones. The selectable drivers are also recognizable in the graphic representations of their faces.

It can be considered as the predecessor to the F-1 Grand Prix video game series.

== Constructors and drivers ==
Screenshot showing the gameplay.

=== Selectable ===
- (United Kingdom) Lotos Homda (Lotus Honda, main sponsor Camel)

2 - (Japan) S. Nakaji (Satoru Nakajima)
1 - (Brazil) N. Poquet (Nelson Piquet)

- (United Kingdom) McLarun Homda (McLaren Honda, main sponsor Marlboro)

11 - (France) A. Prist (Alain Prost)
12 - (Brazil) A. Seena (Ayrton Senna)

- (Italy) Ferreri (Ferrari)

28 - (Austria) G. Burger (Gerhard Berger)
27 - (Italy) M. Albert (Michele Alboreto)

- (United Kingdom) Willarms Jadd (Williams Judd, main sponsor Canon)

5 - (United Kingdom) N. Manuel (Nigel Mansell)
6 - (Italy) R. Patric (Riccardo Patrese)

- (Italy) Benetten Foad (Benetton Ford)

20 - (Belgium) T. Boozen (Thierry Boutsen)
19 - (Italy) A. Nanine (Alessandro Nannini)

- (United Kingdom) Marci Jadd (March Judd, main sponsor Leyton House)

16 - (Italy) I. Capela (Ivan Capelli)
15 - (Brazil) M. Gugmin (Maurício Gugelmin)

- The "Lotos Homda", "McLarun Homda" and "Ferreri" are 1500cc turbocharged cars.
- The "Willarms Jadd", "Benetten Foad" and "Marci Jadd" are 3500cc non-turbocharged cars.

=== Other drivers ===
- 3 - (United Kingdom) J. Palmen (Jonathan Palmer, Tyrrell)
- 4 - (United Kingdom) J. Barley (Julian Bailey, Tyrrell)
- 9 - (Italy) P. Ginzan (Piercarlo Ghinzani, Zakspeed)
- 10 - (Germany) B. Snider (Bernd Schneider, Zakspeed)
- 17 - (United Kingdom) D. Wavick (Derek Warwick, Arrows)
- 18 - (United States) E. Cheer (Eddie Cheever, Arrows)
- 23 - (Italy) P. Martea (Pierluigi Martini, Minardi)
- 24 - (Spain) L. Sola (Luis Pérez-Sala, Minardi)
- 25 - (France) R. Arneut (René Arnoux, Ligier)
- 26 - (Sweden) S. Jonson (Stefan Johansson, Ligier)
- 29 - (Japan) A. Susuki (Aguri Suzuki, Larrousse)
- 30 - (France) P. Arliot (Philippe Alliot, Larrousse)
- 32 - (Argentina) O. Lauren (Oscar Larrauri, EuroBrun)
- 33 - (Italy) S. Modela (Stefano Modena, EuroBrun)

(26 drivers)

== Circuits ==
- (United Kingdom) Silverstone
- (Japan) Suzuka
- (United States) Detroit
- (Monaco) Montecarlo
