= F1 World Grand Prix 2000 =

2001 video game

- Developer: Eutechnyx
- Publisher: Video System
- Composer: Jonathan Colling
- Platforms: Windows, PlayStation
- Release: March 8, 2001
- Genre: Racing
- Mode: Single-player

F1 World Grand Prix 2000 (also known as simply F1 World Grand Prix) is a racing video game developed by Eutechnyx, published by Video System and distributed by Eidos Interactive. It was released in March 2001. It is based on the 2000 season of the Formula One World Championship. It is the sequel to F-1 World Grand Prix II. As an officially licensed title, it includes all the teams, drivers and tracks from the 2000 Formula One season. The game features two distinct racing modes, arcade and simulation; the arcade mode follows the style of an actual arcade machine with louder music and commentary, while the simulation mode takes a more relaxed and realistic take on the genre. Music was composed by Jonathan Colling.
