= 1994 Formula One World Championship =

48th season of FIA Formula One motor racing

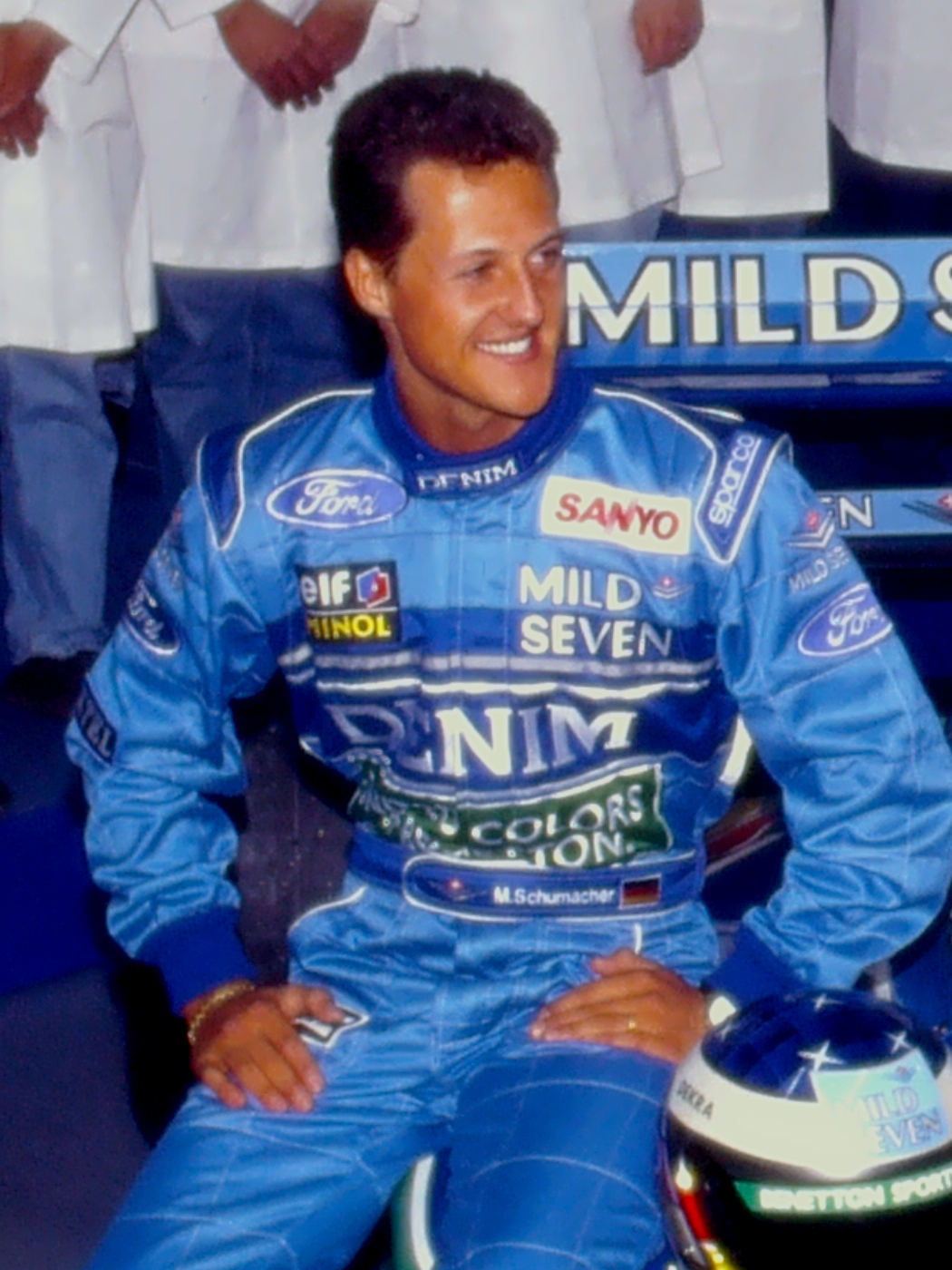
Michael Schumacher won the first of his seven World Championship titles in 1994 with Benetton, and the first Drivers' Championship for a German driver.

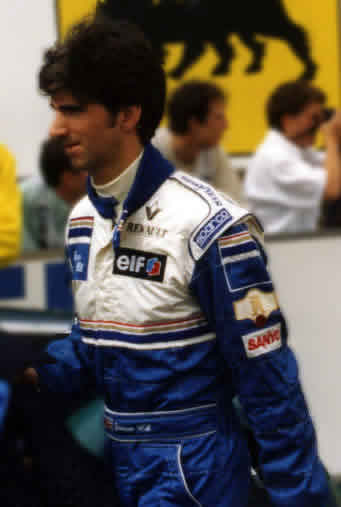
Damon Hill (pictured in 1995) was runner-up by a single point, driving for Williams.

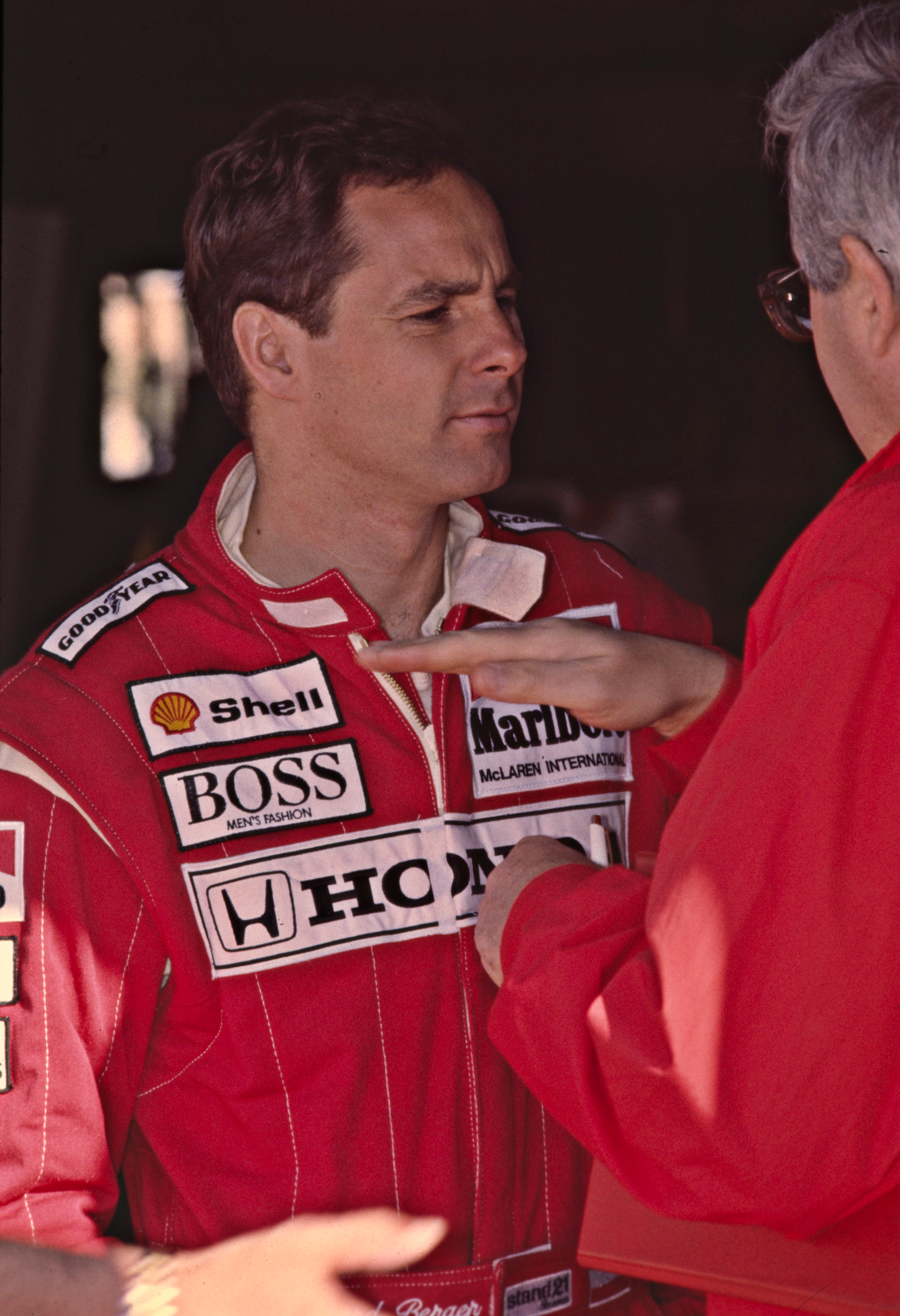
Gerhard Berger (pictured in 1991) of Scuderia Ferrari finished the season ranked third (Pictured driving for McLaren).

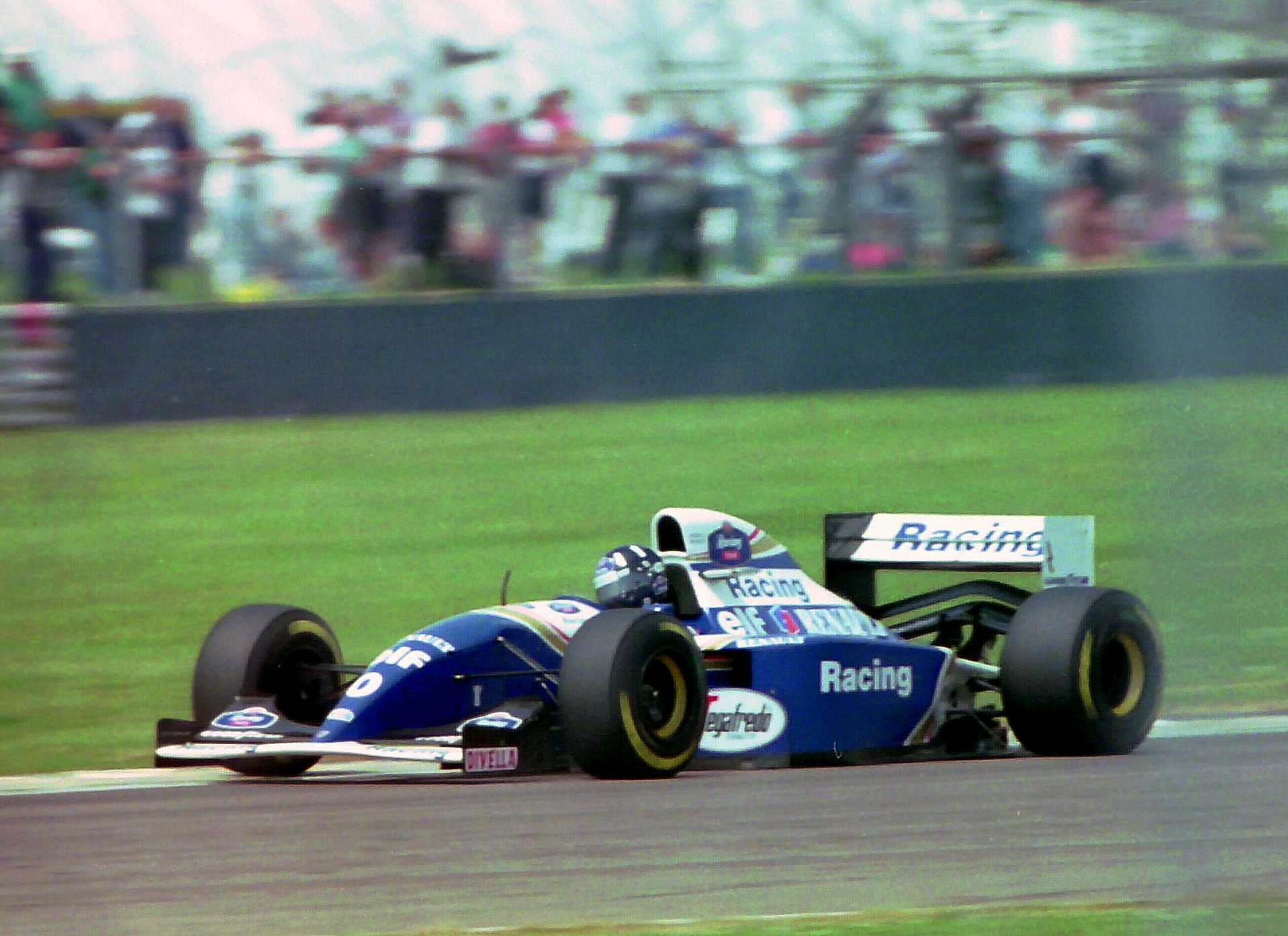
Williams-Renault won the Constructors' Championship title with the Williams FW16.

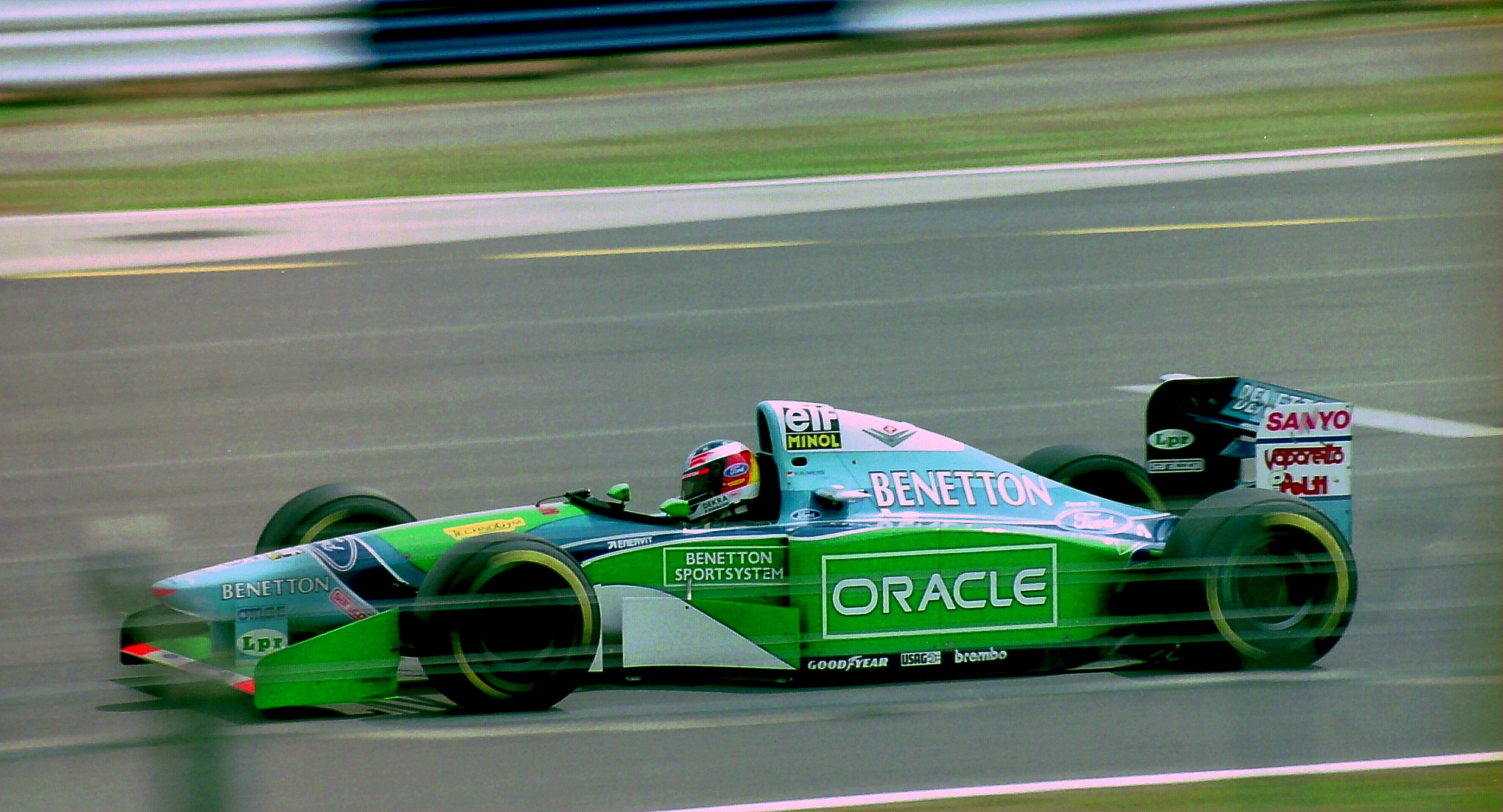
Benetton-Ford placed second with the Benetton B194.

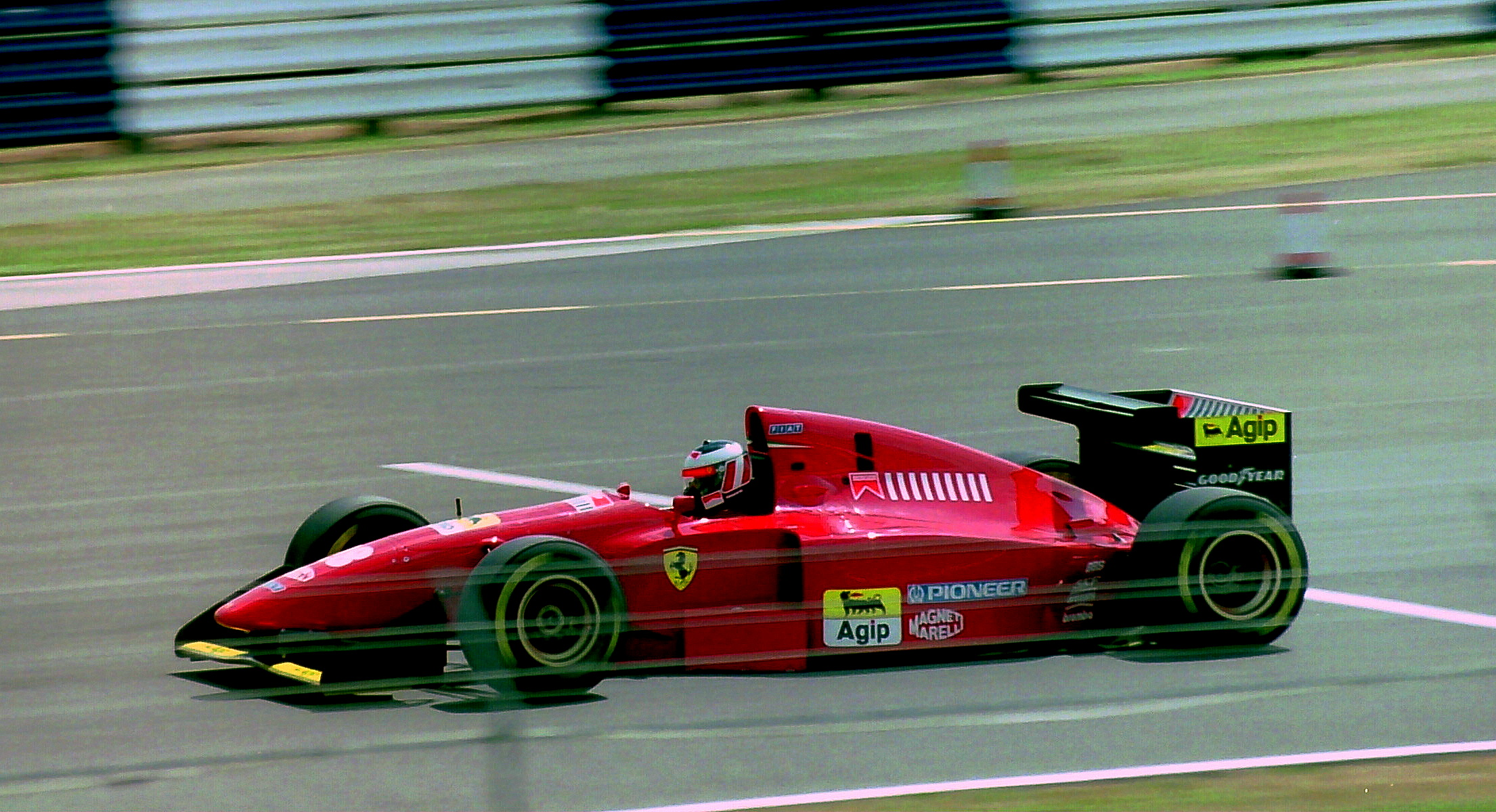
Ferrari placed third with the Ferrari 412 T1.

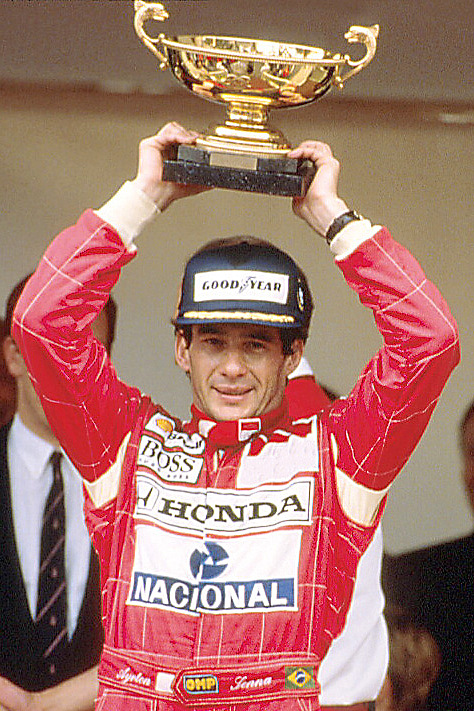
The season was overshadowed by the fatal accidents suffered by Roland Ratzenberger and Ayrton Senna (pictured in 1992) at the San Marino Grand Prix.

The 1994 FIA Formula One World Championship was the 48th season of FIA Formula One motor racing. It featured the 1994 Formula One World Championship for Drivers and the 1994 Formula One World Championship for Constructors, which were contested concurrently over a sixteen-race series that commenced on 27 March and ended on 13 November.

Michael Schumacher won his first Drivers' Championship driving for Benetton. As of 2026, he is the last Ford-powered Drivers' Champion. Williams-Renault won their third consecutive Constructors' Championship, the seventh in all for Williams.

1994 was one of the most tragic and controversial seasons in the sport's history. The San Marino Grand Prix saw the deaths of Austrian rookie Roland Ratzenberger and Brazilian three-time World Champion Ayrton Senna, while a number of other incidents throughout the season resulted in injuries to drivers, mechanics, spectators and a track marshal. The FIA subsequently made sweeping changes to the rules and regulations of F1 in an effort to improve safety. The 1994 season would be the last Formula One season to see a fatality caused by an accident until the 2014 season when Jules Bianchi died as a result of his injuries following an accident at the 2014 Japanese Grand Prix. Senna's former seat at Williams would be shared between the team's young test driver David Coulthard, who drove in 8 races during the season, and 1992 drivers' champion Nigel Mansell, whose availability was limited due to his contractual obligations to Newman-Haas Racing in the 1994 Indy Car World Series season in the United States.

1994 was also marked by a fierce title battle between Schumacher and Damon Hill, who became the lead Williams driver following Senna's death. While Schumacher initially dominated, he suffered from a two-race suspension as a result of a disqualification from the British Grand Prix as well as losing a win at the Belgian Grand Prix. This allowed Hill to close the gap significantly in the latter part of the season until he and Schumacher were separated by only one point going into the season-ending Australian Grand Prix. In that race, the title fight concluded in a highly controversial collision between the two rivals, resulting in both drivers retiring and the title being handed to Schumacher, his first of seven world championship titles.

The 1993 champion Alain Prost did not attempt to defend his title, having retired from the sport. 1994 was also the final season for the original Team Lotus, one of the most successful constructors in Formula One history. A total of 46 drivers took part in this season, with 14 making their F1 debut, including numerous pay drivers, with all except Andrea Montermini making at least one race start. Mercedes-Benz returned to the sport for the first time since 1955, as an engine supplier to Swiss team Sauber. The season also saw the first win for Ferrari since 1990, whilst McLaren, following the departure of Senna, endured their first winless season since 1980. This season was the last year of the 3.5 litre engine Formula One which had started 1989 following the ban on turbocharged engines at the end of 1988. For 1995 engine capacity would be reduced to 3 litres for safety reasons.

As of 2026, it was also the last season in which no Mercedes-Benz-engined car scored a podium finish.

== Drivers and constructors ==
The following teams and drivers competed in the 1994 FIA Formula One World Championship. All teams competed with tyres supplied by Goodyear.

Entrant	Constructor	Chassis	Engine	No	Driver	Rounds
(United Kingdom) Rothmans Williams Renault	Williams-Renault	FW16; FW16B	Renault RS6 3.5 V10	0 (Note: With the retirement of reigning champion Alain Prost, car number 1 was not assigned; Damon Hill ran with number 0.)	(United Kingdom) Damon Hill	All
(United Kingdom) Rothmans Williams Renault	Williams-Renault	FW16; FW16B	Renault RS6 3.5 V10	2	(Brazil) Ayrton Senna	1–3
(United Kingdom) Rothmans Williams Renault	Williams-Renault	FW16; FW16B	Renault RS6 3.5 V10	2	(United Kingdom) David Coulthard	5–6, 8–13
(United Kingdom) Rothmans Williams Renault	Williams-Renault	FW16; FW16B	Renault RS6 3.5 V10	2	(United Kingdom) Nigel Mansell	7, 14–16
(United Kingdom) Tyrrell	Tyrrell-Yamaha	022	Yamaha OX10B 3.5 V10	3	(Japan) Ukyo Katayama	All
(United Kingdom) Tyrrell	Tyrrell-Yamaha	022	Yamaha OX10B 3.5 V10	4	(United Kingdom) Mark Blundell	All
(United Kingdom) Mild Seven Benetton Ford	Benetton-Ford	B194	Ford EC Zetec-R 3.5 V8	5	(Germany) Michael Schumacher	1–11, 14–16
(United Kingdom) Mild Seven Benetton Ford	Benetton-Ford	B194	Ford EC Zetec-R 3.5 V8	5	(Finland) JJ Lehto	12–13
(United Kingdom) Mild Seven Benetton Ford	Benetton-Ford	B194	Ford EC Zetec-R 3.5 V8	6	(Netherlands) Jos Verstappen	1–2, 7–14
(United Kingdom) Mild Seven Benetton Ford	Benetton-Ford	B194	Ford EC Zetec-R 3.5 V8	6	(Finland) JJ Lehto	3–6
(United Kingdom) Mild Seven Benetton Ford	Benetton-Ford	B194	Ford EC Zetec-R 3.5 V8	6	(United Kingdom) Johnny Herbert	15–16
(United Kingdom) Marlboro McLaren Peugeot	McLaren-Peugeot	MP4/9	Peugeot A6 3.5 V10	7	(Finland) Mika Häkkinen	1–9, 11–16
(United Kingdom) Marlboro McLaren Peugeot	McLaren-Peugeot	MP4/9	Peugeot A6 3.5 V10	7	(France) Philippe Alliot	10
(United Kingdom) Marlboro McLaren Peugeot	McLaren-Peugeot	MP4/9	Peugeot A6 3.5 V10	8	(United Kingdom) Martin Brundle	All
(United Kingdom) Footwork Ford	Footwork-Ford	FA15	Ford HBE7 / Ford HBE8 3.5 V8	9	(Brazil) Christian Fittipaldi	All
(United Kingdom) Footwork Ford	Footwork-Ford	FA15	Ford HBE7 / Ford HBE8 3.5 V8	10	(Italy) Gianni Morbidelli	All
(United Kingdom) Team Lotus	Lotus-Mugen-Honda	107C; 109	Mugen Honda MF-351HC 3.5 V10; Mugen Honda MF-351HD 3.5 V10	11	(Portugal) Pedro Lamy	1–4
(United Kingdom) Team Lotus	Lotus-Mugen-Honda	107C; 109	Mugen Honda MF-351HC 3.5 V10; Mugen Honda MF-351HD 3.5 V10	11	(Italy) Alessandro Zanardi	5–10, 12
(United Kingdom) Team Lotus	Lotus-Mugen-Honda	107C; 109	Mugen Honda MF-351HC 3.5 V10; Mugen Honda MF-351HD 3.5 V10	11	(Belgium) Philippe Adams	11, 13
(United Kingdom) Team Lotus	Lotus-Mugen-Honda	107C; 109	Mugen Honda MF-351HC 3.5 V10; Mugen Honda MF-351HD 3.5 V10	11	(France) Éric Bernard	14
(United Kingdom) Team Lotus	Lotus-Mugen-Honda	107C; 109	Mugen Honda MF-351HC 3.5 V10; Mugen Honda MF-351HD 3.5 V10	11	(Finland) Mika Salo	15–16
(United Kingdom) Team Lotus	Lotus-Mugen-Honda	107C; 109	Mugen Honda MF-351HC 3.5 V10; Mugen Honda MF-351HD 3.5 V10	12	(United Kingdom) Johnny Herbert	1–13
(United Kingdom) Team Lotus	Lotus-Mugen-Honda	107C; 109	Mugen Honda MF-351HC 3.5 V10; Mugen Honda MF-351HD 3.5 V10	12	(Italy) Alessandro Zanardi	14–16
(Republic of Ireland) Sasol Jordan	Jordan-Hart	194	Hart 1035 3.5 V10	14	(Brazil) Rubens Barrichello	All
(Republic of Ireland) Sasol Jordan	Jordan-Hart	194	Hart 1035 3.5 V10	15	(United Kingdom) Eddie Irvine	1, 5–16
(Republic of Ireland) Sasol Jordan	Jordan-Hart	194	Hart 1035 3.5 V10	15	(Japan) Aguri Suzuki	2
(Republic of Ireland) Sasol Jordan	Jordan-Hart	194	Hart 1035 3.5 V10	15	(Italy) Andrea de Cesaris	3–4
(France) Tourtel Larrousse F1	Larrousse-Ford	LH94	Ford HBF7 / Ford HBF8 3.5 V8	19	(Monaco) Olivier Beretta	1–10
(France) Tourtel Larrousse F1	Larrousse-Ford	LH94	Ford HBF7 / Ford HBF8 3.5 V8	19	(France) Philippe Alliot	11
(France) Tourtel Larrousse F1	Larrousse-Ford	LH94	Ford HBF7 / Ford HBF8 3.5 V8	19	(France) Yannick Dalmas	12–13
(France) Tourtel Larrousse F1	Larrousse-Ford	LH94	Ford HBF7 / Ford HBF8 3.5 V8	19	(Japan) Hideki Noda	14–16
(France) Tourtel Larrousse F1	Larrousse-Ford	LH94	Ford HBF7 / Ford HBF8 3.5 V8	20	(France) Érik Comas	1–15
(France) Tourtel Larrousse F1	Larrousse-Ford	LH94	Ford HBF7 / Ford HBF8 3.5 V8	20	(Switzerland) Jean-Denis Delétraz	16
(Italy) Minardi Scuderia Italia	Minardi-Ford	M193B; M194	Ford HBC7 / Ford HBC8 3.5 V8	23	(Italy) Pierluigi Martini	All
(Italy) Minardi Scuderia Italia	Minardi-Ford	M193B; M194	Ford HBC7 / Ford HBC8 3.5 V8	24	(Italy) Michele Alboreto	All
(France) Ligier Gitanes Blondes	Ligier-Renault	JS39B	Renault RS6 3.5 V10	25	(France) Éric Bernard	1–13
(France) Ligier Gitanes Blondes	Ligier-Renault	JS39B	Renault RS6 3.5 V10	25	(United Kingdom) Johnny Herbert	14
(France) Ligier Gitanes Blondes	Ligier-Renault	JS39B	Renault RS6 3.5 V10	25	(France) Franck Lagorce	15–16
(France) Ligier Gitanes Blondes	Ligier-Renault	JS39B	Renault RS6 3.5 V10	26	(France) Olivier Panis	All
(Italy) Scuderia Ferrari	Ferrari	412T1; 412T1B	Ferrari Tipo 041 3.5 V12; Ferrari Tipo 043 3.5 V12	27	(France) Jean Alesi	1, 4–16
(Italy) Scuderia Ferrari	Ferrari	412T1; 412T1B	Ferrari Tipo 041 3.5 V12; Ferrari Tipo 043 3.5 V12	27	(Italy) Nicola Larini	2–3
(Italy) Scuderia Ferrari	Ferrari	412T1; 412T1B	Ferrari Tipo 041 3.5 V12; Ferrari Tipo 043 3.5 V12	28	(Austria) Gerhard Berger	All
(Switzerland) Broker Sauber Mercedes (Switzerland) Sauber Mercedes	Sauber-Mercedes	C13	Mercedes-Benz 2175B 3.5 V10	29	(Austria) Karl Wendlinger	1–4
(Switzerland) Broker Sauber Mercedes (Switzerland) Sauber Mercedes	Sauber-Mercedes	C13	Mercedes-Benz 2175B 3.5 V10	29	(Italy) Andrea de Cesaris	6–14
(Switzerland) Broker Sauber Mercedes (Switzerland) Sauber Mercedes	Sauber-Mercedes	C13	Mercedes-Benz 2175B 3.5 V10	29	(Finland) JJ Lehto	15–16
(Switzerland) Broker Sauber Mercedes (Switzerland) Sauber Mercedes	Sauber-Mercedes	C13	Mercedes-Benz 2175B 3.5 V10	30	(Germany) Heinz-Harald Frentzen (Note: Heinz-Harald Frentzen was entered into the Monaco Grand Prix, but later withdrew following the accident of teammate Karl Wendlinger in free practice.)	All
(United Kingdom) MTV Simtek Ford	Simtek-Ford	S941	Ford HBD6 3.5 V8	31	(Australia) David Brabham	All
(United Kingdom) MTV Simtek Ford	Simtek-Ford	S941	Ford HBD6 3.5 V8	32	(Austria) Roland Ratzenberger	1–3
(United Kingdom) MTV Simtek Ford	Simtek-Ford	S941	Ford HBD6 3.5 V8	32	(Italy) Andrea Montermini	5
(United Kingdom) MTV Simtek Ford	Simtek-Ford	S941	Ford HBD6 3.5 V8	32	(France) Jean-Marc Gounon	7–13
(United Kingdom) MTV Simtek Ford	Simtek-Ford	S941	Ford HBD6 3.5 V8	32	(Italy) Domenico Schiattarella	14, 16
(United Kingdom) MTV Simtek Ford	Simtek-Ford	S941	Ford HBD6 3.5 V8	32	(Japan) Taki Inoue	15
(United Kingdom) Pacific Grand Prix	Pacific-Ilmor	PR01	Ilmor 2175A 3.5 V10	33	(France) Paul Belmondo	All
(United Kingdom) Pacific Grand Prix	Pacific-Ilmor	PR01	Ilmor 2175A 3.5 V10	34	(France) Bertrand Gachot	All

=== Team changes ===
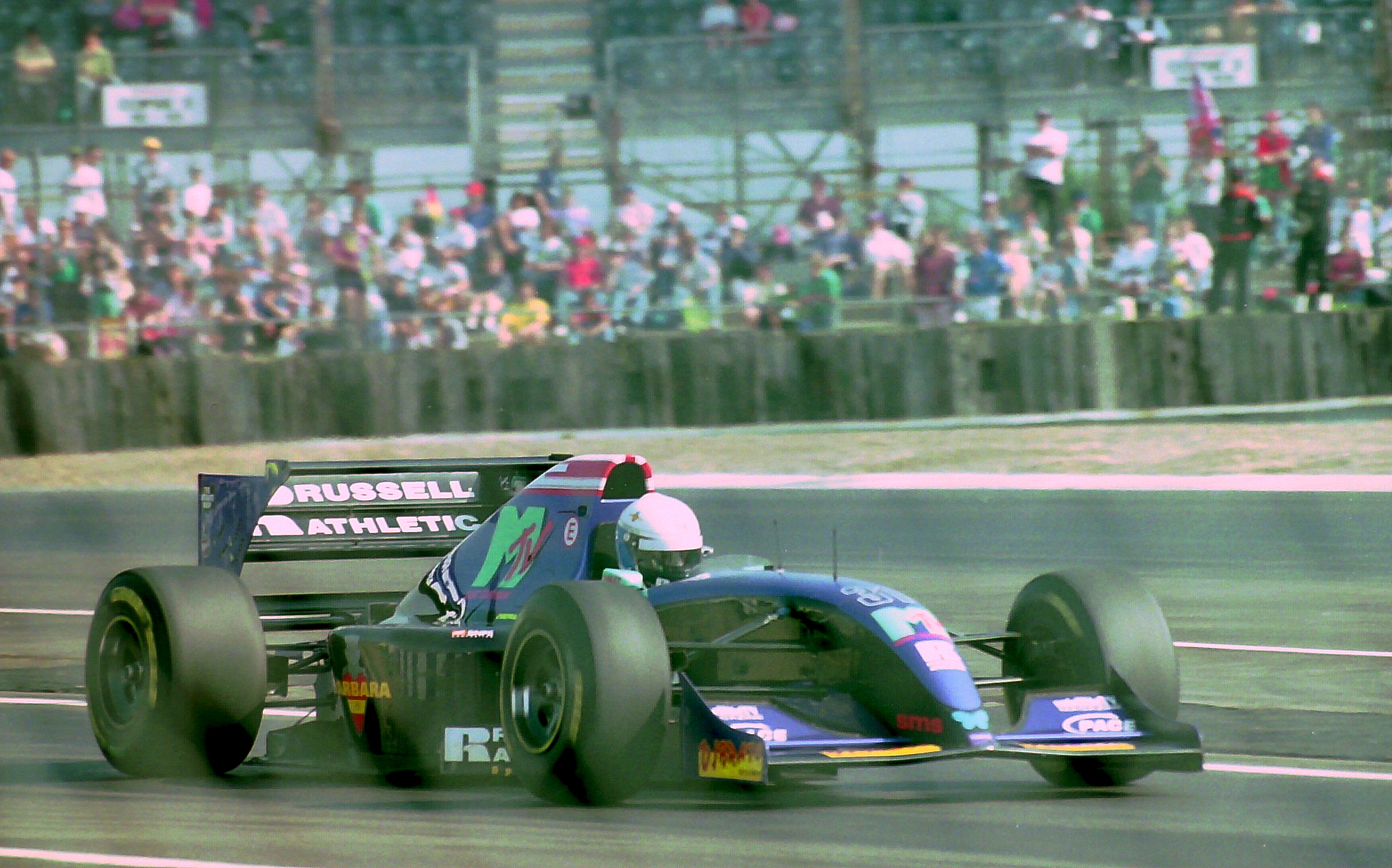
David Brabham driving for the new team Simtek during the British GP

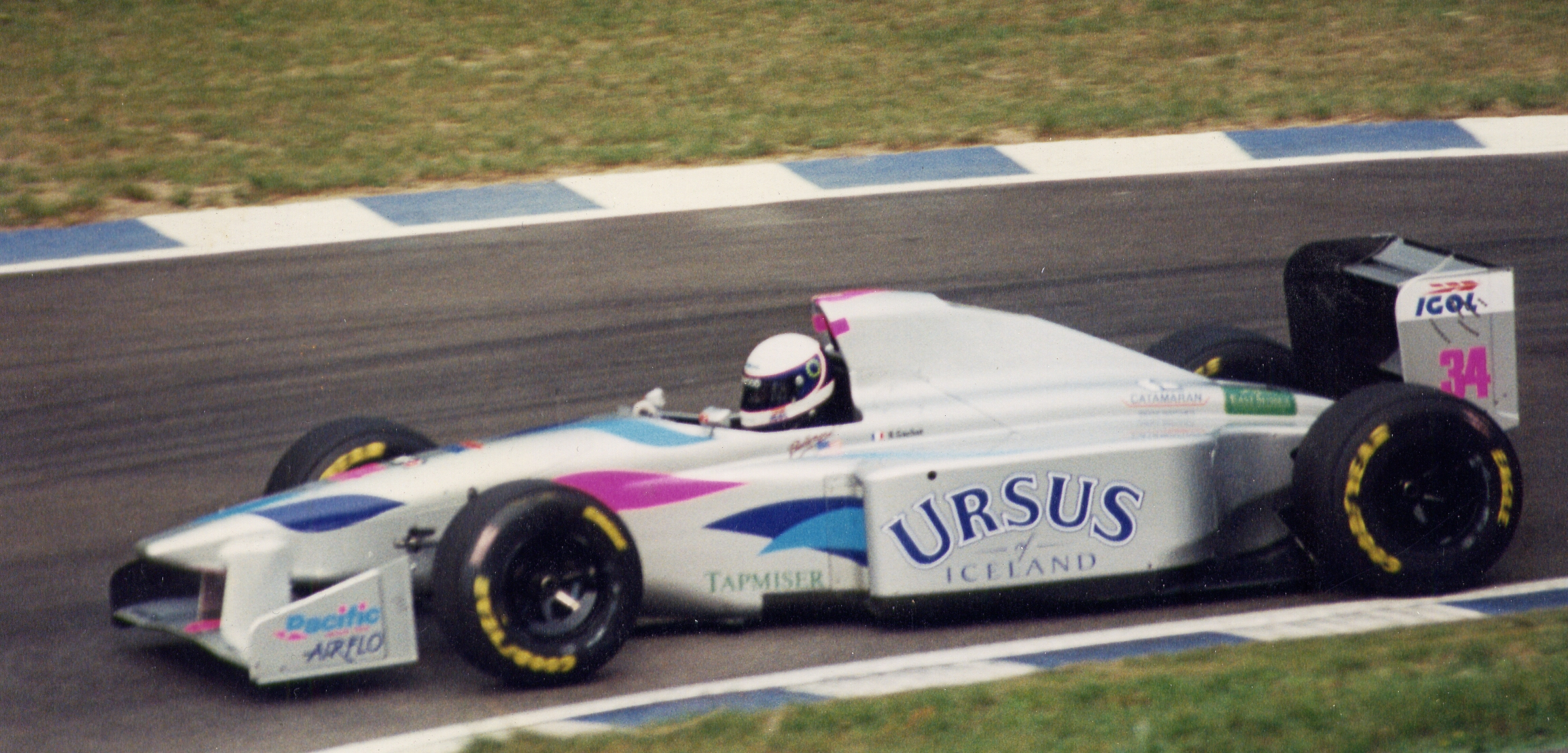
Bertrand Gachot in the new Pacific PR01 at the Hockenheimring

- The Lola team (fully known as Lola BMS Scuderia Italia) had folded two races before the end of the 1993 season. Part of the assets were taken over by the Minardi team, leaving the name Lola behind and forming Minardi Scuderia Italia.
- Following a year with customer Ford V8 power and a brief flirtation testing the Lamborghini V12 engine, McLaren settled on works Peugeot V10 engines for 1994.
- Lotus obtained an engine deal with Mugen-Honda, making it their first time running Honda power since 1988.
- Footwork, running with Mugen Honda engines in 1993 took over the Ford contract.
- Fulfulling their role of Sauber's technical partner, Mercedes-Benz further developed the 1993 Ilmor V10 and officially entered F1 for the first time since 1955.
- Larrousse had collaborated with Lamborghini in 1993, but joined Footwork in using Ford engines. Lamborghini left the sport when the deal with McLaren fell through.
- Two new teams were welcomed onto the grid: Simtek and Pacific Racing.

=== Driver changes ===
- After winning his fourth and final Drivers' Championship in 1993, Alain Prost decided not to defend his title in 1994 despite testing for McLaren before the season began. Williams attracted three-time champion Ayrton Senna. Senna's seat at McLaren was given to Martin Brundle.
- Sauber replaced JJ Lehto with debutant Heinz-Harald Frentzen, the Finn finding a new home at Benetton, from where Riccardo Patrese had retired. However, he injured his neck in pre-season testing and Jos Verstappen, father of future four-time champion Max Verstappen, stepped up. Lehto ended up competing in just six races.
- Mark Blundell was hired by Tyrrell. Ex-driver Andrea de Cesaris acted as reserve driver at Jordan and Sauber in 1994.
- With Ligier losing both 1993 drivers to other teams, they started 1994 with Éric Bernard, returning to F1 after two years, and 1993 F3000 champion Olivier Panis.
- Minardi hired Michele Alboreto, after he had competed for the Benetton seat, instead of Jean-Marc Gounon, the Frenchman moving to Simtek on a part-time contract.
- Derek Warwick and Aguri Suzuki were let go by Footwork in favour of Christian Fittipaldi, 1993 Minardi driver, and Gianni Morbidelli, 1992 Minardi driver.
- Larrousse replaced Toshio Suzuki with Olivier Beretta, coming out of Formula 3000.
- Simtek entered the season with David Brabham, last seen in F1 in 1990, and F3000 driver Roland Ratzenberger, while Pacific hired Paul Belmondo, returning after his drive for March in 1992, and Bertrand Gachot, for his fifth season in F1.

==== Mid-season changes ====
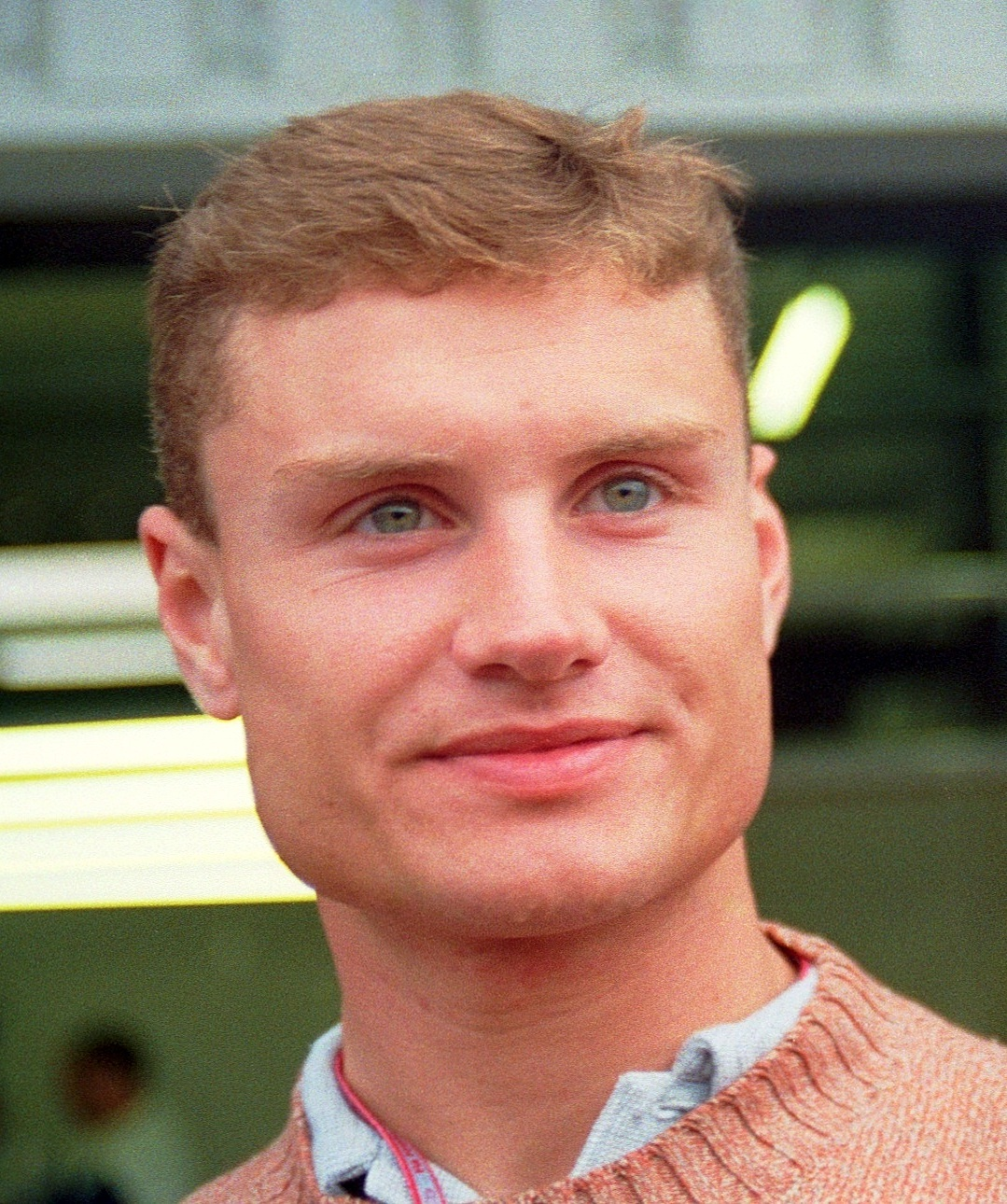
David Coulthard (pictured in 1995) made his debut at the Spanish Grand Prix.

- Ayrton Senna fatally crashed during the San Marino Grand Prix, the third race of the season. Williams entered the next race with one car, before test driver David Coulthard made his debut in Spain. He shared his position with 1992 champion Nigel Mansell.
- Benetton test driver Jos Verstappen took the racing seat when driver JJ Lehto injured his neck during pre-season testing. After sitting out two races, Lehto was deemed fit enough to return. However, his performances disappointed, and the Dutchman was called back. He competed in eight races, until he was replaced with Lotus driver Johnny Herbert for the remaining two Grands Prix (see below). Lehto did enter two more races with the team, when Michael Schumacher was disqualified from the British Grand Prix and handed a two-race ban, and finished the season at Sauber.
- Ferrari driver Jean Alesi injured his back during private testing at Mugello Circuit and was replaced by test driver Nicola Larini.
- Jordan driver Eddie Irvine was involved in a four-car crash, for which he received a one-race ban. He was replaced by ex-Footwork driver Aguri Suzuki. Irvine appealed to the FIA against the decision, but his plea was rejected and the penalty was increased to a three-race ban. His seat was filled by Aguri Suzuki for the following Pacific Grand Prix, and Andrea de Cesaris for the races in San Marino and Monaco. Andrea de Cesaris stepped in, having previously raced for the team in 1991.
- Sauber driver Karl Wendlinger crashed during the first practice session of the Monaco Grand Prix and remained in a coma for several weeks. He did not return for the rest of the season. His seat was filled by De Cesaris, after driving for Jordan, and JJ Lehto, released from his contract at Benetton.
- Lotus driver Pedro Lamy suffered a heavy crash in a private test session at Silverstone, breaking both legs and wrists. He was replaced with test driver Alessandro Zanardi. Pay driver Philippe Adams also drove two races. With three races to go in the season, their other driver, Johnny Herbert, and Ligier driver Éric Bernard switched teams. However, Bernard was let go after one race in favour of Mika Salo, who had actually never before driven an F1 car. After one race with Ligier, Herbert was hired by Benetton (the two teams had close ties in that time), in anticipation of a full-time drive in 1995.
- After employing Éric Bernard and Johnny Herbert, Ligier let test driver Franck Lagorce compete in the final two races of the season.
- 1993 Larrousse driver Philippe Alliot was test driver for McLaren in 1994 and filled in for Mika Häkkinen who had received a one-race ban for causing the crash on the first lap of the German Grand Prix. Alliot was loaned to his former employer for one race when Olivier Beretta's sponsorship money ran out and he left the team.
- After temporarily needing Alliot's services, Larrousse hired Yannick Dalmas, returning to F1 since 1990, and F3000 driver Hideki Noda. Pay driver Jean-Denis Delétraz bought one race entry instead of the other Larrousse driver Érik Comas.
- Andrea Montermini debuted for Simtek after the death of Roland Ratzenberger. However, he crashed in his first practice session and broke his left heel and right foot. The seat was filled by ex-Minardi driver Jean-Marc Gounon, pay driver Domenico Schiattarella and F3000 driver Taki Inoue.

== Calendar ==
Round	Grand Prix	Circuit	Date
1	Brazilian Grand Prix	(Brazil) Autódromo José Carlos Pace, São Paulo	27 March
2	Pacific Grand Prix	(Japan) TI Circuit, Aida	17 April
3	San Marino Grand Prix	(Italy) Autodromo Enzo e Dino Ferrari, Imola	1 May
4	Monaco Grand Prix	Circuit de Monaco, Monte Carlo	15 May
5	Spanish Grand Prix	(Spain) Circuit de Barcelona-Catalunya, Montmeló	29 May
6	Canadian Grand Prix	(Canada) Circuit Gilles Villeneuve, Montreal	12 June
7	French Grand Prix	(France) Circuit de Nevers Magny-Cours, Magny-Cours	3 July
8	British Grand Prix	(United Kingdom) Silverstone Circuit, Silverstone	10 July
9	German Grand Prix	(Germany) Hockenheimring, Hockenheim	31 July
10	Hungarian Grand Prix	(Hungary) Hungaroring, Mogyoród	14 August
11	Belgian Grand Prix	(Belgium) Circuit de Spa-Francorchamps, Stavelot	28 August
12	Italian Grand Prix	(Italy) Autodromo Nazionale di Monza, Monza	11 September
13	Portuguese Grand Prix	(Portugal) Autódromo do Estoril, Estoril	25 September
14	European Grand Prix	(Spain) Circuito Permanente de Jerez, Jerez de la Frontera	16 October (Note: The European Grand Prix was originally to be held at Donington Park on 17 April but was cancelled, it later reappeared on the 1994 calendar, on the date of 16 October as a replacement for the Argentine Grand Prix.)
15	Japanese Grand Prix	(Japan) Suzuka Circuit, Suzuka	6 November
16	Australian Grand Prix	(Australia) Adelaide Street Circuit, Adelaide	13 November

The following rounds were included on the provisional calendars but were cancelled:

Grand Prix	Circuit	Original date
Argentine Grand Prix	(Argentina) Autódromo Juan y Oscar Gálvez, Buenos Aires	16 October

=== Calendar changes ===
The South African Grand Prix was dropped months after the Kyalami circuit was sold to the South African Automobile Association in July 1993 which found running a Formula One event proved too costly.

The European Grand Prix, originally scheduled for 17 April at Donington Park was cancelled and replaced by the Pacific Grand Prix which hosted its first Grand Prix in 1994. The race was held at the TI Circuit in Japan.

The Spanish Grand Prix and Monaco Grand Prix swapped places on the calendar so that the Spanish round follows the Monaco Grand Prix.

The Argentine Grand Prix had been originally scheduled for 16 October, but was cancelled on 1 June as the Autódromo Oscar Alfredo Gálvez track, which was being modernized since 1991, was still undergoing work and the owners were not finished with the project.

The European Grand Prix reappeared on the calendar as a replacement for the cancelled Argentine Grand Prix with the race being held on 16 October, the race was held at Circuito Permanente de Jerez. It was the first time since 1990 that a F1 race was held at Jerez.

== Regulation changes ==
=== Technical regulations ===
==== Pre-season changes ====
In order to combat the spiraling costs of running a Formula One team, and to counteract criticism that over-reliance on technology was reducing the drivers to a secondary role, sweeping rule changes were introduced for 1994, most notably a ban on all electronic "driver aids", such as:

- Active suspension
- Anti-lock brakes
- Traction control
- Launch control

Four-wheel steering was also banned. Ayrton Senna was among several observers who said that, with such features removed but no attempt to curtail the speed of the cars, 1994 would be "a season with a lot of accidents"; ironically, Senna had been a proponent of the ban on electronic driver aids.

1994 also saw the reintroduction of refuelling during the race for the first time since 1983.

Finally, each gearbox should have four to seven gear ratios.

==== Mid-season changes ====
After the fatal crashes at Imola, several rule changes were introduced to slow the cars down:

- In Spain, front wing endplates and rear diffusers were reduced in size.
- For the following race in Canada, the effectiveness of the airbox was reduced by means of holes cut into the engine cover, resulting in less power.
- From Germany onward, a 10 millimetres (0.39 in) thick skid block made of impregnated wood was affixed to the underside of every car and was permitted to wear by up to only 1 millimetre (0.039 in). This was done to force an increase in ride height and thus reduce ground effect advantages. From this race on, as well, the rear wing could not extend forward of the rear wheel centreline and rear wing elements could only occupy 70% of the space between 60 centimetres (24 in) and 95 centimetres (37 in) above the ground. Finally, the placement of the front wing was now set to at least 40 millimetres (1.6 in) above the "reference plane" (the flat bottom of the car), up from 25 millimetres (0.98 in).

Furthermore, extra safety checks were implemented:

- More stringent fire extinguisher regulations
- Minimum thickness of the headrest was set at 75 millimetres (3.0 in)
- The minimum load that the monocoque had to be able to withstand was raised from 20 kN to 30 kN.

=== Sporting and event regulations ===
- The pit lane speed limit was raised to 80 km/h (50 mph) in practice and 120 km/h (75 mph) in the race.

==== Mid-season changes ====
- After the fatal crashes at Imola, 27 corners on tracks where F1 would race later in the year were identified as bringing a "very high risk" of accidents. 15 of them, including the famous Eau Rouge were bypassed or slowed down (usually with the use of temporary chicanes made of tyre walls or cones).
- After the fire in the Benetton pit box during the German Grand Prix, a fire shield was made obligatory on all circuits, to act as a shield for spectators watching from the upper floors of pit buildings.

== Race-by-race ==
=== Race 1: Brazil ===
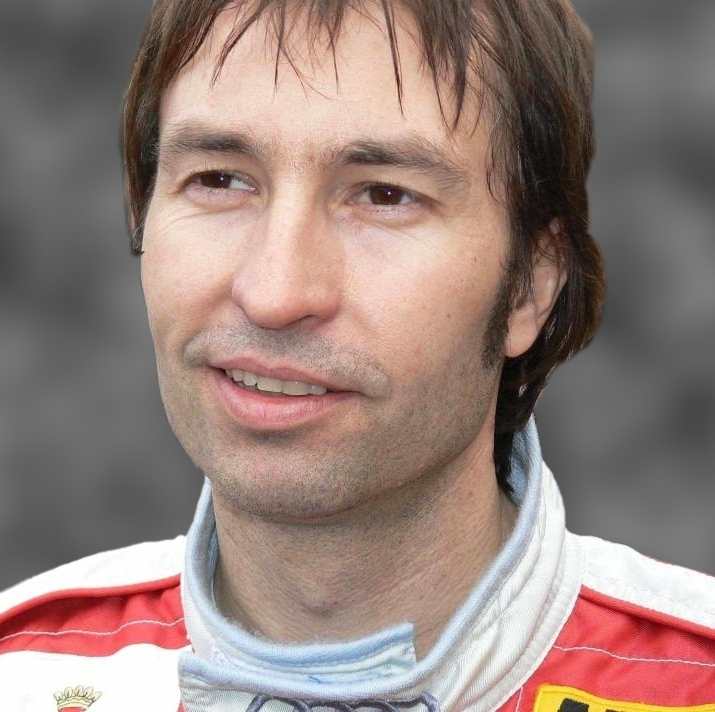
Heinz-Harald Frentzen made his debut for Sauber.

The season started off in Brazil and all the native fans were supporting Senna. It was no surprise that Senna took pole ahead of Schumacher, Alesi, Hill, Frentzen and Gianni Morbidelli. At the start, Alesi took second from Schumacher while Wendlinger and Verstappen, who was driving in place of Lehto who had suffered a neck injury in testing, got ahead of Frentzen and Morbidelli. At the end of lap 1 Senna was leading Alesi, Schumacher, Hill, Wendlinger and Verstappen.

On lap 2, Schumacher took second from Alesi after a couple of unsuccessful earlier attempts. The Frenchman had been holding Schumacher up while Senna pulled out a 4-second lead. Senna and Schumacher pulled away from the rest of the pack, increasing their lead by over a second a lap. Both pitted on lap 21 but Schumacher was quicker and rejoined ahead. He pulled away to take a 10-second lead but then Senna began to reel him in. By lap 35, Verstappen, Brundle and Eddie Irvine had all got ahead of Wendlinger. As they came up to lap Éric Bernard, Verstappen tried to pass Irvine. Irvine pushed him onto the grass and Verstappen spun off, going over Irvine and tipping it into Bernard's car and then hitting Brundle, being launched into a series of barrel rolls. No-one was hurt, but Irvine was banned initially for one race, later extended to three races by the FIA after an unsuccessful appeal. By now, Alesi, who had stopped twice, was behind Hill who had only stopped once.

There was more action as both Ukyo Katayama and then Rubens Barrichello passed Wendlinger to get into the points. Both then stopped, with Barrichello getting ahead. Senna had reduced the gap to Schumacher to 5 seconds, but then spun off on lap 56, just pushing too hard. He was out, However, even though he retired from the race in Brazil, he finished in 13th place because he was the last driver to retired and had completed more laps than the other drivers who had retired earlier. Schumacher won ahead of Hill, Alesi, Barrichello, Katayama and Wendlinger.

=== Race 2: Pacific (Japan) ===
Ferrari's Jean Alesi had injured his back in a testing crash at Mugello and was replaced by Nicola Larini who immediately caused controversy when he told the Italian media that he had used the now-banned traction control in practice, though both the team and driver later denied this. Meanwhile, Aguri Suzuki would replace Eddie Irvine for the Jordan team. Round 2 was at the new Tanaka International circuit in Japan and Senna took pole ahead of Schumacher, Hill, Häkkinen, Berger, and Brundle. At the start, Schumacher got ahead of Senna and Häkkinen got past Hill. Häkkinen tried to attack Senna but ran into the back of him. Senna spun and was hit by Larini, taking both out. Schumacher finished the lap leading Häkkinen, Hill, Berger, Barrichello, and Brundle.

Hill was frustrated at seeing Schumacher pull away and attacked Häkkinen on lap 4. Hill messed up, spun, and dropped back to ninth. He charged back up, passing Brundle on lap 12. It was time for the pit stops during which Hill got ahead of Barrichello. Häkkinen retired when his gearbox failed on lap 19.

While Schumacher pulled away, Hill closed in on Berger. During the second round of pit stops, Hill got by Berger and Brundle got by Barrichello. However, Hill retired on lap 50 when his transmission failed and Brundle also went out on lap 68 when his engine overheated. Schumacher made it two wins out of two ahead of Berger, Barrichello, Christian Fittipaldi, Frentzen, and Érik Comas.

=== Race 3: San Marino ===
Lehto was back for the San Marino Grand Prix and Andrea de Cesaris would be the second driver at Jordan. However, the weekend got off to a bad start as Rubens Barrichello had a major crash during practice and was knocked unconscious. Coming too fast into Variante Bassa, his car was launched into the air by the kerb. Less than a yard from that kerb was a tyre wall, which almost instantly stopped the car's forward motion. His car was flipped over and landed upside down. Barrichello had swallowed his tongue and his life was only saved by quick action from the medical team. He would be back at the circuit on the Saturday afternoon with a broken nose, bandaged arm and cut lip. Barrichello has never been able to recall anything from the incident.

In qualifying, a front wing flap fell off Roland Ratzenberger's car, causing major suspension damage and worsened aerodynamics. On his next lap the front wing broke off entirely and became lodged underneath the car, causing Ratzenberger to lose control and crash into the wall at the Villeneuve kink at over 180 mph. His Simtek S941 was severely damaged, and he suffered a basal skull fracture caused by the impact and was pronounced dead at Bologna's Maggiore Hospital shortly afterwards.

After qualifying re-commenced, Senna took pole ahead of Schumacher, Berger, Hill, Lehto and Larini. During the race morning's driver meeting, all the drivers were talking about Ratzenberger's crash and were determined to improve safety for drivers, resulting in the inauguration of the Grand Prix Drivers' Association (GPDA). Senna offered to take the role of leader as he was the most senior driver.

At the start of the race, Lehto's Benetton B194 stalled and was hit by Pedro Lamy's Lotus. Debris from the crash, including Lamy's right front tyre, flew into the grandstand and injured four spectators and a policeman. Lamy was unhurt but Lehto received a light arm injury. The safety car—a sports variant of an Opel Vectra whose pace would later be criticized as being inadequate to help maintain the competitors' tyres up to temperature—was called out with Senna leading Schumacher, Berger, Hill, Frentzen and Häkkinen.

The race restarted at the end of lap 5. Senna tried immediately to pull away from Schumacher, whilst Berger in 3rd was already 2.586 seconds behind and Hill in 4th was 5.535 seconds behind. At the start of the 7th lap, Senna lost control, for reasons that are still the subject of controversy, and his car went straight on at Tamburello into an unprotected concrete wall. Telemetry shows he left the track at 310 km/h (190 mph) and was able to slow the car down by braking to 218 km/h (135 mph) in slightly under 2 seconds before hitting the wall. The suspension of the Williams broke on impact, the right front tyre flying backwards and hitting Senna on the head. The car slid to a halt on the circuit, with Senna motionless. From the helicopter pictures, a slight movement of Senna's head gave a hint of hope. Doctor Sid Watkins was on the scene in less than two minutes. Senna was airlifted to hospital but nothing could be done and Senna was pronounced dead later that evening. After the race, a moving detail was revealed when an Austrian flag was found in the Brazilian's cockpit because it is thought Senna had planned to pay tribute to Ratzenberger after the race. The race was immediately stopped after Senna's crash.

During the red flag period, the Larrousse team mistakenly released their driver Erik Comas from the pit lane, and Comas was marshalled to a stop at Tamburello corner. Commentating for Eurosport, former F1 driver John Watson described the Comas incident as the "most ridiculous incident I have seen at any time in my life, that a Grand Prix driver is allowed to exit the pits whilst the race is stopped". At the second restart, German Heinz-Harald Frentzen stopped in the Sauber and had to start from the pit lane.

When it restarted, Berger took the lead on track but Schumacher (who collided with Damon Hill, forcing the Briton in the Williams to stop for a new front wing) was still leading in the aggregate standings, with Berger, Häkkinen, Larini, Wendlinger and Katayama following. On the 12th Lap in total, Schumacher did take the lead on the circuit from Berger, but pitted immediately afterwards. When Berger stopped on lap 15, Häkkinen took the lead for McLaren. Berger retired on lap 17 with a suspension failure, whilst Häkkinen pitted a bit later, rejoining fourth. On Lap 21, Schumacher led (although driving behind Larini) on aggregate ahead of the Italian with Fittipaldi (who pitted on lap 23) in third, Häkkinen, Frentzen (who pitted a bit shorter as well) and Wendlinger making up the top six. From about lap 45 until lap 55, Damon Hill, Ukyo Katayama and Christian Fittipaldi battled for 5th, 6th and 7th, with first Fittipaldi and then Hill passing the Japanese in the Tyrrell on aggregate, Hill himself passed Fittipaldi on lap 49, only to lose the position two laps later. Fittipaldi did not finish the race; he retired with brake problems on lap 55. Damon Hill gained fifth, but lost it again to Katayama with two laps to go, and only kept a one-second lead over Heinz-Harald Frentzen to score the last point in the San Marino Grand Prix.

Another incident followed when Michele Alboreto's Minardi lost its right rear wheel while exiting the pits. Alboreto had already accelerated to a significant speed, and thus the wheel caused severe injuries to a member of the Ferrari pit crew. Alboreto's car came to a halt just outside the pits. The incident would lead to two major rule changes in Formula One:

- A pit lane speed limit of 120 km/h (75 mph) during the race and 80 km/h (50 mph) during practice and qualifying.
- Pit crews would now have to remain inside their garage until needed.

Both rules would already be imposed at the next race in Monaco and an 80 km/h (50 mph) speed limit is still in effect across all sessions as of the 2024 season (some events, typically those with a narrower pitlane, employ the lower speed limit of 60 km/h (37 mph)).

Schumacher won ahead of Larini, Häkkinen, Wendlinger, Katayama and Hill but there were no celebrations on the podium and all the talk after the race centred on Senna and Ratzenberger.

=== Race 4: Monaco ===
Alesi returned as the mourning F1 field moved to Monaco where there would be more bad news as Wendlinger crashed heavily into the Nouvelle Chicane wall at high speed during the first free practice session. Quick action from the marshals saved his life but he was in a coma for three weeks, and recuperation from his head injuries ruled him out for the remainder of the season. Frentzen's Sauber was withdrawn for the Monaco event in response as a mark of respect. Schumacher took his first ever pole ahead of Häkkinen, Berger, Hill, Alesi and Fittipaldi.

On Friday morning, Niki Lauda announced the reformation of Grand Prix Drivers' Association (GPDA). The representatives elected were Niki Lauda, Michael Schumacher, Gerhard Berger and Christian Fittipaldi. Following the tragic accidents during the season the GPDA demanded the FIA improve the safety of Formula 1. The FIA responded quickly and introduced changes to the regulations as follows:

For next race, the Spanish Grand Prix,

- the size of diffusers would be reduced,
- the front wing end plates would be raised,
- the size of the front wing would be reduced.

Combined this would reduce the amount of downforce by about 15%.

For the race after that, the Canadian Grand Prix,

- the lateral protection of the drivers' heads would be improved by increasing the height of the sides of the cockpit,
- the minimum weight of a Formula 1 car would be increased by 25 kg (changed to 15 kg by Canadian GP),
- the front wishbones would be strengthened to reduce the possibility of a front wheel coming loose and striking the driver,
- the cockpit would be lengthened to prevent drivers striking their head on the front of the cockpit,
- the use of pump petrol would be introduced in a change to the fuel regulations,
- the airboxes from the engines would be removed to reduce the airflow to the engines and thus decrease the power available.

At the start, with the first two grid positions left empty and painted with the Brazilian and Austrian flags, out of respect for Senna and Ratzenberger (Williams and Simtek not fielding their second cars for the race), Hill got ahead of Berger and attacked Häkkinen into the first corner. There was contact and both spun off into the escape road and were out. Schumacher was leading ahead of Berger, Alesi, Fittipaldi, Brundle and Katayama. Schumacher pulled away while Brundle used a good strategy during the stops, pitting earlier than the others to get ahead of Fittipaldi and Alesi.

Katayama went out on lap 39 with gearbox failure and sixth place went to his teammate Mark Blundell. However, Blundell's engine failed two laps later, spreading oil across the track. Schumacher slid and nearly hit a wall while Berger went down an escape road and dropped behind Brundle. Fittipaldi retired on lap 48 with a gearbox failure. During the second stops, Andrea de Cesaris was able to get ahead of an exhausted Alesi who was struggling with neck pain. Schumacher won ahead of Brundle, Berger, de Cesaris, Alesi and Michele Alboreto.

Between the Monaco GP and the Spanish GP, Williams announced they had brought David Coulthard in to replace Senna, with Nigel Mansell deputising at those races which did not overlap with his IndyCar commitments. Alessandro Zanardi was also in at Lotus alongside Johnny Herbert as Pedro Lamy had suffered a massive testing accident at Silverstone which resulted in him sustaining two dislocated legs and a broken wrist. He would be out for the majority of the season.

=== Race 5: Spain ===
Eddie Irvine returned to Jordan after serving his 3 race ban. Sauber fielded only one car for Frentzen. A temporary tyre chicane was installed at the "Nissan" corner to reduce speeds before the "La Caixa" hairpin.

In Saturday morning's free practice session Andrea Montermini, who had replaced Ratzenberger in the Simtek, had a huge crash exiting the high-speed final corner. In light of recent events, the paddock breathed a sigh of relief when it was announced Montermini had escaped with only a broken ankle and chipped heel. Schumacher took pole ahead of Hill, Häkkinen, Lehto, Barrichello and Alesi. As Simtek and Sauber both fielded only 1 car for the race (Sauber out of respect for Wendlinger and Simtek because of Montermini's crash), both Pacific cars were able to qualify for the race by default as they did in Monaco.

Beretta's engine failed on the formation lap meaning the Larousse driver failed to start. Meanwhile, at the start, Alesi got ahead of both Barrichello and Lehto with Coulthard getting ahead of Barrichello as well. Schumacher led Hill, Häkkinen, Alesi, Lehto and Coulthard into lap 2. Schumacher pulled away until he began to have gear selection problems and was stuck in fifth gear. During the stops, Schumacher amazingly was able to pull away without stalling. Behind, there was action in the pits as Coulthard stalled and Alesi had troubles, dropping down four places. Schumacher, still in the lead, was struggling and was passed by Hill. During the second round of pit stops, Barrichello spun off near the pit entry and Schumacher was once again able to make a pitstop and not stall the car. Häkkinen was right with him but did not have a chance to attack as his engine failed on lap 49. Lehto took up third, but his engine failed as well five laps later. Brundle took the place, but his transmission failed with six laps to go. Hill won from Schumacher who was a superb second in the circumstances, Blundell, Alesi, Pierluigi Martini and Irvine.

=== Race 6: Canada ===
The new regulations introduced during the Monaco weekend to modify amongst other things the airboxes of the cars were now in effect and were visibly shown as teams had to cut holes in the engine covers. Another temporary chicane was installed prior to the flat-out left-right kink leading to the start-finish straight to slow the cars down. Benetton introduced a revised rear wing assembly and Ferrari had new side pods for their cars. Andrea de Cesaris was back in action, now with Sauber, and celebrated his 200th Grand Prix start.

Qualifying in Canada saw Schumacher on pole ahead of Alesi, Berger, Hill, Coulthard and Barrichello. At the start, Coulthard surprised Hill and Häkkinen got ahead of Barrichello. Schumacher led from Alesi, Berger, Coulthard, Hill and Häkkinen. Hill passed Coulthard on lap 4 but Coulthard retook the place on the outside. Coulthard waved Hill through on lap 9. Hill now set off after Berger, passing him on lap 15.

During the stops, Hill got by Alesi with Häkkinen getting ahead of Coulthard. Häkkinen closed up on Berger but was unable to pass. Although it began to rain on lap 40, still there were no major changes at the top, with the top 6 remaining unaltered. On lap 62, Häkkinen's engine blew up, putting him out. On the last lap, Barrichello and Blundell were fighting for sixth when they collided, with Blundell beached in the gravel trap and Barrichello dropping behind Fittipaldi and Lehto. Fittipaldi was, however, disqualified for an underweight car, giving sixth to Lehto. Schumacher won ahead of Hill, Alesi, Berger, Coulthard and Lehto.

The Canadian GP was the last time in 1994 that the Pacific team qualified for a race. Bertrand Gachot retired after 47 laps with oil pressure problems. For the rest of the season the woefully slow cars would fail to even make the grid.

=== Race 7: France ===
France was the venue for the next Grand Prix and Mansell was going to race for Williams as it would not interfere with his CART racing. Benetton had relegated Lehto to the third driver and given the second seat behind Schumacher to Verstappen. Frenchman Jean-Marc Gounon took the second Simtek seat alongside David Brabham. The Williams team took a 1–2 in qualifying with Hill on pole ahead of Mansell, Schumacher, Alesi, Berger and Irvine. At the start, Schumacher showed class to slice between both Williams to take the lead while Barrichello got ahead of Irvine. Schumacher led ahead of Hill, Mansell, Alesi, Berger and Barrichello.

Schumacher pulled away as usual with Hill unable to keep up. During the stops, Alesi got ahead of Mansell and Berger got by Barrichello. Berger then passed Mansell on lap 24. The order settled down at Schumacher, Hill, Alesi, Berger, Mansell and Barrichello. Alesi soon pitted, dropping to fifth. He then spun on lap 42, and was hit by Barrichello as he tried to rejoin, taking both out.

Mansell was planning only to stop twice and took third when Berger pitted but retired on lap 46 when his transmission failed. Häkkinen, now fourth, retired two laps later with a blown engine. There were no changes in the third round of stops although Katayama spun off from fifth soon after, on lap 54. Schumacher won once again from Hill, Berger, Frentzen, Martini and de Cesaris.

=== Race 8: Great Britain ===
Hill took pole position in front of his home crowd in Britain ahead of Schumacher, Berger, Alesi, Häkkinen and Barrichello. There was controversy as Schumacher passed Hill on the formation lap, not permitted under the regulations, and then let him resume first position before they came back to the grid to form up. The first start was aborted when Coulthard (returning to the Williams team) stalled on the grid and was forced to start from the back. Irvine retired on the second formation lap with engine problems and at the second start, Brundle's engine blew in a ball of fire. At the start, Barrichello was the man on the move, getting by Alesi and Häkkinen. Hill led Schumacher, Berger, Barrichello, Alesi and Häkkinen.

Hill and Schumacher stayed together, separated by two seconds until lap 14, when Schumacher was given a five-second stop-go penalty for passing Hill on the formation lap. The team told him to ignore this as they were appealing the decision. Schumacher stayed out beyond the three laps required to adhere to the penalty, and was then shown the black flag meaning he was excluded from the race and from that point would have to return to the pits and retire. Benetton, however, continued to negotiate and appeal the decision with race officials. Schumacher did return to the pits on lap 26, but only for the five-second stop-go penalty. He re-joined the race in third behind Berger and Hill.

On lap 33, Berger went out with an engine failure. Hill won with Schumacher second, but Schumacher was disqualified for ignoring the black flag and was banned for two races. This meant that Hill kept his win ahead of Alesi, Häkkinen, Barrichello, Coulthard, and Katayama. Häkkinen and Barrichello received a 1 race suspended ban for a collision between the two on the final lap of the race.

Thus, at the halfway stage of the championship, Schumacher was well ahead of the field with 66 points. Hill was a distant second with 39, Alesi third with 19, Berger fourth with 17, Barrichello fifth with 10, Häkkinen sixth with 8, Brundle seventh with 6 and Larini eighth with 6. In the Constructors' Championship, Benetton were comfortably ahead with 67 points, 24 points ahead of Williams with 43. Ferrari were also right there, just a single point behind with 42, with McLaren fourth with 14.

Benetton had appealed against Schumacher's ban and he was able to race while the decision was pending.

=== Race 9: Germany ===
The second half of the season started in Germany but the Schumacher fans went home disappointed as the Ferraris locked out the front row in qualifying. Berger took pole ahead of Alesi, Hill, Schumacher down in fourth, Katayama and Coulthard. At the start Katayama got ahead of Hill and Schumacher and subsequently Schumacher got by Hill. There was mayhem behind as Häkkinen hit Brundle and spun off, taking out Frentzen, Barrichello and Irvine, as well as knocking Coulthard's front wing out of place. Brundle braked to avoid the mess but was hit by Herbert, taking the latter out. Behind, there was a collision between Martini and Alessandro Zanardi, taking out de Cesaris and Alboreto in the process. A total of 10 cars were out by the first corner. Surprisingly, the race was not red-flagged.

On the run down to the first chicane Alesi slowed with an electrical problem and retired in the pits, but also blocked Katayama, allowing both Schumacher and Hill to attack. Schumacher went through but Hill hit Katayama, damaging his front suspension. Coulthard pitted for a new wing and Hill double-stacked behind him to get his suspension checked. Brundle, Coulthard and Hill rejoined after repairs as Berger was leading from Schumacher, Katayama, Olivier Panis, Bernard and Fittipaldi. Katayama retired on lap 7 with throttle troubles as Verstappen passed Fittipaldi. It was time for the stops and Verstappen retired following a fire as fuel spilled onto the bodywork of the car. He managed to escape relatively uninjured but the car was reduced to a smoldering wreck. The incident served to highlight the dangers of refuelling now it had been re-introduced to the sport, and paved the way for future safety measures. Schumacher retired on lap 20 with an engine failure.

With most of the major players out or far down the order after incidents, Berger took an emotional win which he dedicated to his friend Senna. A race of attrition saw some unfamiliar faces in the top six. Both Ligiers of Panis and Bernard finished on the podium, Fittipaldi and Morbidelli collected valuable points for Footwork and Comas picked up the final point for Larrousse.

=== Race 10: Hungary ===
The news before Hungary was that Häkkinen had been banned for one race for causing the pile-up in Germany and was replaced by Philippe Alliot. Schumacher was on pole ahead of Hill, Coulthard, Berger, Katayama and Brundle. At the start Irvine and Barrichello were quick and got ahead of Brundle and Katayama.

However, they collided into the second corner and took off Katayama as well. Schumacher led Hill, Coulthard, Berger, Brundle and Panis. Early on, Alesi passed Panis for sixth. Nothing changed as the order settled down, with the first round of stops leaving the same order. Finally, there was action behind as Berger stalled during the second round of pit stops and dropped behind Brundle, Alesi and Verstappen.

Both Ferrari engines then failed; Alesi's on lap 59 and Berger's on lap 73. Alesi's engine left oil on the track, and Coulthard spun on it into the wall. On the last lap, Brundle stopped with an electrical failure. Schumacher won from Hill, Verstappen, Brundle, Blundell and Panis.

Controversy surrounded Benetton following the Verstappen pit-fire at Hockenheim. The team was summoned to appear before the World Motorsport council on 19 October 1994, to explain why a filter had been removed from the refuelling rig. If found guilty, the team would be excluded from the championship, but they were acquitted. McLaren were also in the dock over the use of a fully automatic upchange device. They were also acquitted.

=== Race 11: Belgium ===
The most notable aspect of this race was the alteration of the Eau Rouge corner into a slow chicane, due to safety fears after the Senna/Ratzenberger accidents. This was achieved simply by painting new boundary lines onto the track, with the original layout restored for 1995.

Häkkinen was back in Belgium after the ban, Philippe Adams replaced Zanardi at Lotus and Philippe Alliot moved from McLaren duties to replace Beretta at Larrousse. Rain in qualifying resulting in a scrambled grid order with Barrichello on pole from Schumacher, Hill, Irvine, Alesi and Verstappen. At the start Alesi was on the move, quickly getting ahead of Irvine and Hill. Schumacher took the lead on the run up the hill with Alesi following him to second soon after and Verstappen then passing Irvine. Schumacher led Alesi, Barrichello, Hill, Verstappen and Irvine.

Hill passed Barrichello for third and this became second when Alesi's engine failed on the next lap. Soon Häkkinen passed Irvine but Coulthard dropped back while trying to follow him through. Barrichello was passed by Verstappen and then Häkkinen attacked him. Barrichello cracked under the pressure and spun off on lap 20 into the wall, ending his race. On the next lap, Schumacher had a 360 degree spin at Pouhon, and his lead was significantly reduced when he rejoined. He kept a five-second lead during the stops in which Häkkinen got ahead of Verstappen.

On lap 35, Coulthard passed Irvine, who then retired on lap 41 with three laps to go, with an alternator failure. Schumacher took the chequered flag, but was disqualified after the race because the wooden stepped flat bottom board on Schumacher's car had been excessively worn away, more than the permitted 10% wear. Hill was reclassified as the winner ahead of Häkkinen, Verstappen, Coulthard, Blundell and Morbidelli.

Schumacher's ban (handed down after the British Grand Prix) stood after appeal and he would miss Italy and Portugal. He was replaced by Lehto.

=== Race 12: Italy ===
Driver swapping continued as Zanardi got his seat back from Adams for Monza and Yannick Dalmas was back after almost 4 years absence, now partnering Comas at Larrousse. In Italy, the Ferrari fans were sent wild as their drivers took another 1–2 in qualifying, Alesi on pole ahead of Berger and Hill. Johnny Herbert qualified an unexpected fourth in the new Lotus 109 and was followed by Coulthard and Panis. At the start, Herbert and Irvine got ahead of the Williams but Irvine hit Herbert and Herbert spun, causing mayhem behind and a red flag. The second start was uneventful with Coulthard getting ahead of Herbert and Häkkinen getting ahead of Panis. Alesi led Berger, Hill, Coulthard, Herbert and Häkkinen.

While the Ferraris pulled away (Alesi pulling away from Berger), Häkkinen passed Herbert (in the spare Lotus, an older car) who retired on lap 13 when his alternator failed. Alesi then pitted but his car refused to engage a gear when he tried to rejoin resulting in his retirement. During Berger's stop, he was blocked by another car which was going into the pit. In his frustration, he accidentally stalled the car exiting his stop and lost over 10 seconds, dropping back to third. Coulthard also got ahead of Hill during the stops, however Hill passed Coulthard on lap 29 to take the lead.

Berger was closing in on them both, however the Williamses held him off and looked set to finish 1–2 until Coulthard slowed dramatically, as he ran out of fuel on the last lap. Hill won from Berger, Häkkinen, Barrichello, Brundle and Coulthard, who was classified sixth.

Eddie Irvine was given a one-race ban, suspended for three races, for his behaviour in the first corner incident at the first start.

With three-quarters of the season gone, Schumacher who had served one race of his two-race ban led the championship with 76 points, but Hill, second with 65 points was just 11 points behind. Berger was third with 33, Alesi fourth with 19, Häkkinen fifth with 18, Barrichello sixth with 13, Brundle seventh with 11 and Verstappen eighth with 8. In the Constructors' Championship, Benetton led with 85 points but Williams were hot on their heels with 73. Ferrari were not too far behind with 58, and McLaren fourth with 29.

=== Race 13: Portugal ===
Schumacher was still banned as the field went to Portugal. Philippe Adams had another go in the financially struggling Lotus. In qualifying, Berger took pole ahead of Hill, Coulthard, Häkkinen, Alesi and Katayama. At the start, Coulthard got ahead of Hill and Alesi was ahead of Häkkinen. Berger was leading Coulthard, Hill, Alesi, Häkkinen, and Katayama. Berger only lasted until lap 8 when his gearbox failed, promoting Barrichello to the points. Just before the stops, Katayama's gearbox also failed, on lap 27.

The stops did not change the order, with Coulthard leading ahead of Hill, Alesi, Häkkinen, Barrichello and Brundle. Coulthard went wide while lapping a backmarker on lap 33, and Hill edged ahead. On lap 39, when Alesi was coming up to lap David Brabham, they collided and both were out. Soon afterwards, Verstappen passed Brundle to take fifth. The second round of stops did not change anything. Hill won with Coulthard second, giving Williams a 1–2 and the lead in the Constructors' Championship, ahead of Häkkinen, Barrichello, Verstappen, and Brundle.

=== Race 14: Europe ===
To the new race in Jerez and there was major news. Schumacher was back after his ban, and with the CART season finished, Mansell replaced Coulthard for the remainder of the season in order to help Williams in the Constructors battle. Johnny Herbert was moved from Lotus to Ligier in place of Eric Bernard, who travelled the opposite way to partner Zanardi. Two new faces arrived at the back of the grid, as Hideki Noda joined Larrousse and Domenico "Mimmo" Schiattarella replaced Jean-Marc Gounon at Simtek. Schumacher took pole ahead of Hill, Mansell, Frentzen, Berger and Barrichello. At the start, Hill took the lead from Schumacher while Mansell went backwards, losing three places with Barrichello getting ahead of Berger. Hill led from Schumacher, Frentzen, Barrichello, Berger and Mansell.

Mansell quickly passed Berger and then Barrichello to get up to fourth. During the stops, Hill messed up and the team, afraid that he would lose the lead, sent him back out too quickly without giving him enough fuel. Schumacher however was already ahead and Hill had to stop again for fuel. When he rejoined, he was over 20 seconds behind. Mansell too was slow and Barrichello was ahead of him. Mansell tried to pass him and there was contact. Both had to pit, with Mansell dropping to seventh and Barrichello going well down.

The result was the same when Berger attacked Frentzen but damage was minor. They rejoined in sixth and seventh, behind Häkkinen, Irvine and Mansell, with Berger ahead. Mansell, now fifth, spun off on lap 48 into retirement while trying to close the gap to Irvine. Schumacher won ahead of Hill, Häkkinen, Irvine, Berger and Frentzen.

With just two more races to go, there was a major battle for the Drivers' Championship. Schumacher led the championship with 86 points, but Hill was right behind with 81. Berger was third with 35, Häkkinen fourth with 26, Alesi fifth with 19, Barrichello sixth with 16, Coulthard seventh with 14 and Brundle eighth with 12. The Constructors' Championship was even closer as Benetton led with 97 points and Williams a mere 2 points behind with 95. Ferrari were third with 60, while McLaren were fourth with 38.

=== Race 15: Japan ===
More driver roulette followed before Japan. Benetton signed up Herbert from Ligier, in order to help them in the Constructors battle. This left Verstappen out of a drive for the last two races. JJ Lehto landed the Sauber seat for the remaining two races, vacated by Andrea de Cesaris who retired from the sport. Finn Mika Salo joined Lotus for the remainder of the season, Frenchman Franck Lagorce was promoted from Ligier test duties to race alongside Panis and Japanese driver Taki Inoue replaced Schiattarella for his home race. Mercedes-Benz ended months of speculation and confirmed their return to Formula 1 as an engine supplier for McLaren. Eddie Jordan immediately picked up a Peugeot works engine deal for his team for 1995.

Schumacher took pole ahead of Hill, Frentzen, Mansell, Herbert and Irvine. At the start the track was wet and it was raining heavily. Mansell went backwards again with Alesi getting ahead of Irvine. Schumacher was leading Hill, Frentzen, Herbert, Alesi and Irvine. Herbert spun off on lap 4 and retired, while Mansell soon passed Irvine.

On lap 14, Morbidelli crashed, and Brundle crashed off shortly after at the same point whilst the marshalls were still dealing with Morbidelli's car. Although no-one was hit by the car, one marshall was hit by debris and suffered a broken leg; the race was stopped. The race restarted after some time behind the Safety Car and Frentzen ran wide into the first corner, dropping down three places. Schumacher, who was just ahead on track but 6 seconds ahead on aggregate pitted early on lap 19. He took on fresh tyres and a fuel load that was insufficient to last to the end of the race. He rejoined 17 seconds behind Hill on aggregate but got caught in traffic and soon the gap was up to 30 seconds before it stabilized. This meant that Hill rejoined 7 seconds ahead on lap 25 when he pitted and fueled to the end of the race, but only 3 of his tyres were changed due to a sticking wheel nut. This, coupled with Hill's heavy fuel load appeared to hinder him and Schumacher began to close in.

On lap 36, Schumacher took the lead on aggregate, though he was still behind on the track. He pulled away rapidly, but he needed to pit again whereas Hill did not. On lap 40 Schumacher made his second stop, rejoining 15 seconds behind Hill on aggregate. Renowned for his ability in the wet and on fresher tyres, Schumacher closed in on Hill at a rate of over a second a lap, but ran out of time to catch him. Hill won by 3.3s to reduce his deficit in the Drivers' Championship to 1 point, as well as giving Williams a 5-point lead in the Constructors' Championship going into the last race, ahead of Schumacher, Alesi, Mansell, Irvine, and Frentzen.

=== Race 16: Australia ===
For the final race of the season Jean-Denis Délétraz replaced Erik Comas at Larrousse and Schiattarella was back with Simtek after Taki Inoue's one-off deal at Suzuka. Peter Sauber confirmed a deal with a Ford engine for 1995.

Both championships were going to be decided in Australia and Mansell took pole ahead of Schumacher, Hill, Häkkinen, Barrichello, and Irvine. At the start, Mansell dropped backwards as was proving usual, with Irvine getting ahead of Barrichello, leaving the front six as Schumacher, Hill, Häkkinen, Irvine, Mansell, and Barrichello. Schumacher and Hill, separated by a second, pulled away at an astonishing rate from the rest of the field.

Mansell took fourth from Irvine on lap 10 and six laps later, Irvine spun off into the wall and retired. It did not take long for Mansell to pass Häkkinen but even then he was lapping over a second slower than Schumacher and Hill. During the stops, Schumacher and Hill stayed just over a second apart, while, behind, Berger got ahead of Alesi and both got ahead of Barrichello. Soon Berger passed Häkkinen, with Alesi following him through three laps later.

On lap 35, Schumacher went wide at the East Terrace corner and brushed the wall. He lost time but at the time, it was unclear whether his car was damaged or not. Hill was suddenly right behind him and saw his chance to pass, taking the inside line into the next corner. As Hill's Williams drew alongside the Benetton, Schumacher appeared to turn in aggressively and there was contact between the two rival cars. The Benetton was then momentarily flung into the air and was damaged badly enough to mean immediate retirement for the German. Hill's car initially appeared to be undamaged but it was soon apparent the Briton's front left wishbone was broken. Hill toured back slowly to the pits and after some time trying to repair the damage, retired. Whether this accident had been deliberately caused by Schumacher – in the knowledge he had damaged his car in running wide at the East Terrace Corner – remains a matter of some debate, however it handed Michael Schumacher the first of his seven FIA Formula One World Championships.

Mansell and the two Ferraris fought for the lead, but Alesi lost a full lap and dropped down to eighth during the second round of stops because of trouble fixing a tyre and then stalling his car while trying to leave. Behind, Brundle got ahead of Barrichello. On lap 77, Häkkinen's brakes failed, sending him into the wall and into retirement. Mansell took his 31st (and final) career win ahead of Berger, Brundle, Barrichello, Panis, and Alesi.

Thus, at the end of the season, Schumacher with 92 points pipped Hill on 91 by just one point. Controversy and speculation was abound about this result, but the FIA took no action as Williams did not protest; they were still dealing with the death of Senna, to whom Schumacher dedicated his title. Berger came third with 41, Häkkinen fourth with 26, Alesi fifth with 24, Barrichello sixth with 19, Brundle seventh with 16, and Coulthard eighth with 14. In the Constructors' Championship, Williams with 118 points beat Benetton with 103. Ferrari were third with 71, and McLaren were fourth with 42.

== Results and standings ==
=== Grands Prix ===
Round	Grand Prix	Pole position	Fastest lap	Winning driver	Winning constructor	Report
1	(Brazil) Brazilian Grand Prix	(Brazil) Ayrton Senna	(Germany) Michael Schumacher	(Germany) Michael Schumacher	(United Kingdom) Benetton-Ford	Report
2	(Japan) Pacific Grand Prix	(Brazil) Ayrton Senna	(Germany) Michael Schumacher	(Germany) Michael Schumacher	(United Kingdom) Benetton-Ford	Report
3	(Italy) San Marino Grand Prix	(Brazil) Ayrton Senna	(United Kingdom) Damon Hill	(Germany) Michael Schumacher	(United Kingdom) Benetton-Ford	Report
4	Monaco Grand Prix	(Germany) Michael Schumacher	(Germany) Michael Schumacher	(Germany) Michael Schumacher	(United Kingdom) Benetton-Ford	Report
5	(Spain) Spanish Grand Prix	(Germany) Michael Schumacher	(Germany) Michael Schumacher	(United Kingdom) Damon Hill	(United Kingdom) Williams-Renault	Report
6	(Canada) Canadian Grand Prix	(Germany) Michael Schumacher	(Germany) Michael Schumacher	(Germany) Michael Schumacher	(United Kingdom) Benetton-Ford	Report
7	(France) French Grand Prix	(United Kingdom) Damon Hill	(United Kingdom) Damon Hill	(Germany) Michael Schumacher	(United Kingdom) Benetton-Ford	Report
8	(United Kingdom) British Grand Prix	(United Kingdom) Damon Hill	(United Kingdom) Damon Hill	(United Kingdom) Damon Hill	(United Kingdom) Williams-Renault	Report
9	(Germany) German Grand Prix	(Austria) Gerhard Berger	(United Kingdom) David Coulthard	(Austria) Gerhard Berger	(Italy) Ferrari	Report
10	(Hungary) Hungarian Grand Prix	(Germany) Michael Schumacher	(Germany) Michael Schumacher	(Germany) Michael Schumacher	(United Kingdom) Benetton-Ford	Report
11	(Belgium) Belgian Grand Prix	(Brazil) Rubens Barrichello	(United Kingdom) Damon Hill	(United Kingdom) Damon Hill (Note: Michael Schumacher originally won the race, but was later disqualified due to excessive skid block wear. Damon Hill, initially classified second, inherited the win.)	(United Kingdom) Williams-Renault	Report
12	(Italy) Italian Grand Prix	(France) Jean Alesi	(United Kingdom) Damon Hill	(United Kingdom) Damon Hill	(United Kingdom) Williams-Renault	Report
13	(Portugal) Portuguese Grand Prix	(Austria) Gerhard Berger	(United Kingdom) David Coulthard	(United Kingdom) Damon Hill	(United Kingdom) Williams-Renault	Report
14	(Spain) European Grand Prix	(Germany) Michael Schumacher	(Germany) Michael Schumacher	(Germany) Michael Schumacher	(United Kingdom) Benetton-Ford	Report
15	(Japan) Japanese Grand Prix	(Germany) Michael Schumacher	(United Kingdom) Damon Hill	(United Kingdom) Damon Hill	(United Kingdom) Williams-Renault	Report
16	(Australia) Australian Grand Prix	(United Kingdom) Nigel Mansell	(Germany) Michael Schumacher	(United Kingdom) Nigel Mansell	(United Kingdom) Williams-Renault	Report

=== Points scoring system ===
Points were awarded to the top six finishers in each race as follows:

Position	1st	2nd	3rd	4th	5th	6th	Ref
Points	10	6	4	3	2	1	

=== World Drivers' Championship standings ===
Pos.	Driver	BRA (Brazil)	PAC (Japan)	SMR (Italy)	MON (Monaco)	ESP (Spain)	CAN (Canada)	FRA (France)	GBR (United Kingdom)	GER (Germany)	HUN (Hungary)	BEL (Belgium)	ITA (Italy)	POR (Portugal)	EUR (Spain)	JPN (Japan)	AUS (Australia)	Points
1	(Germany) Michael Schumacher	1^{F}	1^{F}	1	1^{P}^{F}	2^{P}^{F}	1^{P}^{F}	1	DSQ	Ret	1^{P}^{F}	DSQ			1^{P}^{F}	2^{P}	Ret^{F}	92
2	(United Kingdom) Damon Hill	2	Ret	6^{F}	Ret	1	2	2^{P}^{F}	1^{P}^{F}	8	2	1^{F}	1^{F}	1	2	1^{F}	Ret	91
3	(Austria) Gerhard Berger	Ret	2	Ret	3	Ret	4	3	Ret	1^{P}	12^{†}	Ret	2	Ret^{P}	5	Ret	2	41
4	(Finland) Mika Häkkinen	Ret	Ret	3	Ret	Ret	Ret	Ret	3	Ret		2	3	3	3	7	12^{†}	26
5	(France) Jean Alesi	3			5	4	3	Ret	2	Ret	Ret	Ret	Ret^{P}	Ret	10	3	6	24
6	(Brazil) Rubens Barrichello	4	3	DNQ	Ret	Ret	7	Ret	4	Ret	Ret	Ret^{P}	4	4	12	Ret	4	19
7	(United Kingdom) Martin Brundle	Ret	Ret	8	2	11^{†}	Ret	Ret	Ret	Ret	4^{†}	Ret	5	6	Ret	Ret	3	16
8	(United Kingdom) David Coulthard					Ret	5		5	Ret^{F}	Ret	4	6^{†}	2^{F}				14
9	(United Kingdom) Nigel Mansell							Ret							Ret	4	1^{P}	13
10	(Netherlands) Jos Verstappen	Ret	Ret					Ret	8	Ret	3	3	Ret	5	Ret			10
11	(France) Olivier Panis	11	9	11	9	7	12	Ret	12	2	6	7	10	DSQ	9	11	5	9
12	(United Kingdom) Mark Blundell	Ret	Ret	9	Ret	3	10^{†}	10	Ret	Ret	5	5	Ret	Ret	13	Ret	Ret	8
13	(Germany) Heinz-Harald Frentzen	Ret	5	7	WD	Ret	Ret	4	7	Ret	Ret	Ret	Ret	Ret	6	6	7	7
14	(Italy) Nicola Larini		Ret	2														6
15	(Brazil) Christian Fittipaldi	Ret	4	13^{†}	Ret	Ret	DSQ	8	9	4	14^{†}	Ret	Ret	8	17	8	8	6
16	(United Kingdom) Eddie Irvine	Ret				6	Ret	Ret	DNS	Ret	Ret	13^{†}	Ret	7	4	5	Ret	6
17	(Japan) Ukyo Katayama	5	Ret	5	Ret	Ret	Ret	Ret	6	Ret	Ret	Ret	Ret	Ret	7	Ret	Ret	5
18	(France) Éric Bernard	Ret	10	12	Ret	8	13	Ret	13	3	10	10	7	10	18			4
19	(Austria) Karl Wendlinger	6	Ret	4	DNS													4
20	(Italy) Andrea de Cesaris			Ret	4		Ret	6	Ret	Ret	Ret	Ret	Ret	Ret	Ret			4
21	(Italy) Pierluigi Martini	8	Ret	Ret	Ret	5	9	5	10	Ret	Ret	8	Ret	12	15	Ret	9	4
22	(Italy) Gianni Morbidelli	Ret	Ret	Ret	Ret	Ret	Ret	Ret	Ret	5	Ret	6	Ret	9	11	Ret	Ret	3
23	(France) Érik Comas	9	6	Ret	10	Ret	Ret	11^{†}	Ret	6	8	Ret	8	Ret	Ret	9		2
24	(Finland) JJ Lehto			Ret	7	Ret	6						9	Ret		Ret	10	1
25	(Italy) Michele Alboreto	Ret	Ret	Ret	6	Ret	11	Ret	Ret	Ret	7	9	Ret	13	14	Ret	Ret	1
—	(United Kingdom) Johnny Herbert	7	7	10	Ret	Ret	8	7	11	Ret	Ret	12	Ret	11	8	Ret	Ret	0
—	(Monaco) Olivier Beretta	Ret	Ret	Ret	8	DNS	Ret	Ret	14	7	9							0
—	(Portugal) Pedro Lamy	10	8	Ret	11													0
—	(France) Jean-Marc Gounon							9	16	Ret	Ret	11	Ret	15				0
—	(Italy) Alessandro Zanardi					9	15	Ret	Ret	Ret	13		Ret		16	13	Ret	0
—	(Australia) David Brabham	12	Ret	Ret	Ret	10	14	Ret	15	Ret	11	Ret	Ret	Ret	Ret	12	Ret	0
—	(Finland) Mika Salo															10	Ret	0
—	(Austria) Roland Ratzenberger	DNQ	11	DNS (Note: Roland Ratzenberger died in a crash at the Villeneuve Curva during qualifying for the 1994 San Marino Grand Prix.)														0
—	(France) Franck Lagorce															Ret	11	0
—	(France) Yannick Dalmas												Ret	14				0
—	(Belgium) Philippe Adams											Ret		16				0
—	(Italy) Domenico Schiattarella														19		Ret	0
—	(France) Bertrand Gachot	Ret	DNQ	Ret	Ret	Ret	Ret	DNQ	DNQ	DNQ	DNQ	DNQ	DNQ	DNQ	DNQ	DNQ	DNQ	0
—	(Brazil) Ayrton Senna	Ret^{P}	Ret^{P}	Ret^{P}														0
—	(Japan) Hideki Noda														Ret	Ret	Ret	0
—	(France) Paul Belmondo	DNQ	DNQ	DNQ	Ret	Ret	DNQ	DNQ	DNQ	DNQ	DNQ	DNQ	DNQ	DNQ	DNQ	DNQ	DNQ	0
—	(France) Philippe Alliot										Ret	Ret						0
—	(Japan) Aguri Suzuki		Ret															0
—	(Japan) Taki Inoue															Ret		0
—	(Switzerland) Jean-Denis Délétraz																Ret	0
—	(Italy) Andrea Montermini					DNQ												0
Pos.	Driver	BRA (Brazil)	PAC (Japan)	SMR (Italy)	MON (Monaco)	ESP (Spain)	CAN (Canada)	FRA (France)	GBR (United Kingdom)	GER (Germany)	HUN (Hungary)	BEL (Belgium)	ITA (Italy)	POR (Portugal)	EUR (Spain)	JPN (Japan)	AUS (Australia)	Points

Key
Colour	Result
Gold	Winner
Silver	Second place
Bronze	Third place
Green	Other points position
Blue	Other classified position
Blue	Not classified, finished (NC)
Purple	Not classified, retired (Ret)
Red	Did not qualify (DNQ)
Black	Disqualified (DSQ)
White	Did not start (DNS)
White	Race cancelled (C)
Blank	Did not practice (DNP)
Blank	Excluded (EX)
Blank	Did not arrive (DNA)
Blank	Withdrawn (WD)
Blank	Did not enter (empty cell)
Annotation	Meaning
P	Pole position
F	Fastest lap

Notes:

- † – Driver did not finish the Grand Prix but was classified, as he completed more than 90% of the race distance.

=== World Constructors' Championship standings ===
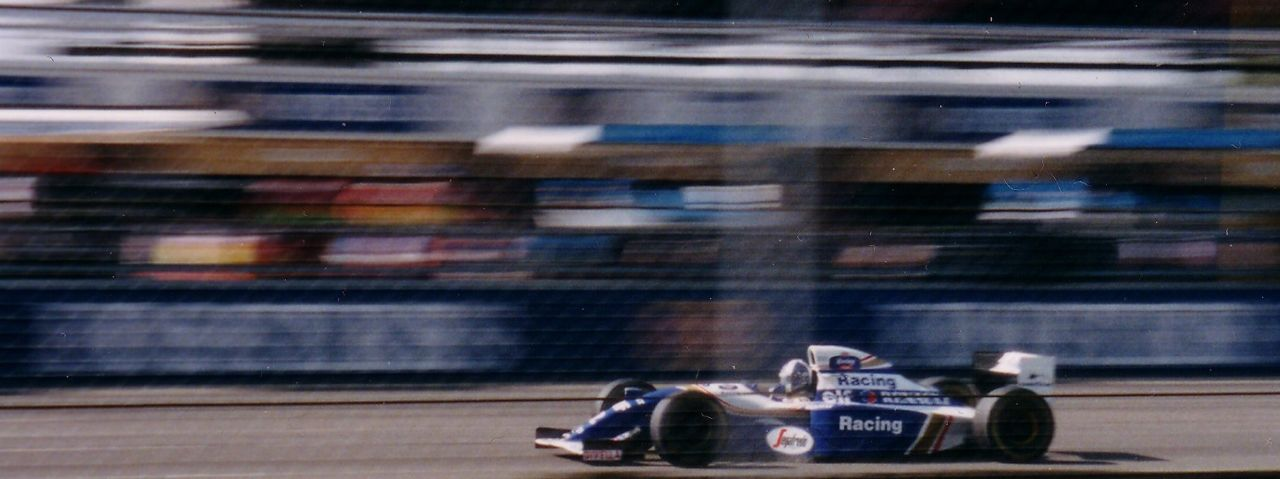
Williams-Renault won the 1994 Constructors' Championship.

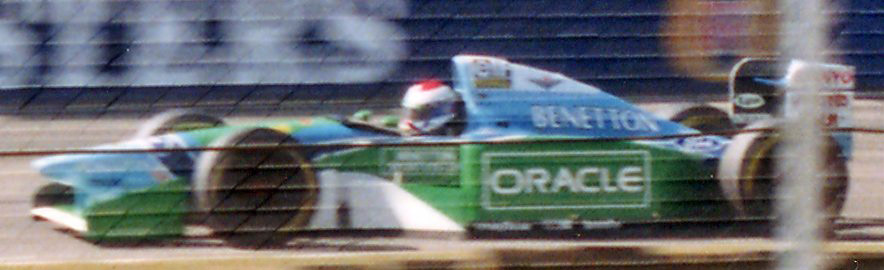
Benetton-Ford placed second.

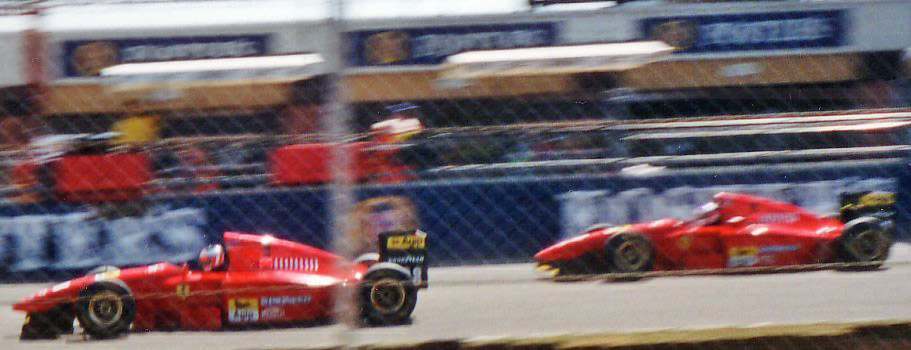
Ferrari placed third.

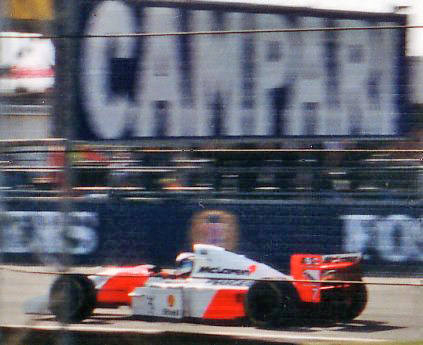
McLaren-Peugeot placed fourth.

Pos.	Constructor	No.	BRA (Brazil)	PAC (Japan)	SMR (Italy)	MON (Monaco)	ESP (Spain)	CAN (Canada)	FRA (France)	GBR (United Kingdom)	GER (Germany)	HUN (Hungary)	BEL (Belgium)	ITA (Italy)	POR (Portugal)	EUR (Spain)	JPN (Japan)	AUS (Australia)	Points
1	(United Kingdom) Williams-Renault	0	2	Ret	6^{F}	Ret	1	2	2^{P}^{F}	1^{P}^{F}	8	2	1^{F}	1^{F}	1	2	1^{F}	Ret	118
1	(United Kingdom) Williams-Renault	2	Ret^{P}	Ret^{P}	Ret^{P}		Ret	5	Ret	5	Ret^{F}	Ret	4	6^{†}	2^{F}	Ret	4	1^{P}	118
2	(United Kingdom) Benetton-Ford	5	1^{F}	1^{F}	1	1^{P}^{F}	2^{P}^{F}	1^{P}^{F}	1	DSQ	Ret	1^{P}^{F}	DSQ	9	Ret	1^{P}^{F}	2^{P}	Ret^{F}	103
2	(United Kingdom) Benetton-Ford	6	Ret	Ret	Ret	7	Ret	6	Ret	8	Ret	3	3	Ret	5	Ret	Ret	Ret	103
3	(Italy) Ferrari	27	3	Ret	2	5	4	3	Ret	2	Ret	Ret	Ret	Ret^{P}	Ret	10	3	6	71
3	(Italy) Ferrari	28	Ret	2	Ret	3	Ret	4	3	Ret	1^{P}	12^{†}	Ret	2	Ret^{P}	5	Ret	2	71
4	(United Kingdom) McLaren-Peugeot	7	Ret	Ret	3	Ret	Ret	Ret	Ret	3	Ret	Ret	2	3	3	3	7	12^{†}	42
4	(United Kingdom) McLaren-Peugeot	8	Ret	Ret	8	2	11^{†}	Ret	Ret	Ret	Ret	4^{†}	Ret	5	6	Ret	Ret	3	42
5	(Republic of Ireland) Jordan-Hart	14	4	3	DNQ	Ret	Ret	7	Ret	4	Ret	Ret	Ret^{P}	4	4	12	Ret	4	28
5	(Republic of Ireland) Jordan-Hart	15	Ret	Ret	Ret	4	6	Ret	Ret	DNS	Ret	Ret	13^{†}	Ret	7	4	5	Ret	28
6	(France) Ligier-Renault	25	Ret	10	12	Ret	8	13	Ret	13	3	10	10	7	10	8	Ret	11	13
6	(France) Ligier-Renault	26	11	9	11	9	7	12	Ret	12	2	6	7	10	DSQ	9	11	5	13
7	(United Kingdom) Tyrrell-Yamaha	3	5	Ret	5	Ret	Ret	Ret	Ret	6	Ret	Ret	Ret	Ret	Ret	7	Ret	Ret	13
7	(United Kingdom) Tyrrell-Yamaha	4	Ret	Ret	9	Ret	3	10^{†}	10	Ret	Ret	5	5	Ret	Ret	13	Ret	Ret	13
8	(Switzerland) Sauber-Mercedes	29	6	Ret	4	DNS		Ret	6	Ret	Ret	Ret	Ret	Ret	Ret	Ret	Ret	10	12
8	(Switzerland) Sauber-Mercedes	30	Ret	5	7	WD	Ret	Ret	4	7	Ret	Ret	Ret	Ret	Ret	6	6	7	12
9	(United Kingdom) Footwork-Ford	9	Ret	4	13^{†}	Ret	Ret	DSQ	8	9	4	14^{†}	Ret	Ret	8	17	8	8	9
9	(United Kingdom) Footwork-Ford	10	Ret	Ret	Ret	Ret	Ret	Ret	Ret	Ret	5	Ret	6	Ret	9	11	Ret	Ret	9
10	(Italy) Minardi-Ford	23	8	Ret	Ret	Ret	5	9	5	10	Ret	Ret	8	Ret	12	15	Ret	9	5
10	(Italy) Minardi-Ford	24	Ret	Ret	Ret	6	Ret	11	Ret	Ret	Ret	7	9	Ret	13	14	Ret	Ret	5
11	(France) Larrousse-Ford	19	Ret	Ret	Ret	8	DNS	Ret	Ret	14	7	9	Ret	Ret	14	Ret	Ret	Ret	2
11	(France) Larrousse-Ford	20	9	6	Ret	10	Ret	Ret	11^{†}	Ret	6	8	Ret	8	Ret	Ret	9	Ret	2
—	(United Kingdom) Lotus-Mugen-Honda	11	10	8	Ret	11	9	15	Ret	Ret	Ret	13	Ret	Ret	16	16	13	Ret	0
—	(United Kingdom) Lotus-Mugen-Honda	12	7	7	10	Ret	Ret	8	7	11	Ret	Ret	12	Ret	11	18	10	Ret	0
—	(United Kingdom) Simtek-Ford	31	12	Ret	Ret	Ret	10	14	Ret	15	Ret	11	Ret	Ret	Ret	Ret	12	Ret	0
—	(United Kingdom) Simtek-Ford	32	DNQ	11	DNS		DNQ		9	16	Ret	Ret	11	Ret	15	19	Ret	Ret	0
—	(United Kingdom) Pacific-Ilmor	33	DNQ	DNQ	DNQ	Ret	Ret	DNQ	DNQ	DNQ	DNQ	DNQ	DNQ	DNQ	DNQ	DNQ	DNQ	DNQ	0
—	(United Kingdom) Pacific-Ilmor	34	Ret	DNQ	Ret	Ret	Ret	Ret	DNQ	DNQ	DNQ	DNQ	DNQ	DNQ	DNQ	DNQ	DNQ	DNQ	0
Pos.	Constructor	No.	BRA (Brazil)	PAC (Japan)	SMR (Italy)	MON (Monaco)	ESP (Spain)	CAN (Canada)	FRA (France)	GBR (United Kingdom)	GER (Germany)	HUN (Hungary)	BEL (Belgium)	ITA (Italy)	POR (Portugal)	EUR (Spain)	JPN (Japan)	AUS (Australia)	Points

Notes:

- † – Driver did not finish the Grand Prix but was classified, as he completed more than 90% of the race distance.

== See also ==
- 1994 Formula One cheating controversy
- Death of Ayrton Senna

== Bibliography ==
- Malik, Ibrar (2019). 1994: The Untold Story of a Tragic and Controversial F1 Season. Grantham, Lincs, UK: Performance Publishing. ISBN 9780957645035.
