= Cultural depictions of Empress Matilda =

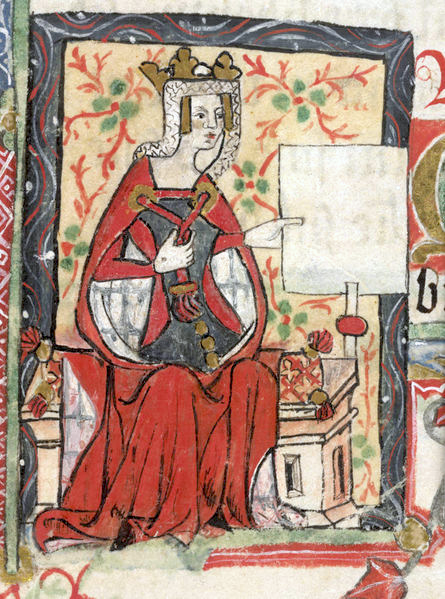
Portrait of Empress Mathilda, from "History of England" by St. Albans monks (15th century)

The 12th-century ruler Empress Matilda has been depicted in various cultural media.

== Theatre, film and television ==
Matilda is a character in Henry I of England, a play by Beth Flintoff, which was first performed in November 2016 at St James's Church, Reading. The drama follows the story of the three sons of William the Conqueror and ends with the early reign of her father Henry, including the time when Matilda became Empress by marrying Henry V of Germany. The narrative continues in Flintoff's play Matilda the Empress, first performed in 2017 at the same venue with Dani McCallum taking the lead part. It depicts Matilda's later life and The Anarchy period after Henry I's death when she and her cousin Stephen were rivals for the succession. In the concluding part of Flintoff's trilogy, Henry II, which was first performed in October 2018 at Reading's Minster Church of St Mary the Virgin, Matilda is depicted attending the dedication of Reading Abbey over the Easter weekend of 1164.

Matilda is also a character in Jean Anouilh's play Becket. In the 1964 film adaptation, she was portrayed by Martita Hunt.

She was played by Brenda Bruce in the 1978 BBC TV series The Devil's Crown, which dramatised the reigns of her son and grandsons.

Alison Pill portrayed Matilda in the 2010 TV miniseries The Pillars of the Earth, an adaptation of Follett's novel.

The character of Rhaenyra Targaryen, a major character in George R. R. Martin's fantasy novel Fire & Blood and its television adaptation House of the Dragon, was inspired by Matilda.

== Historical fiction ==
Novels dealing with the civil war between Matilda and Stephen include:

- A Legend of Reading Abbey (1845) by Charles Macfarlane.
- The Fool by H. C. Bailey (1927), deals with Matilda's relationship with her son, Henry II.
- The Empress (1932) by Carola Oman
- Cecelia Holland, The Earl (1971)
- Graham Shelby, The Villains of the Piece (1972) (published in the US as The Oath and the Sword)
- E. L. Konigsburg, A Proud Taste for Scarlet and Miniver (1973)
- Jean Plaidy, The Passionate Enemies, the third book of her Norman Trilogy (1976)
- The Brother Cadfael series by Ellis Peters (beginning in 1977 with A Morbid Taste for Bones) and the TV series made from them starring Sir Derek Jacobi. In these books Empress Matilda is referred to by her vernacular name, Empress Maud.
- Roberta Gellis, The Sword and the Swan (1977).
- Ken Follett, The Pillars of the Earth (1989)
- Ellen Jones, The Fatal Crown (1991)
- Sharon Penman, When Christ and His Saints Slept tells the story of the events before, during and after the civil war (1995)
- Haley Elizabeth Garwood, The Forgotten Queen (1997)
- Elizabeth Chadwick, Lady of the English (2012)
- Amy Mantravadi, The Girl Empress (2017), part of a series of novels telling Matilda's life story
- Gemma Lawrence, The Heirs of Anarchy (2020-2022), four book series

== See also ==
- Cultural depictions of Henry I of England
- Cultural depictions of Henry II of England
- Cultural depictions of Adelaide of Italy
- Cultural depictions of Theophanu
- Cultural depictions of Gisela of Swabia
