= Moritz Brosig =

German cathedral organist and composer

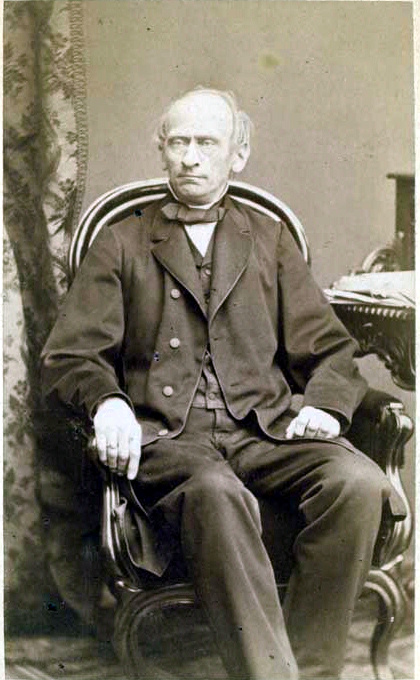
c. 1870

Moritz Brosig (15 October 1815 - 24 January 1887) was a German cathedral organist and composer. He came to be seen as a leading representative of the so-called Breslau School of church musicians. Despite his Roman Catholic faith, he wrote more than thirty chorale preludes, working in a musical genre more traditionally associated with Lutheran worship.

== Life ==
=== Provenance and early years ===
Moritz Brosig was born the youngest son of Joseph Brosig, a minor landowner at Fuchswinke in the countryside on the southern edge of Lower Silesia. His mother Barbara was the daughter of the man who owned the Kreuzer printing works in the Silesian capital, Breslau. When Brosig was just three his father died: his mother sold the family lands and moved with her son to Breslau, which is where Moritz grew to adulthood and, indeed, where he lived for the rest of his life. He attended the well-regarded Matthias-Gymnasium (secondary school), where he had the opportunity to study the piano works of Schubert. The experience encouraged himself to take music more seriously. but cut short his school career in order to progress to a Catholic Teacher Training College (" Lehrerseminar"). The college director advised against a career in teaching, however, due to the youth's "weak constitution": he left after three months. It was only now that he took the decision to become a professional church musician. Between 1835 and 1838 he studied organ with Franz Wolf at the university's Institute for Church Music. The syllabus would have included the works of Rinck, Fischer, Kittel, Albrechtsberger and of course the master himself, J S Bach. According to his biographer Rudolf Walter, Brosig was no prodigy, but he made up for any deficiency in flair with an exceptionally industrious approach to practicing.

=== Music professional ===
In 1838 Brosig took over as the organist at St. Adalbert's church in the heart of the city. During this period he deputised with growing frequency for his teacher-mentor, who combined his teaching responsibilities with a role as principal cathedral organist on the north side of the river. At the end of 1842, aged only 40, Franz Wolf died following acute problems with his ears. Early in 1843 Brosig took over at the cathedral as "Kapellmeister" and principal organist. Although he never gave concerts outside the cathedral, Brosig became well known for his organ playing and, above all, for his improvisational talents which earned him the plaudits of contemporaries, one of whom was heard to observe that although Adolf Hesse played the organ works of Bach and Louis Spohr far better than Brosig, Brosig was by far more the more talented of the two when it came to improvising an organ fantasy. (Note: "Weit begabter und ergiebiger in der Erfindungskraft einer freien Orgelphantasie ist Moritz Brosig.") In 1869 the organist Franz Dirschke shared his opinion in the "Zeitschrift für katholische Kirchenmusik" ("Journal of Catholic Church Music") that Brosig's playing appealed alike to the musical expert and to the musically untutored: "one can only regret that all those splendid and accomplished improvisations which [he had] created as a cathedral organist during the services are [nothing more than] a pleasing memory for those who heard them. [It can be argued that] as far as the free prelude to the organ is concerned, Brosig had no equal". In December 1853, following the death of the longstanding incumbent Bernhard Hahn (1780–1852), Brosig took over as "Domkapellmeister".

=== University professor ===
From 1871 Brosig supplemented his duties at the cathedral with a lectureship at the Institute for Church Music at the University of Breslau. In 1879 the university conferred a doctorate on him after he had written a "Theory of Modulation" ("Modulationstheorie"), published in 1865, and a "Treatise on Harmonies" ("Harmonielehre") in 1874. His doctoral dissertation concerned "Church Music of the sixteenth and seventeenth centuries" (" Kirchen-Kompositionen des 16. und 17. Jahrhunderts"), with a focus on its re-introduction into Catholic worship during the nineteenth century. He subsequently became a professor at the university, teaching both the organ and music theory. Emanuel Adler, Heinrich Reimann, Anna Schuppe, and Salomon Jadassohn were among his students. Brosig's 1874 "Treatise on Harmony" ("Harmonielehre") enjoyed significant commercial success, with a third edition published after eight years. After Brosig's death, in 1899 Carl Thiel published a fourth edition, now with a new title, as the "Handbuch der Harmonielehre und Modulation".

For many years Moritz Brosig suffered from a problem with his legs which limited his ability to travel and indeed, as the years wore on, made it difficult for him to climb up to the organ loft. During the 1880s he found he could no longer manage the stairs, and during the final part of his career his duties in the organ loft were increasingly delegated to his assistant Adolf Greulich. In 1884, now aged 69, Brosig resigned his posts. He died in Breslau three years later, survived by his wife and son.

== Cecilian Movement ==
Moritz Brosig's career coincided with the emergence of a movement in Catholic Germany for the restoration of "intelligibility" to church music. There was a concern with quality, and also a powerful move to abolish "profane music" in churches. The cheerfulness arising from dance rhythms along with the anthrocentric self-portrayal and theatricality reminiscent of operatic arias were a particular concern for many of the early proponents of what became known as the Cecilian Movement. At more a detailed level there was clearly scope for significant differences of opinion as to what constituted "profanity" in music. The reformers were indeed slow to agree on a standard repertory of "acceptable" church music. The name of the movement came most directly from the national "General Cecilian Association for Germany" ("Allgemeiner Cäcilien-Verband für Deutschland"), founded in Bamberg in October 1868. Its establishment was followed by the creation of equivalent organisations at the regional level. Later in 1868 or early in 1869 Moritz Brosig was a co-founder of the "Silesian Cecilian Association" ("Schlesischen Cäcilien-Vereins") in Oppeln.

In his 1880 work on the reintroduction of sixteenth and seventeenth century church music to Catholic liturgy (Note: "Ueber die alten Kirchen-Compositionen des 16. und 17. Jahrhunderts und ihre Wiedereinführung im katholischen Gottesdienste") Brosig quoted with evident approval the verdict of the polymath-musicologist Emil von Schafhäutl:

- "If we want to discuss [the old music] without irrational and excessive enthusiasm, then [it is necessary to bear in mind] that much of the character of this music is attributable in the first instance to the robustly serious character of those times: since the secular music from those times follows precisely the same forms and structures as the religious. And indeed, if you sing the notes without the words it becomes barely possible to distinguish religious music from the rest."
- "Wollen wir (von der alten Musik) ohne überschwängliche Begeisterung sprechen, so ist ein grosser Theil des Charakters dieser Musik vorzüglich auch dem kräftigeren und ernsteren Charakter dieser Zeit zuzuschreiben; denn die weltliche Musik dieser Zeit ist genau nach derselben Schablone geformt, wie die geistliche, und wenn man die Noten ohne Text singt, würde man die oft ziemlich leichtfertigen Lieder unseres großen Lasso von seinen geistlichen Motetten kaum zu unterscheiden im stande."
  Moritz Brosig (1880), quoting Emil von Schafhäutl

Brosig very quickly distanced himself from the association, however, not wishing to make common cause with the more extremist calls for a return to an imagined musical tradition characterised by pre-enlightenment purity. It is clear from the way in which he ran the music at the cathedral that he was committed to many of the ideas associated with the "Cäcilians", and he was indeed active in promoting many of the movement's aspirations. In June 1963 he published an article on Gregorian Chant in the Luxembourgish specialist journal "Cäcilia", powerfully opposing the nineteenth century practice of harmonising forms of church music which had been created centuries earlier without any thought for potential "harmonisation", a notion which was indeed totally foreign to it. Brosig's aggressive writing on the subject attracted hostile reactions from various "mainstream" church musicians including, in this instance, Georg Schmitt, formerly organist at Trier and after 1850 in charge of the "Great Organ" at Church of Saint-Sulpice in Paris whose reaction was notably polemical.

In Breslau cathedral orchestral music continued to be used: that was not the case in cathedrals such as that at catholic Regensburg where the pronouncements of leading Cecilians such as Franz Xaver Witt were implemented less selectively. At Breslau, too, there were changes. Certain sung masses by Haydn, Mozart and Cherubini were determined by Brosig to be "unliturgical", and gradually disappeared from the repertoire featured, replaced by more contemporary liturgical settings, including some of Brosig's own compositions. The customary use of small wind ensembles in the cathedral for accompaniment to processional stages in the liturgy was ended, and from 1860 the music used in the cathedral during the "Kartage" (three holiest days of Holy Week) was based on "a cappella" (unaccompanied) polyphony.

So Brosig represented a moderate approach to the Cecilian reforms, giving the sixteenth and seventeenth century vocal music appropriate recognition for its artistic worth and liturgical appropriateness, but without rejecting contemporary compositions, and without rejecting the expressive broadening offered by the traditional incorporation of musical instruments (in addition to the organ) in Catholic church music. In 1880 Brosig published his own opinions of the Cecilian controversy in his treatise "Über die alten Kirchenkompositionen und ihre Wiedereinführung" (approximately, "On the old ecclesiastical compositions and their reintroduction").

== Breslau School ==
Brosig's compositions resonated most strongly with the church music community in Silesia, and in Catholic southern Germany more broadly, as well as in the German speaking lands of Austro-Hungary (Cisleithania). With the exception of a very small amount of chamber music and a handful of songs, his output consisted exclusively of church music. Most of his organ and vocal music was published by one or other of six publishers. Brosig wrote good music for church use. Like many contemporary composers he drew inspiration from Felix Mendelssohn, echoes of whose stylistic devices can frequently be identified in his music. Contemporaries praised his melodic ingenuity and the variety of his harmonies. Rudolf Walter also detects the influence of Schubert and Carl Maria von Weber in Brosig's church music. An essay appeared in the 1869 edition of the "Zeitschrift für katholische Kirchenmusik" ("Journal of Catholic Church Music") commending his work: "The principal body of the choir is given due recognition. Yet none of the voices is taken to the extreme limits of the vocally possible, so that in technical terms the delivery is always 'comfortable'. Nowhere does the orchestral accompaniment overwhelm the main themes: any orchestration serves only to reinforce the character of the text." (Note: "Dem Vokalchor fällt in richtiger Würdigung der Hauptanteil zu. Dabei ist indes keine der Singstimmen bis an die äußersten Grenzen ihres Umfanges geführt, so daß in dieser Hinsicht die Ausführung nur bequem zu nennen ist. Das Orchester, nirgends die Hauptsache überwuchernd, ist in so weit angewandt, als es zur wahren Charakterisierung des Textes beitragen hilft.") Distancing his approach from what had become the traditional classical and indeed at times operatic orchestrally accompanied masses, while at the same time firmly rejecting radical Cecilian exclusion of any orchestral involvement within the cathedral building, Brosig tried to respect the liturgical circumstances with his compositions and to produce music that respected contemporary norms without compromising on quality. In this way he became an important early representative of the so-called Breslau School of Cathedral Kapellmeisters during the nineteenth and twentieth centuries, in the process building the cathedral's reputation as a centre of church music excellence.

== Published prose works (selection) ==
- Ueber die alten Kirchen-Compositionen des 16. und 17. Jahrhunderts und ihre Wiedereinführung beim Katholischen Gottesdienste. Leipzig: F. E. C. Leuckart, 1880.
- Handbuch der Harmonielehre und Modulation. 6the edition, reworked, with various contributions by Carl Thiel. Leipzig: Leuckart, 1912.

== Published compositions (selection) ==
- opus 1: Drei Praeludien und Fugen (e-Moll, C-Dur, fis-Moll)
- opus 3: Fünf Orgelstücke zum Gebrauch beim Gottesdienste (4 Praeludien in f-moll, G-Dur, b-Moll, G-Dur; Praeludium und Fuge in g-Moll)
- opus 4: Fünf Choralvorspiele (Nun sich der Tag geendet hat, Auf meinen lieben Gott, Liebster Jesus wir sind hier, Aus tiefer Not schrei ich zu dir, O Haupt voll Blut und Wunden)
- opus 6: Fantasie über das Lied "Christus ist erstanden"
- opus 7: Messe (e-Moll)
- opus 8b: Einundzwanzig Vorspiele zu Predigtliedern
- opus 11: Drei Praeludien (F-Dur, C-Dur, Es-Dur) und zwei Postludien (f-Moll, C-Dur)
- opus 12: Vier Orgelstücke (Praeludium G-Dur, Vorspiel zu dem Liede "O Traurigkeit", Praeludium und Fuge in a-Moll, Praeludium in As-Dur)
- opus 16: Deutsche Choralmesse nach alten Choralmelodien
- opus 19: Sechs Tonstücke für Orgel
- opus 22: Deux Sérénades p. Pfte et Violon (ou Violoncelle)
- opus 23: Kúrze und leicht ausführbare Vespern (De Confessore)
- opus 29: 3te (Kurze) Messe
- opus 30: Melodien zum katholischen Gesangbuche
- opus 32: Orgelbuch
- opus 46: Acht Orgelstücke verschiedenen Charakters (Praeludien in D-Dur, f-Moll, G-Dur, C-Dur, c-Moll, D-Dur; Festvorspiel in Es-Dur, Praeludium in g-Moll)
- opus 47: Fünf Orgelstücke (3 Andante in B-Dur, A-Dur- As-Dur; Praeludium in A-Dur; Postludium in D-Dur)
- opus 49: Fünf Orgelstücke (Fantasie in c-Moll; 3 Andante in a-Moll, E-Dur, F-Dur; Adagio in As-Dur)
- opus 52: Zehn Orgelstücke verschiedenen Charakters und zwei Choralvorspiele
- opus 53: Fantasie Nr.1 in f-Moll
- opus 54: Fantasie Nr.2 in Es-Dur
- opus 55: Fantasie Nr.3 in d-Moll
- opus 58: Acht Orgelstücke (Praeludien in e-Moll, C-Dur; Postludien in f-Moll, d-Moll, Vorspiele zu "Straf mich nicht in deinem Zorn", "Komm Gott, Schöpfer"; Trios in E-Dur, G-Dur)
- opus 60: Sechs Praeludien und Fugen (Es-Dur, c-Moll, E-Dur, a-Moll, D-Dur, cis-Moll)
- opus 61: Fünf Tonstücke verschiedenen Charakters nebst drei Postludien mit Angabe der Pedal-Applicatur
