= Cultural depictions of Adelaide of Italy =

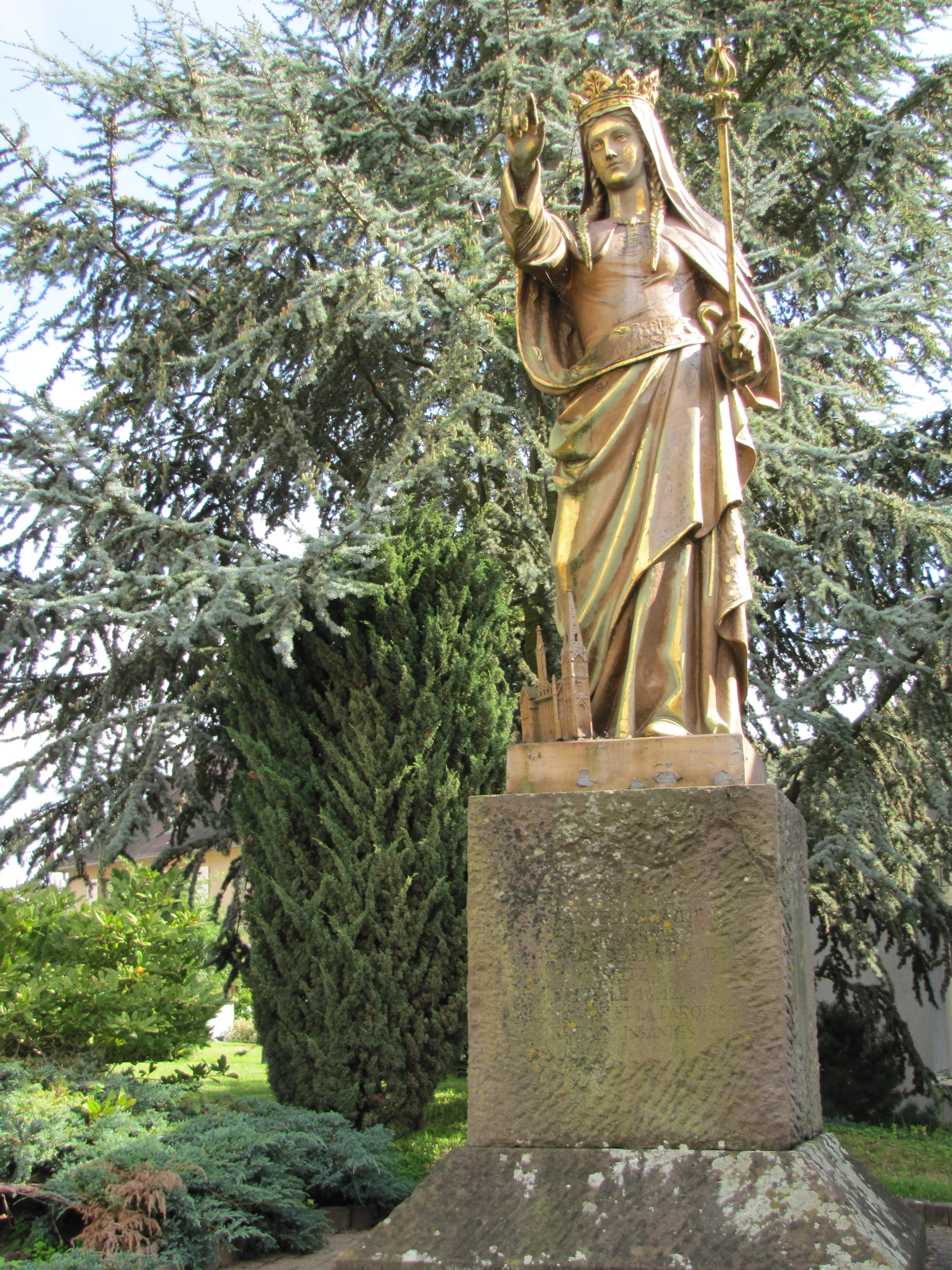
Bronze statue of Saint Adelaide as the founder of Abbey in Seltz

Adelaide of Italy was an important medieval ruler and holy figure, having been called "the most important woman of her century", "the most powerful of Ottonian women" and one of the most powerful queens of the entire Middle Age. As princess of Burgundy (as daughter of Rudolph II of Burgundy), queen of Italy (consort of Lothair II of Italy) and later Holy Roman empress (consort of Otto the Great), she had deep connections to many European regions. Having supported the Church greatly during her lifetime, she was canonized soon after her death. Historically the subject of numerous religious, artistic and scholarly works, she is now explored by modern historiography primarily as a political figure.

== Historiography ==
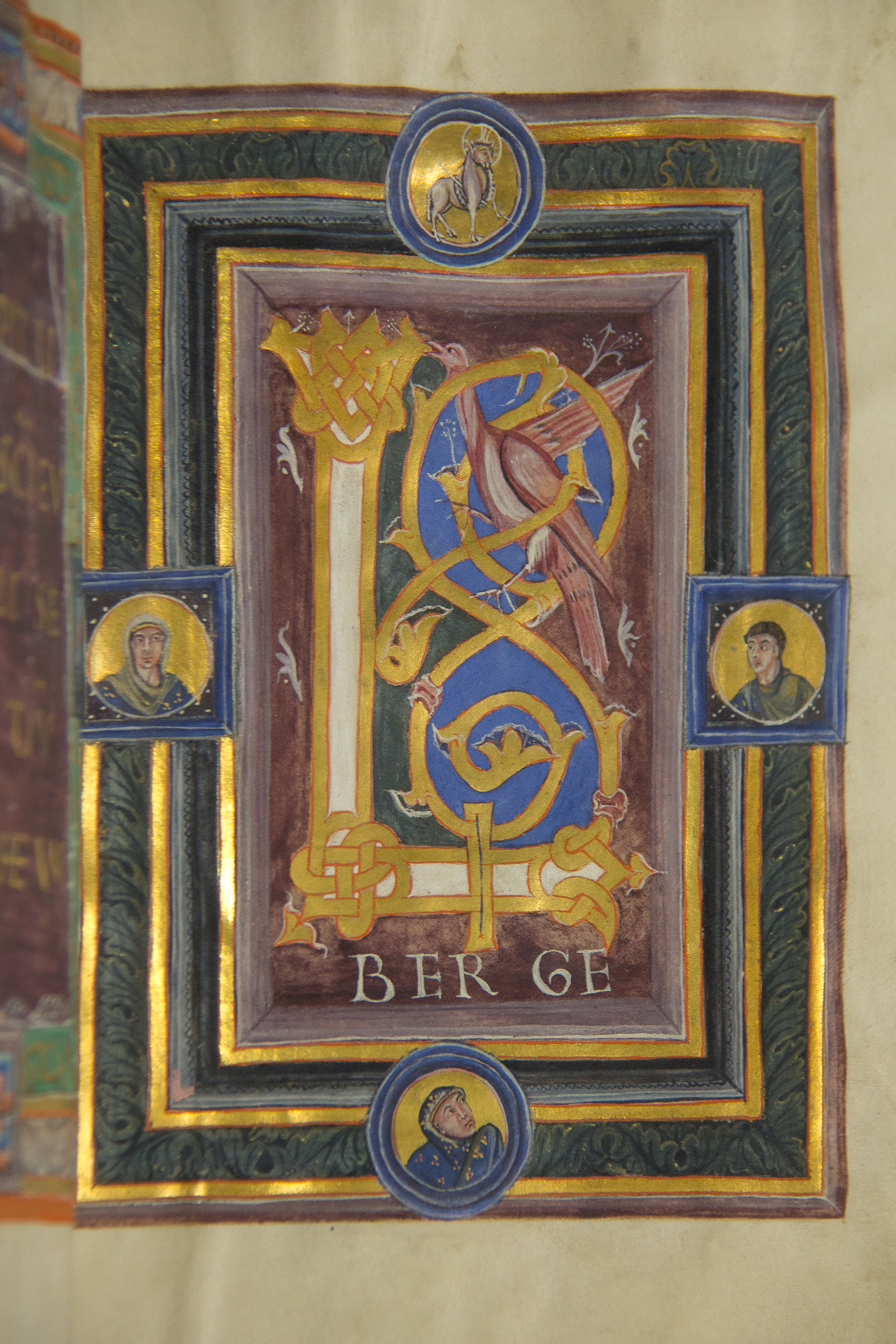
Adelaide (left), Theophanu and Otto III, St. Gereon Gospel Book (984–1000)

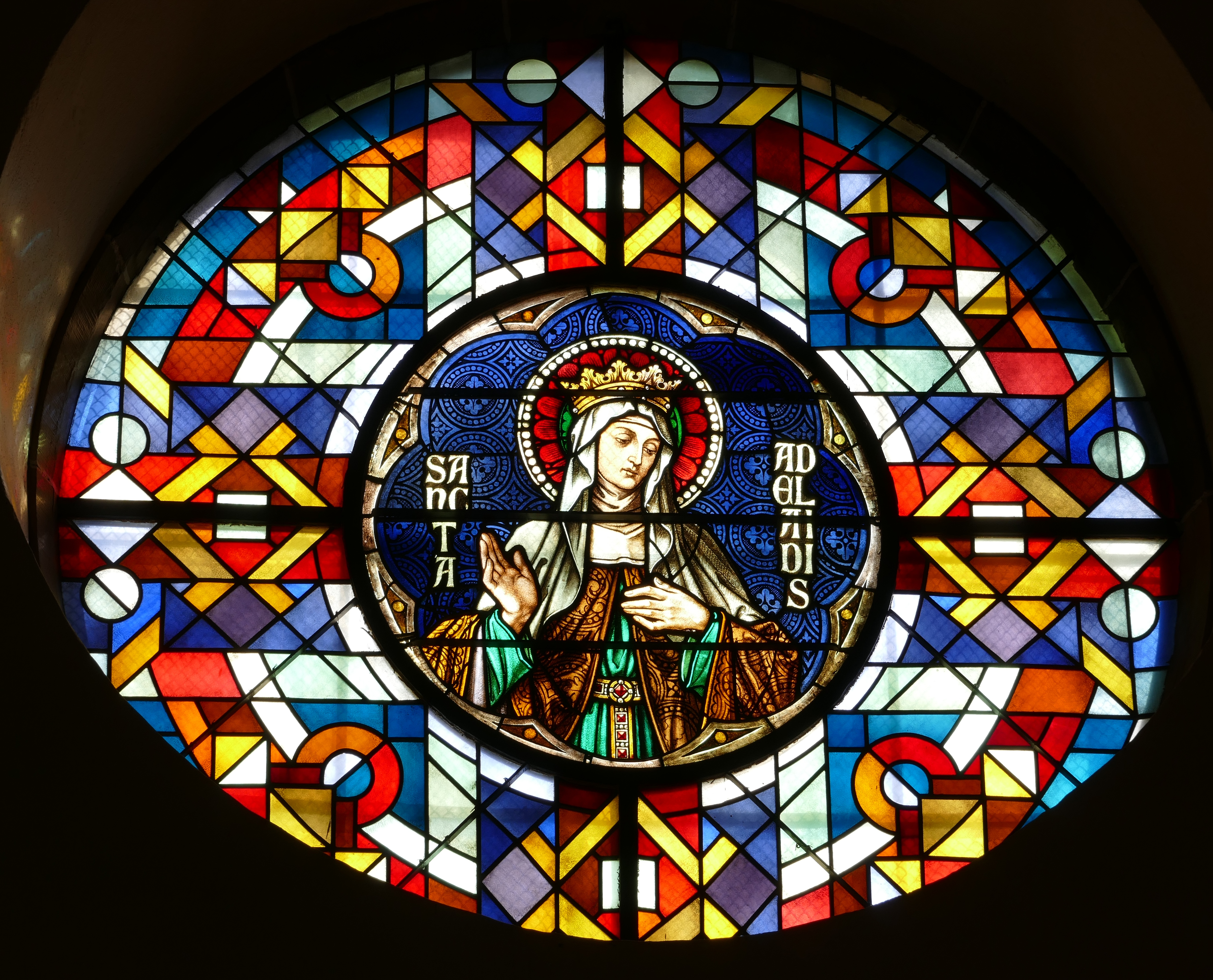
Adelaide, stained glass, Église Sainte-Odile de Lapoutroie, Alsace.

Adelaide was famous across Europe in her lifetime. It is even said that no other empress had been praised as much by contemporaries as Adelaide. Despite this, Simon MacLean notes that Adelaide's fame as a spiritual figure and her nachleben (afterlife) as a favourite subjects of artists, in sơme ways, have done her a disservice as a political figure. In the 1930s, through her work Adelheid – Mutter der Königreiche, the scholar and politician Gertrud Bäumer utilized her myth – which combined political power, motherhood and charity – to promote the bourgeois feminist movement.

According to MacLean, even though Adelaide was without doubt powerful and influential (she was the petitioner in one third of her husband Otto's extant acts between 951 and 973), it was still quite hard to separate Adelaide's and Otto's (and other family members' and advisors') individual inputs within the "black box" of rulership that they all belonged to. From the outside, the "king-plus-queen partnership" just acted together.

While Nash opines that Adelaide operated in a form of rule different from the male rulers – she worked in tandem with Otto I, supported him and legitimized his rule in Italy; she actively joined the planning and policy forming processes but relied on male actors in direct military action, Jestice hesitates in describing Adelaide's and other Ottonian female rulers' style of ruling as feminine and separate from the masculine style: during their regencies, excepting leading armies in person (which Cunigunde of Luxembourg did), the ruling practices of Adelaide and Theophanu were not different from those of the men: establishing and renewing personal alliances, negotiating peace treaties, granting favours, making use of their symbolic capital. Evidences also suggest that this was the very same fashion they operated during their husbands' reigns. Jestice also denounces the popularly accepted notion that Adelaide and Theophanu were primarily rivals – Knut Görich opines that Jestice convincingly presents the case for this by showing that passages in Odilo of Clune's Epitaphium Adelaideae are of questionable reliability. Görich also supports Jestice in defending the position that contemporary sources reveal no misogyny and basically the Ottonian society recognized the roles and abilities (except physical strength) of women, thus the commonly deemed special status of empresses and queens actually did not stand out in this context. Buchinger points out that the Saxon tradition, that perceived the wife as having an equal role in the family, had influence too, and notes that Adelaide chose to stay at the court instead of returning to her lands as Matilda had done. Görich opines, though, that the prominent roles and visibility the Ottonian empresses attained were partly product of circumstances created by Otto III's minority, as well as the fact he and Henry II died without issue. Görich also casts doubt on Jestice's idea of the reduced importance of female regents in the eleventh century.

Modern research also tends to put the empress's piety and her support of the Church and the Christian belief in light of political considerations. Jestice opines that, "Piety was the one instrument of successful rule where the women had a distinct advantage over the male members of their family." Buchinger sees her alliance with ecclesiastic groups as her way of building a sphere of influence independent from that of the emperor as well as preserving her memory and legacy. She actively supported Cluny's reform and later, Cluny played a leading role in building her cult and supporting her canonization. Gertsman opines, though, that the devotion of Cluny towards Adelaide and the Ottonians was personal in nature, rather than ideological.

Adelaide and Theophanu are often compared and contrasted in historiography. Some modern commentators like Gunther Wolf (in his book Kaiserin Theophanu. Prinzessin aus der Fremde) see Theophanu as the one who looked forward to the future, to modern forms of ruling, while Adelaide was the conservative who looked to the past. Stefan Weinfurter sees a more multifaceted and positive image of Adelaide. According to Weinfurter, it was true that Theophanu significantly contributed to the model of ruling inspired by Ancient Rome and Byzantine, that Otto II and especially Otto III took over and developed (although this model could not become the foundation for the future, because of Otto III's sudden death), while Adelaide represented the transmission of Italian-imperial tradition to the House of Saxony. She was also attached to her Italian-Burgundian connections and finally her Alsatian-Alemannish roots. But this helped her to mediate across realms while creating new power bases in the process and constantly providing a stabilizing effect to the Ottonian Dynasty, especially in its moments of great crisis (such as when she mobilized her relationships with her Burgundian and Bavarian relatives to protect Otto III at the beginning of his reign). She also played an initiating role in the development of Alsace as a hub between the Eastern Frankish kingdom, Burgundy, Italy and Upper Rhine – the latter received such a boost in traffic, politics and economy that 200 years later it would become, in the words of Otto of Freising, "the primary force of the empire" (maxima vis regni). Through her daughter Emma of Italy, to whom she was an advisor, she influenced French politics. Weinfurter sees in her a European dimension, that should be characterized as "modern".

== Legends ==
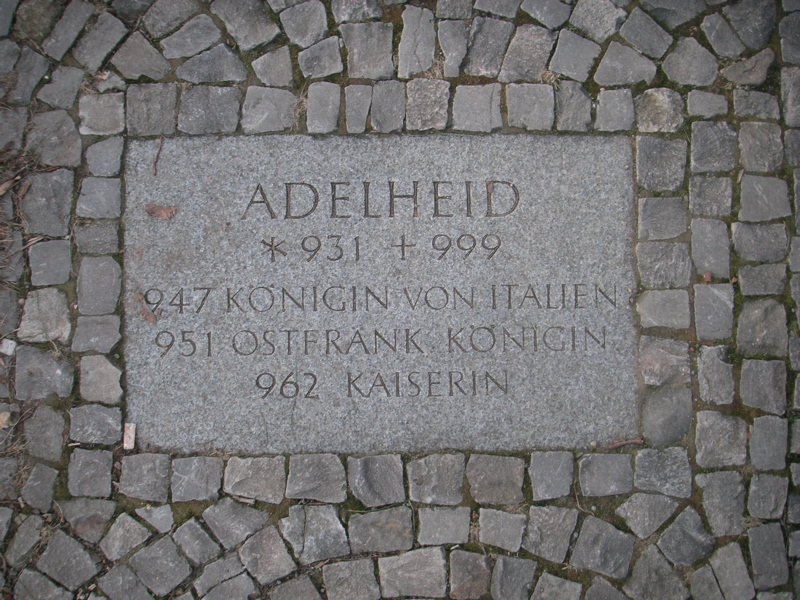
Adelheid's commemoration stone slab on the Weg der Ottonen, Magdeburg

- In her Gesta Ottonis, Hrotsvitha of Gandersheim tells a dramatized version of Adelaide's story before becoming Otto's queen: "When imprisoned by Berengar, she had only a maid and a priest for company. After several months of suffering, she dug her way to freedom ("Shawshank-style", in the words of MacLean) through a tunnel. She had to hide herself in a field of grain and miraculously escaped the thrusting spears of a party sent to recapture her. She was almost discovered by Berengar himself. Finally she was rescued by Bishop Adalard of Reggio, who was her friend. Hrosvitha's version highlights Adelaide's plight, initiative and piety, which brought Otto to Italy and the Italian crown to him. MacLean comments that, "Hrotsvitha's account should not be taken at face value: her stylized narrative is designed to show the hand of God orchestrating the rise of Otto to imperial status in 962, and to that end borrows tropes from a variety of literary and biblical sources."
- There are stories about her rivalry with Theophanu (exaggerated and spread by Odilo of Cluny, who disliked the latter, into full-blown enmity). Theophanu supposedly once said "If I shall still reign one year, Adelheid shall not rule over more ground than one can encompass with one hand." But "before one month was over", Theophanu died (15 June, 991), while Adelheid lived a long life.

== Depictions in arts ==
=== Contemporary arts ===
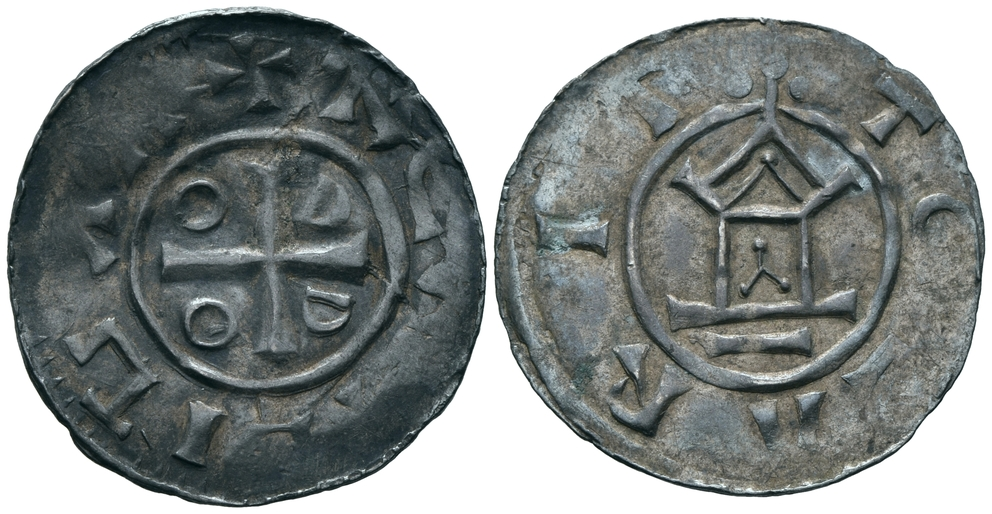
Otto-Adelheid-Pfennig, 983–1040, Wien Museum

- Otto Adelheid Pfennig is an Ottonian coin type. Numismatist Bernd Kluge opines that the coin was struck when Otto III was still a very young emperor. Adelaide was with him because she was "the Saxonian Dynasty incarnate".
- Odilo of Cluny's Epitaphium Domine Adelheide Auguste and Hrotsvitha's Gesta Ottonis are the main medieval sources about her life. Both describe her as a powerful ruler, but Odilo is more concerned about her deeds as saint, while Hrosvitha (who was not as close to the characters she described and had to rely on oral sources) emphasizes her political side. Hrosvitha's Adelaide, while not the main character (the main character is Otto I), is more heroic and adventurous, with her main attribute being her enormous spiritual power.

=== Later depictions ===
==== Visual arts ====
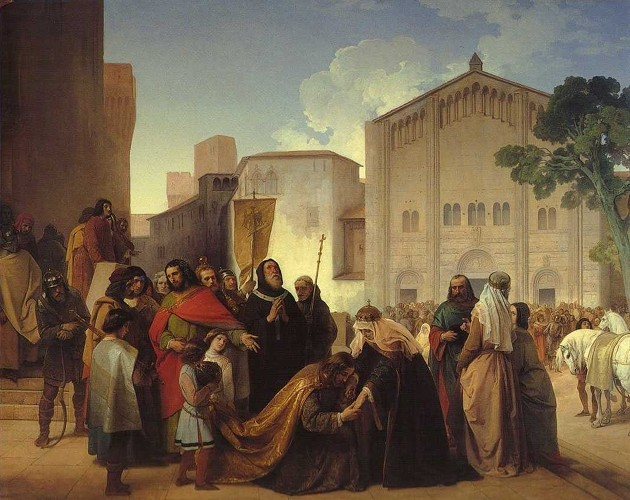
Hayez - Riconciliazione di Ottone II con Adelaide di Borgogna sua madre, 1858

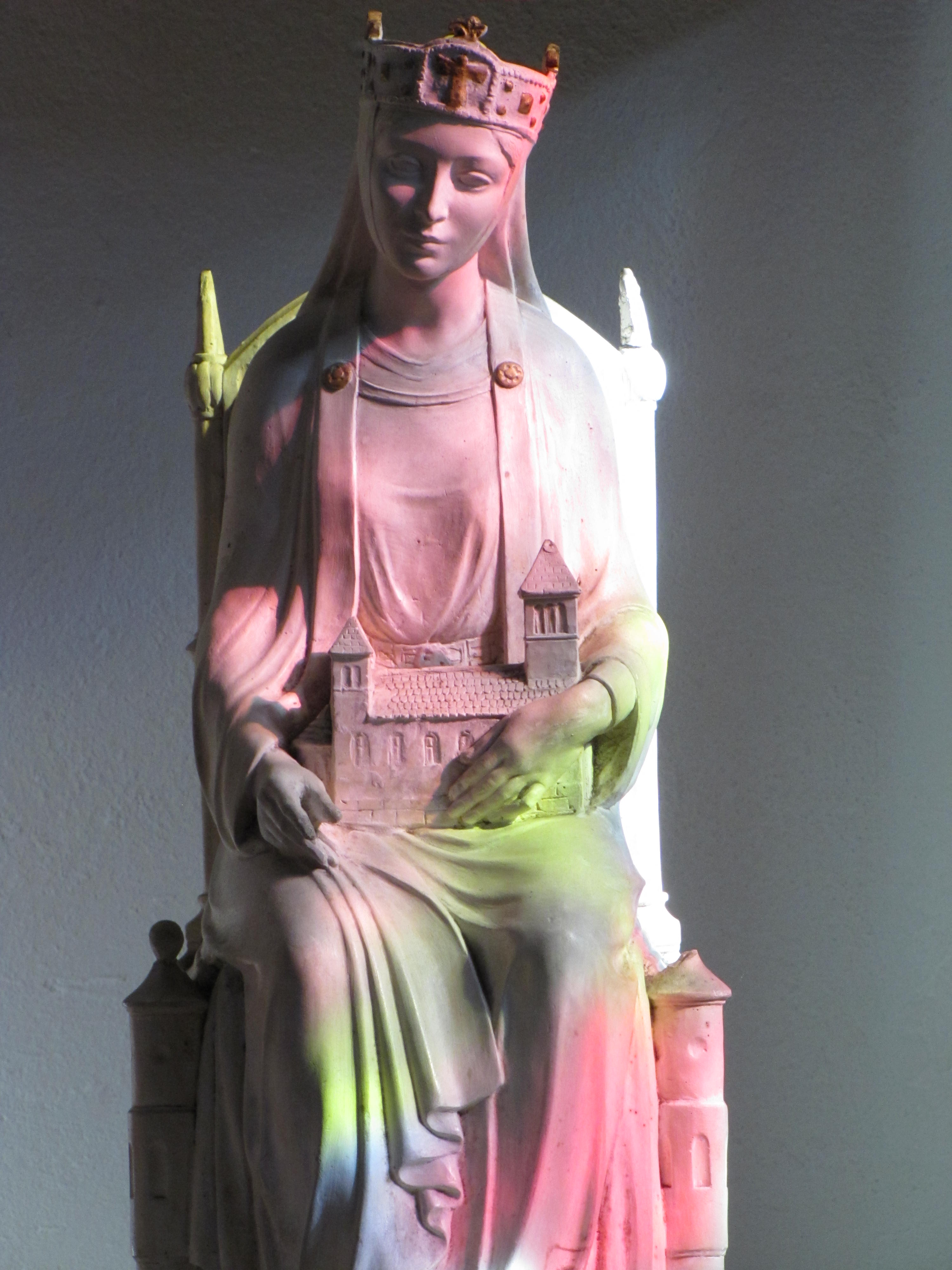
Statue of Adelaide, Église Saint-Étienne, Seltz

- On the exterior of Theatine Church, Munich, there is a statue of Adelaide placed there for the birth of Maximilian II Emanuel, Elector of Bavaria by his parents.
- Adelaide di Borgogna liberata dal diacono Martino (between 1830 and 1890), depicting Adelaide being liberated by Deacon Martino from the prison of the Garda castle, was painted by Felice de Maurizio.
- In his 1858 work Riconciliazione di Ottone II con Adelaide di Borgogna sua madre, Francesco Hayez portrays the reconciliation of Adelaide with her son Otto II.
- In 1839, Abel Terral painted Sainte Adélaïde de France, reine d'Italie, impératrice d'Allemagne ("St.Adelaide of France, queen of Italy, empress of Germany")
- In 1840, Jean-Auguste-Dominique Ingres created a portrait of Adelaide as Saint for the Saint-Ferdinand Chapel.
- The Palazzo Chiablese has a reliquiary (made between 1842 and 1855) that depicts Saint Adelaide, possibly donated to Adelaide of Austria, Queen of Sardinia.
- In 1890, Lodovico Pogliaghi drew the Incoronazione di Ottone il Grande e Adelaide, depicting the scene of coronation of Otto I and Adelaide.

==== Theater ====
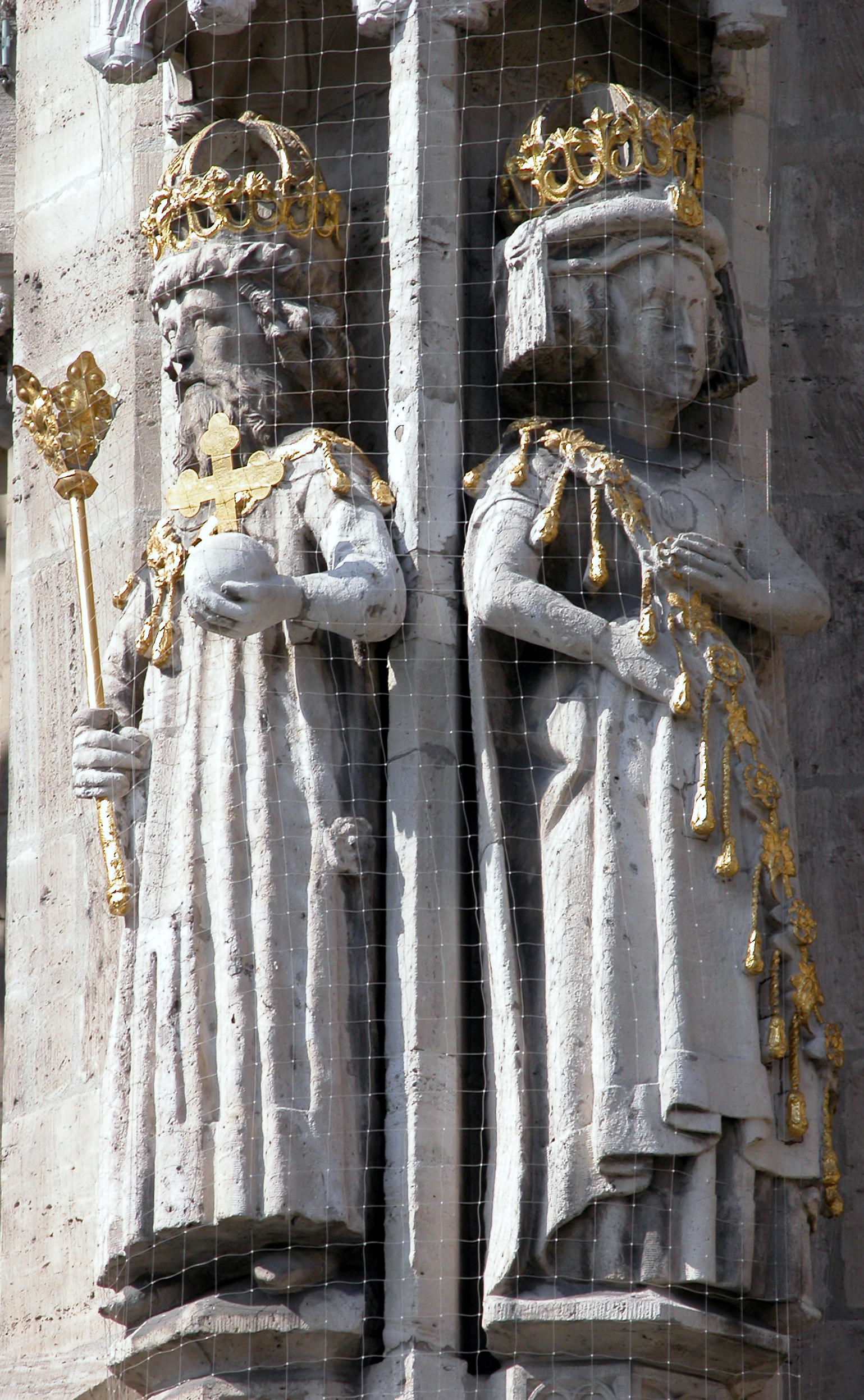
Adelaide and Otto I in the Old City Townhall, Braunschweig

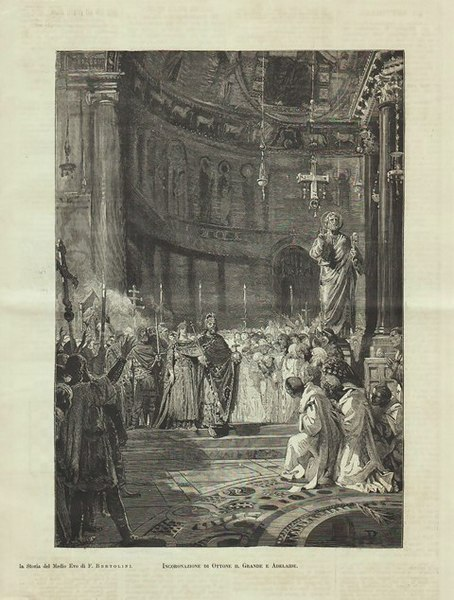
Incoronazione di Ottone il Grande e Adelaide, after the original drawing of Lodovico Pogliaghi (1890)

- L'Adelaide (1672) is an opera by Antonio Sartario with text by Pietro Dolphin.
- Alerano et Adelaide is a (anonymous) 1694 Italian opera written to celebrate the ascension of Augustus II the Strong.
- L'Adalberto overo La forza dell'astuzia femminile (1697) by Antonio Draghi is also about Adelaide.
- Adelaide (1719) by Pietro Torri with text by Antonio Salvi was written for the wedding of Charles Albrecht of Wittelsbach, later Holy Roman Emperor (the only non-Habsburg emperor of the late Empire) and Maria Amalia of Habsburg
- Adelheid, oder Die ungezwungene Liebe (1725) is an opera with music by Georg Philipp Telemann and libretto by Johann Philipp Praetorius, based on the text of Pietro Dolfin.
- Lotario (1729) by Georg Friedrich Händel with text by Giacomo Rossi is about Adelaide and Lothar and also features Otto.
- Adelaide (1729) is an opera by Giuseppe Maria Orlandini with text by Antonio Salvi.
- L'Adelaide is an opera (1735) by Antonio Vivaldi.
- Adelaide di Borgogna (1817) is an opera, authored by Gioachino Rossini with libretto by Giovanni Schmidt.
- Adelaide di Borgogna al castello di Canossa (1819) is an opera with text by Cesare Malmusi and music by Alessandro Gandini.
- Adelaide di Borgogna (Generali) (1823) is an opera by Pietro Generali with text by Luigi Romanelli.
- Ernst Raupach wrote the five-act trauerspiel Adelheid von Burgund in 1838.
- In 1851, Heinrich Lucius wrote the five-act dramatic poem (dramatisches Gedicht) Abelheid von Burgund.
- In 1861, Emil Hopffer wrote the dramatic poem Adelheid von Burgund.
- Adelheid, Gemahlin Ottos des Großen is an opera by Anna Benfey with text by the composer's brother (1866, Breslau)
- Königin Adelheid. Historisches Schauspiel in 5 Akten is an 1867 five-act opera by Moritz Blanckarts.
- Adelheid von Burgund oder Otto des Großen Brautfahrt is an 1886 five-act opera with music by Georg Wilhelm Rauchenecker and text by Otto Schönebeck.

==== Poems ====
- In a poem about Otto the Great, Friedrich Adolph Kuhn praises their marriage.

==== Prose ====
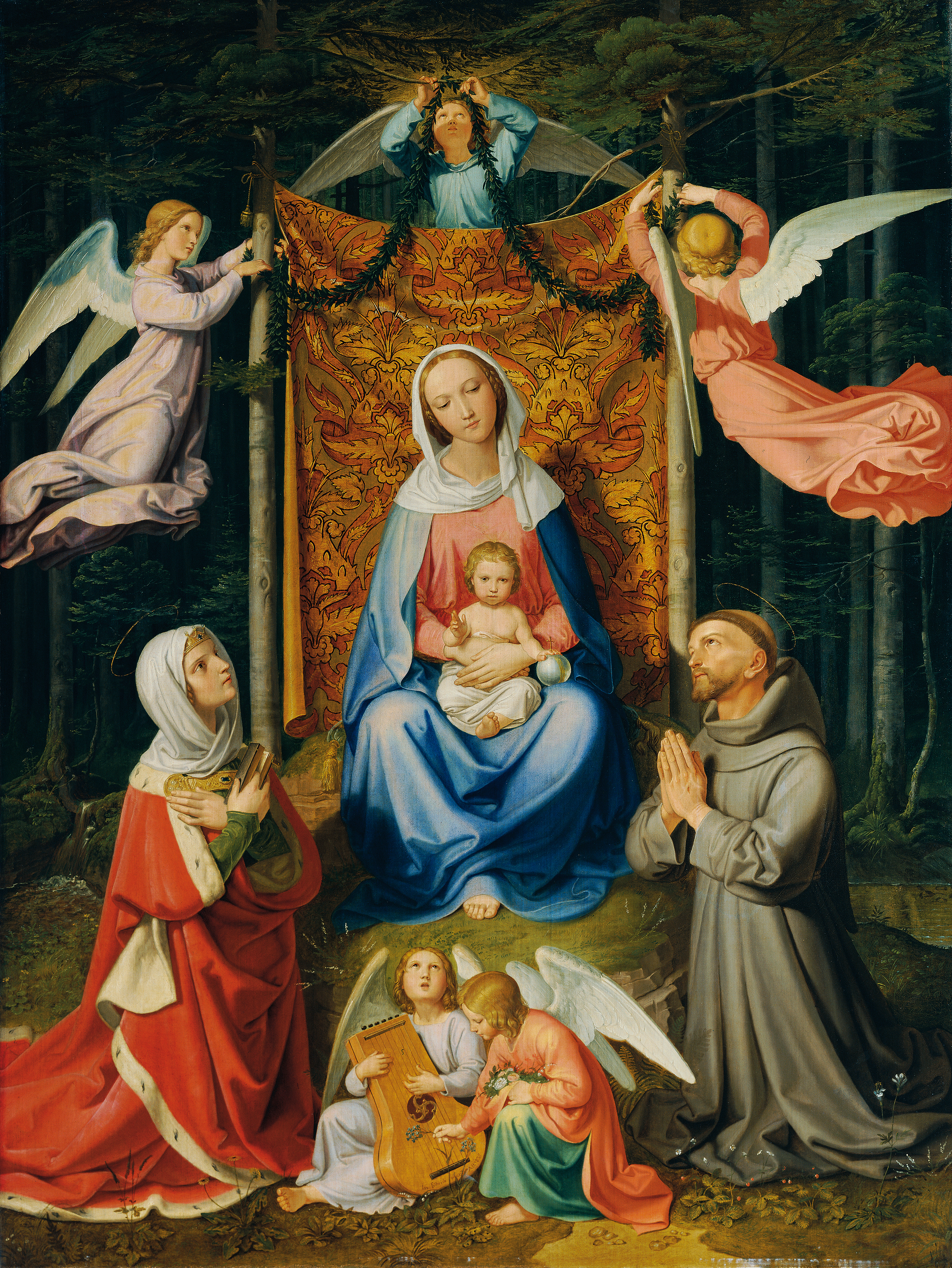
Joseph von Führich - Waldesruhe (Madonna mit Kind, hl. Adelheid und hl. Franziskus) ("Madonna with Child, Saint Adelaide of Burgundy, Saint Francis of Assisi") - 1514 - Österreichische Galerie Belvedere.

- Königin Adelheid (1818) is a Grimm story. In the story, she was besieged by Berengar in the Castle of Canusium. Arduin of Ivrea, who was with her, used a boar in a clever way to deceive the attackers. The siege was then lifted.
- Adelaide di Borgogna. Una donna medievale is a 2009 fictional work by Giancarlo Patrucco.
- Adelaide, imperatrice del lago: romanzo storico is a 2011 novel about the empress, written by Ketty Magni.
- Das Lächeln der Kaiserin Adelheid: weitgehend authentischer historischer Roman über Leben, Lieben und Leiden der Kaiserin Adelheid, zweiter Gemahlin Ottos des Großen is a 2014 novel about her life.
- Adelheid Von Burgund: Kaiserin des Mittelalters is a 2020 historical novel by Silvia Kornberger. The story is about the period Adelheid (Adelaide) was imprisoned by Berengar together with her daughter Emma and her maid Sophia. Adelheid dreams about her childhood, her mother, her love for Lothar and her childhood heartthrob Otto.
- She is a character in the 2022 novel Die Herrin der Päpste: Historischer Roman written by Eric Berg and Eric Walz. (The main character, Marozia, was her step-mother-in-law, as wife of Hugh of Italy, whose son Lothair became Adelaide's first husband.)

==== Films ====
- She is portrayed by Hanna Lütje in the 2010 MDR documentary Kaiserin Adelheid – Die mächtigste Frau der Ottonen ("Empress Adelaide, the most powerful lady of the Ottonians").
- Adelheid und Theophanu – Zwei Kaiserinnen is a 2021 short animation film by Ute Helmbold made for the exhibition Die Kaiser und die Säulen ihrer Macht" als Online-Ausstellung.

== Commemoration ==
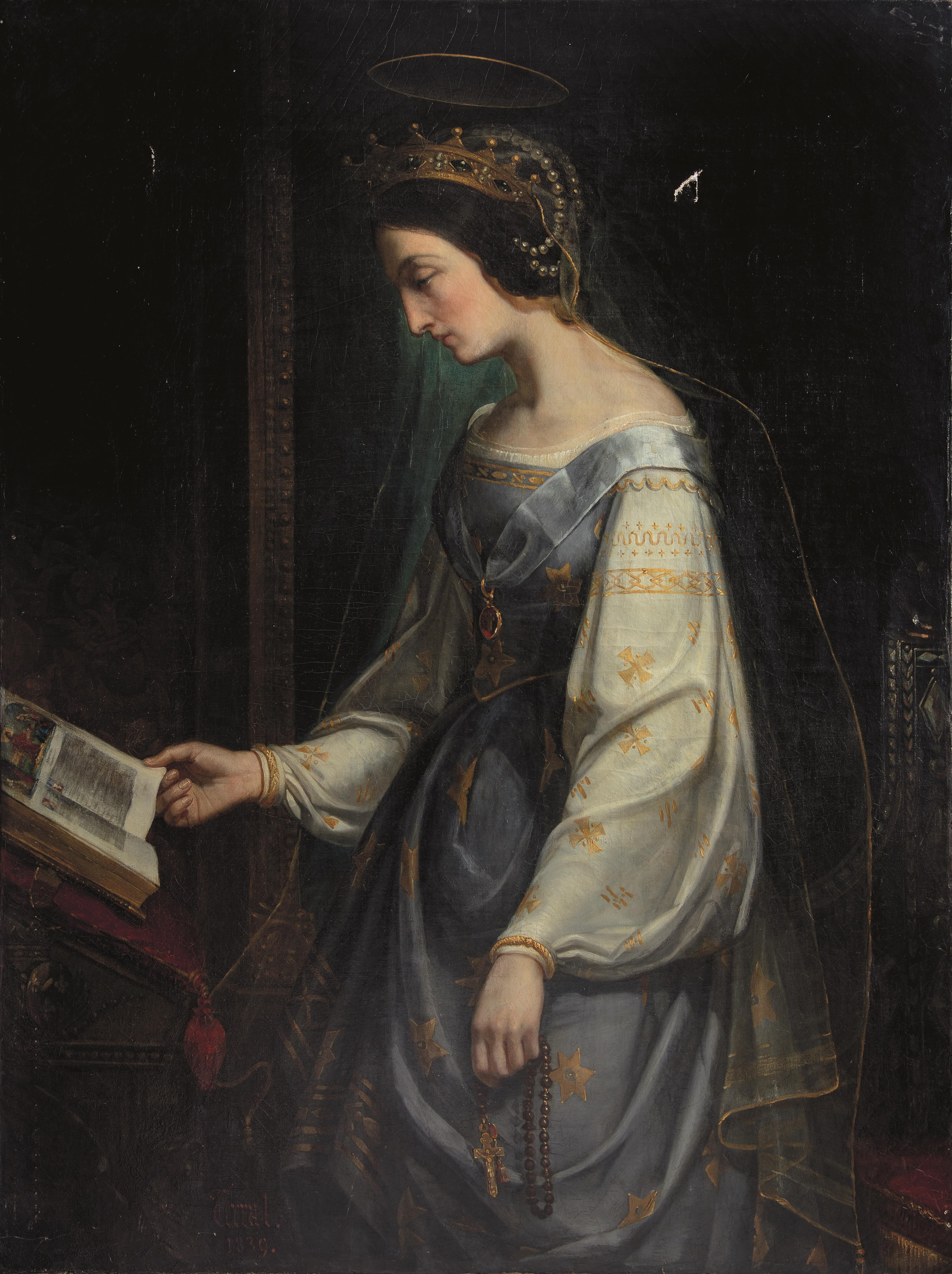
Abel Terral's Sainte Adelaide de France, reine d'Italie, imperatrice d'Allemagne

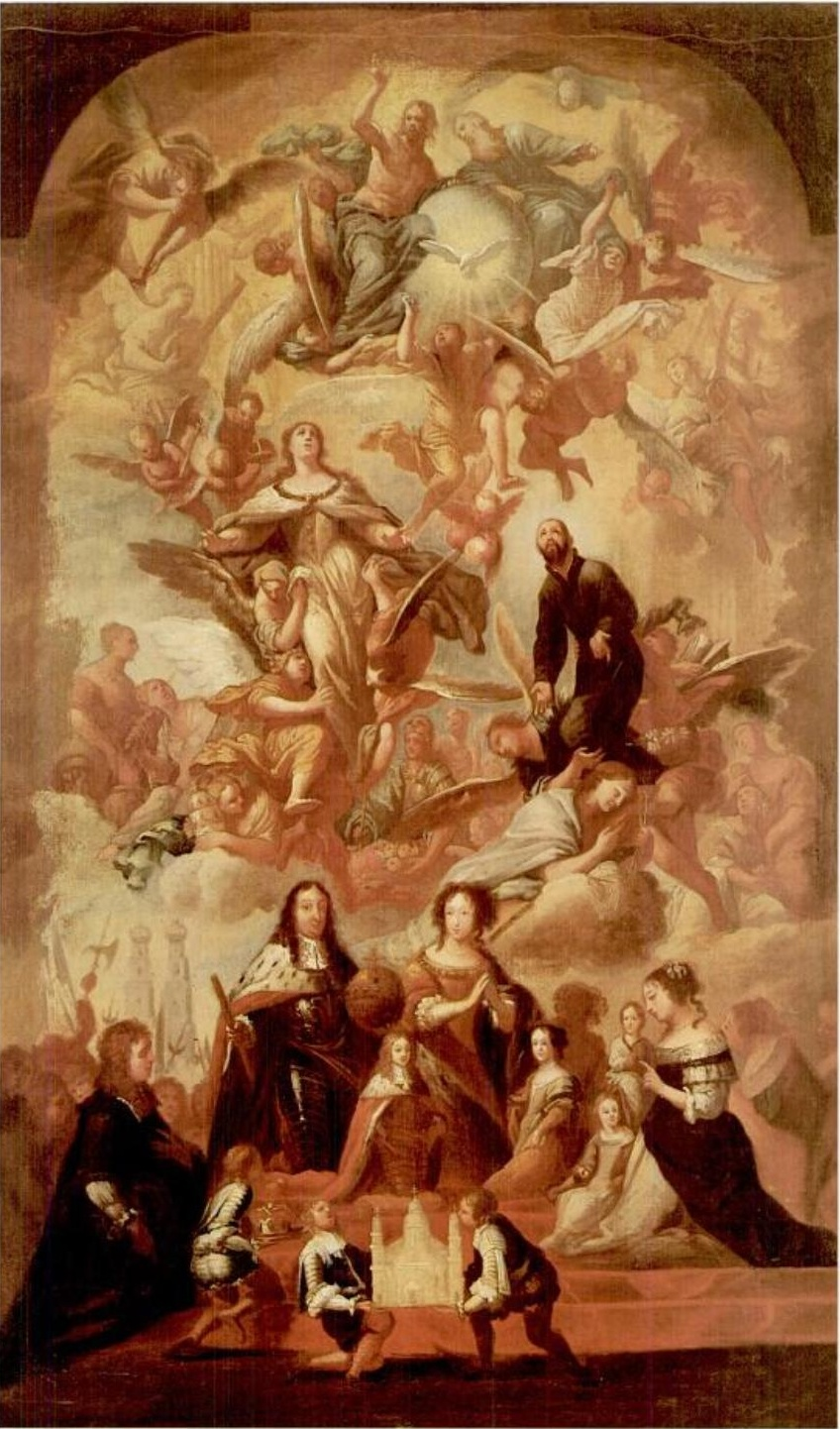
Die Heilige Dreifaltigkeit, die Heiligen Adelheid und Cajetan und der Kurfürst Ferdinand Maria von Bayern mit Familie und Gefolge ("The Holy Trinity, Saints Adelaide and Cajetan and Elector Ferdinand Maria of Bavaria, his wife Princess Henriette Adelaide of Savoywith their family and entourage" by Antonio Zanchi)

As a holy figure, she is venerated in the Catholic Church. Her feast day is December 16.

She is the co-patron of St Hedwig und Adelheid in Adelebsen, Göttingen (district), and the Theatine Church, Munich.

In 2015, there was the exhibition Adelheid? Werden, Wirken, Wunder? in Bonn.

In 2007, a FrauenOrt in Magdeburg was created and dedicated to Adelaide together with Editha and Theophanu.

== See also ==
- Cultural depictions of Otto the Great
- Cultural depictions of Theophanu
- Cultural depictions of Otto III, Holy Roman Emperor
- Cultural depictions of Gisela of Swabia
- Cultural depictions of Empress Matilda
- Cultural depictions of Barbara of Cilli

== Bibliography and further reading ==
- Jestice, Phyllis G. (12 April 2018). Imperial Ladies of the Ottonian Dynasty: Women and Rule in Tenth-Century Germany. Springer. ISBN 978-3-319-77306-3.
- Buchinger, Hannah Margarete (2016). Adelheid of Burgundy. Representation and memory of an Ottonian Empress and Christian Saint. p. 11.
- Fössel, Amalie (2011). Die Kaiserinnen des Mittelalters (in German). Verlag Friedrich Pustet. ISBN 978-3-7917-2360-0.
- Bäumer, Gertrud (1936). Adelheid, Mutter der Königreiche (in German). R. Wunderlich.
- MacLean, Simon (2017). Ottonian Queenship. Oxford University Press. ISBN 978-0-19-880010-1.
- Nash, Penelope (15 February 2017). Empress Adelheid and Countess Matilda: Medieval Female Rulership and the Foundations of European Society. Springer. ISBN 978-1-137-58514-1.
- Staab, Franz; Unger, Thorsten (2005). Kaiserin Adelheid und ihre Klostergründung in Selz: Referate der wissenschaftlichen Tagung in Landau und Selz vom 15. bis 17. Oktober 1999 (in German). Verlag der Pfälzischen Gesellschaft zur Förderung der Wissenschaften in Speyer. ISBN 978-3-932155-21-5.
- Merseburgensis, Thietmarus; Merseburg, Thietmar av (6 July 2001). Ottonian Germany: The Chronicon of Thietmar of Merseburg. Manchester University Press. ISBN 978-0-7190-4926-2.
- Stefan Weinfurter: Kaiserin Adelheid und das ottonische Kaisertum. In: Frühmittelalterliche Studien. Bd. 33, 1999, S. 1–19, (Digitalisat).
