= Caspar Ett =

German composer and organist

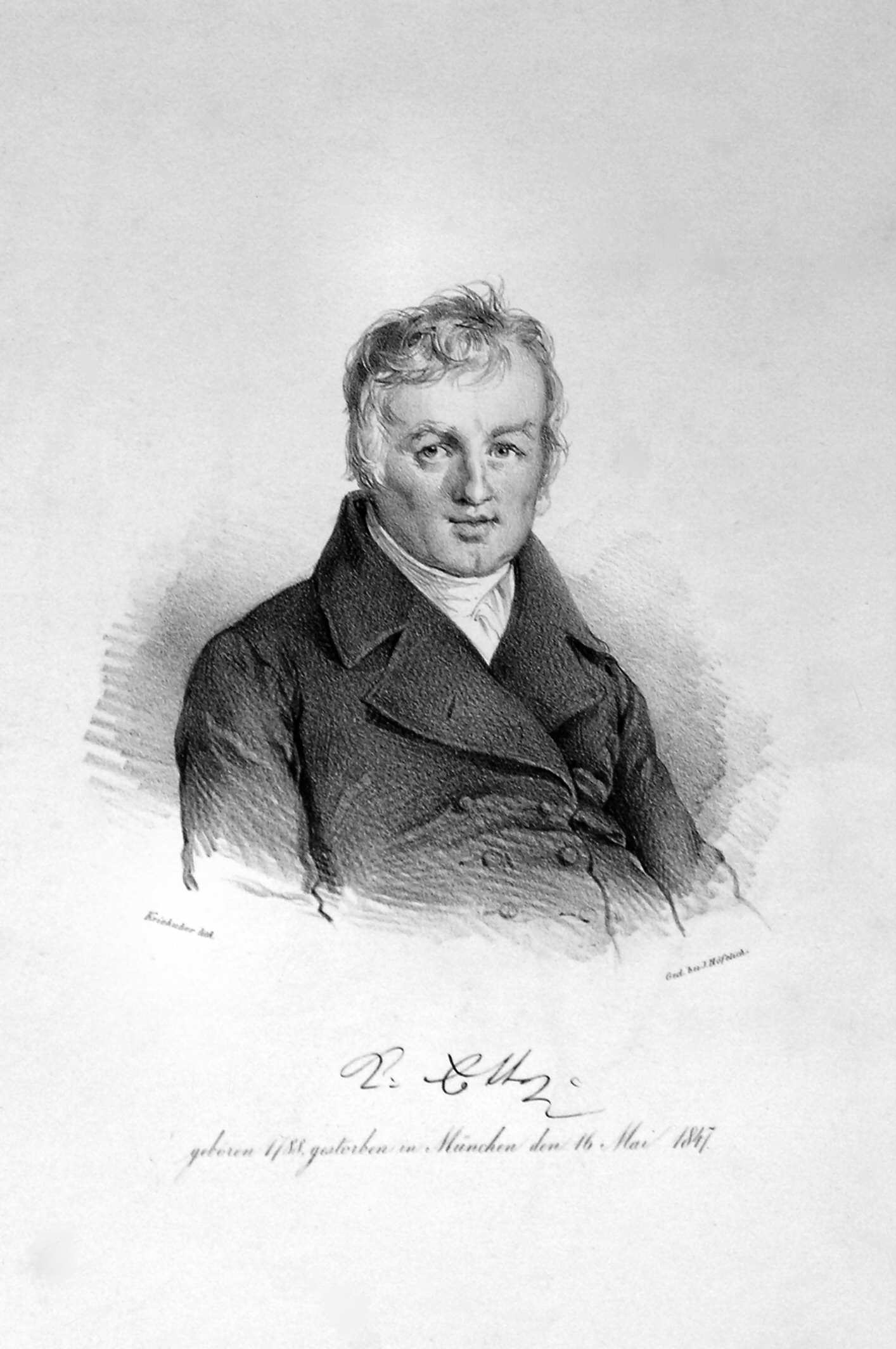
Lithograph of Caspar Ett by Josef Kriehuber.

Caspar Ett (5 January 1788, Eresing – 16 May 1847, Munich) was a German composer and organist.

== Life ==
Having completed his secondary studies at the "Paedagogium" in Munich, now called the Wilhelmsgymnasium, in 1804, Ett continued his studies at the Electoral Seminar in Munich, and in 1816 became the court organist at St. Michael's Church. He was also the music teacher of King Maximilian II of Bavaria.

Ett composed for the Catholic liturgy as well as for Greek Orthodox and Jewish worship. He played a role in reviving choral music from the 16th to the 18th century.

A street is named after him both in Eresing and in Munich city centre.

His grave is located in the Old South Cemetery in Munich.

== Works ==
- Missa pro defunctis (Requiem; 7 parts)
- Missa quadragesimalis
- Attollite portas (Auferstehungs-Chor Ad resurrectionem Domini)
- Ave maris stella
- Ave vivans hostia
- Laudate dominum
- Iste confessor Jesu
- Haec dies
- Pange lingua - Tantum ergo
- Prope est
- Redemptor omnium
- Cantica Sacra, München 1834

== Sources ==
- Karl Emil von Schafhäutl (1877). "Ett, Kaspar". Allgemeine Deutsche Biographie (in German). Vol. 6. Leipzig: Duncker & Humblot. pp. 392–397.
- Hella Gensbaur (1959). "Ett, Caspar". Neue Deutsche Biographie (in German). Vol. 4. Berlin: Duncker & Humblot. pp. 664–665. (full text online).
