= Cultural depictions of Theophanu =

Depictions of the Byzantine princess Theophanu

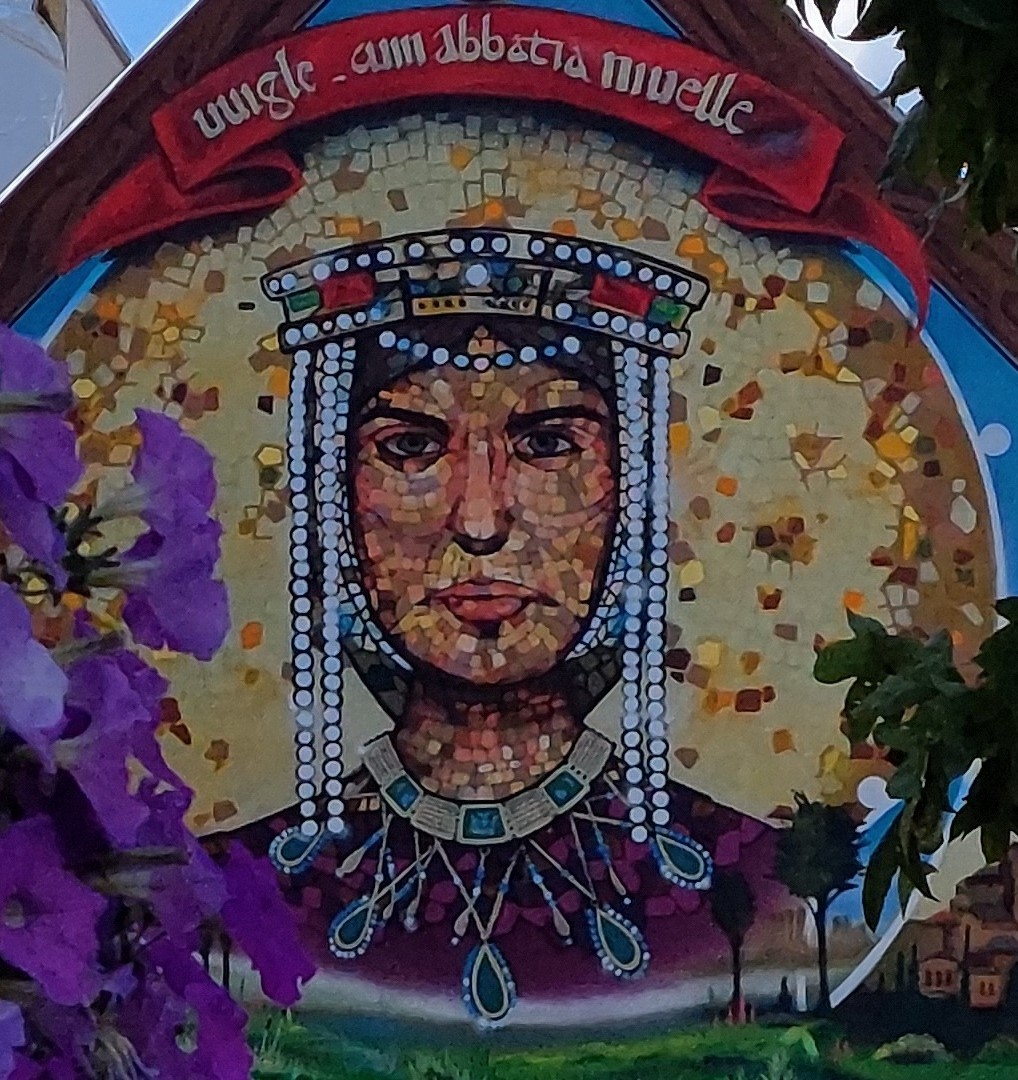
Theophanu, mural at Wichelen, Belgium, by CAZ

Theophanu (955–991) was a Byzantine princess who became Holy Roman Empress through marriage to Emperor Otto II. As the trusted political partner of her husband and later the regent of her young son Otto III, she left a remarkable legacy as one of the most powerful female rulers of the Ottonian era as well as of the Holy Roman Empire's history in general. Her reign is associated with the exchange of political, religious and cultural ideas and international activities between the Western Empire and the East, including the Byzantine Empire as well as the Slavic countries. Although the empress's personal role in some aspects of these processes (especially the contact between the Macedonian Renaissance and Ottonian Renaissance) is a subject of debate, she is often depicted in historiography and (recently revitalized) artistic portrayals as a cultured, spirited woman who had to adapt to a difficult situation after her husband's death and whose political vision was unfulfilled due to the early deaths of herself and her son. This image is also influenced by the masculine posture she adopted in her lifetime as coimperatrix and even imperator (she was the only Roman-German empress associated with these titles).

== Historiography ==
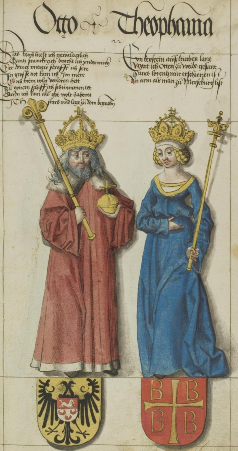
Theophanu and Otto II in Das Sächsische Stammbuch - Mscr.Dresd.R.3. Illustration by Lucas Cranach

There is discussion regarding whether her title coimperatrix and the power associated with it were the result of Frankish and Saxon traditions or Byzantine influence. On one hand, it seems the portrayal of a female counterpart to an imperator or emperor had Byzantine origins, her education blended Byzantine and Ottonian element with some authors such as Simon MacLean opine that the Ottonian court played the main role. Harper Norris notes that, "The Ottonians were a Saxon dynasty, and the grants of land two years into her consortship highlight that Theophanu was being vested with power as a Saxon ruler, connecting her to the rest of the Saxon line".

Giulia Bellato remarks that like her mother-in-law Adelheid, Theophanu relied on a network that went beyond their already advantageous roles as mothers and wives of the emperors, whose stronger authority supported them. Even when being sidelined or even pushed out of official functions, they could rely on association with the magnates, friends and ecclesiastical connections, such as when Theophanu wielded power in Pavia.

Bunker opines that while in her lifetime, Theophanu benefitted from an empowered concept of female rulership inherited from Adelheid, the latter's longevity and popularity partly negated her posthumous legacy, even though Theophanu influenced imperial policy even in death through her descendants.

Reacted to Gerd Althoff's image of the empress as a conservative ruler whose reign was marked by reaction rather than design, Maclean notes that in widowhood, Theophanu did face difficulties because she was an outsider like Editha previously and because the title of consors (working partner of the emperor) was available to powerful men who might usurp it if they were strong enough, and that the charters issued in Otto III's minority "were intended to shape alliances and thus help Theophanu intervene decisively in the complicated politics of the succession crisis and the related struggle for Lotharingia—but at the same time they were couched in a conservative language of confirmation, friendship, and the continuing authority of the late emperor." But there was a change after June 985, when Henry the Quarrelsome totally submitted to Otto III's authority. MacLean opine that the title she used in 989 Theophanius gratia divina imperator augustus (she had been consors regni from the start of her marriage even though at this point her husband's title was only "king"; she became coimperatix in 974 and soon after that coimperatrix augusta) displayed "an autonomous, masculine, imperial status", and was "not only a sign of her own confidence or a manifestation of her Byzantine identity, but also an attempt to outface her mother-in-law by appropriating the collective authority of the "dominae", for herself." Jestice claims that the fact she could claim power as regent and then passed intact authority to her son was "an extraordinary tribute to the power and position of the women of the Ottonian family.", as the situation in 984 worked against a female regent: the cream of the imperial army was already destroyed in the 982 Battle of Stilo; this was followed by the 983 Slavic rebellion that "erased decades of Ottonian advances into Slavic lands"; Theophanu was still seen as Greek and did not even have physical control of her son. Jestice opines that the fact there were essentially no rebellions from the nobles shows that basically people and institutions accepted both the monarch and his regent. Knut Görich agrees with Phyllis Jestice that Theophanu's defeat of Henry the Quarrelsome in 984 was the clearest evidence for her authority.

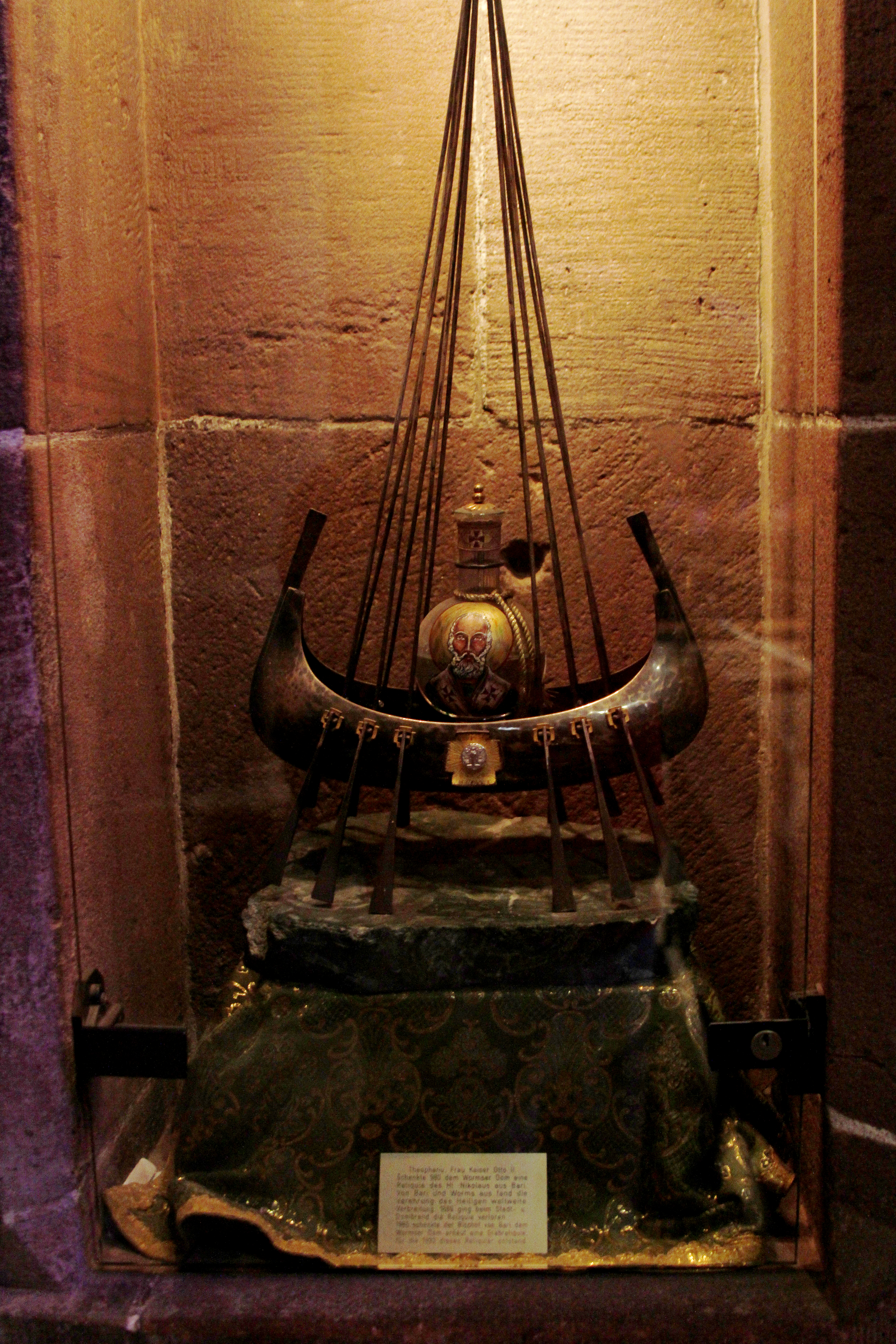
Relics of Saint Nicholas of Bari gifted by Theophanu, Holy Roman Empress -Worms Cathedral

Economou writes that the greatest achievement of her regency was maintaining peace and preventing upheavals by revolts (which allowed interstate commercial and cultural life to develop, which brought prosperity to cities such as Magdeburg), as well as her cultural work, such as the introduction of Byzantine protocol in Germany. She was also able to maintain German supremacy in Bohemia, by forcing Boleslaus II, Duke of Bohemia to accept Otto III's authority.

Odilo Engels opines that Theophanu managed to combining the task of stabilizing the border after Otto II's defeat at Capo Colonna (Battle of Stilo), which included achievements such as preventing a French invasion, and initializing new concepts. She aimed at conversion of the empire of Kiev and development of Christianity in Poland – this was why she focused on the strategic position of the Memleben Abbey and gave open support for Mieszko I in Poland, thus fighting the Liutizes (Liutizi) and Bohemians every year since 985. Her concept proved incompatible with that of Adelheid, thus they could not reconcile and Theophanu tried to assert herself in Italy at the expense of Adelheid's authority.

Johannes Fried sees Theophanu's eastern policy as "passive", considering that the troops that fought both the Liutizes and the Bohemians were just Saxon noble contingents instead of being "imperial". Jestice argues that the campaign could have been "both imperial and predominantly Saxon in nature". She points out two major evidences of Theophanu's personal role in the wars against the Slavs during her regency. The first one is a letter written by Gerbert of Aurillac, the future Pope Sylvester II, to Abbot Raimund of Aurillac around September 986—January 987. Gerbert reports on the successful summer eastern expedition of Otto III, who had led his army against the Wends (the Wends were a member of the Liutizi confederation). "Otto", with "his presence and by the strength of his soldiery", had demolished 46 fortified settlements. According to Gerbert, a new expedition was being prepared, and Theophanu had ordered Gerbert to give his report to Saxony in March. Gerbert himself would command troops from Bobbio in Italy (this meant the imperial government had been summoning troops from areas other than Saxony too) in the new campaign. The second evidence is Thietmar's account of Theophanu's involvement in the conflicts between Mieszko and Boleslaus: Mieszko asked for help from Theophanu, who sent Margrave Ekkehard of Meißen, Archbishop Giselher of Magdeburg and two Saxon counts, although Archbishop Giselher made a deal with Boleslaus instead of fighting him and the German effort to make peace failed. Theophanu's embassy to Kiev in 990 also showed her concern with the events of the Slavic world.

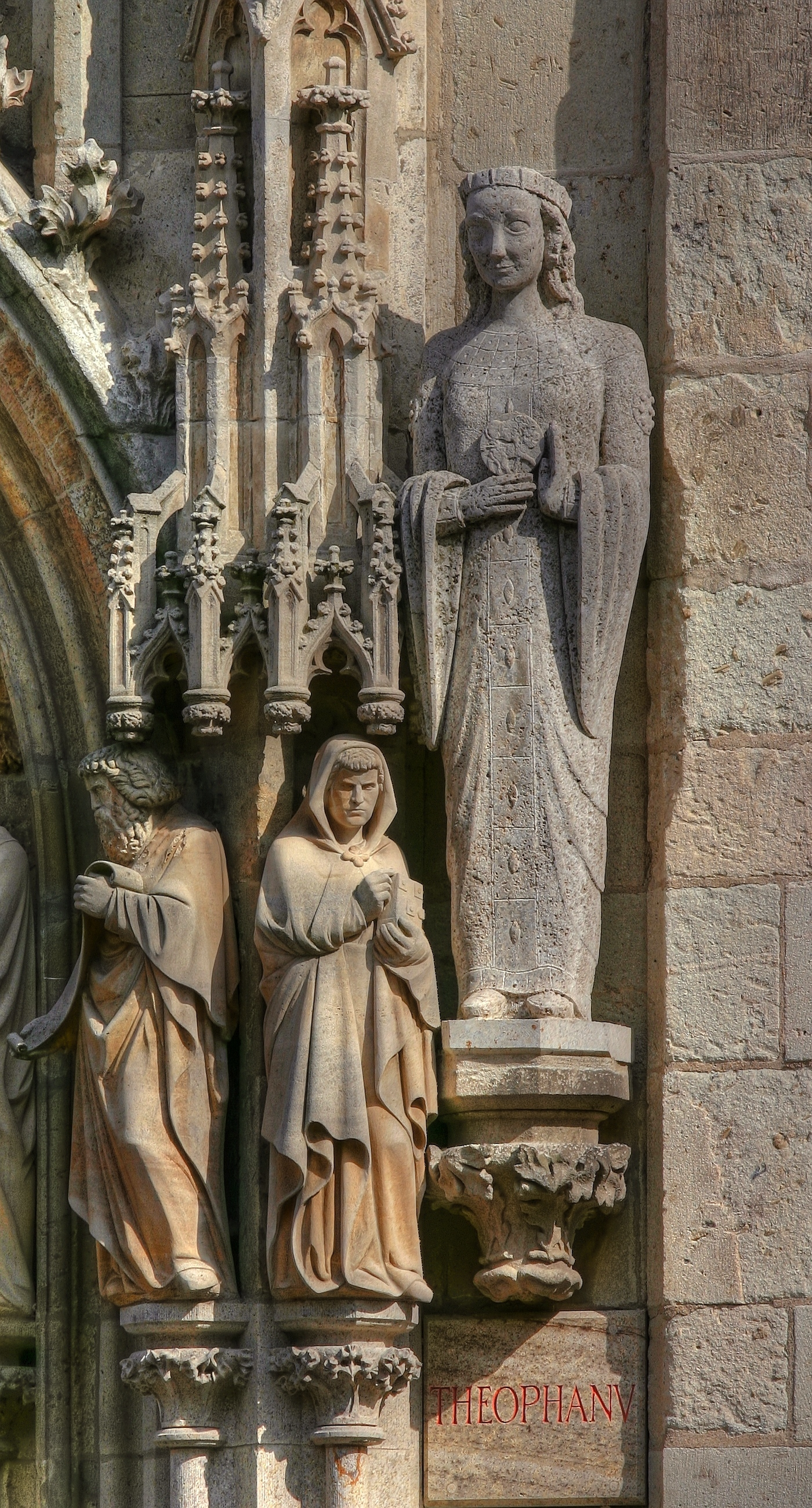
Theophanu, Rathausturm (City Hall Tower), Cologne

Azat Ordukhanyan opines that one of her most notable contributions was a concept of a Pan-European state system, and she did try to realize this in her lifetime. Bunker opines that Theophanu did not try to change the Western empire drastically. She herself adapted to the West's conditions and tried to gradually introduce Byzantine ideas and institutions, hoping that eventually the process would be accomplished through her son Otto III. Unfortunately, Theophanu's and Otto III's early deaths put an end to this plan as well as any hope that a unified Roman empire could be recreated. Religious revival in the West also started to paint the Byzantine Empire as corrupted. Herrin agrees that the deaths of Theophanu and Otto III changed history, but opines that Theophanu did at least manage to introduce novel ideas in the West and thus fulfilled exceptionally an ambassador's role for the Byzantine culture.

Regarding her lack of religious honour in comparison with other notable Ottonian women like Matilda of Ringelheim, Adelheid and Kunigunde of Luxembourg, Jestice writes that, "Theophanu failed to win a posthumous reputation for holiness, which probably had more to do with lack of anyone to promote a cult after her son's death than any failure in her lifetime." Gunther Wolf is credited with demonstrating the founding role of the empress in establishing the cult of Saint Nicholas in the West.

- Davids, Adelbert (15 August 2002). The Empress Theophano: Byzantium and the West at the Turn of the First Millennium. Cambridge University Press. ISBN 978-0-521-52467-4.
- Economou, Emmanouel-Marios-Lazaros (2021). Kaiserin Theophano's: The political, economic and cultural deeds of a Byzantine princess who became empress of the Holy Roman Empire of the German Nation (PDF). University of Thessaly.
- Theophano d'Allemagne; Euw, Anton von; Schreiner, Peter (1991). Kaiserin Theophanu: Begegnung des Ostens und Westens um die Wende des ersten Jahrtausends : Gedenkschrift des Kölner Schnütgen-Museums zum 1000. Todesjahr der Kaiserin (in German). Das Museum.
- Fössel, Amalie (2011). Die Kaiserinnen des Mittelalters (in German). Verlag Friedrich Pustet. ISBN 978-3-7917-2360-0.

Review by Christine Kleinjung (German)

- Jestice, Phyllis G. (12 April 2018). Imperial Ladies of the Ottonian Dynasty: Women and Rule in Tenth-Century Germany. Springer. ISBN 978-3-319-77306-3.

Review by Knut Görich

- Fried, Johannes (1993). Kaiserin Theophanu und das Reich (in German). Böhlau.
- Fussbroich, Helmut (1991). Kaiserin Theophanu: Prinzessin aus der Fremde : des Westreichs Grosse Kaiserin (in German). Böhlau. ISBN 978-3-412-05491-5.
- MacLean, Simon (2017). Ottonian Queenship. Oxford University Press. ISBN 978-0-19-880010-1.
- Merseburgensis, Thietmarus; Merseburg, Thietmar av (6 July 2001). Ottonian Germany: The Chronicon of Thietmar of Merseburg. Manchester University Press. ISBN 978-0-7190-4926-2.
- Wolf, Gunther (1991). Kaiserin Theophanu. Prinzessin aus der Fremde.

== Legends ==
- Thietmar of Merseburg links Theophanu's desire to salvate her dead husband's soul to an anecdote: In her sleep, Theophanu was visited by the nocturnal apparition of St.Lawrence, with one amputated arm. The saint asked her to amend the injustice which her husband had inflicted on him. Through this story, Thietmar alluded that Theophanu was a benefactress for Merseburg and a courageous, pious woman who made the right decision for the sake of her husband.
- Otloh of Sankt Emmeram (c. 1010 – c. 1072) was a great critic of the empress. His Liber Visionum as well as a codex containing the Life of Bernward of Hildesheim record the story of a nun, who had a vision, in which Theophanu appeared and lamented her agony in hell. She was punished for the introduction of Greek luxury and jewellery into the Empire, thus leading the womenfolk into sin. Against this background though, the emperor Henry III of the Salian dynasty, Otloh's contemporary, "wanted to link his descent with Theophanu's name and for this very reason imitate Byzantine manners and styles".

== Depictions in arts ==
=== Contemporary arts ===
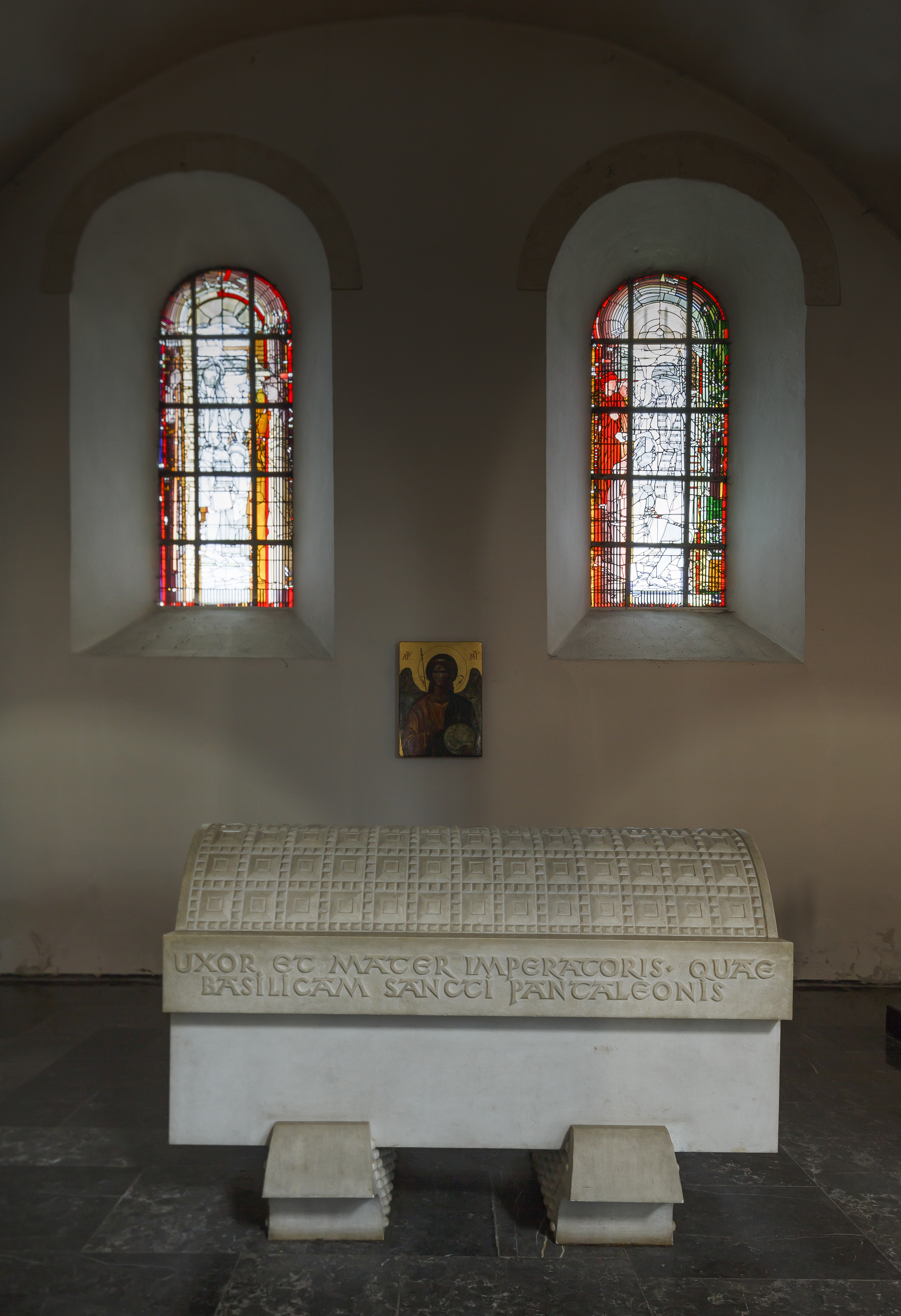
Sarcophagus of Theophanu in the St-Pantaleon's Church, Cologne

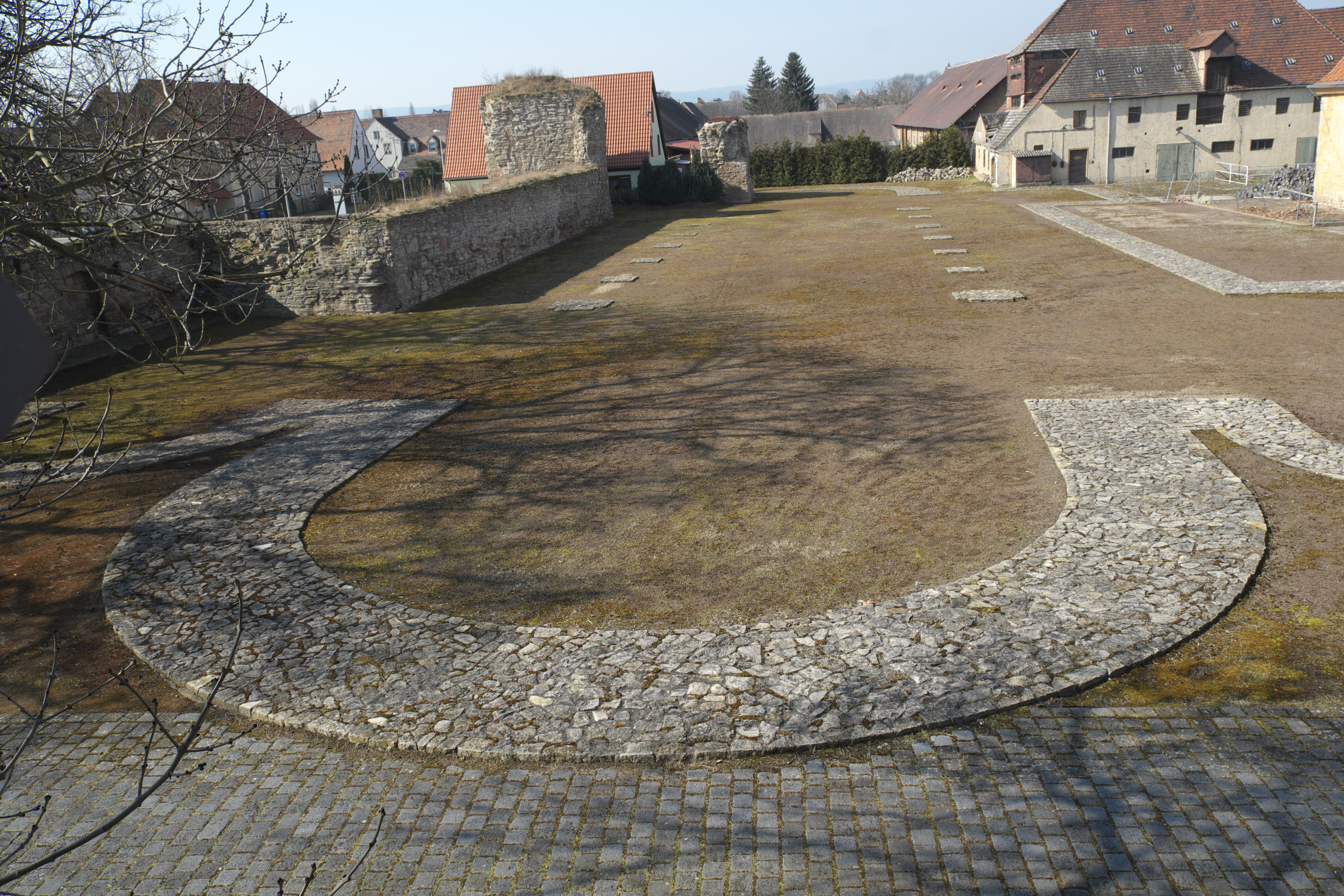
Foundation of the Memleben Abbey

The marriage between Theophanu and Otto II was the encounter point between the Macedonian Renaissance and the Ottonian Renaissance, although Theophanu's personal role in this process is disputed. Jacqueline Lafontaine-Dosogne emphasizes the impact of the Macedonian Renaissance on the Ottonian Renaissance: " In a number of cases Byzantine objects have been given a new setting or put to a new use. In the history of artistic interaction between Byzantium and the West, the period of Theophano left its mark; not until the Crusades flooded Europe with Byzantine objects, especially after the taking of Constantinople by the Latins in 1204, would the West receive such generous exposure to the rich influence of the material culture of Byzantium.", while E.Voordeckers opines that the marriage let to the merging of the two movements while denying Theophanu's personal agency. Despite her role in the reception of Byzantine cultural influence being the subject of great debate, Theophanu was nevertheless a prominent patron of arts and architecture.

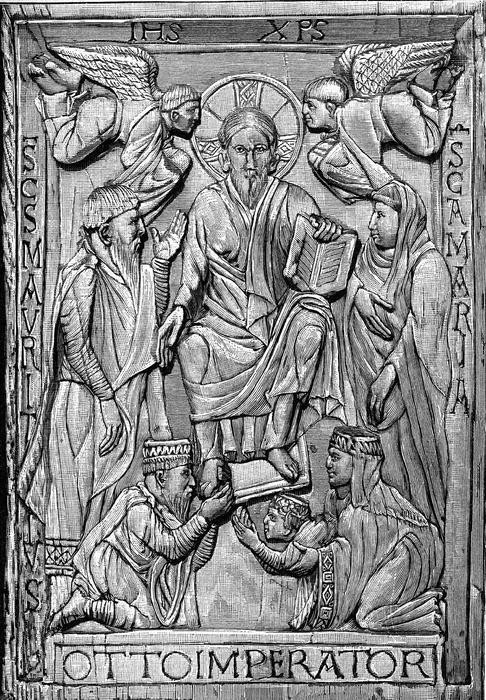
Christ, Ottonian imperial pair and their son (the pair might be Otto I and Adelheid but more generally believed to be Otto II and Theophanu, likely made in 983. Otto II "receives superiority of place" as he is positioned at Christ's right hand, but Theophanu's head is a bit higher; their crowns show the similar style. Jestice opines that the image show a ruling family, instead of focusing on a sole ruler).

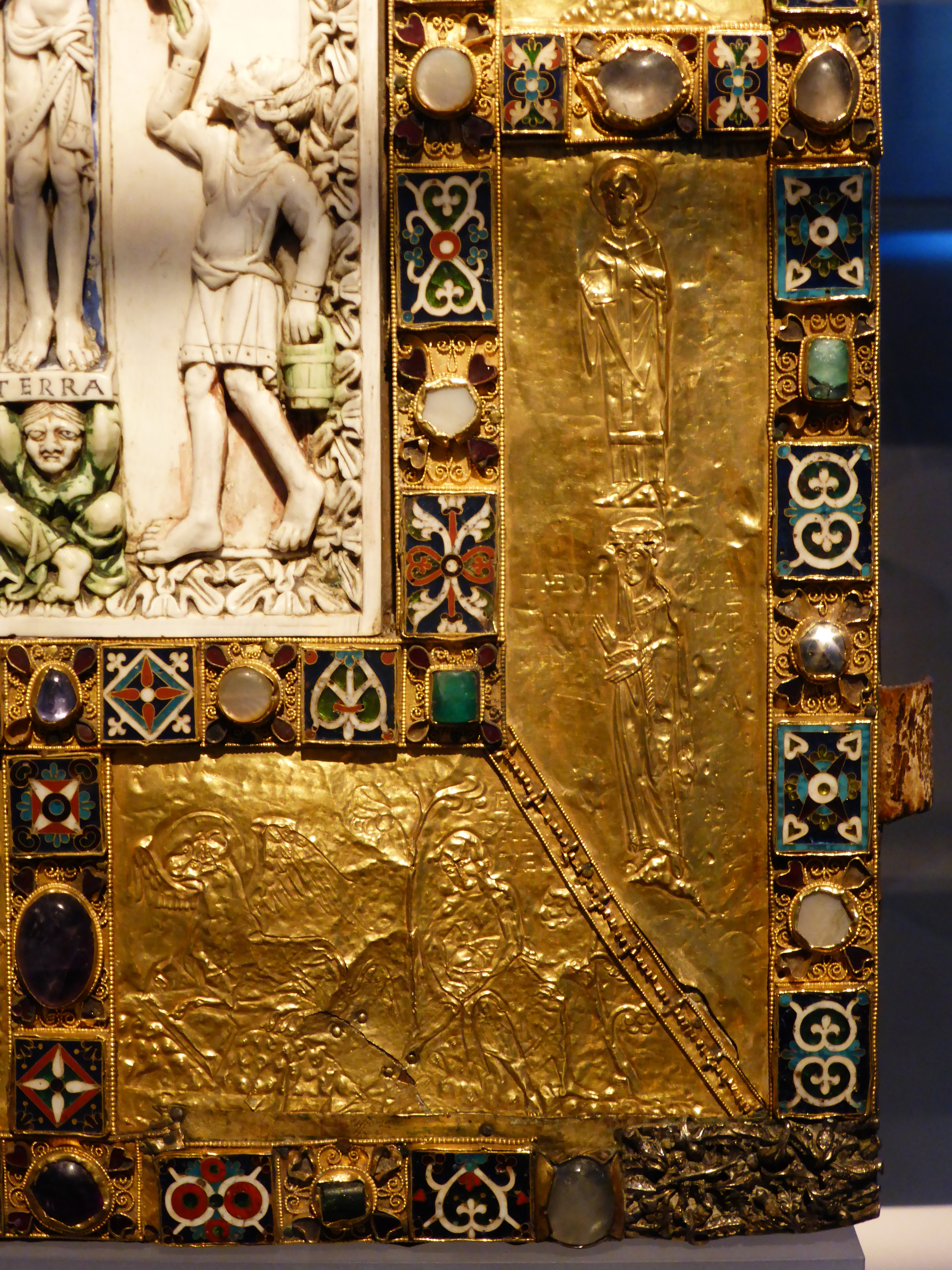
Codex Aureus of Echternach (detail of the cover, with Theophanu at the lower right)

Jestice notes that "What makes Ottonian portrayals of rulership distinctive is that the women of the ruling house were often included. In western Europe before Theophanu there are hardly any artistic representations of ruling women.71 That situation was transformed in the latter years of the tenth century, however. Images of Theophanu were especially prevalent, but Adelheid and their successors Kunigunde, Gisela, and Agnes are also represented in art"

Only a few of the Ottonian architectural projects survive. Saint Pantaleon's Church, Cologne still retains the architectural layout and some important relics from the time of Theophanu, although the rich sculptural decoration has been damaged."

The (now ruined) Memleben Abbey, established by Theophanu and Otto II, had an unusual size and was perhaps intended as an Imperial Mausoleum.

Cohen opines that the Marriage Charter of Empress Theophanu is "the most spectacular monument associated with Theophano [...], standing over four feet tall and written in gold and silver ink on dyed purple parchment."

=== Later depictions ===
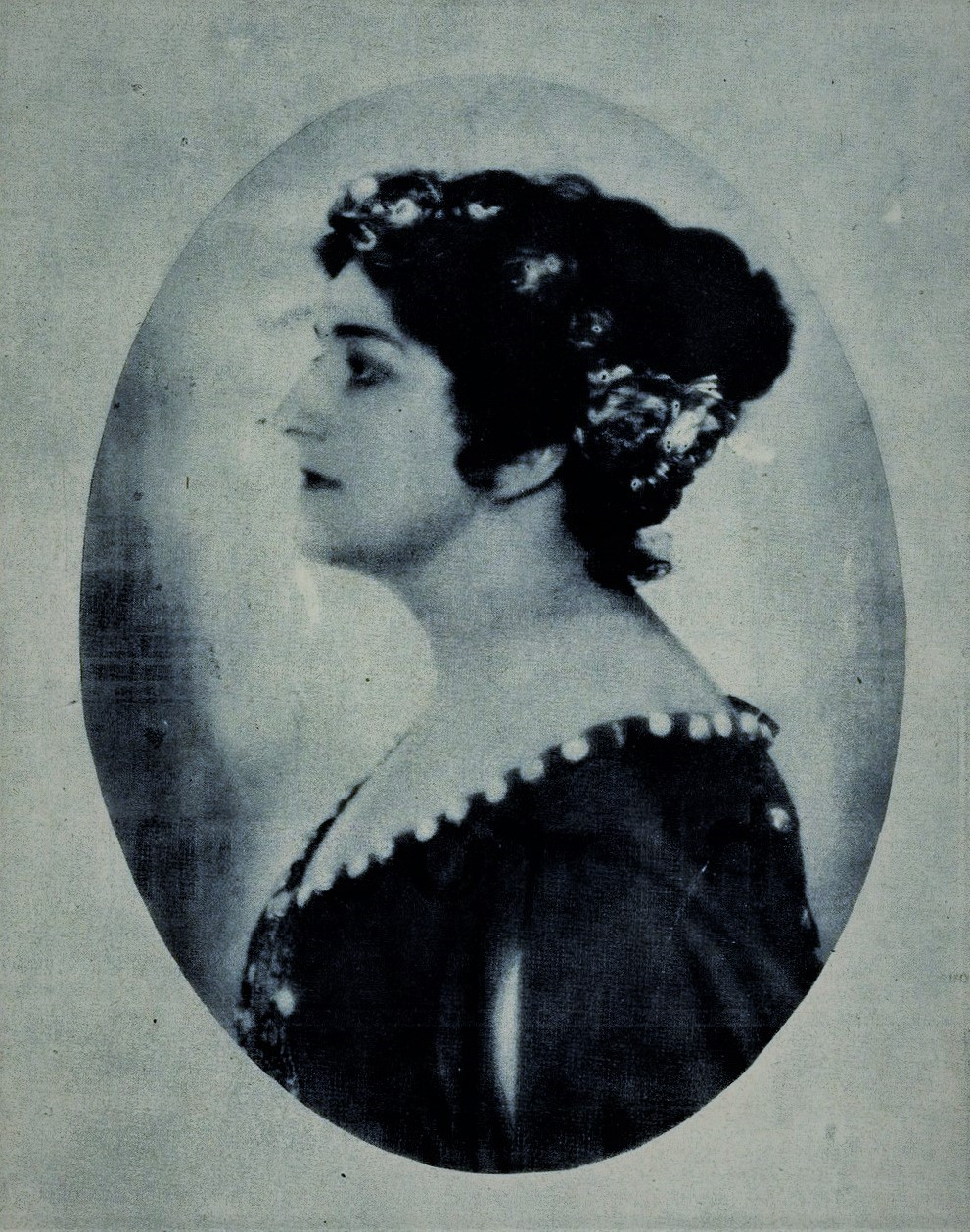
Berta Morena as Theophanu in the eponymous opera by Paul Graener, 1918

==== Operas ====
- Georg Friedrich Händel wrote Otto und Theophano or Ottone (1723), an opera in three acts about her and Otto II's marriage.
- Paul Graener wrote the three-act opera Theophano about her in 1918.

==== Prose ====
- Albert H. Rausch, writing under the name Henry Benrath, was the first author who tried to give a lively portrait of Theophanu, with his novel Die Kaiserin Theophano. Benrath considers Theophanu the most German of all the empresses, even though she came from the Byzantine Empire, and opines that her death was a great tragedy for the history of the Western empire.
- Άννα και Θεοφανώ: Πριγκίπισσες στα ξένα (German: Kaiserin Theophano. Ein Geschenk aus Byzanz: Historischer Roman, translated by Brigitte Münch) is a 2004 novel about Theophanu by the Russian-Greek author Kira Sinou.
- She is a character in Kathrin Lange's 2005 Jägerin der Zeit.
- Kaiserin Theophano: Roman aus der Byzantiner Zeit is a 2005 novel by Oskar Mysing.
- Theophanu, von Gottes Gnaden Kaiserin: Roman is a 2006 novel about Theophanu by Petra Welzel.
- Beate Sauer's Der Stern der Theophanu is a 2009 novel about the life of the empress. Rita Dell'Agnese comments that the author is solidly and sensitively persuasive when presenting Theophanu's and Otto II's relationship as a happy intercultural marriage and partnership, and arousing interest in the empress, but she criticizes the novel for overshooting its marks in conforming to "the modern desire for shocking images".
- The Swiss author Gabrielle Alioth wrotes Die griechische Kaiserin (2011) and Die Braut aus Byzanz: historischer Roman about her.
- Rosen für Theophanu. Braut Ottos II. - Kaiserin des Abendlandes: Historischer Roman is a 2018 novel about Theophanu, who had to fight for her political survival in a foreign court and the farmgirl Jutta who witnessed the birth of Otto III. The work is written by Günter Krieger.
- Eberhard Horst's Geliebte Theophanu: Der Lebensroman einer deutschen Kaiserin aus Byzanz is a biographical novel about Theophanu.
- The 2019 novel The Eagle's Daughter by Judith Tarr is about the story of Theophanu. The other two books in the author's Three Queens series are about Melisende, Queen of Jerusalem; Cleopatra and Mark Antony.

==== Films ====
- Adelheid und Theophanu – Zwei Kaiserinnen is a 2021 short animation film by Ute Helmbold made for the exhibition Die Kaiser und die Säulen ihrer Macht als Online-Ausstellung.
- Kaiserin Theophanu - Die mächtigste Frau des Abendlandes is Episode 1 of the sixth season of the series Geschichte Mitteldeutschlands (MDR / 2004).

== Commemoration ==
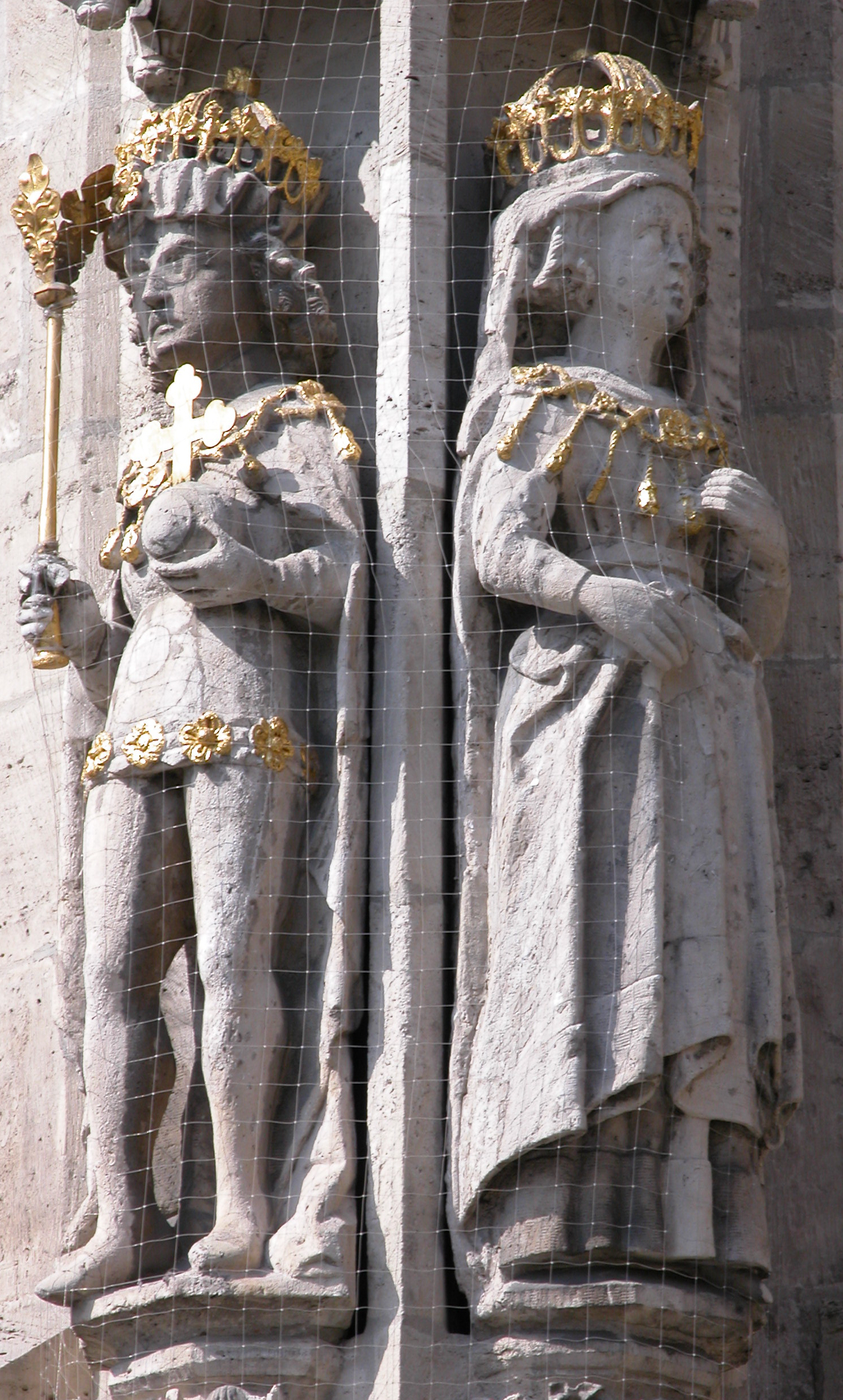
Otto II und Theophanu, Altstadtrathaus, Braunschweig

As Theophanu descended from Armenian aristocracy, she has become a modern symbol of integration for Armenians living in Germany.

In 2007, a FrauenOrt in Magdeburg was created and dedicated to Theophanu together with Adelaide and Editha.

Kaiserin-Theophanu-Schule is a Gymnasium named after her in Cologne.

In 2022, Wichelen celebrates the 1050th year of the event of its bestowal on Theophanu as a dowry gift (also the first time the town was mentioned in a historical document). A month-long commemoration of her is being organized.

== See also ==
- Cultural depictions of Adelaide of Italy
- Cultural depictions of Otto I, Holy Roman Emperor
- Cultural depictions of Otto III, Holy Roman Emperor
- Cultural depictions of Gisela of Swabia
- Cultural depictions of Empress Matilda
- Cultural depictions of Barbara of Cilli

== Bibliography and further reading ==
- Grégoire, Réginald (2000). Theofano. Una bizantina sul trono del sacro romano impero (in Italian). Editoriale Jaca Book. ISBN 978-88-16-43510-0.
- Deeters, Walter (1973). Zur Heiratsurkunde der Kaiserin Theophanu (in German).
- Fried, Johannes (1991). Theophanu und die Slawen: Bemerkungen zur Ostpolitik der Kaiserin (in German).
- Herrin, Judith (11 March 2013). Unrivalled Influence: Women and Empire in Byzantium. Princeton University Press. ISBN 978-0-691-15321-6.
- Schulze, Hans K. (2007). Die Heiratsurkunde der Kaiserin Theophanu: die griechische Kaiserin und das römisch-deutsche Reich 972-991 (in German). Hahn. ISBN 978-3-7752-6124-1.
- Steinberger, Alfons (1911). Kaiserin Theophano: Ein Lebensbild aus der zweiten Hälfte des zehnten Jahrhunderts (in German). Manz.
