= Luther in Worms (Meinardus) =

1876 German-language oratorio by Ludwig Meinardus

Luther in Worms is an 1876 German-language oratorio by Ludwig Meinardus to a libretto by Wilhelm Rossmann. The work received several performances around the time of the Martin Luther anniversary year 1883. The historical opposition of Emperor Charles V to the Reformation is mitigated by the invention of a villain, Glapio, to oppose Luther.
