= Marriage Charter of Empress Theophanu =

972 dower document for Byzantine princess Theophanu

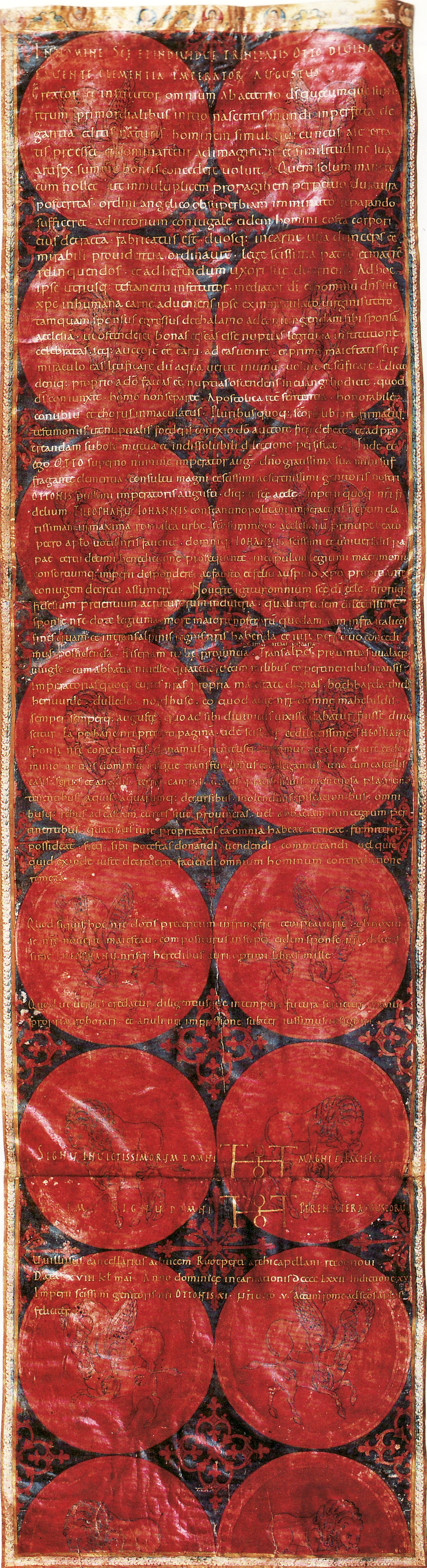
The Marriage Charter of Empress Theophanu, prepared by Holy Roman Emperor Otto II on 14 April 972

The Marriage Charter of Empress Theophanu (State Archives of Wolfenbüttel, 6 Urk 11) is the dower document for the Byzantine princess Theophanu. Written in Latin, the document was created after the marriage of Theophanu to Emperor Otto II in 972, which made her the empress of the Holy Roman Empire. The document was prepared by Otto II and exemplifies an instance of political and cultural contact between the Holy Roman Empire and the Byzantine Empire.

It serves as an example of Ottonian Renaissance art, and the calligraphy of the manuscript has led it to be regarded as one of the most beautiful diplomatic documents of the Middle Ages. In 2005, the document was proposed for inclusion in the Memory of the World Register, but was not included.

== Historical context ==
After the fall of the Western Roman Empire, the Eastern Roman Empire (in modern times also called the Byzantine Empire) remained the surviving continuation of the Roman Empire in its eastern provinces. Charlemagne's imperial coronation in 800 put strain on Western relations with the Byzantine Empire ruled from Constantinople. When Otto I became emperor in February 962, there was contention between him and the Byzantine Empire, and this issue revived in 967 between Otto and Nikephoros II Phokas over the dominion of Italy. On 25 December 967, Pope John XIII anointed Otto II as Otto I's co-emperor.

In autumn 968, battles between the Holy Roman Empire and the Byzantine Empire commenced in the Principality of Capua, in the Duchy of Benevento and Apulia, and hostilities continued until 970. Both sides of the conflict made many attempts to find a diplomatic solution. Otto I intended to receive recognition of his title in Byzantium, and to clarify the borders of Western and Eastern allegiances in southern Italy. He wanted this agreement to be ratified by the marriage of his son, Otto II, to a member of the Byzantine imperial family. Anna, daughter of the deceased Emperor Romanos II, was considered a possible bride. However, Emperor Nikephoros II Phokas was unwilling to marry off a purple-born princess (i.e. a child born to a reigning emperor). After tough negotiations with Nikephoros II Phokas' successor John I Tzimiskes, Archbishop of Cologne Gero secured the marriage of Otto II with Theophanu, a member of the Byzantine imperial family who was not, however, born to the purple.

The Marriage Charter acts as the reference document for the wedding of the 17-year-old Otto II and the 12-year-old Theophanu. The wedding took place on 14 April 972 in St. Peter's Basilica and was officiated by Pope John XIII. Politically, the marriage marked the recognition of the Ottonian Empire by the Byzantine Empire. In this document, Otto II granted Theophanu the right to an extensive dower for personal use throughout her life (legitima dos), as well as her entry into a consortium imperii with Otto II, meaning that both would share imperial authority over the Holy Roman Empire.

It is likely that Theophanu kept the document until the eve of her journey to Italy in October 989, at which time it is believed she placed it in Gandersheim Abbey for preservation. It was discovered and published in 1700 by writer and historian Johann Georg Leuckfeld. Gottfried Wilhelm Leibniz was among the first to recognise the historical significance of this document, and reports on it in History of Welf. After the secularisation of Gandersheim Abbey in 1811, the document was transferred to the Göttingen State and University Library. On 4 May 1820, the archives from the abbey were delivered to the treasury of the duchy of Brunswick. In 1835, the document was transferred to the State Archives of Wolfenbüttel, where it remains.

This document outlines the revenue and profits that Theophanu would receive from this marriage, and it begins with a speech similar to sermons held at weddings. The document describes what Theophanu will receive from Otto II: rights to the revenues from Istria, Pescara; Walcheren, Wichelen, Nivelles Abbey with 14000 belonging farms; and farms in Boppard, Tiel, Herford, Kyffhaeuser, and Nordhausen.

== Description ==
The document is a 144.5 by 39.5 cm (56.9 by 15.6 in) scroll consisting of three pieces of parchment glued together and rolled, and is believed to have been created in the Fulda monastery. A scientific study of the purple parchment took place in Munich in 1966, which showed that minium (red lead) and madder were used for staining the document, indicating that it was created in the Holy Roman Empire, rather than in the Byzantine Empire, where the Murex shell for making Tyrian purple was tightly controlled. This document is one of the oldest surviving examples of madder being used in the Middle Ages. The painted purple background imitates a woven Byzantine silk with fourteen circular medallions and two half medallions. The medallions contain representations of animals fighting, inspired by Near Eastern art.

The writing field is surrounded by a narrow gold trim decorated with blue and white acanthus leaves. The top edge is decorated with animals and vegetation, along with medallions containing half-figures, such as Jesus flanked by Mary and John the Baptist with four Evangelists. Between the medallions at the top are six pairs of animals. It was the first marriage document to be illuminated.

The text is written in gold in Carolingian minuscule calligraphy, and the gold ink was obtained from an alloy of silver and gold leaf. A few lines or words stand out as they are written in rustic capitals. Over time, the parchment has slightly warped, and there is a fold in the middle of the document. It is presented in a permanent exhibition of the State Archives of Lower Saxony in a dimly lit room.

Imperial purple was a colour reserved for emperors, kings and bishops, and purple parchment was rarely used for writing. This document is regarded as one of the most luxurious and beautiful examples of the use of purple parchment.

== Authenticity ==
The authenticity of this document remains a matter of debate. Hans K. Schulze and Hans Goetting believe that the document was presented by Otto II at their wedding feast, and then given to Theophanu. Walter Deeters (1972) says that the separations in the text act as reading aids, showing that the document was intended to be read. Diplomats Theodor von Sickel and Carlrichard Brühl believe that the document is not the original as it lacks a seal and the lines are unusually shaped.

== See also ==
- Cultural depictions of Theophanu
