= Heinrich Reimann =

German musicologist, organist, and composer

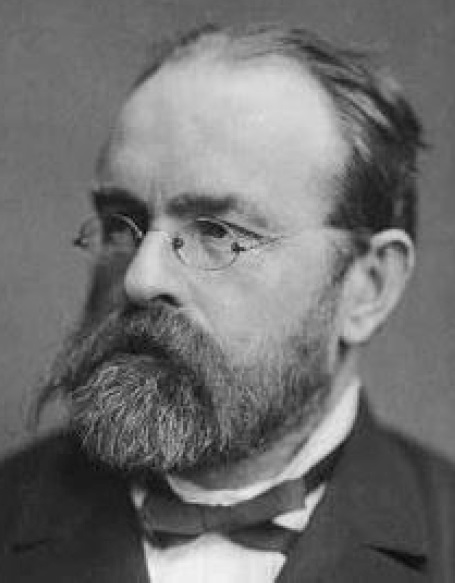
Heinrich Reimann

Heinrich Reimann (March 12, 1850 – May 24, 1906), was a German musicologist, organist, and composer.

Reimann was born in Rengersdorf, Silesia, and was a son of Ignaz Reimann, also a musician. Reimann studied at the University of Breslau and was awarded a degree in classical philology in 1875, having simultaneously studied organ with the Silesian composer and organist Moritz Brosig (1815–1887). It was only in 1886 that Reimann changed his profession to music, becoming active in Berlin as an organist, choral conductor, and write on subjects from Byzantine music through Wagner and contemporary composition. Reimann was appointed official organist for the Berlin Philharmonic where he performed on the Schlag und Söhne organ (1888), and became instructor in music theory and organ at the Klindworth-Schwarwenka-Conservatory; he was later appointed organist at the Kaiser-Wilhelm-Gedächtniskirche in 1895 (where Wilhelm Sauer's largest organ to date—Opus 660—was installed). In fact, Reimann was responsible for the addition of a fourth manual to the organ in 1897 in the form of an enclosed echo division (German: Fernwerk), which spoke through a soundproof duct and stone wall to a screen directly above the nave of the church. Reimann was one of the first organ teachers of Karl Straube (the latter studying perhaps on the Schlag und Söhne organ), who became Reimann's assistant at the Gedächtniskirche upon Reimann's appointment. It was Reimann who first introduced Straube to the music of Max Reger (then a student of Hugo Riemann in composition at Weiden). Reimann died in Berlin.
