= Anna Schuppe =

Anna Marie Wilhelmine Antonie Leopoldine Benfey Schuppe (September 19, 1829 – May 27, 1903) was an Austrian author and composer who wrote songs, operas, and music for theatre. She published under the names Anna Benfey Schuppe and Anna Benfey.

Schuppe was born in Landeck. Her music teachers included Georg Bierling (possibly Georg Vierling), Moritz Brosig, Ludwig Meinardus, and Hubert Ries. She taught at the Ursuline Convent in Glogow, Poland, then in Dresden, Germany, and in Graz, Austria. She married the writer Rudolf Benfey in 1879.

Schuppe moved to Weimar, Germany, in 1892, following her husband’s death. She continued her husband’s correspondence with the composer Franz Liszt, as well as his work on a pamphlet entitled Beethoven and Liszt.

Schuppe composed works through at least opus 7. She was best known for her incidental music for William Shakespeare’s Romeo and Juliet, which was performed in Wroclaw, Poland; Coburg, Germany; and Dresden. (N) Her publications included:

== Books ==
- Frauenfrage und das Christenthum (Women’s Question and Christianity (J)
- Frauenfrage und Madchen-Erziehung (Women’s Question and Girls’ Education (F)
- Mannergluck und Frauenfrage (Men’s Happiness and Women’s Question)

== Chamber Music ==
- pieces

== Opera ==
- Adelheid, Gemahlin Ottos des Grossen

== Theatre ==
- Overture to Goetz von Berlichingen (text by Johann Wolfgang von Goethe)
- Philippine Weiser
- Romeo and Juliet (text by Shakespeare)

== Vocal ==
- “Rastlose Liebe” (text by Goethe)
- Vier Gedichte, opus 7 (voice and piano; text by anonymous and Hermann Kletke)
