= Ivy May Bolton =

British-American Anglican nun and writer

Ivy May Bolton (born May 18, 1879, London, England – died May 9, 1961, Peekskill, New York) was an Anglican nun and writer. She was the daughter of Reginald Pelham Bolton and Kate Alice (née Behenna), and the sister of the playwright Guy Bolton.

She lived in England until she was fourteen, when the family came to the United States, settling in New York. She attended Saint Gabriel's School, a boarding school run by the Sisters of Saint Mary in Peekskill, where she graduated in 1898. She was still living at St Mary's Convent in 1900 and 1910.

In 1911 she entered the Community of St. Mary, where she took the name Sister Mercedes. She made her life vows on August 18, 1914, at the Motherhouse in Peekskill. She taught English and History in various schools run by the order, and between 1923 and 1952, she wrote more than a dozen books. She eventually retired to the Motherhouse in Peekskill, New York, where she died on May 9, 1961, at age 81.

== Bibliography ==
- The Young Knight, L. C. Page (1923)
- The Young Cavaliers: A Story of the Days when Charles was King, illustrated by Adelaide Everhart, L. C. Page (1924)
- The King’s Minstrel, A. R. Mowbray (1925) Historical novel about King Henry I of England and Rahere.
- Shadow of the Crown: A Story of Malta, illustrated by Henry Clarence Pitz, Longmans (1931)
- A Loyal Foe: A Tale of the Rival Roses, illustrated by Henry Clarence Pitz, Longmans (1933)
- Rebels in Bondage, Longmans (1938)
- A Tennessee Outpost, Longmans (1939)
- The Luck of Scotland, illustrated by Victor Dowling, Longmans (1940)
- Raeburn Unafraid, illustrated by William Merritt Berger, Longmans (1942)
- Son of the Land, Messner (1946)
- Wayfaring Lad, illustrated by Lorence F. Bjorklund, Messner (1948)
- Andrew of the Eagleheart, Gryphon (1952)
- Father Junipero Serra, illustrated by Robert Burns, Messner (1952)
