= Ludwig Meinardus =

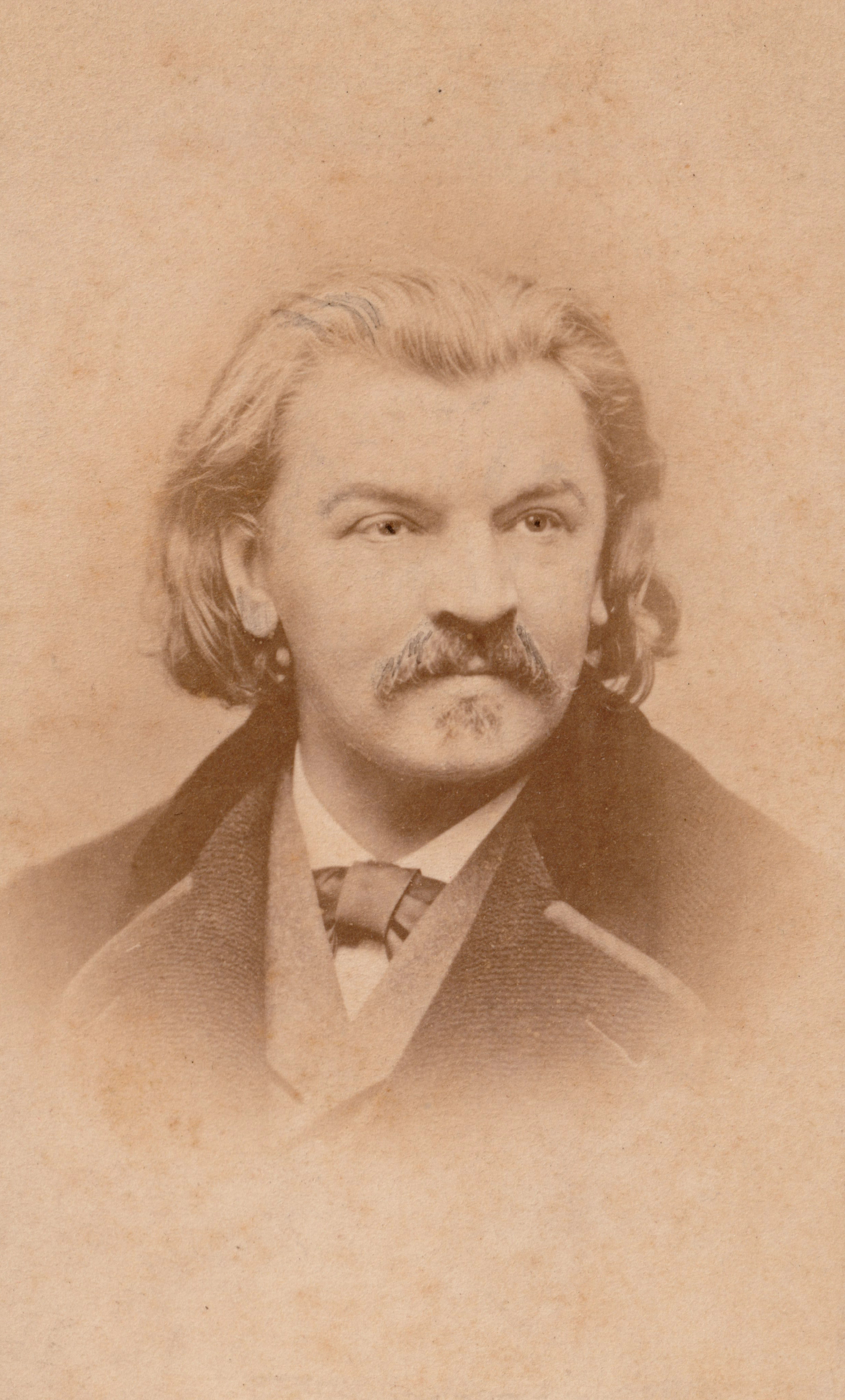
- Ludwig Meinardus in 1876

Background information
- Born: 17 September 1827; Hooksiel, Lower Saxony, Germany
- Died: 10 July 1896 (aged 68); Bielefeld, North Rhine-Westphalia, Germany
- Occupation: Composer

Ludwig Siegfried Meinardus (Hooksiel 17 September 1827 - 10 July 1896 Bielefeld) was a German composer. His students included Anna Schuppe.

== Selected works ==
=== Oratorios ===
- Simon Petrus op. 23 (1857)
- Gideon (1862)
- König Salomo op. 25 (1862/63)
- Luther in Worms (1874)
