= König Salomo (Meinardus) =

1865 German-language oratorio

König Salomo is an 1865 German-language oratorio by Mendelssohn's pupil Ludwig Meinardus, based on the story of King Solomon from 1st Book of Kings and the Song of Songs. A reduction for piano and chour was published in Bremen in 1865 and the work was first performed 9 December 1865 in Elberfeld. A full orchestral edition was restored by musicologist Norbert Klose and performed in October 2010 in Bad Oldesloe and Hohenwestedt, resulting in a recording on the Euthentic label.
