= Alessandro Gandini =

Italian artist

Alessandro Gandini was a sixteenth-century Italian artist. His most commonly known works are two chiaroscuro woodcuts called The Virgin and Child with Saints and a Donor and Christ in the House of Simon the Pharisee. The latter work is held by the Metropolitan Museum of Art.
