= Ellen Jones (novelist) =

American historical fiction novelist

Ellen Jones was the author of a trilogy of popular romantic novels, set in the time of Henry I, King Stephen and Henry II of England.

- The Fatal Crown. Simon & Schuster. 1991. ISBN 978-0671724641.
- Beloved Enemy. Simon & Schuster. 1994. ISBN 978-0671872793.
- Gilded Cages. Open Road Media Romance. 2013. ISBN 978-1453289020.

The trilogy as a whole is called The Queens of Love and War, and has been published as an omnibus edition.

- The Queens of Love and War. Open Road Media. 2013. ISBN 978-1480430624.

The first novel has also been translated into Spanish and Italian.

- La Corona Fatal. Sudamericana. 1991. ISBN 978-9500707121.
- La Corona del Destino. Mondadori. 1991. ISBN 9788804352754.

The Fatal Crown tells the story of Maud, the Empress Matilda, daughter of Henry I, who waged a bitter civil war with her cousin Stephen over the succession to the English throne. The unhistorical premise of the novel is that the young Maud and Stephen were also steamy lovers, and that Henry II was their illegitimate son.

The second two novels of the trilogy are devoted to the life of Eleanor of Aquitane and her marriage to Henry II.

Jones was born in New York City and graduated from Bennington College. She later resided in Los Angeles.
