= Berta Morena =

German operatic soprano

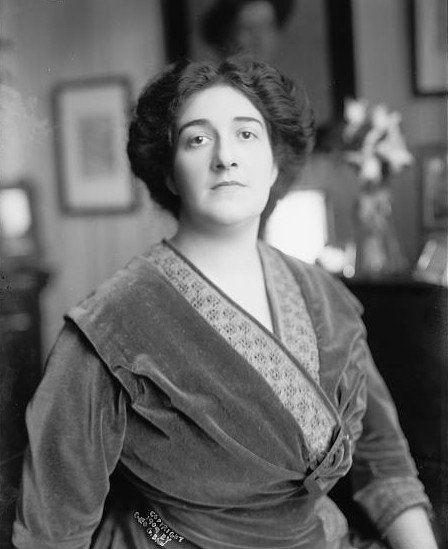
Berta Morena

Berta Morena (27 January 1878 – 7 October 1952) was a German operatic dramatic soprano.

Born Berta Meyer in Mannheim, in her youth Morena captured the attention of Franz von Lenbach, who arranged for her to sing Agatha in Der Freischütz at the Munich Opera, where she bowed in 1898 after training with Sofie Röhr-Brajnin. She saw success at once, and remained on the company's roster until 1923. Her American debut came at the Metropolitan Opera in the role of Sieglinde on March 4, 1908; the company reengaged her from 1910 to 1912 and again from 1924 until 1925. In 1914 she appeared at Covent Garden. Morena had a reputation as a great singing actress, and was especially admired for her prowess in the major soprano roles of Richard Wagner. Morena died in Rottach-Egern.
