= Cultural depictions of Henry I of England =

King Henry I of England has been portrayed in various cultural media.

== Theatre ==
Henry I of England, a play by Beth Flintoff, was first performed in November 2016 at St James's Church, Reading. The drama follows the story of the three sons of William the Conqueror and ends with the early reign of Henry I. The narrative continues in Flintoff's second play Matilda the Empress which depicts the king's later life and The Anarchy period after his death when his daughter Matilda and her cousin Stephen were rivals for the succession.

== Fictional portrayals ==
Henry I has been depicted in historical novels and short stories. They include:

- Pado, the Priest (1899) by Sabine Baring-Gould revolves around Henry's conflict with the Welsh.
- A Saxon Maid (1901) by Eliza Frances Pollard. Reportedly "a good short story of the Norman devastations", taking place in the reigns of William II and Henry I. The latter being a prominent character.
- "Old Men at Pevensey" by Rudyard Kipling, a short story included in the collection Puck of Pook's Hill (1906). Features both Henry I and Robert Curthose.
- "The Tree of Justice" by Rudyard Kipling, a short story included in the collection Rewards and Fairies (1910). Features both Henry I and Rahere.
- The King’s Minstrel (1925) by Ivy May Bolton. The title character is Rahere, depicted as "part jester, part priest, and more wizard than either". The King of the title is Henry I who is "prominently introduced".
- Henry appears in two novels by George Shipway, The Paladin (1972) and The Wolf Time (1973). In these books, Henry is depicted as organizing the death of King William II.
- Henry appears briefly in the short story "A Light on the Road to Woodstock" (1988) by Ellis Peters, one of her Brother Cadfael stories. "A Light on the Road to Woodstock" is collected in A Rare Benedictine: The Advent of Brother Cadfael.
- The Pillars of the Earth, a 1989 novel by Ken Follett, set during the Anarchy period. In the miniseries based on the book King Henry was portrayed by Clive Wood.

== Sources ==
- Nield, Jonathan (1925), A Guide to the Best Historical Novels and Tales, G. P. Putnam's sons, ISBN 0833725092
