= Karl Emil von Schafhäutl =

German naturalist and musicologist (1803–1890)

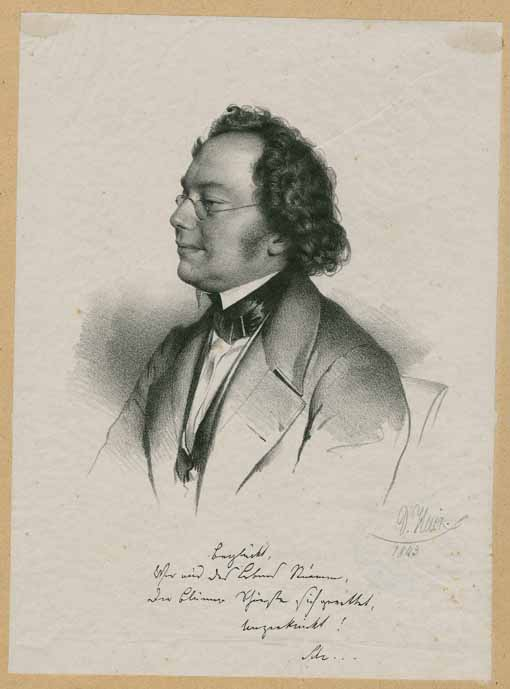
Karl Emil von Schafhäutl

Karl Franz Emil von Schafhäutl (16 February 1803 in Ingolstadt – 25 February 1890 in Munich) was a German naturalist and musicologist.

He was professor of Geognosy in Munich. He was the author of Geognostische Untersuchungen des südbayerischen Alpengebirges (1851) and Der Gregorianische Choral in seiner Entwicklung (1869). He also studied mining and foundry practise.

== Works ==
- Geognostische Untersuchungen des südbayrischen Alpengebirges Munich, 1851
- Südbayerns Lethae geognostica, Lipsia, 1863
- Die Geologie in ihrem Verhältnis zu den übrigen Naturwissenschaften Munich, 1843
- Die neuesten geologischen Hypothesen und ihr Verhältnis zu den übrigen Naturwissenschaften überhaupt, 1844
- Der echte gregorianische Choral in seiner Entwicklung bis zur Kirchenmusik unserer Zeit Munich, 1869
- Ein Spaziergang durch die liturgische Musikgeschichte der katholischen Kirche Munich, 1887
- Abt Georg Joseph Vogler, 1888 also Hildesheim; New York : Georg Olms, 1979.
