= Williams FW17 =

Formula One racing car

Williams FW17 Williams FW17B
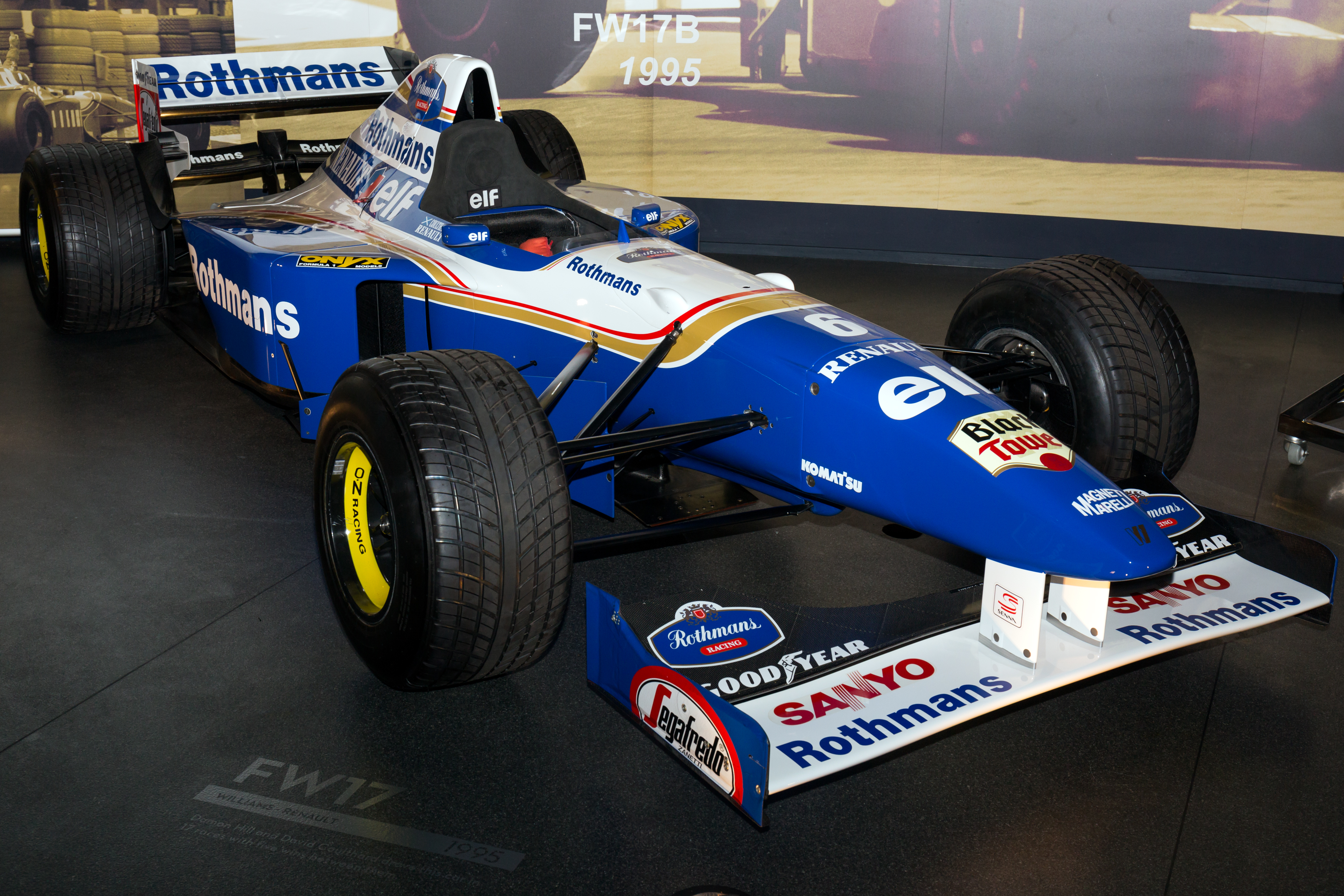
- David Coulthard's Williams FW17 on display at the Williams Museum
- Category: Formula One
- Constructor: Williams (chassis, transmission); Renault Sport (engine)
- Designers: Patrick Head (Technical Director); Adrian Newey (Chief Designer); Eghbal Hamidy (Chief Aerodynamicist); Bernard Dudot (Chief Engine Designer (Renault))
- Predecessor: FW16/FW16B/FW16C
- Successor: FW18

Technical specifications
- Chassis: Carbon fibre and Kevlar monocoque
- Suspension (front): pushrod, bellcrank, torsion spring
- Suspension (rear): pushrod, bellcrank, torsion spring
- Engine: Renault RS7, 2,992 cc (182.6 cu in), V10 (67°) NA mid-engine, longitudinally-mounted
- Transmission: Williams transverse 6-speed semi-automatic
- Power: 675–700 bhp (503–522 kW; 684–710 PS) @ 15,200-15,600 rpm
- Fuel: Elf
- Tyres: Goodyear

Competition history
- Notable entrants: Rothmans Williams Renault
- Notable drivers: 5. (United Kingdom) Damon Hill; 6. (United Kingdom) David Coulthard
- Debut: 1995 Brazilian Grand Prix
- First win: 1995 Argentine Grand Prix
- Last win: 1995 Australian Grand Prix
- Last event: 1995 Australian Grand Prix
Races	Wins	Podiums	Poles	F/Laps
17	5	17	12	6
- Constructors' Championships: 0
- Drivers' Championships: 0

The Williams FW17 is a Formula One racing car designed by Adrian Newey, with which the Williams team competed in the 1995 Formula One World Championship. It was driven by Damon Hill, who was in his third year with the team, and David Coulthard, who was in his first full season after a part-time role in 1994.

== Season performance ==
With what was regarded as the best chassis and aerodynamics in the field combined with the best engine, the 1995 season was disappointing for the team, who were beaten to both titles by Michael Schumacher and Benetton. Although the FW17 was superior in qualifying trim, taking 12 pole positions, Schumacher was usually more competitive on race day. The Benetton team arguably made better strategy decisions during races and Schumacher was able to win nine races against Hill and Coulthard's combined total of five. The reliability of the FW17 was also inferior to the Benetton's, with mechanical issues costing Hill victories in Brazil and Germany when comfortably leading both races as well as podium finishes in Spain and Canada. Coulthard also suffered mechanical failures which afflicted the Scotsman whilst leading in Argentina, Belgium and Italy, whilst further podium finishes were lost in Spain and Monaco. Despite the setbacks, Hill fought Schumacher for the title for the second year in a row, taking wins in Argentina, San Marino, Hungary and Australia. However, Hill's title challenge was blunted after being involved in high profile collisions with Schumacher whilst both were battling over the lead in Britain and second place in Italy as their rivalry intensified across the season. Meanwhile, Coulthard took his first and only victory for Williams in Portugal to keep the team in title contention. Unfortunately, both drivers went on to make several unforced errors across the second half of the season which saw Schumacher and Benetton wrap up both titles during the Japanese double-header.

== History ==
For qualifying at the Portuguese Grand Prix, the Williams FW17B was debuted, although not used for the race itself. In the final four races of the season, the FW17B took three pole positions and one victory, but the titles were already just about out of reach due to the success of Schumacher and his Benetton B195.

The team eventually finished second in the Constructors' Championship, with 112 points; both Williams and Benetton had their constructor's points deducted from the Brazilian Grand Prix (6 and 10 points respectively) following an appeal that saw both teams' fuel-related disqualifications overturned from race standings.

The FW17 is notable for being the first Williams car to race with a raised nose, and was the first 'clean sheet' design from the team since 1991 (as the car's two predecessors had been evolutions of the FW14), owing to the new technical regulations for the 1995 season.

During an interview with Top Gear in 2012, Coulthard spoke positively about the FW17, saying that it was his favourite out of the cars he had driven in his career.

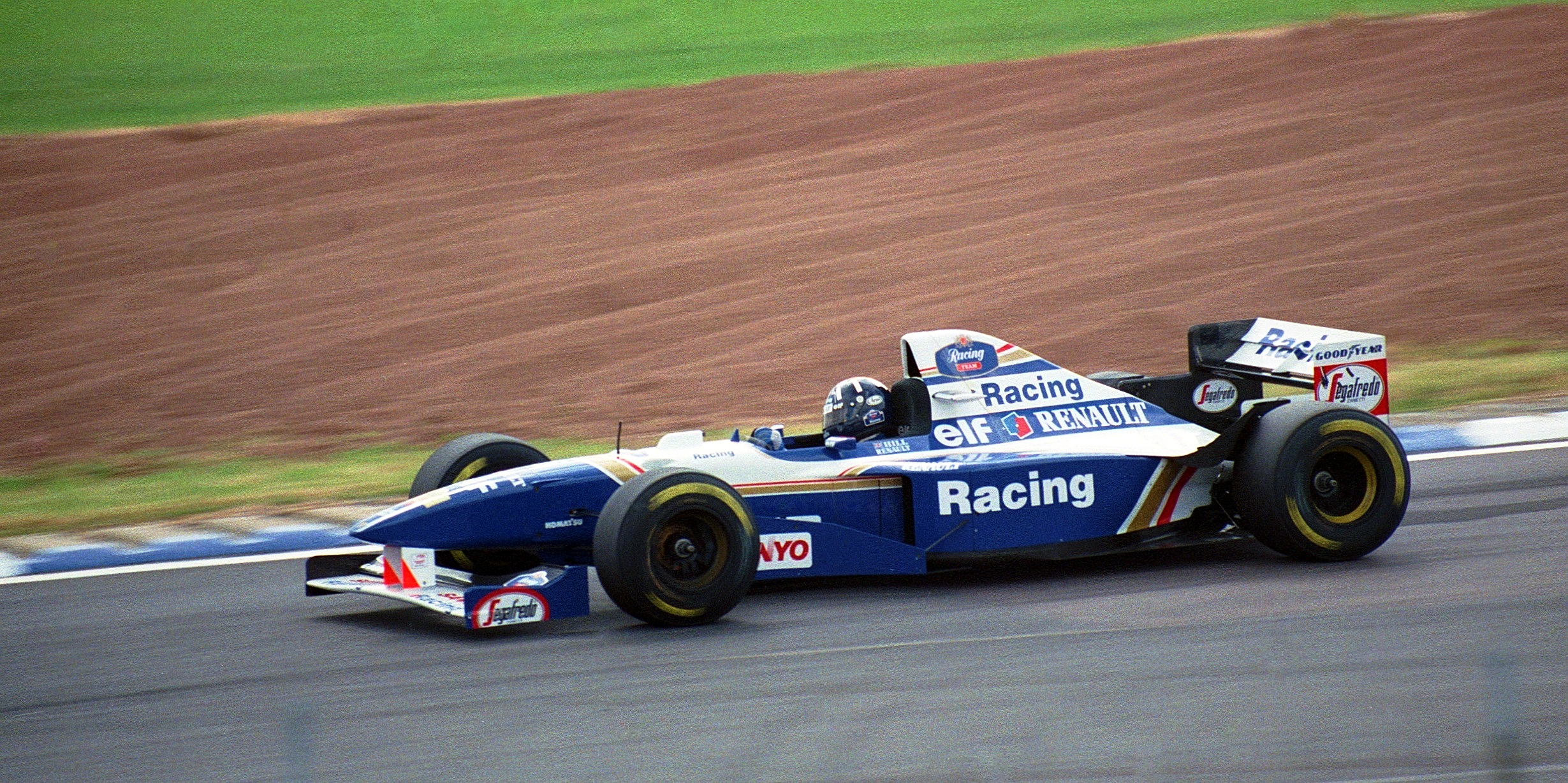
Damon Hill's FW17 at 1995 British Grand Prix

== Livery ==
For a second year, Williams had a title sponsorship deal with Rothmans. Williams used Rothmans logos, except at the French, British, German and European Grands Prix where it was replaced with 'Racing' or a barcode with a tricoloured rectangle that associated with the brand. At the French Grand Prix, the Black Tower logo was removed.

As a tribute to Ayrton Senna, who was tragically killed the previous season, the Senna 'S' logo was presented on the front wing.

== Complete Formula One results ==
(key) (results in bold indicate pole position)

Year	Team	Chassis	Engine	Tyres	Drivers	1	2	3	4	5	6	7	8	9	10	11	12	13	14	15	16	17	Pts.	WCC
1995	Rothmans Williams Renault		Renault RS7; V10	**G**		BRA	ARG	SMR	ESP	MON	CAN	FRA	GBR	GER	HUN	BEL	ITA	POR	EUR	PAC	JPN	AUS	**112**	**2nd**
1995	Rothmans Williams Renault	FW17	Renault RS7; V10	**G**	Damon Hill	**Ret**	1	1	4	**2**	Ret	**2**	**Ret**	**Ret**	**1**	2	Ret	3					**112**	**2nd**
1995	Rothmans Williams Renault	FW17B	Renault RS7; V10	**G**	Damon Hill														Ret	3	Ret	**1**	**112**	**2nd**
1995	Rothmans Williams Renault	FW17	Renault RS7; V10	**G**	David Coulthard	2	**Ret**	4	Ret	Ret	Ret	3	3	2	2	Ret	**Ret**	**1**					**112**	**2nd**
1995	Rothmans Williams Renault	FW17B	Renault RS7; V10	**G**	David Coulthard														**3**	**2**	Ret	Ret	**112**	**2nd**

– Coulthard's second place at the Brazilian Grand Prix did not count towards Constructors' Championship points as the FIA did not reinstate the constructor's points after the initial disqualification due to fuel irregularities was overturned.

== Sponsors ==
Brand	Country	Placed on
Rothmans	United Kingdom	Rear wing, fin, sidepods, front wing
Magnetti Marelli	Italy	Nose
Renault	France	Sides, nose
Elf	France	Sides, nose, mirrors
Segafredo	Italy	Side, rear wing end plate, front wing end plate
Sanyo	Japan	Front wing
Onyx	Portugal	Sidepods
Komatsu	Japan	Side
Black Tower	Germany	Nose

Awards
Preceded by Benetton B194	Autosport; Racing Car Of The Year; 1995	Succeeded by Williams FW18
