= Damon Hill =

British racing driver (born 1960)

Damon Hill OBE
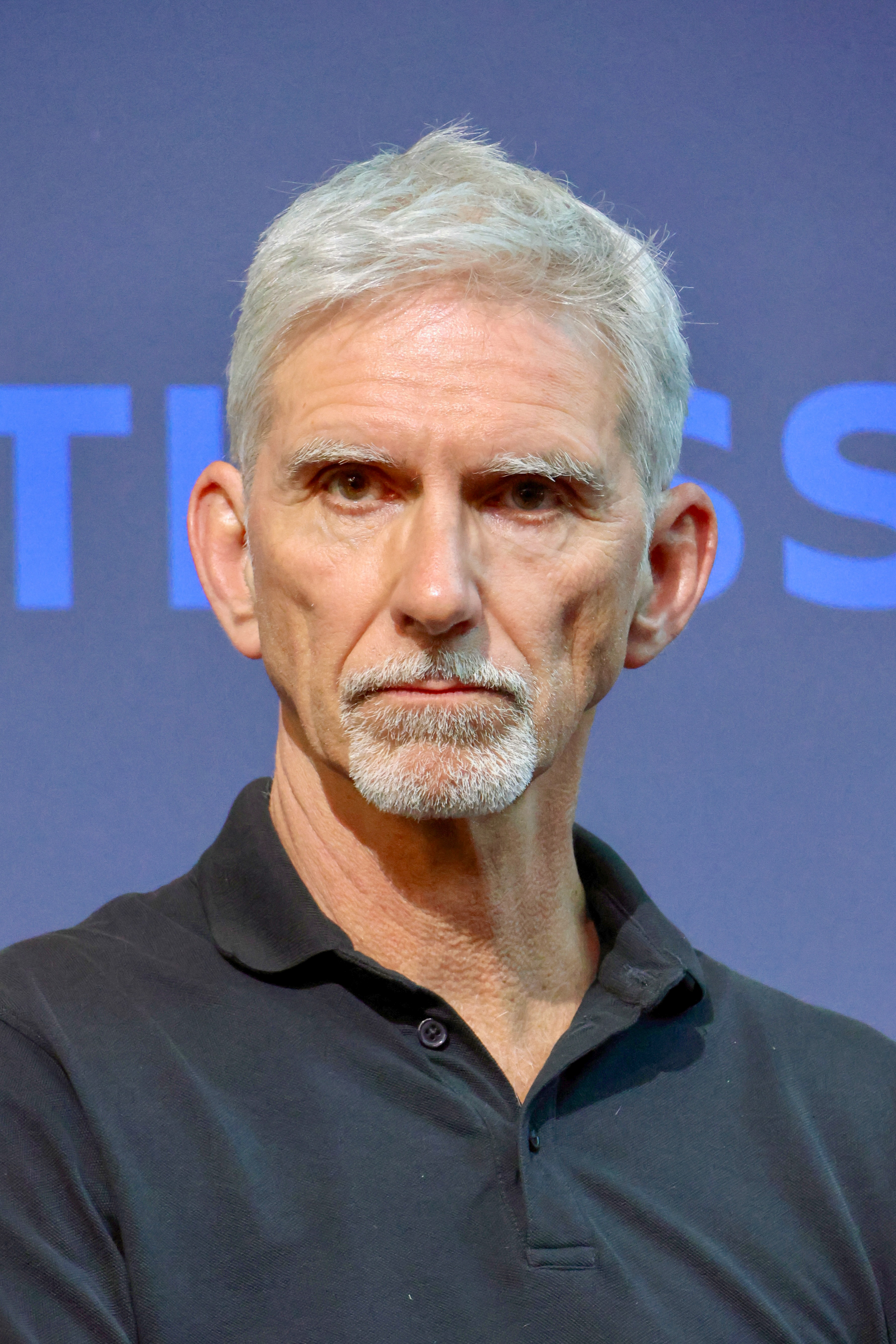
- Hill at Federation Square in 2026
- Born: Damon Graham Devereux Hill; 17 September 1960 (age 66); Hampstead, London, England
- Spouse: Susan George (m. 1988)
- Children: 4, including Josh
- Parent: Graham Hill (father)

Formula One World Championship career
- Nationality: (United Kingdom) British
- Active years: 1992–1999
- Team(s): Brabham, Williams, Arrows, Jordan
- Entries: 122 (115 starts)
- Championships: 1 (1996)
- Wins: 22
- Podiums: 42
- Career points: 360
- Pole positions: 20
- Fastest laps: 19
- First entry: 1992 Spanish Grand Prix
- First win: 1993 Hungarian Grand Prix
- Last win: 1998 Belgian Grand Prix
- Last entry: 1999 Japanese Grand Prix

Damon Graham Devereux Hill (born 17 September 1960) is a British former racing driver and broadcaster, who competed in Formula One from 1992 to 1999. Hill won the Formula One World Drivers' Championship in 1996 with Williams, and won 22 Grands Prix across eight seasons.

Born and raised in London, Hill is the son of two-time Formula One World Champion Graham Hill, and, along with Nico Rosberg, one of two sons of a Formula One World Champion to also win the title. He started racing on motorbikes in 1981, and after minor success moved on to single-seater racing cars. Hill became a test driver for the Formula One title-winning Williams team in 1992. He was promoted to the Williams race team the following year after Riccardo Patrese's departure and took the first of his 22 victories at the 1993 Hungarian Grand Prix. During the mid-1990s, Hill was Michael Schumacher's main rival for the Formula One Drivers' Championship, which saw the two clash several times on and off the track. Their collision at the 1994 Australian Grand Prix gave Schumacher his first title by a single point. Hill became champion in 1996 with eight wins, but was dropped by Williams for the following season. He went on to drive for the less competitive Arrows and Jordan teams, and in 1998 gave Jordan their first win.

Hill retired from racing after leaving Jordan following the 1999 season. In 2006, he became president of the British Racing Drivers' Club, succeeding Jackie Stewart. Hill stepped down from the position in 2011 and was succeeded by Derek Warwick. He presided over the securing of a 17-year contract for Silverstone to hold Formula One races, which enabled the circuit to see extensive renovation work. Hill later went on to work as part of the Sky Sports F1 broadcasting support team providing expert analysis during free practice sessions.

== Personal and early life ==
Hill was born in Hampstead, London, to Graham and Bette Hill. Graham Hill was a racing driver in the international Formula One series. He won the world Drivers' Championship in 1962 and 1968, and became a well-known personality in the United Kingdom. Graham Hill's career provided a comfortable living. Bette (née Shubrook) was a former rower and medalist at the European Rowing Championships. By 1975, the family lived in a "25-room country mansion" in Hertfordshire and Damon attended the independent The Haberdashers' Aske's Boys' School. The death of his father in an aeroplane crash in 1975 left the 15-year-old Hill, his mother, and sisters Samantha and Brigitte in drastically reduced circumstances. Hill worked as a labourer and a motorcycle courier to support his further education.

Hill is married to Susan "Georgie" George and they have four children, including Joshua. One son was born with Down syndrome and Hill and Georgie are both patrons of the Down's Syndrome Association. In 2009, Hill also became the first patron of St. Joseph's Specialist School and College, a school for children with severe learning disabilities and autism in Cranleigh, Surrey. Joshua started racing in 2008, competing in the British Formula Renault Championship in 2011. Joshua retired from motor racing in 2013.

Hill is the Patron of the charity Disability Africa which runs inclusion projects for disabled children in African countries.

== Career ==
=== Motorcycling ===
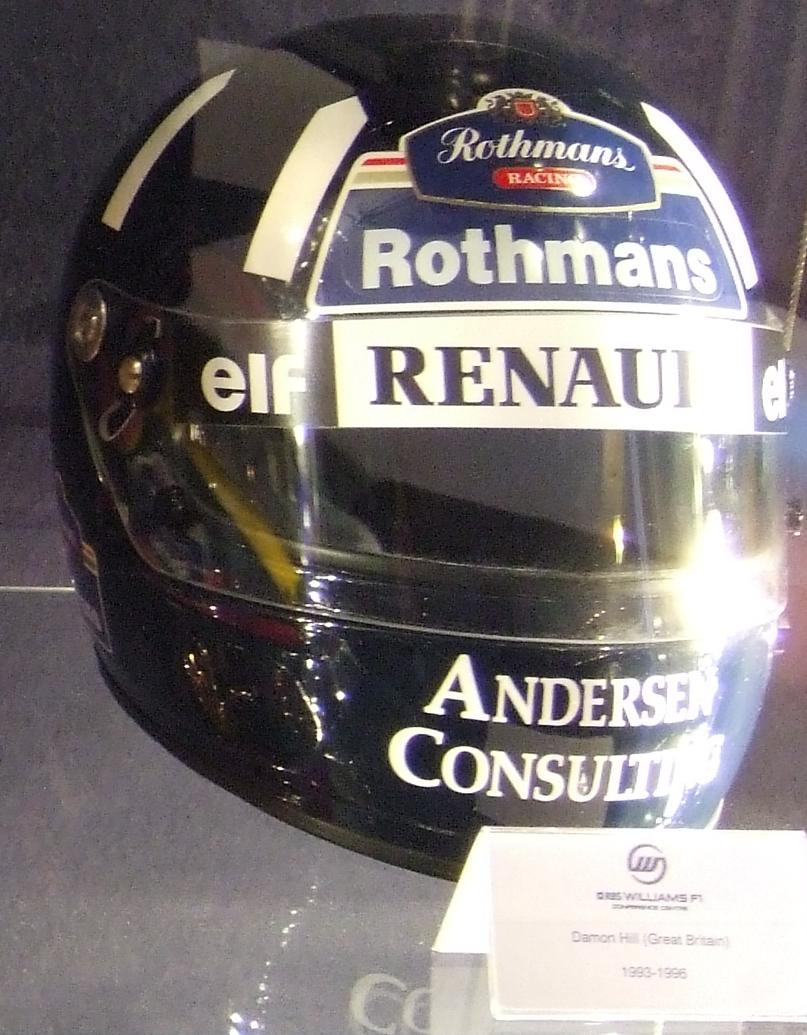
Hill's helmet

Hill started his motorsport career in motorcycle racing in 1981. He used the same simple, easily identifiable helmet design as his father: eight white oar blades arranged vertically around the upper surface of a dark blue helmet. The device and colours represent the London Rowing Club for which Graham Hill rowed in the early 1950s. Although he won a 350 cc clubman's championship at the Brands Hatch circuit, his racing budget came from working as a building labourer. He also worked as a dispatch rider for Apollo Despatch in London, then later Special Delivery, a London motorcycle dispatch company and was provided TZ350 racing bikes by them.

=== Single-seaters ===
His mother, who was concerned about the dangers of racing motorcycles, persuaded him to take a racing car course at the Winfield Racing School in France in 1983. Although he showed "above-average aptitude", Hill had only sporadic single-seater races until the end of 1984. He graduated through British Formula Ford, winning six races driving a Van Diemen for Manadient Racing in 1985, his first full season in cars, and finishing third and fifth in the two UK national championships. He also took third place in the final of the 1985 Formula Ford Festival, helping the UK to win the team prize.

==== British F3 ====
For 1986, Hill planned to move up to the British Formula Three Championship with title-winning team West Surrey Racing. The loss of sponsorship from Ricoh, and then the death of his proposed teammate Bertrand Fabi in a testing accident, ended Hill's proposed drive. Hill says "When Bert was killed, I took the conscious decision that I wasn't going to stop doing that sort of thing. It's not just competing, it's doing something more exciting. I'm at my fullest skiing, racing or whatever. And I'm more frightened of letting it all slip and reaching 60 and finding I've done nothing." Hill borrowed £100,000 to finance his racing thanks to a sponsorship deal with Cellnet, as he explained to the Fuelling Around podcast. The deal involved the sales expertise of David Hunt, brother of F1 driver James Hunt. He had a steady first season for Murray Taylor Racing in 1986 before taking a brace of wins in each of the following years for Intersport. He finished third in the 1988 British F3 championship.

==== Formula 3000 ====
Hill made his F3000 debut with GA Motorsport in the final two rounds of the 1988 International F3000 Season.

In Europe in the 1990s, a successful driver would usually progress from Formula Three either directly to Formula One, the pinnacle of the sport, or to the International Formula 3000 championship. However, for 1989, Hill did not have enough sponsorship available to fund a drive in F3000. He says "I ended up having to reappraise my career a bit. The first thing was to realise how lucky I was to be driving anything. I made the decision that whatever I drove I would do it to the best of my ability and see where it led." He had a couple of outings with Cobra International in the lower level British F3000 championship, securing a podium third place at Oulton Park. Midway through the season, an opportunity arose at the uncompetitive Mooncraft F3000 team. The team tested Hill and Perry McCarthy. Their performances were comparable but according to the team manager, John Wickham, the team sponsors preferred the Hill name. Although his best result was a 14th place, Hill's race performances for Mooncraft led to an offer to drive a Lola chassis for Middlebridge Racing in 1990. He took three pole positions and led five races in 1990, but did not win a race during his Formula 3000 career.

=== Tin-tops ===
==== One-make racing ====
Hill won at Brands Hatch in the Saab series.

==== BTCC and Le Mans ====
In 1989, Hill competed in a one hour Endurance race in the British Touring Car Championship at Donington Park, co-driving the Ford Sierra RS500 usually driven by Sean Walker, the pair finished fourth.

Hill shared a Porsche 962 at Le Mans for Richard Lloyd Racing, where the engine failed after 228 laps.

=== Formula One ===
==== Brabham (1992) ====
Hill started his Grand Prix career during the 1991 season as a test driver with the championship-winning Williams team while still competing in the F3000 series. However, midway through 1992 Hill broke into Grand Prix racing as a driver with the dying Brabham team. The formerly competitive team was in serious financial difficulties. Hill started the season only after three races, replacing Giovanna Amati after her sponsorship had failed to materialise. Amati had been unable to get the car through qualifying but Hill matched his teammate, Eric van de Poele, by qualifying for two races, the mid-season British and Hungarian Grands Prix. Hill continued to test for the Williams team that year and the British Grand Prix saw Nigel Mansell win the race for Williams, while he finished last in the Brabham. The Brabham team collapsed after the Hungarian Grand Prix and did not complete the season.

==== Williams (1993–96) ====
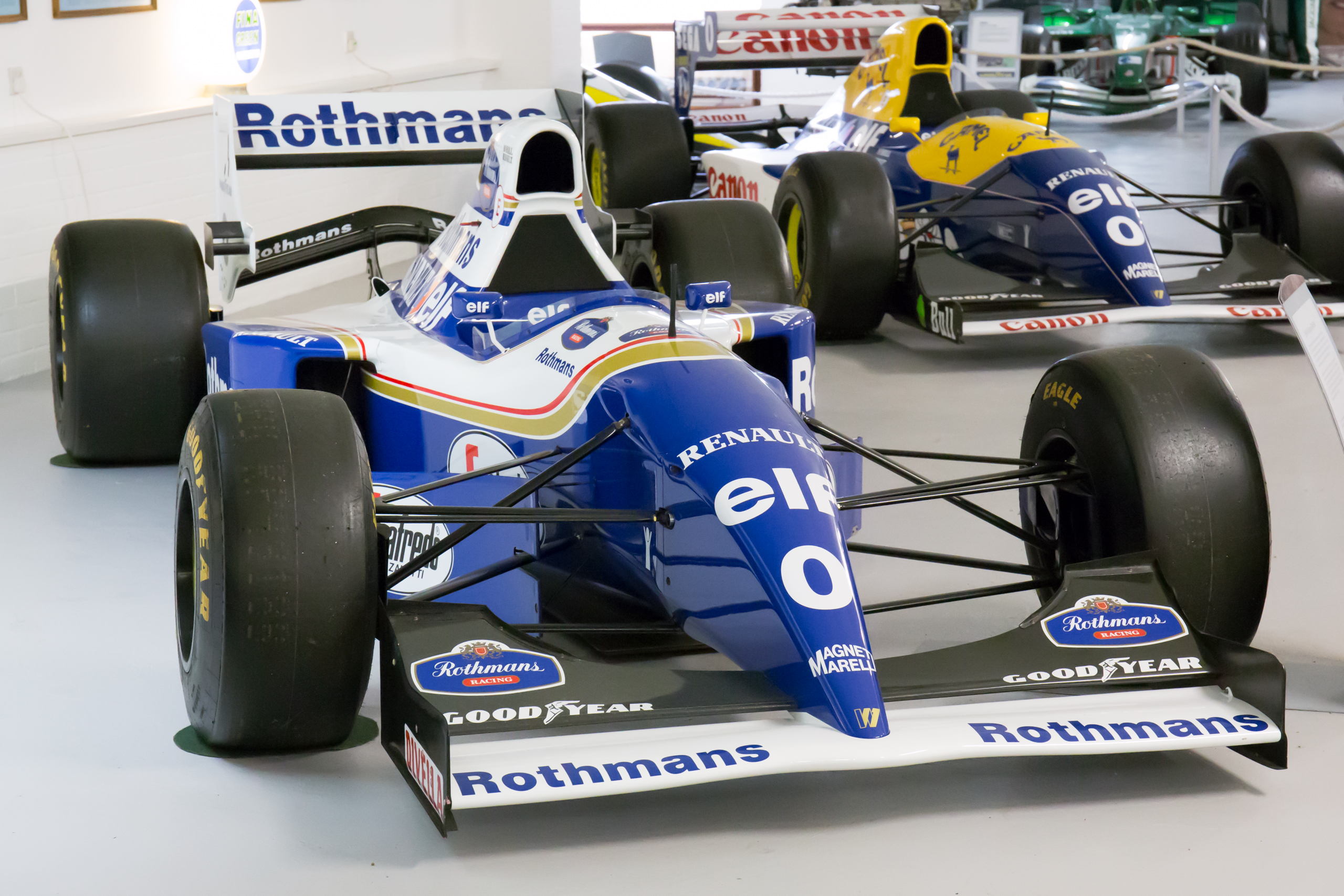
Hill's FW16 (1994) and FW15C (1993); he is one of only two drivers to have carried the number "0" in the history of the F1 World Championship, and the only one to have carried it twice.

When Mansell's teammate Riccardo Patrese left Williams to drive for Benetton in 1993, Hill was unexpectedly promoted to the race team alongside triple World Champion Alain Prost ahead of more experienced candidates such as Martin Brundle and Mika Häkkinen. Traditionally, the reigning driver's World Champion carried the number "1" on his car and his teammate took the number "2". Because Mansell, the 1992 champion, was not racing in Formula One in 1993, Williams as Constructors' Champion were given numbers "0" and "2". As the junior partner to Prost, Hill took "0", the second man in Formula One history to do so, after Jody Scheckter in 1973. In his first full season, Hill benefited from the experience of his veteran French teammate.

1993

The season did not start well when Hill spun out of second place shortly after the start of the South African Grand Prix and failed to finish the race after colliding with Alessandro Zanardi on lap 17. At the Brazilian Grand Prix, Hill qualified and spent the early stages of the race running second behind Prost, and then took the lead when Prost crashed, but was relegated back to second by another three-time World Champion, Ayrton Senna. Nevertheless, the race still gave Hill his first podium finish.

In the next round in Europe, Hill again finished second behind Senna and ahead of a lapped Prost. He continued to impress as the season went on, and in San Marino Hill took the lead at the start, though he was passed by Prost and Senna and ultimately retired with a spin due to a brake failure. Mechanical problems returned in Spain where he kept pace with Prost for most of the race only for his engine to fail.

After strong podiums in Monaco and Canada, Hill took his first career pole in France, finishing second to Prost after team orders prevented him from seriously challenging for the win. He looked set to win the British Grand Prix before another engine failure put him out and led the German Grand Prix comfortably only to suffer a puncture with two laps left, handing the win to Prost.

At the Hungarian race, Hill did take his first career win after leading from start to finish. In doing so he became the first son of a Formula One Grand Prix winner to take victory himself, and he followed it with two more wins, first at Spa where he took the lead following a pit stop problem for Prost, and then at the Italian Grand Prix where Prost's engine failed towards the end. His third consecutive win clinched the Constructors' Championship for Williams and moved him temporarily to second in the Drivers' standings. At the Portuguese Grand Prix Hill came from the back of the grid to third, having stalled on the warm up lap from pole. He finished the season by finishing fourth in Japan and third in Australia, though he lost second in the Drivers' Championship to Ayrton Senna, who passed Hill by winning the last two races.

1994

In 1994, Ayrton Senna joined Hill at Williams. As the reigning champion, this time Prost, was again no longer racing, Hill retained his number '0'. The pre-season betting was that Senna would coast to the title, but the Benetton team and Michael Schumacher initially proved more competitive and won the first three races. At the San Marino Grand Prix on 1 May, Senna died after his car crashed into a concrete barrier while he was leading. With the team undergoing investigation from the Italian authorities on manslaughter charges, Hill found himself team leader with only one season's experience in the top flight. It was widely reported at the time that the Williams car's steering column had failed, though Hill told BBC Sport in 2004 that he believed Senna simply took the corner too fast for the conditions, referring to the fact that the car had just restarted the race with cold tyres after being slowed down by a safety car.

Hill represented Williams alone at the next race, the Monaco Grand Prix. His race ended early in a collision involving several cars on the opening lap of the race. For the following race, the Spanish Grand Prix, Williams's test driver David Coulthard was promoted to the race team alongside Hill, who won the race just four weeks after Senna's death.

Schumacher led by 66 points to 29 by the midpoint of the season. At the French Grand Prix, Frank Williams brought back Nigel Mansell, for the French, European, Japanese and Australian Grands Prix with Coulthard doing the majority of the 1994 season. Mansell earned approximately £900,000 for each of his four races, while Hill was paid £300,000 for the entire season, though Hill's position as lead driver remained unquestioned. Hill came back into contention for the title after winning the British Grand Prix, a race his father had never won. Schumacher was disqualified from that race and banned for two further races for overtaking Hill during the formation lap and ignoring the subsequent black flag. Four more victories for Hill, three of which were in races where Schumacher was excluded or disqualified, took the title battle to the final event at Adelaide. At Schumacher's first race since his ban, the European Grand Prix, he suggested that Hill (who was eight years his senior) was not a world-class driver. However, during the penultimate race at the Japanese Grand Prix, Hill took victory ahead of Schumacher in a rain-soaked event. This put Hill just one point behind the German before the last race of the season. Hill subsequently stated that his driving in Japan was "on a different level from how I'd ever driven before", noting that he never would achieve that level of performance again in his career.

Neither Hill nor Schumacher finished the season-closing Australian Grand Prix, after a controversial collision which gave the title to Schumacher. Schumacher ran off the track hitting the wall with the right-hand side of his Benetton while leading. Coming into the sixth corner Hill moved to pass the Benetton and the two collided, breaking the Williams's front left suspension wishbone, and forcing both drivers' retirement from the race. BBC Formula One commentator Murray Walker, had often maintained that Schumacher did not cause the crash intentionally, but Williams co-owner Patrick Head felt differently. In 2006 he said that at the time of the incident "Williams were already 100% certain that Michael was guilty of foul play" but did not protest Schumacher's title because the team was still dealing with the death of Ayrton Senna. In 2007, Hill explicitly accused Schumacher of causing the collision deliberately.

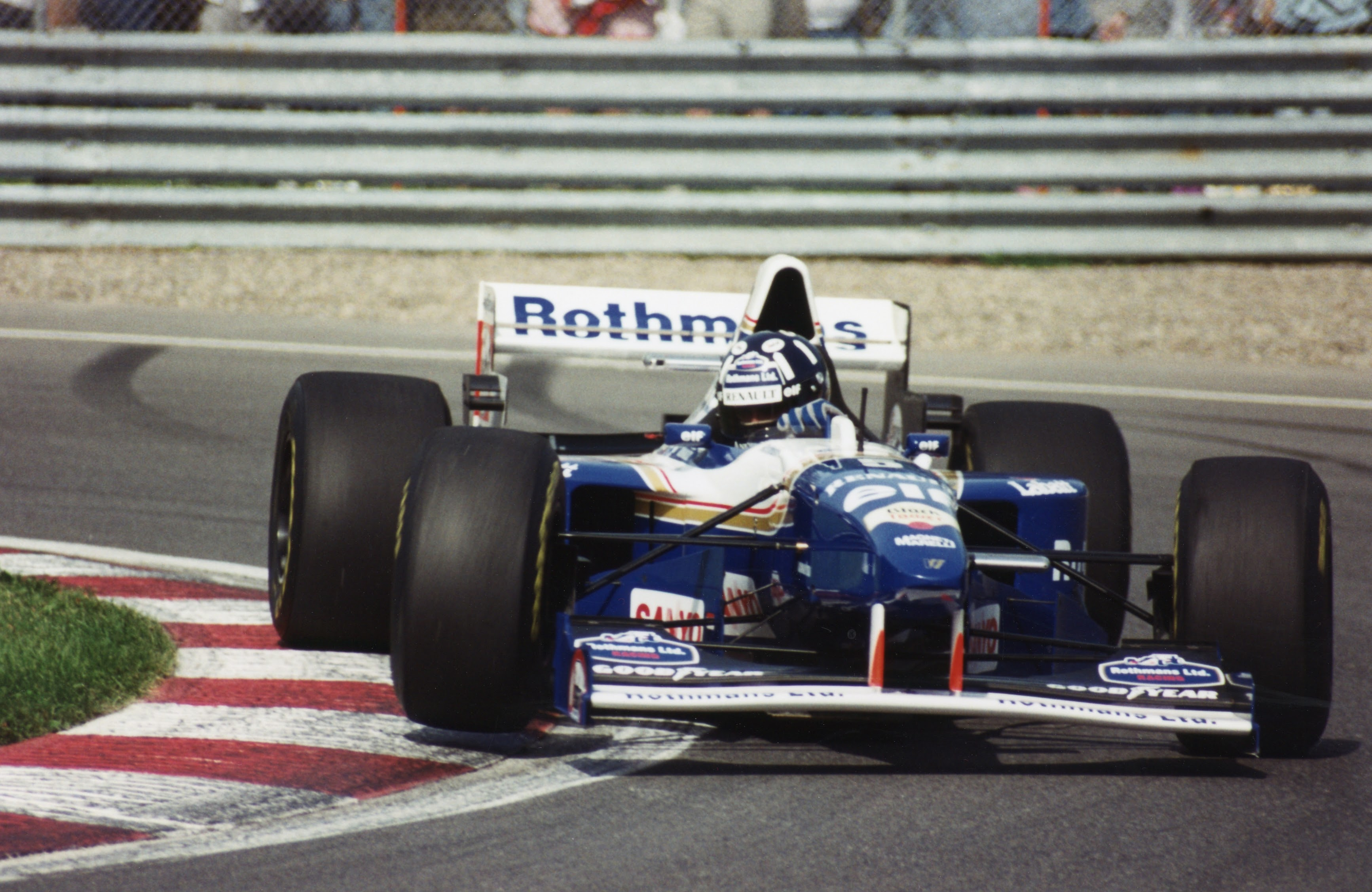
Damon Hill driving for the Williams Formula One team in Montreal in 1995

Hill's season earned him the 1994 BBC Sports Personality of the Year.

1995

Coming into the 1995 season, Hill was one of the title favourites. The Williams team were reigning Constructors' Champions, having beaten Benetton in 1994, and with young David Coulthard, who was embarking on his first full season in Formula One, as teammate, Hill was the clear number one driver. The year seemed to start well with pole position in Brazil, although a spin while in the lead due to a mechanical problem handed the lead to Schumacher. But wins in the next two races put him in the championship lead. However, Schumacher won seven of the next twelve races, and took his second title with two races to spare, while Benetton took the Constructors' Championship. Schumacher and Hill had several on-track incidents during the season, two of which led to suspended one-race bans for both. Schumacher's penalty was for blocking and forcing Hill off the road at the Belgian Grand Prix; Hill's was for colliding with Schumacher under braking at the Italian Grand Prix. Hill's season finished positively when he won the Australian Grand Prix by finishing two laps ahead of the runner-up, Olivier Panis in a Ligier.

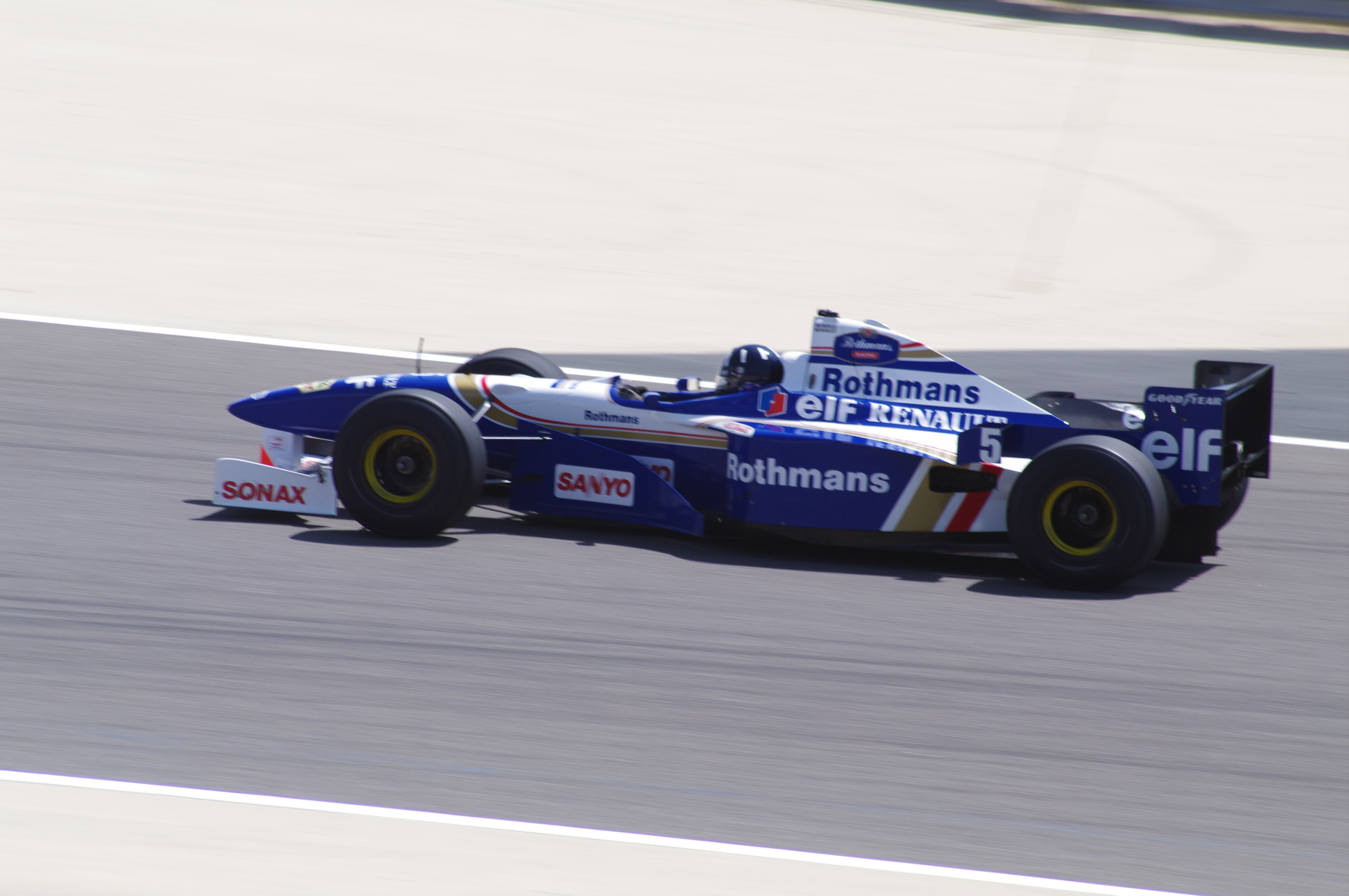
Hill demonstrating his championship-winning Williams FW18 car in 2010

1996

In 1996, the Williams car was clearly the quickest in Formula One and Hill went on to win the title ahead of his teammate, reigning Indycar champion Jacques Villeneuve, becoming the first son of a Formula One champion to win the championship himself. Taking eight wins and never qualifying off the front row, Hill enjoyed by far his most successful season. At Monaco, where his father had won five times in the 1960s, he led until his engine failed, curtailing his race and allowing Olivier Panis to take his only Formula One win. Near the end of the season, Villeneuve began to mount a title challenge and took pole in the Japanese Grand Prix, the final race of the year. However, Hill took the lead at the start and won both the race and the championship while the Canadian retired. Hill equalled the record for starting all 16 races of the season from the front row, matching Ayrton Senna in 1989 and Alain Prost in 1993.

Despite winning the title, Hill learned before the season's close that he was to be dropped by Williams in favour of Heinz-Harald Frentzen for the following season. Hill left Williams as the team's second most successful driver in terms of race victories, with 21, second only to Mansell. Hill's 1996 World Championship earned him his second BBC Sports Personality of the Year Award, making him one of only five people to receive the award twice – the others being boxer Henry Cooper, Nigel Mansell, Andy Murray and Lewis Hamilton. Hill was also awarded the Segrave Trophy by the Royal Automobile Club. The trophy is awarded to the British national who accomplishes the most outstanding demonstration of the possibilities of transport by land, sea, air, or water.

==== Arrows (1997) ====
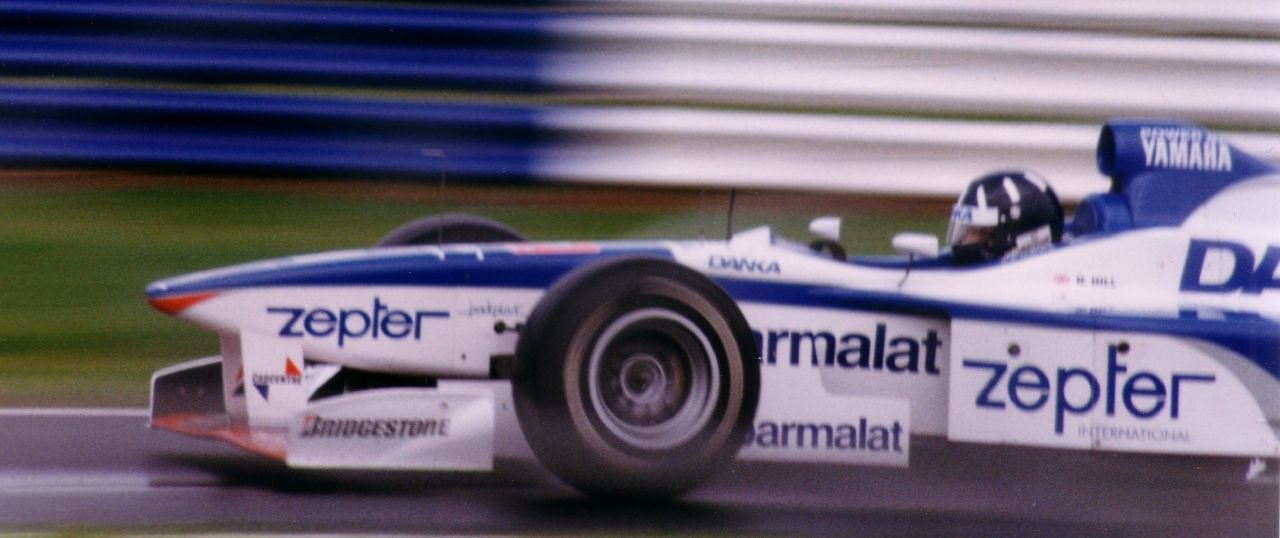
At the British Grand Prix, Hill scored his first point for the Arrows team.

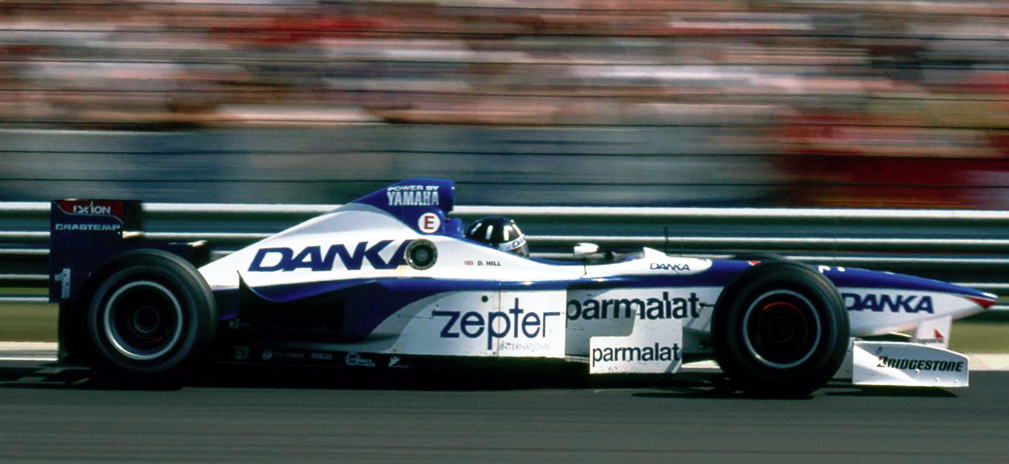
Damon Hill's Arrows A18 leading the Hungarian Grand Prix.

Hill became the fourth driver in nine years to win the World Drivers' Championship for Williams and not drive for the team the following season, as occurred with Nelson Piquet (1987 champion – 1988 driver for Lotus), Nigel Mansell (1992 champion – 1993 driver in the US-based Indy Car World Series instead of F1) and Alain Prost (1993 champion – retired in 1994). As World Champion, Hill was in high demand and had offers for a race seat from McLaren, Benetton and Ferrari but not adequately financially valued despite his status. As a consequence, he opted to sign for Arrows, a team which had never won a race in its 20-year history and had scored only a single point the previous year. Hill's title defence in 1997 proved unsuccessful, getting off to a poor start when he only narrowly qualified for the Australian Grand Prix and then retired on the parade lap. The Arrows car, which used tyres from series debutant Bridgestone and previously unproven Yamaha engines, was generally uncompetitive, and Hill did not score his first point for the team until the British Grand Prix at Silverstone in July. His best result for the year then came at the Hungarian Grand Prix. On a day when the Bridgestone tyres had a competitive edge over their Goodyear rivals, Hill qualified third in a car that had not previously placed higher than ninth on the grid. During the race, he passed his rival and new championship contender, Michael Schumacher, on the track and was leading late in the race, 35 seconds ahead of the eventual 1997 World Champion, Villeneuve, until a hydraulic problem drastically slowed the Arrows. Villeneuve thus passed Hill, who finished second.

==== Jordan (1998–99) ====
Only after one year with Arrows, Hill came close to signing a deal with Alain Prost's team, before deciding to instead sign up with the Jordan team for the 1998 season. His new teammate was Ralf Schumacher, younger brother of Michael. In the first half of the season, the Jordan 198 car was off the pace and unreliable until improvements in performance from the Canadian Grand Prix. During that race, Hill progressed to second place as others retired or made pit stops for fuel. On lap 38, Michael Schumacher, who was delayed by a stop-and-go penalty after forcing Frentzen's Williams off the track, caught Hill on the home straight; Hill moved across the track three times to block Schumacher, who took the place by running over the kerbs at the last chicane. Hill then ran fourth after his only pit stop before retiring due to an electrical failure. After the race, Schumacher accused Hill of dangerous driving. Hill responded by stating that Schumacher "cannot claim anyone drives badly when you look at the things he's been up to in his career. He took Frentzen out completely." At the German Grand Prix, Hill scored his first point of the year. At the Belgian Grand Prix, in very wet conditions, he took the Jordan team's maiden win; Hill was leading late in the race, with teammate Schumacher closing rapidly, when he asked the team whether they would be allowed to race each other. Team principal Eddie Jordan ordered Ralf Schumacher to hold position instead of risking losing a 1–2 finish. The victory was Hill's first since being dropped by the Williams team. Hill finished the season with a last lap pass on Frentzen at the Japanese Grand Prix, which earned him fourth place in the race and Jordan fourth position in that year's Constructors' Championship.

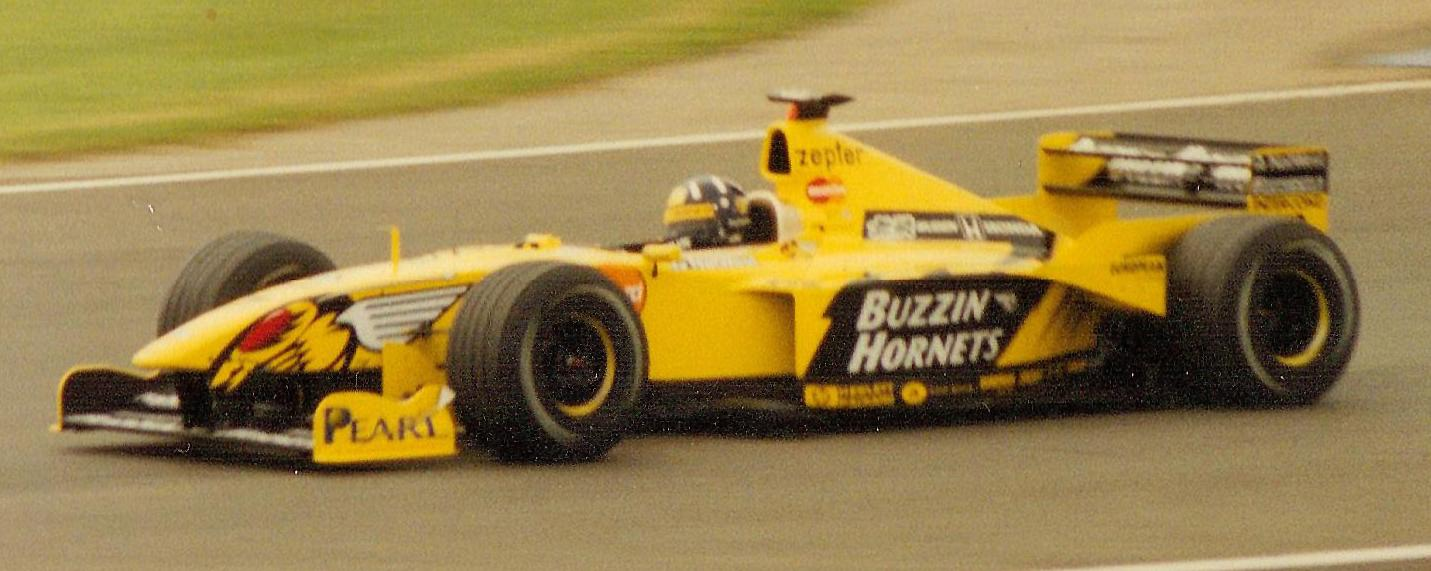
Hill driving for Jordan at the 1999 British Grand Prix

Hopes were high for 1999, but Hill did not enjoy a good season. Struggling with the newly introduced four-grooved tyres, he was outpaced by his new teammate, Heinz-Harald Frentzen, who was Hill's replacement at Williams two years prior. After a crash at the Canadian Grand Prix, Hill announced plans to retire from the sport at the end of the year, but after failing to finish the French Grand Prix that Frentzen won, he considered quitting the sport immediately.

Jordan persuaded Hill to at least stay for the British Grand Prix. Going into that race weekend, Hill announced he would retire after the Grand Prix, leading Jordan to test Jos Verstappen in case Hill had to be quickly replaced. Following a strong fifth place at his home event, however, Hill changed his mind and decided to see out the year. His best result for the remainder of the season was sixth place, which he achieved in both Hungary and Belgium. With three races of 1999 to go, there were rumours that the Prost Grand Prix team would release Jarno Trulli early after he signed for Jordan's 2000 campaign as Hill's replacement. At the same time, his teammate, Frentzen, became a title contender going into the final few races of the season and, eventually, finished third in the championship. In so doing, both Hill and Frentzen helped Jordan to achieve its best-ever finish with a third position in the Constructors' Championship. Hill's last race was the Japanese Grand Prix where he spun off the track and pulled into the pit lane citing mental fatigue.

== After racing ==
In retirement, Hill has continued to be involved with cars and motorsport. He founded the Prestige and Super Car Private Members Club P1 International with Michael Breen in 2000; Breen bought Hill out in October 2006. Hill also became involved in a BMW dealership, just outside Royal Leamington Spa, that bore his name and an Audi dealership in Exeter. Although his salary as a driver was low for all of his teams other than Arrows, he has amassed a fortune estimated at $30 million USD.

In April 2006, Hill succeeded Jackie Stewart as President of the British Racing Drivers' Club (BRDC). He presided over the securing of a 17-year contract for Silverstone to hold Formula One races, which enabled the circuit to see extensive renovation work. Hill was also the manager of racing driver Steven Kane.

In 2009, Hill received an Honorary Fellowship from the University of Northampton recognising his successful career and his connection with Northampton through Silverstone and the BRDC.

Hill also made a UK television advert with F1 commentator Murray Walker for Pizza Hut, in which Walker commentated on Hill's meal as if it were a race. Hill has also appeared on many British television programmes, including Top Gear, This is Your Life, TFI Friday, Shooting Stars and Bang Bang, It's Reeves and Mortimer.

In 2019, Hill supported a team in the Brands Hatch Indy KA 500 round of the inaugural EnduroKA Season, that included Eric Boullier as one of the drivers. In February 2026, he rejoined Williams as an official ambassador.

=== Other racing ===
Hill has raced both cars and motorcycles at the Goodwood Festival of Speed. In 2005, Hill tested the new GP2 Series car. He drove the 600 bhp (450 kW) Grand Prix Masters single seater racing vehicle for a test run around the Silverstone Circuit in mid-2006. He had discussions to join the series limited to retired Formula One drivers who were aged 45 or over but these talks did not materialise in a drive. In June 2006, Hill tested Bernd Schneider's Mercedes DTM car at Brands Hatch.

Hill served as the driver representative on the stewards' panel at the 2010 Monaco Grand Prix which decided to penalise Hill's former rival Michael Schumacher for overtaking under yellow flag conditions. The decision led to Hill receiving hate mail.

Between 18 and 19 May 2012, Hill, along with former British F3 Mark Blundell, Perry McCarthy, Martin Donnelly and Julian Bailey (collectively nicknamed "The Rat Pack" back in the day) participated in the first round of the VW Scirocco R-Cup at Brands Hatch to raise funds for the Halow Charity. Hill completed seven laps of the circuit before retiring. On 7 October 2012, Hill drove his father's BRM in celebration of the 50th anniversary of having won the 1962 F1 World Championship. In June 2018, Hill became the President of the Brooklands Trust Members who are the support group for Brooklands Museum.

Hill published his autobiography, Watching the Wheels, in 2016, in which he revealed he had suffered with depression.

=== Broadcaster ===
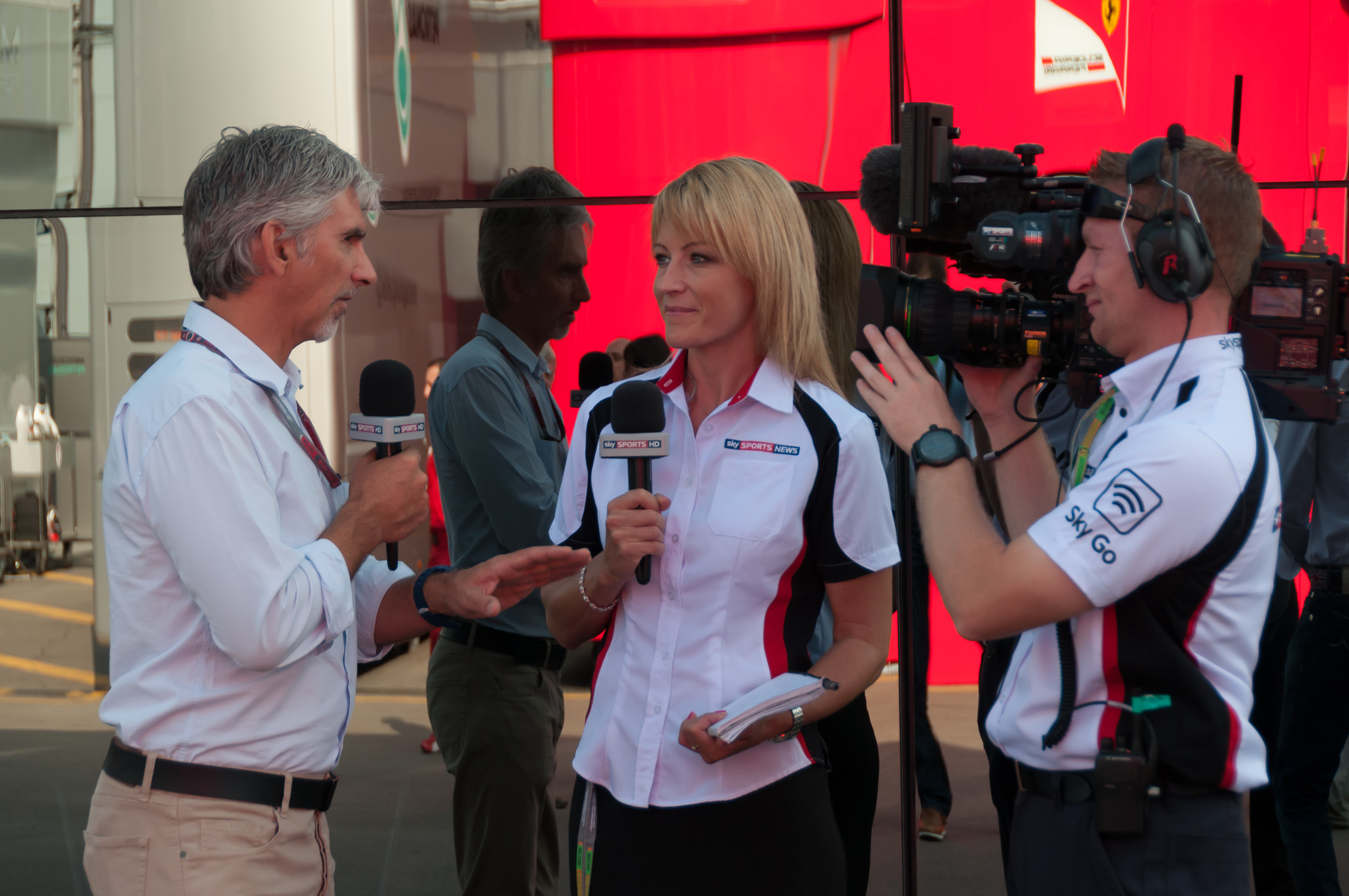
Hill (left) working as a presenter for Sky Sports F1

Hill has frequently appeared in the British media. In June 1975, he appeared alongside his father on the television programme Jim'll Fix It. He again appeared on the programme in January 1995, marking the twentieth anniversary of the show. He has contributed many articles to F1 Racing magazine and has twice appeared in ITV F1's commentary box, covering for Martin Brundle at the Hungarian Grand Prix in 2007 and 2008. British Sky Broadcasting signed Hill to join their Formula One presentation team on Sky Sports F1 as a pundit starting from the 2012 Formula One World Championship. Hill resigned after the 2024 São Paulo Grand Prix, having worked as an analyst across 13 seasons. In March 2025, it was announced that Hill would be a pundit for BBC's radio coverage of the 2025 Formula One season.

=== Music career ===
Hill was interested in music from an early age and formed the punk band the "Hormones" with some friends while at school. After achieving success in Formula One, he was able to play guitar with several famous musicians, including his friend George Harrison, and appeared on "Demolition Man", the opening track of Def Leppard's 1999 album Euphoria. "I'm quite proud of that one to be honest", Hill told the Fuelling Around podcast. "You can actually hear my guitar as they fade it out towards the end of the song. I think it fits well with the track and it went platinum!"

Hill also made a regular appearance at the British Grand Prix alongside other Formula One musicians such as Eddie Jordan. After his retirement at the end of the 1999 season, Hill devoted more time to music and played with Pat Cash's Wild Colonial Boys. Hill also formed his own band, The Conrods, which was active between 1999 and 2003 and played cover versions of well-known songs from The Rolling Stones, The Beatles and The Kinks. Since becoming president of the BRDC in 2006, Hill says he has stopped playing the guitar, being "too busy doing school runs and looking after pets."

== Racing record ==
=== Career summary ===
Season	Series	Team	Races	Wins	Poles	F/Laps	Podiums	Points	Position
1985	Formula Ford Festival		1	0	0	?	1	N/A	**3rd**
1986	British Formula Three	Murray Taylor Racing	18	0	0	0	1	15	9th
1986	Macau Grand Prix	Flying Tigers Murray Taylor Racing	1	0	0	0	0	N/A	DNF
1987	British Formula Three	Intersport Racing	18	2	2	2	6	49	5th
1987	Macau Grand Prix	Intersport Engineering w/ Flying Tigers	1	0	0	0	0	N/A	20th
1988	British Formula Three	Cellnet Ricoh Racing/Intersport Team	18	2	2	1	8	57	**3rd**
1988	Formula 3000	GA Motorsport	2	0	0	0	0	0	NC
1988	Macau Grand Prix	Intersport Engineering w/ Flying Tigers	1	0	0	0	1	N/A	**2nd**
1989	Formula 3000	Footwork Formula	5	0	0	0	0	0	NC
1989	British Formula Three	Intersport Racing	4	0	0	0	0	0	NC
1989	British Touring Car Championship	FAI Auto Parts	1	0	0	0	0	3	18th
1989	24 Hours of Le Mans	Richard Lloyd Racing	1	0	0	0	0	0	DNF
1990	Formula 3000	Middlebridge Racing	10	0	3	2	1	6	13th
1991	Formula 3000	Barclay Team EJR	10	0	0	0	1	11	7th
1991	Formula One	Canon Williams Renault	Test driver						
1992	Formula One	Brabham	2	0	0	0	0	0	NC
1992	Formula One	Canon Williams Renault	Reserve driver						
1993	Formula One	Canon Williams Renault	16	3	2	4	10	69	**3rd**
1994	Formula One	Rothmans Williams Renault	16	6	2	6	11	91	**2nd**
1995	Formula One	Rothmans Williams Renault	17	4	7	4	9	69	**2nd**
1996	Formula One	Rothmans Williams Renault	16	8	9	5	10	97	**1st**
1997	Formula One	Danka Arrows Yamaha	17	0	0	0	1	7	12th
1998	Formula One	Benson & Hedges Jordan	16	1	0	0	1	20	6th
1999	Formula One	Benson & Hedges Jordan	16	0	0	0	0	7	12th

=== Complete British Formula Three Championship results ===
(key) (Races in bold indicate pole position) (Races in italics indicate fastest lap)

Year	Entrant	Engine	1	2	3	4	5	6	7	8	9	10	11	12	13	14	15	16	17	18	19	DC	Pts
1986	Murray Taylor Racing	VW	THR; 13	SIL; 10	THR; Ret	SIL; Ret	BRH; 13	THR; 8	DON; 5	SIL; 6	SIL; 9	OUL; 4	ZAN; 5	DON; Ret	SNE; 2	SIL; Ret	BRH; 6	SPA; Ret	ZOL; Ret	SIL; Ret		9th	15
1987	Intersport Team	Toyota	SIL; C	THR; Ret	**BRH**; 3	SIL; Ret	THR; Ret	SIL; 5	BRH; 7	THR; 5	SIL; 4	ZAN; 1	DON; Ret	SIL; 5	SNE; 13	**DON**; Ret	OUL; 3	SIL; 2	BRH; 2	SPA; 1	**THR**; Ret	5th	49
1988	Cellnet Ricoh Racing/Intersport Team	Toyota	THR; 3	SIL; 6	THR; Ret	BRH; 2	DON; 4	SIL; 3	**BRH**; Ret	**THR**; 1	SIL; Ret	DON; 4	SIL; 1	SNE; Ret	OUL; 3	SIL; 24	BRH; 2	SPA; 4	THR; 3	SIL; 10		3rd	57

=== Complete International Formula 3000 results ===
(key) (Races in bold indicate pole position; races in italics indicate fastest lap.)

Year	Entrant	Chassis	Engine	1	2	3	4	5	6	7	8	9	10	11	Pos.	Pts
1988	GA Motorsport	Lola T88/50	Cosworth	JER	VAL	PAU	SIL	MNZ	PER	BRH	BIR	BUG	ZOL; Ret	DIJ; 8	NC	0
1989	Footwork Formula	Footwork MC041	Mugen	SIL	VAL	PAU	JER	PER; Ret	BRH; Ret	BIR; DNS	SPA; 14	BUG; 16	DIJ; 15		NC	0
1990	Middlebridge Racing	Lola T90/50	Cosworth	DON; DNQ	SIL; Ret	PAU; Ret	JER; 7	**MNZ**; 11	**PER**; Ret	**HOC**; Ret	BRH; 2	BIR; Ret	BUG; Ret	NOG; 10	13th	6
1991	Barclay Team EJR	Lola T91/50	Cosworth	VAL; 4	PAU; Ret	JER; 8	MUG; Ret	PER; 11	HOC; Ret	BRH; 6	SPA; Ret	BUG; 4			7th	11
1991	Barclay Team EJR	Reynard 91D	Cosworth										NOG; 3		7th	11

=== Complete British Touring Car Championship results ===
(key) (Races in bold indicate pole position; races in italics indicate fastest lap.)

Year	Team	Car	Class	1	2	3	4	5	6	7	8	9	10	11	12	13	Pos.	Pts	Class
1989	FAI Auto Parts	Ford Sierra RS500	A	OUL	SIL	THR	DON ovr:4‡ cls:4‡	THR	SIL	SIL	BRH	SNE	BRH	BIR	DON	SIL	47th	3	18th

‡ Endurance driver

=== Complete British Formula 3000 results ===
(key) (Races in bold indicate pole position; races in italics indicate fastest lap)

Year	Entrant	1	2	3	4	5	6	7	8	9	DC	Pts
1989	CoBRa Motorsports	BRH	THR	OUL; 3	DON	BRH; 6	SNE	SIL	OUL	BRH	11th	5

=== 24 Hours of Le Mans results ===
Year	Team	Co-Drivers	Car	Class	Laps	Pos.	Class Pos.
1989	(United Kingdom) Richard Lloyd Racing	(Sweden) Steven Andskär (United Kingdom) David Hobbs	Porsche 962C GTi	C1	228	DNF	DNF

=== Complete Formula One results ===
(key) (Races in bold indicate pole position) (Races in italics indicate fastest lap)

Year	Entrant	Chassis	Engine	1	2	3	4	5	6	7	8	9	10	11	12	13	14	15	16	17	WDC	Pts
1992	Brabham	Brabham BT60B	Judd GV 3.5 V10	RSA	MEX	BRA	ESP; DNQ	SMR; DNQ	MON; DNQ	CAN; DNQ	FRA; DNQ	GBR; 16	GER; DNQ	HUN; 11	BEL; DNA	ITA	POR	JPN	AUS		NC	0
1993	Canon Williams Renault	Williams FW15C	Renault RS5 3.5 V10	RSA; Ret	BRA; 2	EUR; 2	SMR; Ret	ESP; Ret	MON; 2	CAN; 3	**FRA**; 2	GBR; Ret	GER; 15^{†}	HUN; 1	BEL; 1	ITA; 1	**POR**; 3	JPN; 4	AUS; 3		**3rd**	**69**
1994	Rothmans Williams Renault	Williams FW16	Renault RS6 3.5 V10	BRA; 2	PAC; Ret	SMR; 6	MON; Ret	ESP; 1	CAN; 2	**FRA**; 2	**GBR**; 1										**2nd**	**91**
1994	Rothmans Williams Renault	Williams FW16B	Renault RS6 3.5 V10									GER; 8	HUN; 2	BEL; 1	ITA; 1	POR; 1	EUR; 2	JPN; 1	AUS; Ret		**2nd**	**91**
1995	Rothmans Williams Renault	Williams FW17	Renault RS7 3.0 V10	**BRA**; Ret	ARG; 1	SMR; 1	ESP; 4	**MON**; 2	CAN; Ret	**FRA**; 2	**GBR**; Ret	**GER**; Ret	**HUN**; 1	BEL; 2	ITA; Ret	POR; 3					**2nd**	**69**
1995	Rothmans Williams Renault	Williams FW17B	Renault RS7 3.0 V10														EUR; Ret	PAC; 3	JPN; Ret	**AUS**; 1	**2nd**	**69**
1996	Rothmans Williams Renault	Williams FW18	Renault RS8 3.0 V10	AUS; 1	**BRA**; 1	**ARG**; 1	**EUR**; 4	SMR; 1	MON; Ret	**ESP**; Ret	**CAN**; 1	FRA; 1	**GBR**; Ret	**GER**; 1	HUN; 2	BEL; 5	**ITA**; Ret	**POR**; 2	JPN; 1		**1st**	**97**
1997	Danka Zepter Arrows Yamaha	Arrows A18	Yamaha OX11C/D 3.0 V10	AUS; DNS	BRA; 17^{†}	ARG; Ret	SMR; Ret	MON; Ret	ESP; Ret	CAN; 9	FRA; 12	GBR; 6	GER; 8	HUN; 2	BEL; 13^{†}	ITA; Ret	AUT; 7	LUX; 8	JPN; 11	EUR; Ret	12th	7
1998	Benson & Hedges Jordan	Jordan 198	Mugen-Honda MF-301 HC 3.0 V10	AUS; 8	BRA; DSQ	ARG; 8	SMR; 10^{†}	ESP; Ret	MON; 8	CAN; Ret	FRA; Ret	GBR; Ret	AUT; 7	GER; 4	HUN; 4	BEL; 1	ITA; 6	LUX; 9	JPN; 4		6th	20
1999	Benson & Hedges Jordan	Jordan 199	Mugen-Honda MF-301 HD 3.0 V10	AUS; Ret	BRA; Ret	SMR; 4	MON; Ret	ESP; 7	CAN; Ret	FRA; Ret	GBR; 5	AUT; 8	GER; Ret	HUN; 6	BEL; 6	ITA; 10	EUR; Ret	MAL; Ret	JPN; Ret		12th	7

^{†} Did not finish, but was classified as he had completed more than 90% of the race distance.

== See also ==
- Hill–Schumacher rivalry

Sporting positions
Preceded by Michael Schumacher	Formula One World Champion; 1996	Succeeded by Jacques Villeneuve
Preceded by Jackie Stewart	BRDC President; 2006–2011	Succeeded by Derek Warwick
Awards and achievements
Preceded by Nigel Mansell	Hawthorn Memorial Trophy; 1993–1996	Succeeded by Jacques Villeneuve
Preceded by Linford Christie	BBC Sports Personality of the Year; 1994	Succeeded by Jonathan Edwards
Preceded by Jonathan Edwards	BBC Sports Personality of the Year; 1996	Succeeded by Greg Rusedski
Preceded by Derek Warwick	Autosport; British Competition Driver; 1993	Succeeded by David Coulthard
Preceded by Nigel Mansell	Autosport; International Racing Driver Award; 1994	Succeeded by Michael Schumacher
Preceded by David Coulthard	Autosport; British Competition Driver; 1995–1996	Succeeded by Mark Blundell
Preceded by Michael Schumacher	Autosport; International Racing Driver Award; 1996	Succeeded by Jacques Villeneuve
