= Williams FW16 =

Formula One racing car

Williams FW16 Williams FW16B Williams FW16C
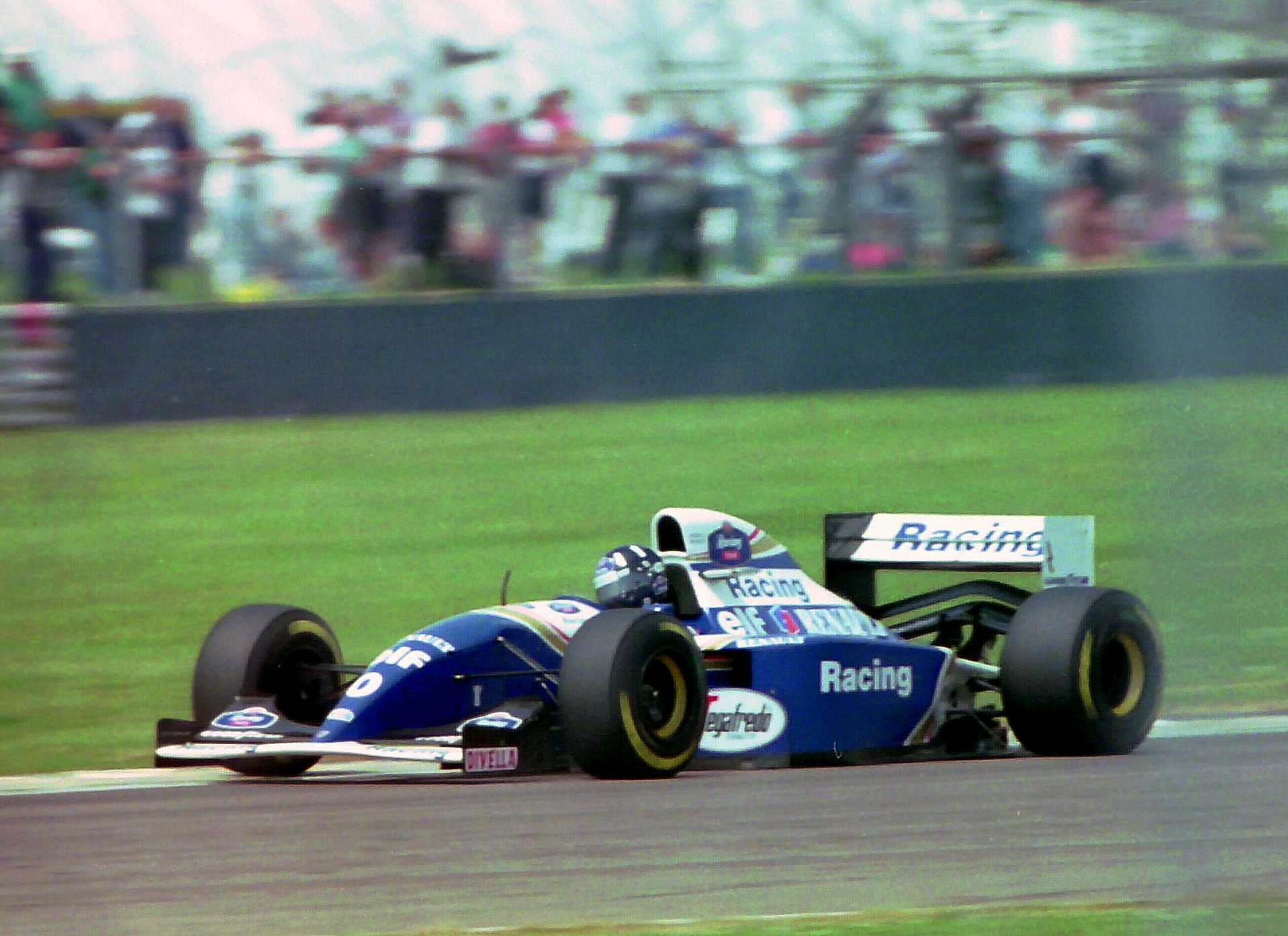
- Damon Hill driving the FW16B at the 1994 British Grand Prix
- Category: Formula One
- Constructor: Williams (chassis, transmission, electronics); Renault Sport (engine)
- Designers: Patrick Head (Technical Director); Adrian Newey (Chief Designer); Eghbal Hamidy (Chief Aerodynamicist); Bernard Dudot (Chief Engine Designer (Renault Sport))
- Predecessor: FW15C
- Successor: FW17

Technical specifications
- Chassis: Carbon fibre and Aramid monocoque
- Suspension (front): Williams inboard torsion spring, double wishbone, operated by a push-rod bellcrank
- Suspension (rear): Williams inboard coil-spring, double wishbone, operated by a push-rod bellcrank
- Axle track: Front: 1,670 mm (66 in); Rear: 1,590 mm (63 in)
- Wheelbase: 2,920 mm (115 in)
- Engine: Renault RS6 / RS6B / RS6C, 3,498 cc (213.5 cu in), 67° V10, NA, mid-engine, longitudinally mounted
- Transmission: Williams transverse 6-speed sequential semi-automatic
- Power: 790–830 hp (589.1–618.9 kW) @ 14,300 rpm 340 lb⋅ft (461.0 N⋅m) of torque
- Fuel: Elf
- Tyres: Goodyear

Competition history
- Notable entrants: Rothmans Williams Renault
- Notable drivers: 0. (United Kingdom) Damon Hill; 2. (Brazil) Ayrton Senna; 2. (United Kingdom) Nigel Mansell; 2. (United Kingdom) David Coulthard
- Debut: 1994 Brazilian Grand Prix
- First win: 1994 Spanish Grand Prix
- Last win: 1994 Australian Grand Prix
- Last event: 1994 Australian Grand Prix
Races	Wins	Podiums	Poles	F/Laps
16	7	13	6	8
- Constructors' Championships: 1 (1994)
- Drivers' Championships: 0

The Williams FW16 is a Formula One car designed by Adrian Newey for the British Williams team. The FW16 competed in the 1994 Formula One season, with Williams winning the Constructor's Championship, and British driver Damon Hill finishing runner-up in the Drivers' Championship. It is notable as the last car to be driven by three-time world champion Ayrton Senna before his fatal accident during the San Marino Grand Prix. The car was designed around the major regulation changes that the FIA had introduced in the off-season, banning the various electronic devices that had been used by the front running cars during the preceding two seasons.

The FW16 was a passive evolution of the FW15C that had preceded it. It featured revised bodywork, including a low profile engine cover; taller sidepods; enclosed driveshaft; and an anhedral rear wing lower element, which was previously hinted at on the FW15C. In addition to these changes, the FW16 featured an innovative rear suspension wishbone design, an improved version of the Renault Sport Formula One engine (RS6), and a fuel valve to enable the ability for mid-race refuelling (a rule reintroduced for 1994).

As with the previous season, the number 0 car was driven by Damon Hill for the entire year. Only the defending champion had the right to use number 1 and reigning champion Alain Prost had left the sport. The number 2 car was driven by Ayrton Senna. Williams test driver David Coulthard filled in for most of the season but Williams also brought back Nigel Mansell, who had won the drivers' title for them in 1992, when his Indycar commitments allowed. Although it was fast, the car proved to be a tricky proposition in early testing and in the early part of the season. The car had a number of problems that were not properly remedied: it was aerodynamically unstable, and a design flaw was discovered in the car's frontal section and there were attempts to correct this in time for the ill-fated third race, at the San Marino Grand Prix.

Various other alterations were made by Newey and Patrick Head to alleviate the car's handling problems, such as the addition of bargeboards at the Spanish Grand Prix; the FIA-mandated modifications to the airbox at the Canadian Grand Prix; and shorter sidepods at the German Grand Prix. This heavily revised B-spec car was labelled the FW16B from the German race onwards and was much improved from the original car. It was developed by Hill, but the Benetton B194 and Michael Schumacher were dominant in the first half of the season.

== Chassis ==
The car configuration included a distinctive anhedral rear wing lower element, the effectiveness of which depended on a low outboard tail section, which was achieved by totally enclosing the driveshafts within wing-section carbon-fibre composite shrouds that doubled as the upper wishbones. This shroud was removable in case it was deemed to be outside the imposed regulations.

=== Engine ===
The car was powered by a 67-degree V10 engine by Renault Sport termed the RS6 specification, delivering approximately 830 hp. Its power was transmitted by means of a revised and lightened version of the six-speed transverse sequential gearbox used the previous year.

=== Electronics ===
The FW16 featured power-assisted steering, hydraulically driven, and reacting to input from electronic sensors, a system that drew heavily from the knowledge gained from the team's active suspension technology. It lacked the fully-automatic gear change system of the preceding year and was restricted to a semi-automatic transmission. In accordance with the new 1994 regulations, the FW16 did not have adjustable anti-roll bar controls accessible by the driver from the cockpit, which were present in FW15C and earlier Williams F1 cars.

=== Imola modifications ===
The early season performance of the FW16 indicated that it had shortcomings. The window of setup in which the car was competitive was very narrow, with many external factors which would otherwise be unrelated to the mechanics of the car (weather, track conditions, etc.), having unusually large influences on the overall performance. The early problems led to a raft of aerodynamic changes in the first half of the season, the first coming for the ill-fated San Marino GP at Imola. The front wing was a significant area of development. "The problem is that the front wing is too sensitive to the ride height," said Patrick Head in 1994. "If you were in a corner and went over a bump, the car could pick up a lot more front downforce than the rear. So if you were balanced at that point, with the car neutral, you'd lose the rear very quickly."

The first comprehensive set of modifications to widen this driveability window was introduced at Imola. These included a revised nose profile with the wings positioned slightly higher, new aerodynamic end plates which were slightly taller, a revised wheelbase and a re-shaped cockpit surround. Other cockpit changes were designed to accommodate Senna's desire to be made more comfortable in the car and included changes to the steering column design to adjust the steering wheel position in line with Senna's personal preference. This included welding an additional extension onto the steering column.

=== Criticisms ===
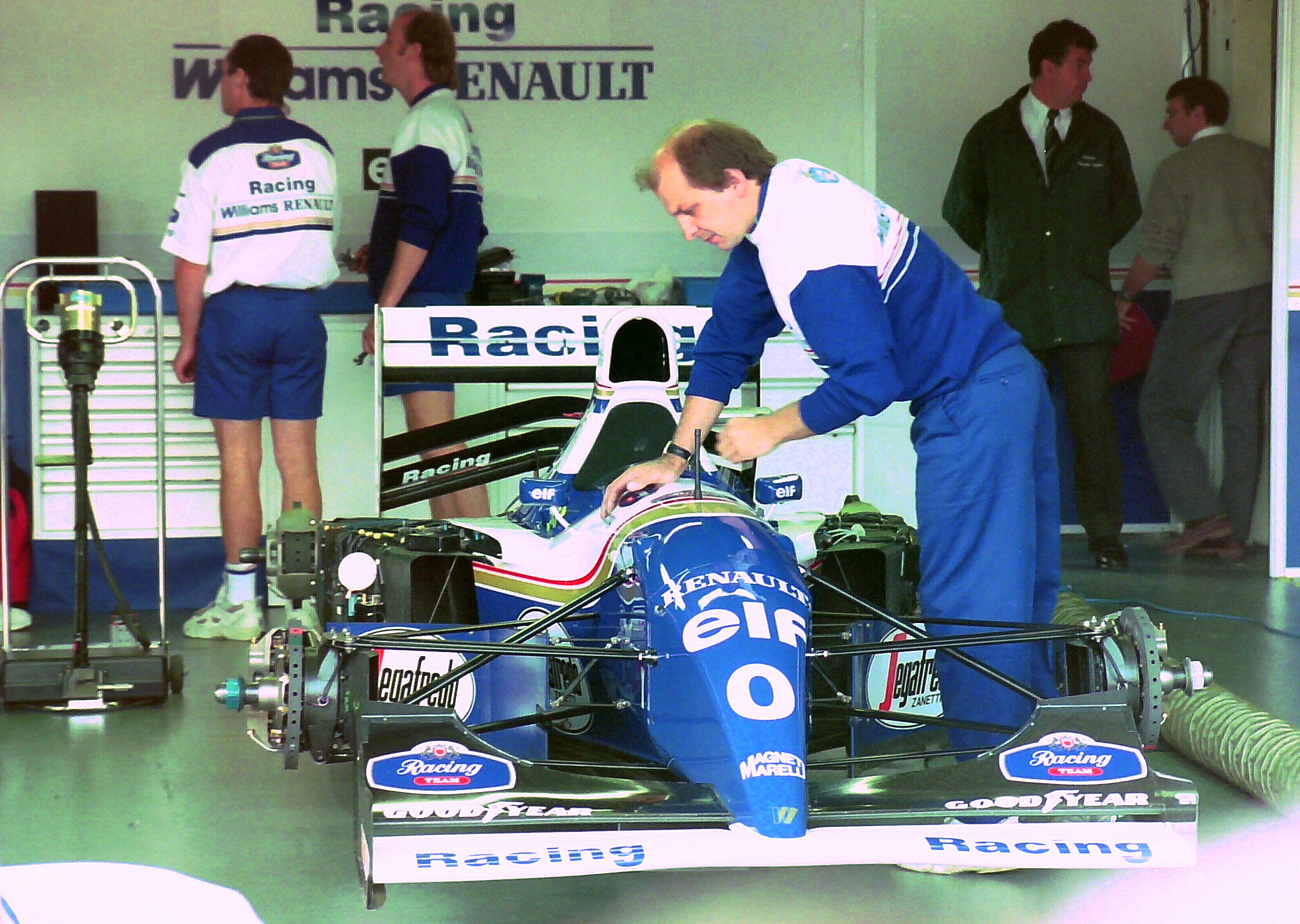
FW16 of Damon Hill in the pit garage at the 1994 British Grand Prix

The car was shown to have severe shortcomings at its debut. The FW16 lacked the active suspension and traction control of the previous season's FW15C, yet was an evolution of a chassis that had been designed for and depended on these systems. It suffered from a very narrow driveability setup window that made it difficult to drive until the modifications to become the FW16B. This could be seen when Senna, pushing to close the gap between himself and Schumacher, spun out of second place during the Brazilian Grand Prix, and by the identical spins in practice by Hill and Senna at Aida, with Senna commenting on the Aida practice spin: "I can't explain it. I was actually in one of my best positions at that corner when it went. It looked silly and stupid but better it happens today than tomorrow."

The narrow driveability window stemmed from the fact that the car's aerodynamics were an evolution of a platform designed around the active suspension. The aerodynamics were therefore designed to work with active suspension and did not have the latitude required in a passive car. Newey said, "The 1994 car was not a good car at all at the start of the year. It was very difficult to drive. We developed the aerodynamics using active suspension and we developed them [to work] in a very small window. Having had active suspension for two years, when we then lost it we had more trouble re-adapting to passive suspension than other people who hadn't been on it for very long".

"We've had a few problems", said Newey after the Pacific Grand Prix. "Mainly, it is a grip problem in the slow corners. In medium- and high-speed ones, it is pretty good." Paddy Lowe, who had left Williams for McLaren in 1994, said in 2014, "Aerodynamic experimentation in those days was not sophisticated enough to understand the ride height sensitivity of aero. In the wind tunnel now we run ride height sweeps, steer sweeps, roll sweeps, and yaw sweeps, plus a load more. Back then, if a typical model was running different front and rear ride heights in a straight line, you were at the leading edge of sophistication."

"That would mean the impact of introducing a much wider range of ride heights on circuit [through not having active suspension] would be greater than people were perhaps able to deal with. I'm making this up really to fit what we observed. Certainly, Ayrton really struggled with the Williams in the early season, and some of his complaints would fit that theory."

Senna commented on the FW16 during early season testing, saying "I am uncomfortable in the car, it all feels wrong. We changed the seat and the wheel, but even so, I was already asking for more room. ... Going back to when we raced at Estoril last September (on testing the passive Williams at the same track 4 months later), it feels much more difficult. Some of that is down to the lack of electronic change. Also, the car has its own characteristics which I'm not fully confident in yet. It makes you a lot more tense and that stresses you."

Patrick Head subsequently removed a section of the chassis to give Senna more space. However, the new passive Williams FW16 had its shortcomings. The car was springy and unstable, with aerodynamic deficiencies which the revolutionary rear suspension could not mask.

Even after the initial Imola modifications, the car maintained its tendency of dynamically changing its handling balance (understeer or oversteer) for any given setup. A short account of a driver briefing which Ayrton Senna gave to Adrian Newey and his race engineer in 1994, David Brown, at Imola describing this characteristic was shown in the 2010 film Senna. In this exchange, Senna describes the car as being "worse" than before.

It is also alleged that in a conversation about the FW16 between Prost and Senna in early 1994, Prost had said that the FW15C had not consistently been as easy to drive as others had assumed in 1993, exhibiting odd behaviour at times. Being more nervous than the preceding FW14B when driven at the limit this manifested itself in slight rear-end instability under braking, most notable on high-speed circuits when the car was operating in a low downforce trim, attributed to small changes in weight distribution from the year before. Other reasons given were that the FW15C, and by extension, the FW16, were simply evolutions of the FW14 and FW14B, which had been designed to suit the driving style of Nigel Mansell. The major aerodynamic difference between the three cars was the anhedral rear wing and downward sloping rear bodywork of the FW16.

Adrian Newey was quoted in an interview in 2014, talking about the car in its original specification:

"To be honest we made a bloody awful cock-up. The rear-end grip problem was purely a setup problem. We were learning about springs and dampers all over again after concentrating on active suspension for two years, whereas most people had been away for just one. We also had a rather silly aerodynamic problem—basically, the front wing was too low—but that was raised for Imola, by which time we were looking in pretty good shape."

Newey was also quoted in the German Auto, Motor & Sport publication in 2015, talking about a test done at the Nigaro circuit in France:

"[The 1994 Nogaro test] ... confirmed that the car's side pods were too long, which meant that the aero was split from the diffuser when the nose of the car dipped and the side-pods got too close to the track."

Furthermore, Newey has stated that he and Senna were at odds regarding the development of the car, Senna suggesting that they further develop and use the FW15D in 1994 and Newey favouring the FW16.

In addition, at a television program on the 20th anniversary of Imola 1994, Gerhard Berger recalled a conversation he had with Senna at the race in which Senna said: "We are now finally aware of the problem with this car and in two or three weeks from now the problems should be solved." The FW16 indeed became more competitive after this timeframe.

== Variants ==
=== FW16B ===
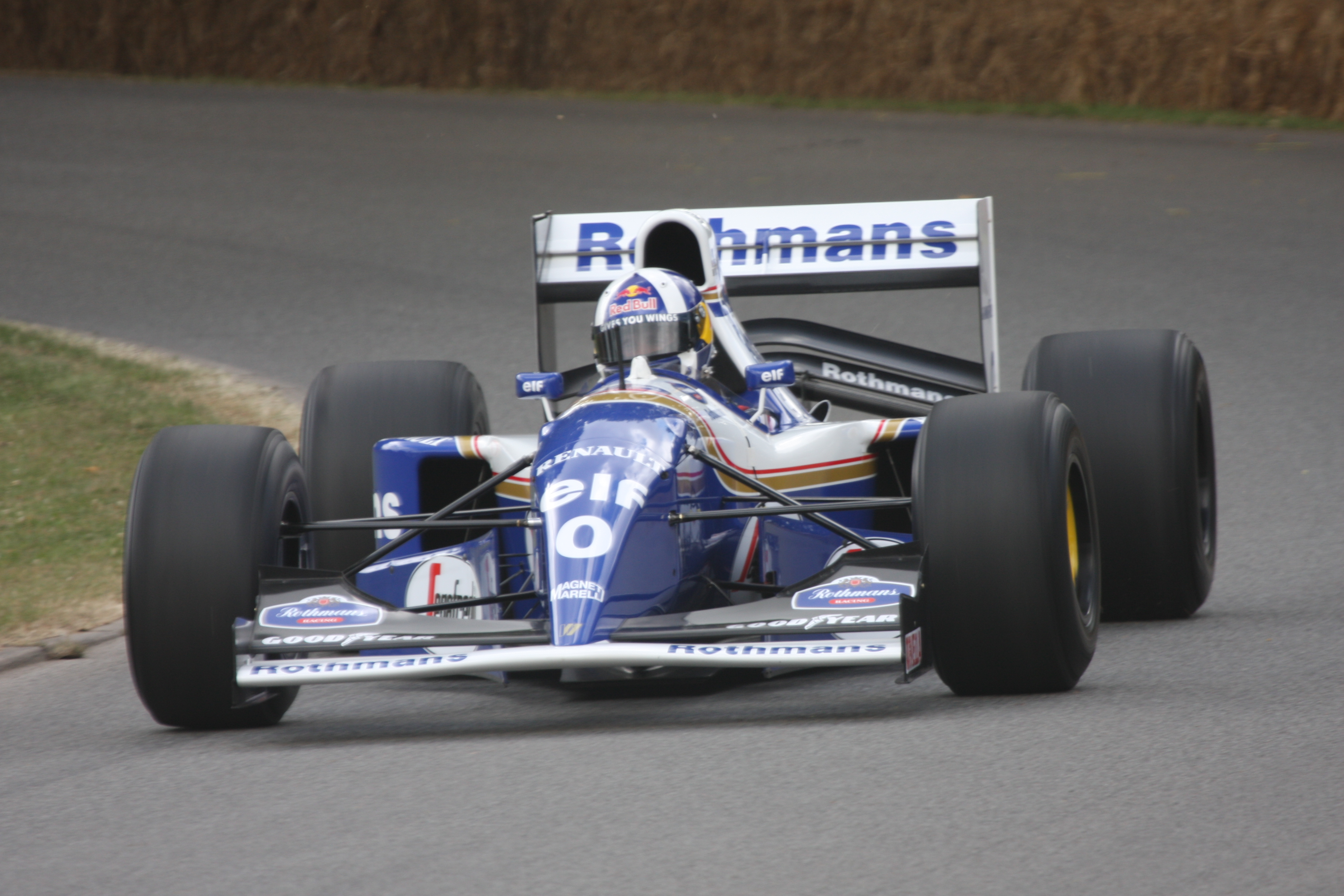
David Coulthard driving the FW16B at the 2009 Goodwood Festival of Speed

Following the Imola changes the car was again incrementally updated and labelled as FW16B by the German Grand Prix. This version featured a longer wheelbase, revised front and rear wing, shortened sidepods, and the compulsory opened rear on the airbox and cowling in accordance with FIA regulations following the accidents at Imola. The shortened sidepods arose due to a necessity to use larger bargeboards after the front wing endplate diffusers were banned. This version of the car proved to be very fast and competitive. Hill battled Schumacher for the championship but lost by a single point in the final race in Australia, Nigel Mansell won that race, securing the Constructors' Championship for Williams.

=== FW16C ===
The FW16C was a test car fitted with a 3-litre engine per the 1995 F1 regulations. It was used between 20 and 22 December in 1994 at Paul Ricard by Damon Hill, Jean-Christophe Boullion, and Emmanuel Collard.

== Sponsorship and livery ==
The car featured a distinctive blue and white livery after securing title sponsorship from Rothmans, replacing both Canon and Camel at the end of 1993.

Williams used the 'Rothmans' logos, except at French, British and German Grands Prix, where they were replaced with either "Racing" or a barcode with a generic tri-coloured rectangle that associated with the brand. At the Canadian Grand Prix, the 'Rothmans' was replaced with 'Rothmans Ltd.' (except on the rear wing), while the Rothmans patch was changed to replace the mini logo at the top with a red and blue Formula One car design.

At the Japanese Grand Prix, Williams had one-off sponsorship on the front wing and racing suits from Ueno Clinic.

== Complete Formula One results ==
(key) (results in bold indicate pole position; results in italics indicate fastest lap)

Year	Team	Engine	Tyre	Drivers	No.	1	2	3	4	5	6	7	8	9	10	11	12	13	14	15	16	Pts.	WCC
1994	Rothmans Williams	Renault RS6 / RS6B / RS6C; V10	**G**			BRA	PAC	SMR	MON	ESP	CAN	FRA	GBR	GER	HUN	BEL	ITA	POR	EUR	JPN	AUS	**118**	**1st**
1994	Rothmans Williams	Renault RS6 / RS6B / RS6C; V10	**G**	Damon Hill	0	2	Ret	6	Ret	1	2	**2**	**1**	8	2	1	1	1	2	1	Ret	**118**	**1st**
1994	Rothmans Williams	Renault RS6 / RS6B / RS6C; V10	**G**	Ayrton Senna	2	**Ret**	**Ret**	**Ret**														**118**	**1st**
1994	Rothmans Williams	Renault RS6 / RS6B / RS6C; V10	**G**	David Coulthard	2					Ret	5		5	Ret	Ret	4	6	2				**118**	**1st**
1994	Rothmans Williams	Renault RS6 / RS6B / RS6C; V10	**G**	Nigel Mansell	2							Ret							Ret	4	**1**	**118**	**1st**

== Sponsors ==
Brand	Country	Placed on
Rothmans	United Kingdom	Rear wing, fin, sidepods, front wing
Magnetti Marelli	Italy	Nose
Renault	France	Sides, nose
Elf	France	Sides, nose, mirrors
Segafredo	Italy	Side
Divella	Italy	Front wing end plate
