= Williams FW18 =

Formula one race car of 1996

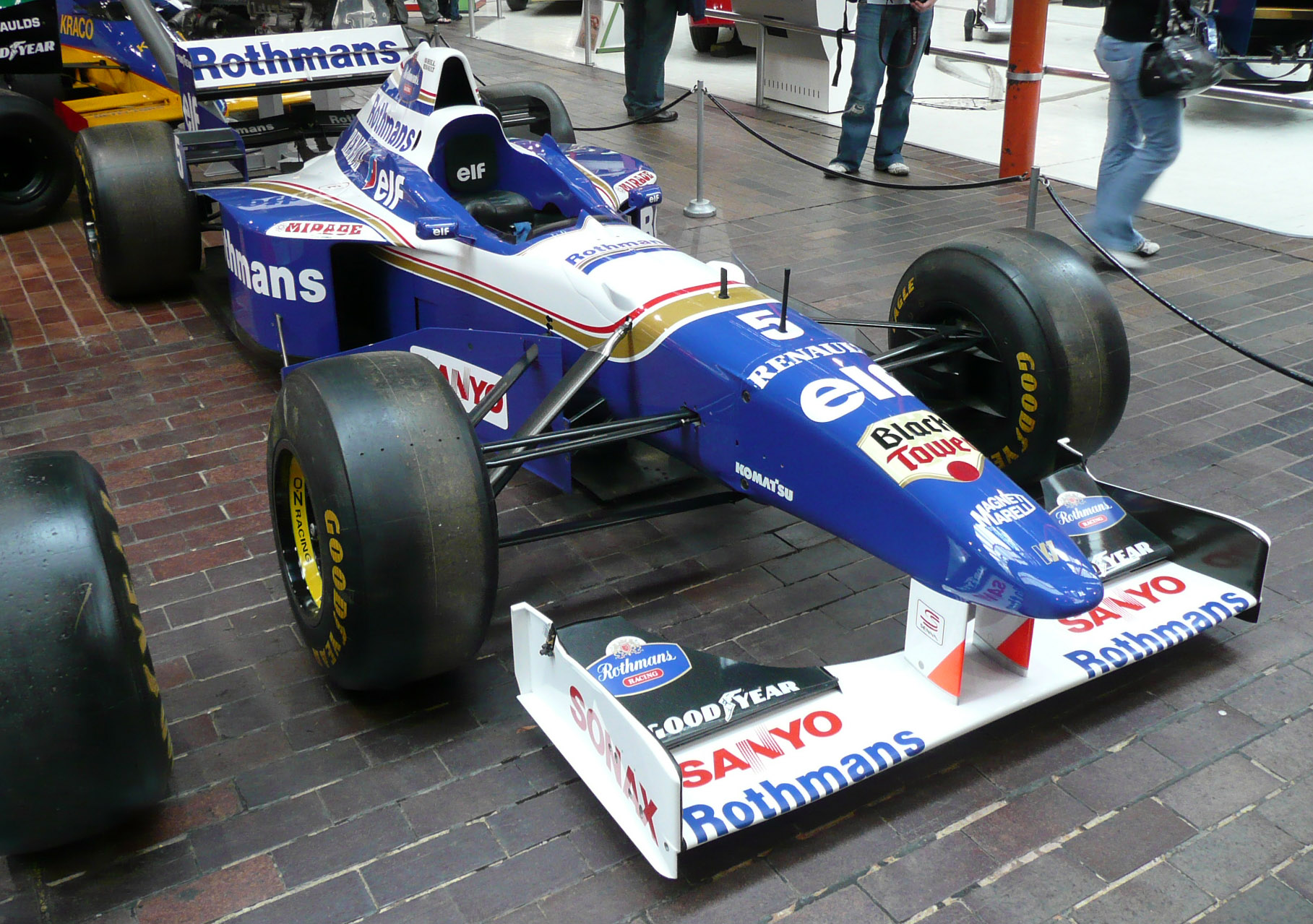
- The FW18 of Damon Hill on display at the National Motor Museum, Beaulieu
- Category: Formula One
- Constructor: Williams (chassis, transmission); Renault Sport (engine)
- Designers: Patrick Head (Technical Director); Adrian Newey (Chief Designer); Eghbal Hamidy (Chief Aerodynamicist); Bernard Dudot (Chief Engine Designer (Renault))
- Predecessor: Williams FW17
- Successor: Williams FW19

Technical specifications
- Chassis: Carbon/Epoxy composite monocoque
- Suspension (front): inboard torsion bars operated by pushrod bellcrank, unequal-length wishbones
- Suspension (rear): inboard torsion bars operated by pushrod bellcrank, unequal-length wishbones
- Engine: Renault RS8/RS8B 2,998 cc (182.9 cu in) V10 (67°) naturally aspirated mid-mounted
- Transmission: Williams 6-speed sequential semi-automatic
- Power: 700 hp (522 kW; 710 PS) @ 16,000 rpm
- Fuel: Elf
- Tyres: Goodyear

Competition history
- Notable entrants: Rothmans Williams Renault
- Notable drivers: 5. (United Kingdom) Damon Hill; 6. (Canada) Jacques Villeneuve
- Debut: 1996 Australian Grand Prix
- First win: 1996 Australian Grand Prix
- Last win: 1996 Japanese Grand Prix
- Last event: 1996 Japanese Grand prix
Races	Wins	Podiums	Poles	F/Laps
16 (all variants)	12	21	12	11
- Constructors' Championships: 1 (1996)
- Drivers' Championships: 1 (1996 - Damon Hill)

The Williams FW18 is a Formula One car used by the Williams F1 team to compete in the 1996 Formula One season. Designed by Adrian Newey and Patrick Head, it is one of the most successful F1 designs of all time.

The FW18s were driven by Damon Hill and Jacques Villeneuve. The car proved to be the most successful of the entire 1996 field; winning 12 of the 16 races during the season, with Hill winning 8 and Villeneuve winning 4. The FW18 was also the car in which Damon Hill won the Drivers' Championship title, making him the first son of a World Champion to become a Champion himself. The FW18 was also the second of three cars during the 1990s to enjoy a 1–2 finish on its Grand Prix debut, the first being the Williams FW14B at the 1992 South African Grand Prix and the third being the McLaren MP4/13 at the 1998 Australian Grand Prix. The FW18 scored 175 points in its time and was one of the most successful Formula One cars of the 1990s.

== Design ==
Powered by a 3.0 litre Renault V10 engine, the FW18 drew heavily on the 1995 Williams car, the FW17, but featured new driver protection as regulated by the FIA for the new season. The drivers sat lower in the cockpit, which lowered the car's centre of gravity, thus aiding the handling of the car. Newey's aerodynamics placed the car well ahead of the Benetton B196s of Gerhard Berger and Jean Alesi and the Ferrari F310s that Michael Schumacher and Eddie Irvine had at their disposal.

In pre-season testing, Hill covered over 9,000 km refining the new car. It was well balanced and pleasant to drive, responded well to setup changes, and was comfortable to sit in.

== Season performance ==
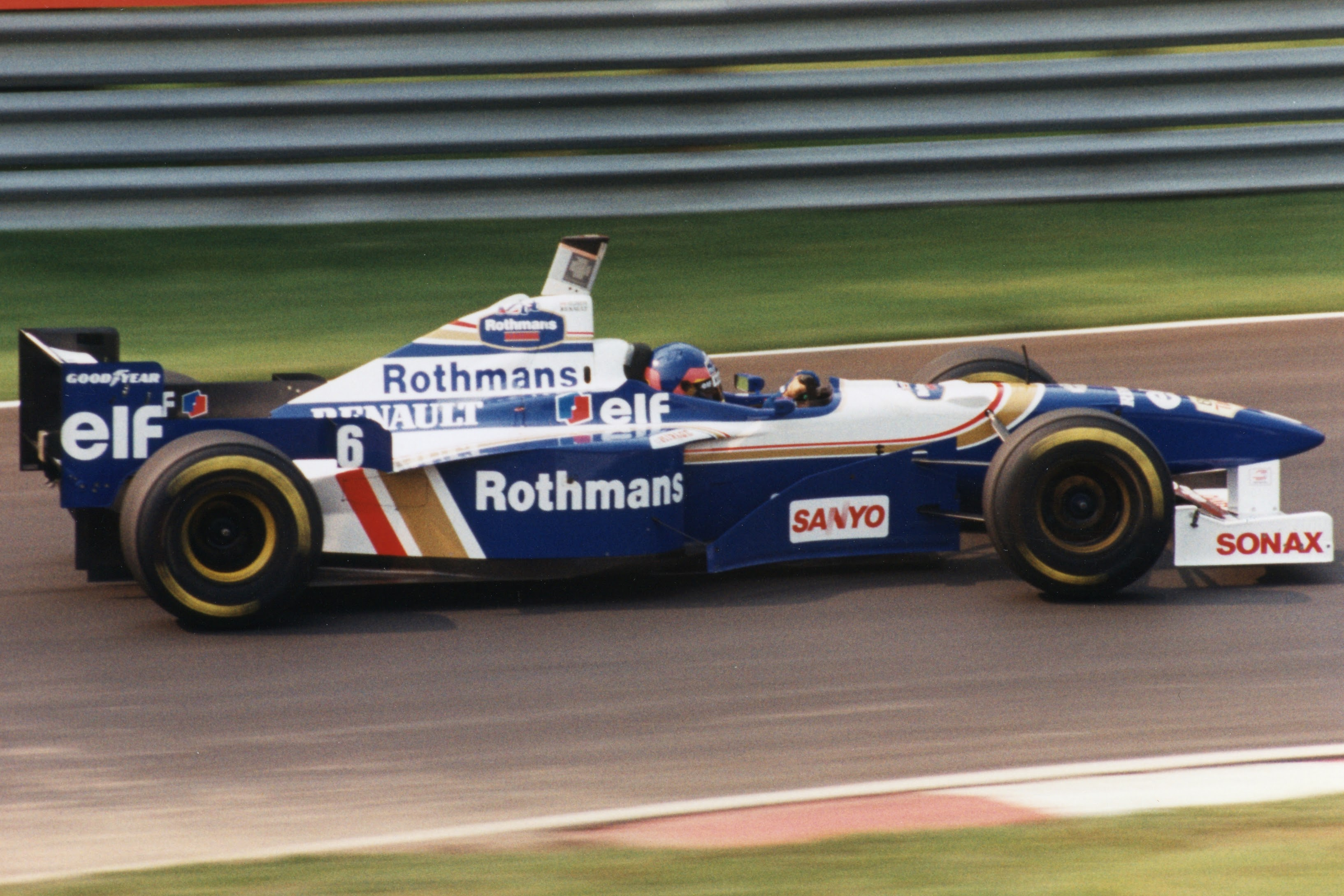
Jacques Villeneuve driving the Williams FW18 Formula One car at the 1996 Canadian Grand Prix. The Canadian would finish second, behind his teammate, Damon Hill. The Grand Prix was one of six occasions when the FW18s finished first and second.

Williams retained Damon Hill for 1996, who helped to develop the FW18, and the car seemed to respond well to his smooth driving style, while his new teammate, Formula One rookie Jacques Villeneuve, also quickly adapted to the FW18. The car was extremely reliable, as FW18s completed 1778 laps of a possible 2028, more than any other car that season. The car responded well to set-up changes and was competitive on all types of circuits, with Hill qualifying on the front row at every track and at least one Williams driver finishing on the podium for every race except for the Monaco and Italian Grands Prix, both of which saw Hill retire from the lead due to engine failure at the former and driver error at the latter.

The FW18's dominance was also due in part to the recent personnel changes at rival teams. Benetton (running the B196s of Gerhard Berger and Jean Alesi for 1996), which had previously bested Williams in the past two seasons, had lost Michael Schumacher and several key technical people to Ferrari. However, the Ferrari F310s that Schumacher and Eddie Irvine had at their disposal were unreliable and it would not be until 1997 that they could challenge for the Constructors' title.

The FW18 proved to be extremely successful during the season, as the car won twelve of the sixteen races and won the Constructors' Championship for Williams at the Hungarian Grand Prix with four rounds to spare. Their eventual winning margin of 105 points over second placed Ferrari was the second largest recorded in history at the time, behind only the McLaren MP4/4 that dominated the 1988 season.

Hill and Villeneuve fought a good natured but close intra-team title fight, with Hill winning six of the opening nine races to open up a points cushion, which he successfully defended in the second half of the season after Villeneuve began to mount a title challenge, the foundations of which were built upon a run of seven consecutive mid-season podium finishes.

The Championship title was eventually decided in the Englishman's favour at the final round in Suzuka after Hill won the Japanese Grand Prix and Villeneuve's car lost its right-rear wheel. This was after Williams team principal, Frank Williams, took the controversial decision to not re-sign Hill for the 1997 season. Also before the season concluded, designer Adrian Newey had been placed on "gardening leave" as he would join McLaren for 1998. The departures of Hill and Newey would signal the beginning of the end of Williams dominance in Formula One, only narrowly winning the Driver's and Constructor's titles in 1997 and failing to win a race in 1998; although they remained competitive up until 2004, with Patrick Head at the helm of engineering.

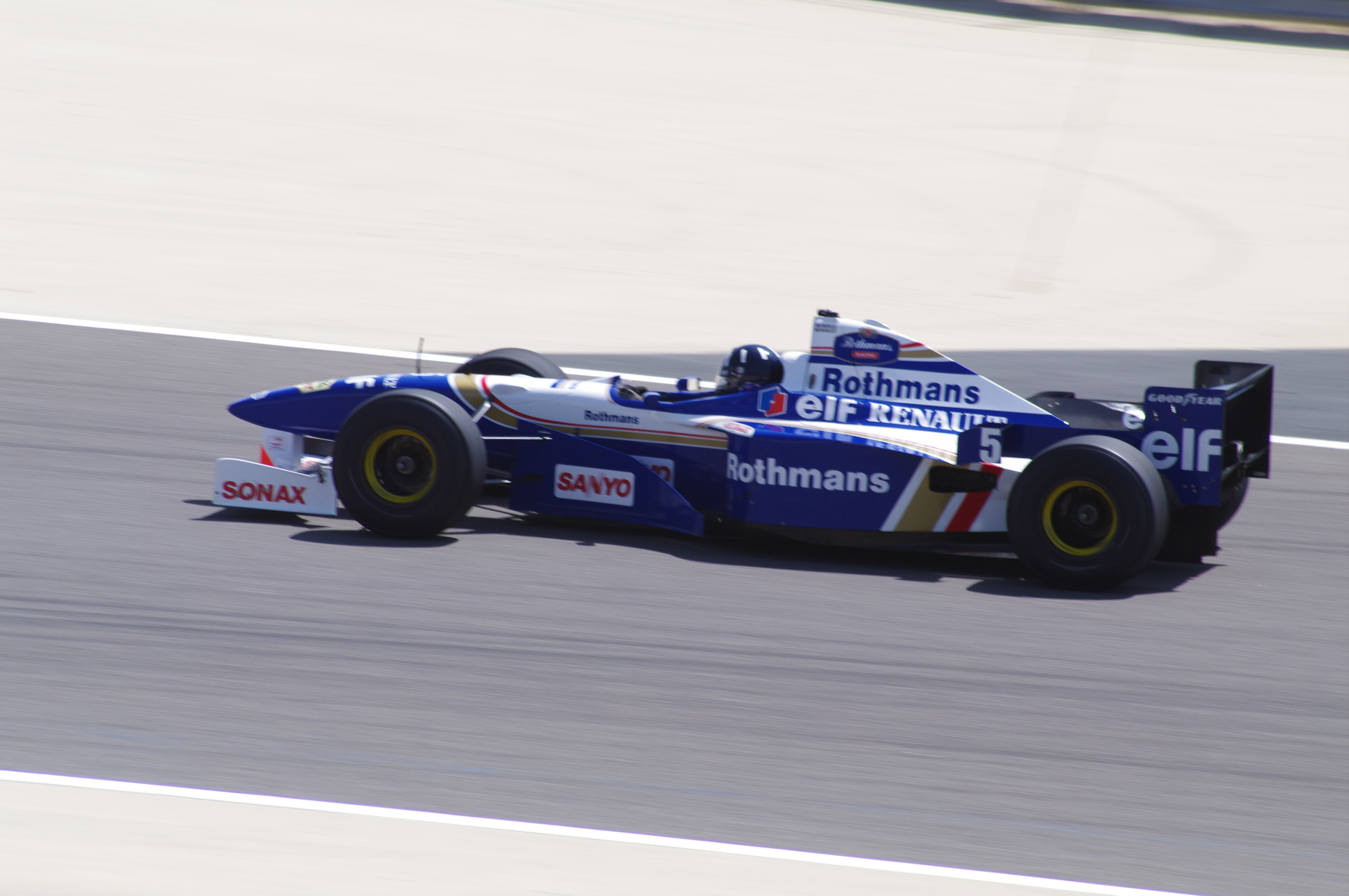
Damon Hill demonstrating the FW18 at the 2010 Bahrain Grand Prix.

== Livery ==
Williams retained their title sponsorship from Rothmans for a third season and with it kept the blue and white livery along with the company's racing stripes of gold and red along the bodywork. The cars showcased Rothmans logos, except at the European, French, British and German Grands Prix; which was replaced by either "Racing" or a barcode with a tricoloured generic rectangle that associated with the brand. In the French Grand Prix, the logo from sponsor Black Tower on the cars nosecone was removed.

== Later uses ==
Hill was re-united with the FW18 14 years after his championship year, as he demonstrated the car at the 2010 Bahrain Grand Prix.

Williams FW18 at Goodwood Festival of Speed 2010

== Other ==
The car appears in the games TOCA Race Driver 3, Formula One Championship Edition and F1 2013 as one of the classic cars in those games. In June 2017, it was announced that the car will reappear in F1 2017 along with the FW14B. In July 2018, it was announced that the car will again reappear as one of the returning classic cars in F1 2018, F1 2019 and F1 2020.

== Complete Formula One results ==
(key) (results in bold indicate pole position, results in italics indicate fastest lap)

Year	Entrant	Engine	Tyres	Drivers	1	2	3	4	5	6	7	8	9	10	11	12	13	14	15	16	Points	WCC
1996	Rothmans Williams Renault	Renault V10	**G**		AUS	BRA	ARG	EUR	SMR	MON	ESP	CAN	FRA	GBR	GER	HUN	BEL	ITA	POR	JPN	**175**	**1st**
1996	Rothmans Williams Renault	Renault V10	**G**	Damon Hill	1	**1**	**1**	**4**	1	Ret	**Ret**	**1**	1	**Ret**	**1**	2	5	**Ret**	**2**	1	**175**	**1st**
1996	Rothmans Williams Renault	Renault V10	**G**	Jacques Villeneuve	**2**	Ret	2	1	11	Ret	3	2	2	1	3	1	**2**	7	1	**Ret**	**175**	**1st**

== Sponsors ==
Brand	Country	Placed on
Rothmans	United Kingdom	Rear wing, fin, sidepods, front wing
Magnetti Marelli	Italy	Nose
Renault	France	Sides, nose
Elf	France	Sides, nose, mirrors, rear wing end plate
Sanyo	Japan	Front wing, barge board
Komatsu	Japan	Side
Black Tower	Germany	Nose
Mirage	Italy	Sidepods
Sonax	Germany	Front wing end plate

== Footnotes ==
Awards
Preceded by Williams FW17	Autosport; Racing Car Of The Year; 1996	Succeeded by Williams FW19
