= Hill–Schumacher rivalry =

Formula One racing rivalry

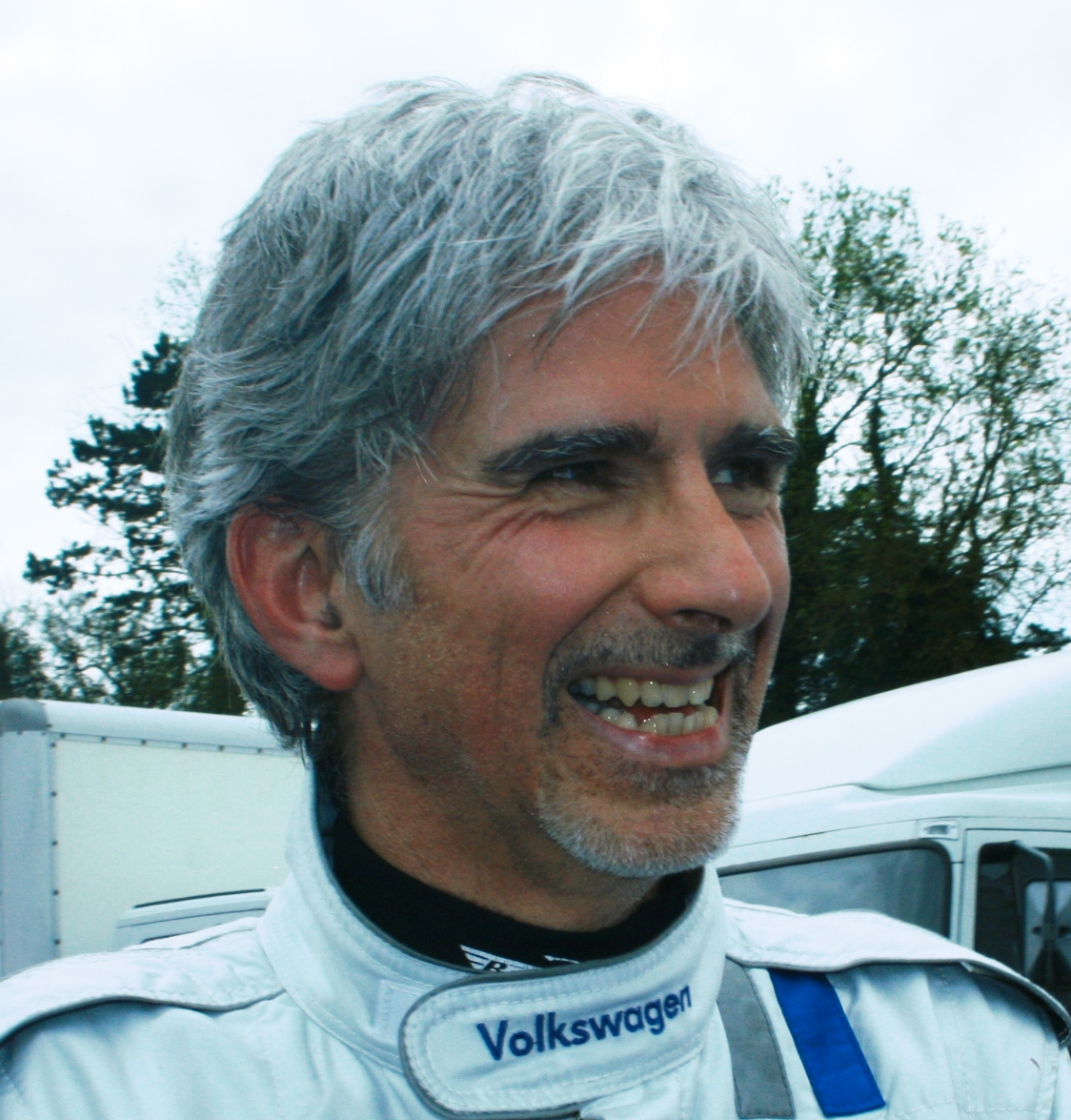
Damon Hill in 2012.

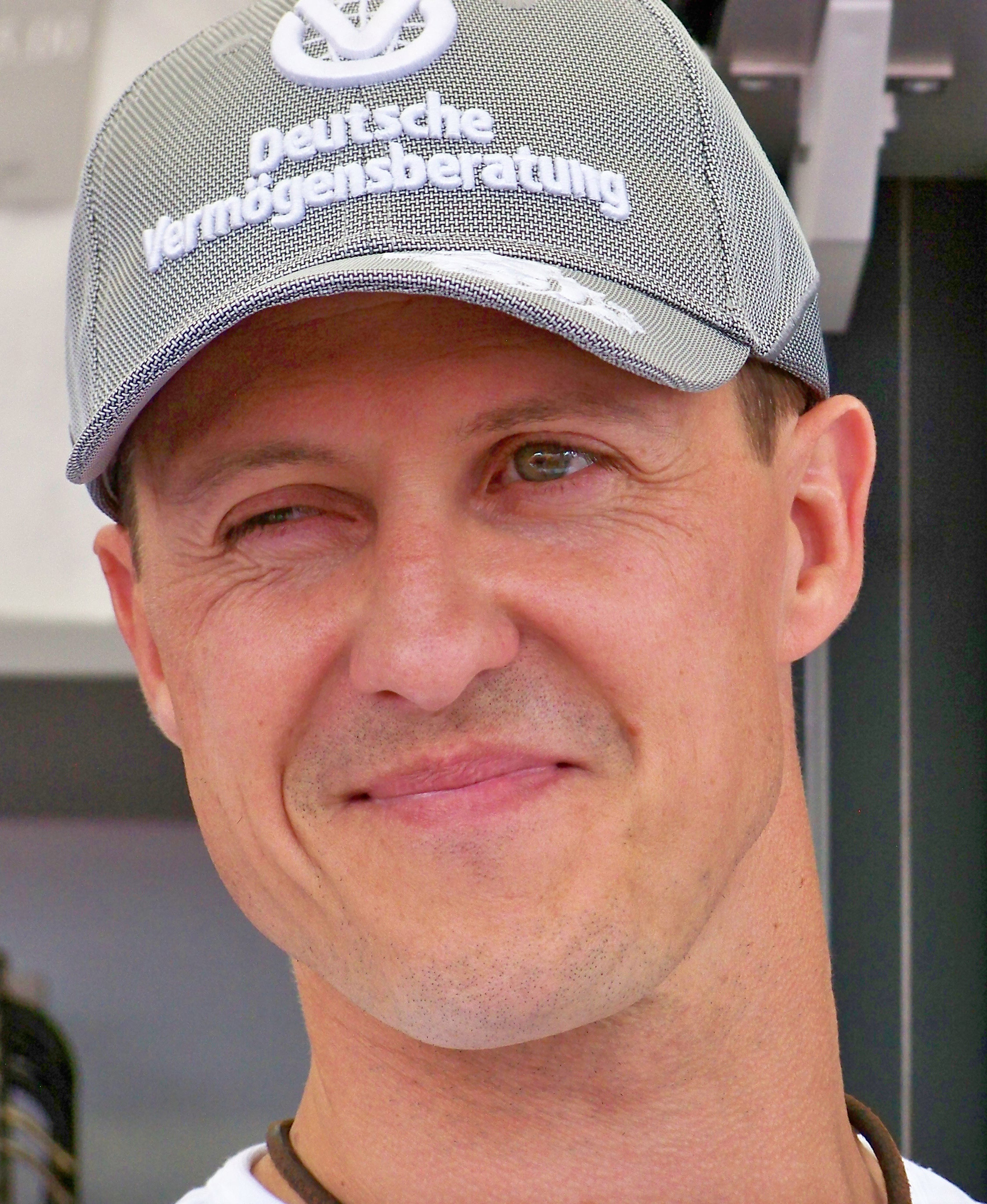
Michael Schumacher in 2010.

The Hill–Schumacher rivalry was an individual sport rivalry that ran from 1994 to 1996 between two Formula One drivers: the British Damon Hill and the German Michael Schumacher.

== History ==
Hill and Schumacher bonded in 1993 as both drivers were seen as the new prospects following years of competition between Ayrton Senna and Alain Prost. At the end of the 1993 season Schumacher and Hill went scuba diving together in Australia. The two drivers competed fiercely and somehow unexpectedly in the 1994 season. Hill was a mainstay for Williams after Ayrton Senna died at Imola. At the British Grand Prix, Schumacher was disqualified and banned for two further races for overtaking Hill during the formation lap and ignoring the subsequent black flag. Four more victories for Hill, three of which were in races where Schumacher was excluded or disqualified as in Belgium, where the Benetton's plank was found to be a few millimeters shorter than required, took the title battle to the final event at Adelaide. At Schumacher's first race since his ban, the European Grand Prix, he suggested that Hill (who was eight years his senior) was not a world-class driver. However, during the penultimate race at the Japanese Grand Prix, Hill took victory ahead of Schumacher in a rain-soaked event. This put Hill just one point behind the German before the last race of the season.

Neither Hill nor Schumacher finished the season-closing Australian Grand Prix, after a controversial collision which gave the title to Schumacher. Schumacher ran off the track hitting the wall with the right-hand side of his Benetton while leading. Coming into the sixth corner Hill moved to pass the Benetton and the two collided, breaking the Williams's front left suspension wishbone, and forcing both drivers' retirement from the race. BBC Formula One commentator Murray Walker had often maintained that Schumacher did not cause the crash intentionally, but Williams co-owner Patrick Head felt differently. In 2006 he said that at the time of the incident "Williams were already 100% certain that Michael was guilty of foul play" but did not protest Schumacher's title because the team was still dealing with the death of Ayrton Senna.

In 1995, the rivalry between Hill and Schumacher heated up with seven incidents that occurred in that season, two of which led to suspended one-race bans for both. Schumacher's penalty was for blocking and forcing Hill off the road at the Belgian Grand Prix; Hill's was for colliding with Schumacher under braking at the Italian Grand Prix. Hill initially took the lead after winning two of the opening three races. In the latter half of the season Schumacher outperformed Hill, who sportingly admitted that the best man won. A key moment was the European Grand Prix, where Schumacher annihilated the competition and won the race while Hill retired. During the final lap, Schumacher found Hill clapping at the side of the track. Afterwards, in the press conference, he acknowledged Hill's gesture saying 'we're not friends but we respect each other'.

The rivalry between Hill and Schumacher began to decline in 1996. In that season Hill won the world title after defeating his teammate Jacques Villeneuve. Meanwhile, Schumacher who moved to the struggling Ferrari was not expected to compete as a genuine title challenger, but nonetheless managed to win three races. At the final race in Japan, when asked about Hill's victory, Schumacher was complimentary. He congratulated Hill and praised his consistency through the season, stating that "a driver who manages to start every single race of the year on the front row and wins half of the races is a truly worthy champion".

Hill moved to Arrows for the 1997 season, and then moved again to Jordan for 1998. In those two teams he could not do much and then chose to retire at the end of the 1999 season. Meanwhile, Schumacher in 1997 competed tightly against Villeneuve and in 1998–1999 against Mika Häkkinen from McLaren. In 1999 Hill and Schumacher were put together by F1 Racing magazine for a joint interview. They reminisced about their careers and discussed their need to put themselves in a difficult position in order to keep things interesting, Schumacher having moved to Ferrari and Hill to Jordan when both teams were not front runners. Hill later remembered Schumacher as "friendly, charming and with a broad smile".

== Relationship after retirement ==
In 2007, Hill explicitly accused Schumacher of intentionally causing an incident at the 1994 Australian Grand Prix.

In 2010 Hill was one of the driver stewards at the Monaco Grand Prix and had to penalize Schumacher for dangerous driving. "In fact, he had been typically clever and he knew the rules had an ambiguous loophole. But you can imagine: the irony of it. He thought it was quite funny too".

Schumacher and Hill met for the last time at the Bahrain Grand Prix on March 13, 2010, where the organizers managed to put together 18 Formula One champions for one photo shoot.

In December 2017, coinciding with four years after Schumacher's ski accident, Hill recalled his rivalry with Schumacher and chose to forgive Schumacher's actions that had harmed him. He also added that what happened to his former rival is "beyond tragic", lamenting the fact that they will no longer be able to get to know each other better although "there is always hope".

== Formula One World Championship ==
Driver	Entries	Championships	Wins	Pole positions	Fastest laps
(United Kingdom) Damon Hill	1992–1999	1	22	20	19
(Germany) Michael Schumacher	1991–2006; 2010–2012	7	91	68	77

=== Head-to-head results ===
Driver	Championship position								Wins	Podiums	Championships
Driver	1992	1993	1994	1995	1996	1997	1998	1999	Wins	Podiums	Championships
(United Kingdom) Damon Hill	NC; Brabham	3rd Williams	2nd Williams	2nd Williams	1st Williams	12th Arrows	6th Jordan	12th Jordan	22	42	1
(Germany) Michael Schumacher	3rd Benetton	4th Benetton	1st Benetton	1st Benetton	3rd Ferrari	DSQ; Ferrari	2nd Ferrari	5th Ferrari	35	71	2
