= Patrick Head =

British engineer and car designer (born 1946)

Sir Patrick Head
- Born: Patrick Michael Head; 5 June 1946 (age 80); Farnborough, Hampshire, England
- Occupations: Formula One team co-founder Engineer
- Years active: 1970–
- Known for: Co-founder Williams Grand Prix Engineering
- Notable work: Williams World Drivers' and Constructors' championship-winning cars

Sir Patrick Michael Head (born 5 June 1946) is a British motorsport executive who is the co-founder and former Engineering Director of the Williams Formula One team. For 27 years starting from the 1977 season, Head was technical director at Williams Grand Prix Engineering, and responsible for many innovations within Formula One. Head oversaw the design and construction of Williams cars until May 2004 when his role was handed over to Sam Michael.

== Early career ==
Patrick Head was born into motor sport, his father Michael racing Jaguar sportscars in the 1950s, and was privately educated at Wellington College. After leaving school, Head joined the Royal Navy but soon realised that a career in the military was not how he wanted to spend his life and so left to attend university, first in Birmingham and later, after failing his first year exams, at UCL.

Head graduated in 1970 with a Mechanical Engineering degree, and immediately joined the chassis manufacturer Lola in Huntingdon. Here he formed a friendly relationship with John Barnard, whose Formula One designs for McLaren, Benetton and Ferrari would later go on to compete against Williams. Head was involved in a number of new projects all trying to become established as car builders or engineering companies and it was during this period that Head and Frank Williams met. Finally becoming disillusioned by his lack of success Head quit motor racing to work on building boats, but was lured back by Williams to join his team, which Head did during 1975.

In 1976, thirty-four-year-old Frank Williams decided that the time was right to re-form his own team and promptly set about luring Head back into Formula One. After one abortive attempt, on 8 February 1977 Williams Grand Prix Engineering was founded with Williams and Head taking seventy and thirty per cent of the company respectively. In 1977 the team raced a customer March chassis, but in 1978, with backing from Saudi Airlines and having signed Australian driver Alan Jones, the Head-designed FW06 made its first appearance. Despite having no money, and with Williams himself frequently forced to conduct business from a telephone box, Head still managed to design a respectable car.

The following season Williams scored 11 world championship points finishing 9th in the constructors' championship and from here momentum began to build. As early as the fourth round of the 1979 season Jones made the team's first visit to the podium. The same year saw a Head-designed car take the first of over one-hundred race wins when Swiss driver Clay Regazzoni won the British Grand Prix at Silverstone. Four more victories followed in 1979 and Head was now an established Grand Prix car designer.

== 1980s ==
Head's 1980 car was the class of the field, taking Alan Jones and the team to both titles, and securing Williams as a front runner. More success followed in the 1980s and Head began to move away from designing the cars himself, effectively creating a role of Technical Director, a person who oversaw the processes of design, construction, racing and testing, bringing together all the different disciplines. Frank Dernie took over as chief designer. During the 1980s he is also credited with many revolutionary concepts including a six-wheeled car, which tested in 1982, and continuously variable transmission, which replaced the car's conventional gearbox and allowed the engine to remain at optimum RPM during the entire lap. Neither system made it into racing due to rule changes, which many attribute to pressure from other teams, who were worried about the time required to develop similar systems of their own.

In 1986, Head, with other Williams management, was forced to assume control of the team when Frank Williams was seriously injured in a road accident. Despite this diversion, and under Head's temporary stewardship, the team still secured the constructors' title in 1986 and both the constructors' and drivers' title (with Nelson Piquet) in 1987.

In 1988, Head briefly tried his luck at actually racing. He made an appearance in the Celebrity Car in the inaugural Honda CR-X Challenge.

== 1990s ==
In 1990, Williams hired Adrian Newey, recently sacked as technical director of Leyton House Racing. The two engineers rapidly formed the outstanding design partnership of the 1990s with Head/Newey cars achieving a level of dominance never seen before, and not repeated until the Ferrari/Schumacher era a decade later. In a seven-year period between 1991 and 1997, Williams had fifty-nine race wins, won five constructors' titles, and four different drivers won world championships. Newey also had ambitions to succeed to technical director; this was blocked as Head was a founder and shareholder of the team. With Williams securing both the drivers' and constructors' titles in 1996, McLaren managed to lure Newey away, although he was forced to take gardening leave for the 1997 season.

== 2000s ==
Since the departure of Newey, Williams often appeared a spent force, able to win occasionally, but unable to mount a consistent challenge. During the dominant Ferrari/Schumacher period from 2000–2004, Williams managed to finish runner-up in the constructors' championship in 2002 and 2003, and 2003 was the closest that one of their drivers, Juan Pablo Montoya, got to the world title.

In 2004, Head moved to the position of Director of Engineering, as Sam Michael became Technical Director. After Head's move, Williams's decline continued and following Montoya's win at the 2004 Brazilian Grand Prix, they entered a lengthy period without a Grand Prix victory ended by Pastor Maldonado winning the 2012 Spanish Grand Prix.

== 2010s ==
In 2012, Head resigned from his position in the Williams team. He continued his involvement in Williams Hybrid Power Limited until it was sold to GKN in April 2014. In 2015, he received a knighthood for his services to motorsport. In March 2019, Head returned to Williams Racing for the first time in eight years in a consultancy role.

== Ayrton Senna accident ==
In April 2007, the Italian newspaper Gazzetta dello Sport reported that a court in Bologna had concluded that a technical failure was responsible for Ayrton Senna's fatal accident at the San Marino Grand Prix in 1994. Under Italian law, the responsibility for such an accident has to be proved but no action was taken against Head or Williams' Chief Designer Adrian Newey, neither of whom attended the court hearing. The court's findings were made public 13 years after the accident and the case was closed.

On 13 April 2007, the Italian Court of Appeal stated the following in the verdict numbered 15050: "It has been determined that the accident was caused by a steering column failure. This failure was caused by badly designed and badly executed modifications. The responsibility of this falls on Patrick Head, culpable of omitted control." Even being found responsible for Senna's accident, Head was not arrested because in Italy the statute of limitation for manslaughter is 7 years and 6 months, and the final verdict was pronounced 13 years after the accident.

== Honours ==
In 2002, Head was elected as a Fellow of the Royal Academy of Engineering (FREng). In the 2015 Queen's Birthday Honours, Head was appointed a Knight Bachelor "for services to Motorsport".
