= Rothmann =

Rothmann is surname of:

- Bernhard Rothmann (c. 1495 – c. 1535) reformer and Anabaptist leader of Münster
- Christoph Rothmann (c. 1550/60 – 1600) German mathematician
- Max Rothmann (1868–1916), German neuroanatomist
- Maria Elizabeth Rothmann (1875–1975), Afrikaans writer
- Howard Rothmann Bowen (1908–1989), American economist
- Ralf Rothmann (born 1953), German novelist and poet
- John Rothmann (born 1949), a radio talk show host, and author

== See also ==
- Rothmann (crater)
- Rothman
- Rotman (disambiguation)
- Roitman
- Rottmann, Rottman
- Rottmanner
- Rothemann
