= Roitman =

Surname

Roitman is an Ashkenazi Jewish surname. Notable people with the surname include:

- A. A. Roitman, mathematician who introduced Roitman's theorem
- David Roitman (born 1884), Russian-American hazzan and composer
- Janet Roitman, American anthropologist known for her research based on fieldwork in Central Africa
- Judith Roitman (born 1945), mathematician, currently a professor at the University of Kansas
- Sergio Roitman (born 1979), Argentine tennis player
- Volf Roitman (born 1930), painter, sculptor and architect, son of Russian/Romanian parents
- Jakob Roitman, birth name of Iosif Chișinevschi (1905–1963), Romanian communist politician

== Fictional characters ==
- Odete Roitman, a villain (played by the actresses Beatriz Segall and Débora Bloch) in the Brazilian telenovelas Vale Tudo (1988-89) and its remake (2025)

== See also ==
- Reutemann
- Rotman (disambiguation)
- Rothmann
- Rothman
- Rottmann
- Rottman
