= Rottmanner =

Rottmanner is a surname. Notable people with the surname include:

- Eduard Rottmanner (1809–1843), German composer and organist
- Karl Borromäus Rottmanner (1783–1824), German poet, philosopher, and politician
- Simon Rottmanner (1740–1813), German writer, agrarian reformer, jurist, landowner, and accountant
