= Rothmans =

Rothmans may refer to:

- Rothmans, Benson & Hedges, a Canadian tobacco company
- Rothmans International, a former British tobacco manufacturer, founded by Louis Rothman

== See also ==
- Rothman, a surname
- Rothmans 12 hours, a series of sports car races in Gold Coast, Australia
- Rothmans 50,000, a 1972 motor race held at Brands Hatch, England
- Rothmans 100,000, a horse race in Brisbane, Australia
- Rothmans Canadian Open or Canada Masters, a tennis tournament
- Rothmans European F5000 Championship, an auto-racing formula
- Rothmans Football Yearbook, now The Football Yearbook, an annual reference work
- Rothmans Grand Prix, now World Open, a snooker tournament
- Rothmans International Series, an Australian motor racing competition
- Rothmans International Tennis Tournament, a men's tennis tournament in London
- Rothmans Malaysian Masters, a golf tournament
- Rothmans Medal, an award in Australian Rugby League
- Rothmans Porsche, a motor racing team
- Rothmans Sun-7 Series, a touring car racing series in Sydney, Australian
