= Rottman =

Rottman is a surname. Notable people with the surname include:

- Stormy Rottman (1918–1993), American weather forecaster and television host
- Gordon L. Rottman (born 1947), American author
- Marian E. Rottman (1882–1955), American nurse
- Ryan Rottman (born 1978), American television actor

== See also ==
- 23851 Rottman-Yang, main-belt asteroid
- Rottmann
- Rotman (disambiguation)
- Rotman School of Management
