= Voalte =

American clinical communication software company

Voalte was a clinical communication software company headquartered in Sarasota, Florida.

== History ==
Voalte was founded in 2008 by Trey Lauderdale, Oscar Callejas, Benjamin King, and former Microsoft and Apple executive Rob Campbell. In October 2012, the company received $6 million in funding to increase the company size to 150 by the end of 2013 and continue product development. Voalte currently has more than 60,000 Apple iPhones, Zebra MC40-HCs, Spectralink PIVOTs and Honeywell Dolphin CT50hs installed in 290 hospitals nationwide, which are used by 215,000 healthcare professionals. The deployments range from 25 phones to 3,800 phones in healthcare systems with multiple facilities.

Voalte is installed in hospitals such as The University of Iowa Hospitals and Clinics, Cedars-Sinai Medical Center, Texas Children's Hospital, and Sarasota Memorial Health Care System. Sarasota Memorial Hospital was an early adopter of Voalte, investing $750,000 in the system. In February 2014, the 150-employee company received an investment of $35.9 million from Bedford Funding to expand its team and enhance its products.

Executive Team: Trey Lauderdale is founder and CEO of Voalte. Trey graduated from the University of Florida with a bachelor's degree in industrial engineering and a master's degree in entrepreneurship from the University of Florida Warrington College of Business. Prior to his role at Voalte, Trey gained healthcare industry experience with companies such as Siemens and Emergin.

Oscar Callejas is the chief experience officer and head of the Services department. He graduated from the University of Miami with a double major in business management and international finance and marketing. He earned his master's degree in entrepreneurship from the University of Florida Warrington College of Business.

Rob Campbell is a former Microsoft and Apple executive, and the founder of PowerPoint. Rob helped launch Voalte in 2008 and transferred the reins to Trey Lauderdale as president in March 2013.

In 2019, Hillrom Holdings acquired Voalte for approximately $180 million.

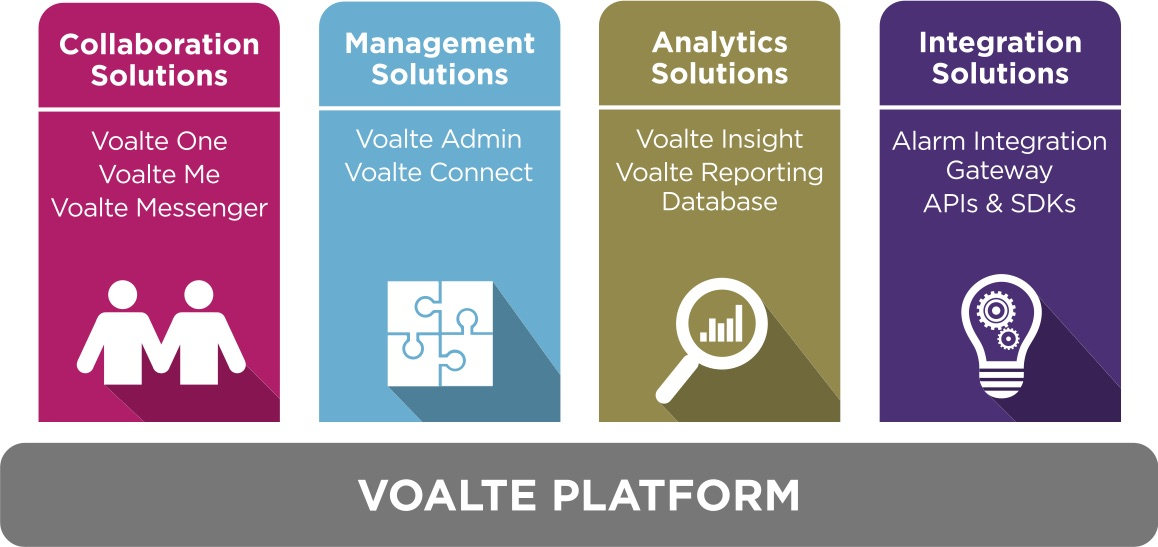

== Voalte Platform ==
Voalte Platform is a healthcare communication that includes the following Voalte applications and integrates with existing hospital systems.

=== Voalte One ===
Voalte One is a clinical communication smartphone application. The application includes three components: voice calls, alarm notifications and text messaging. Voice calls are placed on the hospital's VoIP system through the hospital's PBX and Wi-Fi system. The alarm notifications are received through integration with hospital systems and devices. Text messages are sent within the application using the contact directory.

Voalte One is available for iOS on the iPhone and for Android on the Zebra MC40-HC, Spectralink PIVOT and Honeywell Dolphin CT50h. The MC40-HC also includes a built-in 2D barcode scanner to facilitate medication administration.

=== Voalte Me ===
Voalte Me connects caregivers outside the hospital with Voalte One users inside the hospital. Using personal smartphones, care teams communicate via cellular or Wi-Fi connections. Voalte Me gives doctors and other clinicians a more secure alternative to standard texting.

=== Voalte Messenger ===
Voalte Messenger is a web client that lets desk-based staff exchange secure text messages with Voalte One and Voalte Me users from a desktop, laptop or workstation on wheels.

=== Voalte Connect ===
Voalte Connect is a mobile device management system that activates, monitors, and supports the devices through a secure platform. It uses the technology of the Airwatch platform and allows hospitals to manage the smartphones from a central location in the hospital.
