= Laurent Feniou =

Laurent Eugene Feniou (born June 1971) is the managing director of Cartier. He succeeded Arnaud Bamberger in 2015.

In 2013, Feniou moved from Rothschild, where he had been the managing director since May 2001. Prior to Rothschild, Feniou was a naval officer working for the French embassy in Madrid, Spain. Feniou is tri-lingual; he speaks English, French and Spanish. He is married with two sons.
