= Rothman Healthcare =

PeraHealth
- Type: Privately Held
- Industry: Health informatics
- Founded: 2005
- Headquarters: Charlotte, North Carolina, United States of America
- Products: Rothman Index
- Website: http://www.perahealth.com

Rothman Healthcare Corporation is a healthcare technology company that provides Electronic Health Record (EHR) systems for hospital application platforms. The company offers software for visualizing patient data and generating patient health scores.

== History ==
The Rothman Index is named in honor of Florence Rothman. In 2003, Rothman underwent an operation to replace a heart valve at Sarasota Memorial Hospital. Although her health initially improved after the operation, it gradually worsened until she died 10 days after the operation. Her sons, Michael and Steven Rothman, determined that it was the overall system of care that failed her by not detecting her gradual health deterioration. Their solution was to develop a simple measure of a patient’s overall condition that can be plotted versus time to show a doctor or a nurse whether a patient is recovering or deteriorating. They worked with Sarasota Memorial Hospital by analyzing thousands of patient records in the Electronic Health Record to develop the Rothman Index.

== The Rothman Index ==
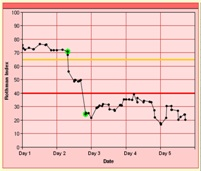
A snapshot of a patient Rothman Index graph.

The Rothman Index captures data found in a hospital's electronic health record and displays the progression of a patient's health over time. The Rothman Index generates a regularly updated health score synthesizing routine vital signs, nursing assessments, and lab results, for display in a user-friendly graphical format, summarizing thousands of pages of patient data at a glance. The Rothman Index simplifies the tracking of patient progress and detects subtle declines in health. Rapid response teams, physicians, and nurses have the ability to see multiple patient graphs simultaneously. This allows for earlier interventions and a summarized understanding of a whole unit.

The Rothman Index solution has been contracted by Sarasota Memorial Hospital, Blessing Hospital, Orlando Health, The Methodist Hospital System in Houston, Yale – New Haven Hospital, Shannon Health in Texas and Shands HealthCare & the University of Florida as well as other hospitals.

== Rothman Healthcare becomes Pera Health Inc. ==
In 2011, Rothman Healthcare became Pera Health, Inc.
