= Joseph Graetz =

German composer, organist, and music educator

Joseph Graetz (2 December 1760 – 17 July 1826) was a German composer, organist, and music educator.

== Career ==
Graetz was born in Vohburg on the Danube. He received musical training at Rohr Abbey, near Abensberg, Bavaria, and went to school in Ingolstadt. He became a pupil of Michael Haydn in Salzburg and also studied briefly with Ferdinando Bertoni in Venice. After several travels through Italy he settled in Munich in 1788 where he was mainly active as a composer and music teacher.

In 1790, two of his stage works premiered: the operetta Das Gespenst mit der Trommel and the opera Adelheid von Veltheim. His most notable students included Caspar Ett, Josef Alois Ladurner, Peter Josef von Lindpaintner, Eduard Rottmanner, and Jakob Zeugheer.

He died in Munich.

== Sources ==
- Moritz Fürstenau (1879). "Graetz, Josef" . Allgemeine Deutsche Biographie (in German). Vol. 9. Leipzig: Duncker & Humblot. pp. 602–603.
