= Jakob Zeugheer =

Swiss violinist, conductor and composer

Jakob Zeugheer (known also as J. Z. Herrmann; 20 July 1803 in Zürich – 15 June 1865 in Liverpool) was a Swiss violinist, conductor and composer.

== Childhood ==
Born at Zürich in 1803, Zeugheer learned the violin first from Heinrich Joseph Wassermann in his native town, and in 1818 was placed at Munich under Ferdinand Fränzl, for the violin, and Joseph Graetz for composition and musical science. A visit to Vienna in 1823 confirmed his enthusiasm for chamber-music and Beethoven, who remained through life the object of his highest veneration.

== Career as a quartet player ==
The example of Schuppanzigh, and of the four brothers Moralt, suggested to Zeugheer the idea of attempting the same with his friends in Munich, as "das Quartett Gebrüder Herrmann". Zeugheer was leader; Joseph Wex of Immenstadt, second violin; Carl Baader, viola; and Joseph Lidel (grandson of Andreas Lidel, the eminent performer on the baryton), violoncello. They started Aug. 34, 1824, for the south, and gave performances at the towns of south Germany and Switzerland, and along the Rhine to the Netherlands and Belgium. In the spring of 1826 they played in Paris, before Cherubini and Pierre Baillot, and gave a public performance assisted by Henriette Sontag and Alexandre Boucher with his sons. They first performed in Paris Spohr's double quartet in D minor, the second quartet being played by Boucher and his three sons.

=== In Britain ===
From Boulogne the quartet crossed the Channel; in England they seem to have been successful, at Dover, Ramsgate, and especially at Brighton, where they resided for five months. They gave concerts throughout the South and West of England, and in Ireland from Cork to Dublin, where they arrived in November 1827.

Early in 1828 they proceeded by Belfast to Glasgow, Edinburgh and London. In London they had only a few engagements in private houses; Wex retired ill, and the quartet was broken up till a new violinist was found in Anton Popp of Würzburg. The concerts begun again with a series of six at Liverpool in the summer of 1829, and were continued through the northern counties. But in the spring of 1830 the "brothers" had had enough of a roving life. Zeugheer and Baader settled at Liverpool, Lidel and Popp at Dublin. Zeugheer resided in Liverpool till his death, Baader till his retirement in 1869.

Zeugheer's quartet was only the second ever to perform in England, and were the first to play in England any but the first six of Beethoven's quartets. In many towns they found that no one knew what a quartet was.

== Career as a conductor ==
In 1831 Zeugheer took the conductorship of the Gentlemen's Concerts at Manchester, which he retained till 1838. The Liverpool Philharmonic Society, originally a private society, began in January 1840 to give public concerts with an orchestra, and in 1843 appointed Zeugheer director. He conducted their concerts from that date until March 28, 1865, shortly before his death, which took place suddenly June 15, 1865.

== Career as a teacher ==
Zeugheer was highly praised for his work as a teacher in Liverpool. Although not a pianist, he fully understood the art of training the hand. Mr. Chorley, the musical critic of the "Athenaeum", never had any musical teacher but Zeugheer, whose genius he estimated highly and proclaimed in print. According to Grove's Dictionary of Music and Musicians, Zeugheer's playing was very pure in tone and refined in expression, though his position was not favourable to original composition.

== Compositions ==
He wrote two Symphonies, two Overtures, a Cantata, two sets of Entr'actes, a Violin Concerto op. 28, a Potpourri for violin and orchestra op. 6, an instrumental Quartet, an Andante and Rondo for piano and violin op. 21, and a Polacca fur four voices, few of them published. In Liverpool he wrote an opera Angela of Venice to Chorley's words, but it was neither produced nor published, owing to the badness of the libretto. He published two sets of waltzes, a vocal duet "Come, lovely May", and other songs and glees.

The John Rylands Library in Manchester holds the manuscript of a Kyrie by Zeugheer, possibly in the composer's hand. It is dated 1832 and dedicated to a William Hudson. The work is in B minor and is scored for SATB choir, soloists and piano.

== Sources ==
- Grove, George (1889). Fuller-Maitland, J A (ed.). A Dictionary of Music and Musicians, volume iv. London: Macmillan. OCLC 19025639. Article "Zeugheer, Jakob".
- This article incorporates text from the entry Zeugheer, Jakob in the first edition of Grove's Dictionary of Music and Musicians (published 1879-1889) which is in the public-domain
- Grove, George (1900). "Zeugheer, Jakob" . A Dictionary of Music and Musicians. Vol. 4.8. p. 507.
