= Rothman =

Rothman (German/Yiddish: Rothmann) is a surname. Notable people with the surname include:

- Barbara Katz Rothman (born 1948), American sociologist
- Benny Rothman (1911–2002), political activist
- David Rothman (statistician) (1935–2004), statistician
- David Rothman (medical historian), professor of medicine
- Einar Rothman (1888–1952), Swedish track and field athlete
- Elise Rothman, fictional character from the television series Charmed
- Gertjan Rothman (born 1983), Dutch footballer
- Göran Rothman (1739–1778), Swedish naturalist and physician
- James Rothman (born 1950), American cell biologist and 2013 Nobel Laureate in Physiology or Medicine
- John Rothman (born 1949), American actor
- Joni Robbins (born Joan Eva Rothman), American voice actress
- Judy Rothman, American screenwriter and lyricist
- Julia Rothman, fictional character from the novel Scorpia
- Katherine Rothman, American entrepreneur
- Ken Rothman (1935–2019), American politician; Lieutenant Governor of Missouri
- Kenneth Rothman (epidemiologist) (born 1945)
- Lorraine Rothman (1932–2007), activist
- Louis Rothman (1869–1926), British tobacconist and founder of Rothmans International
- M. A. Rothman, American inventor and speculative fiction writer
- Makua Rothman (born 1984), American surfer
- Marion Rothman (1928–2023), American film editor
- Mark Rothman, American writer and producer of Laverne and Shirley
- Milton A. Rothman (1919–2001), American nuclear physicist
- Norman Rothman (1914–1985), American gangster
- Richard B. Rothman, pharmacologist
- Rodney Rothman, screenwriter
- Sandy Rothman (born 1946), bluegrass musician and producer
- Stephanie Rothman (born 1936), film director
- Steve Rothman (born 1952), politician
- Thomas Rothman (born 1954), CEO of FOX Filmed Entertainment
- Tony Rothman (born 1953), physicist

== See also ==
- Rothman Center, a sports arena in Hackensack, New Jersey
- Rothman Healthcare, an American medical software company
- Rothmans (disambiguation)
