= Yenidje Tobacco Company Limited =

Former British tobacco company

Yenidje Tobacco Company Limited was a British tobacco company founded in 1913 by Louis Rothman and Markus Weinberg. The company was named for the town of Yenidje, Thrace (modern Genisea, Greece), a leading producer of high-quality Oriental tobaccos for cigarettes.

A dispute over business strategy lead to the dissolution of the company by the Court of Appeal's decision In re Yenidje Tobacco Co Ltd [1916] 2 Ch 426, which remains a leading authority on the dissolution of partnerships.
