= Arnaud Bamberger =

French businessman (born 1945)

- Born: Arnaud Marie Bamberger; August 1945 (age 80); France
- Occupations: Director, Cartier; Executive Chairman, Cartier
- Years active: 1992 - 2015
- Awards: Legion of Honour

Arnaud Marie Bamberger (born August 1945) was the former Director and Executive Chairman of Cartier.

== Early life ==
Bamberger was born in France to a branch of the Lumière family and studied both philosophy and economics in Paris, France.

== Career ==
During the mid-seventies whilst working as Sales Promotion Director for Rothmans, Bamberger was noticed by the then President of Cartier, Alain Dominique Perrin for his language abilities. He is tri-lingual. Arnaud subsequently spent several years as Cartier’s Export Director, based in Paris before moving to New York City where he took up the role of Vice President of retail, opening up 15 stores there. In 1987, he returned to France where after five years of working in Paris, he headed to London, England he remained Managing Director until his retirement in December 2015. In September 2010, Cartier International announced Arnaud Bamberger’s appointment into the new position of Cartier UK Executive Chairman.

== Awards ==
- Chevalier de l’Ordre National de le Légion d’Honneur (awarded 21 April 2009).
