= Eduard Rottmanner =

German composer and organist

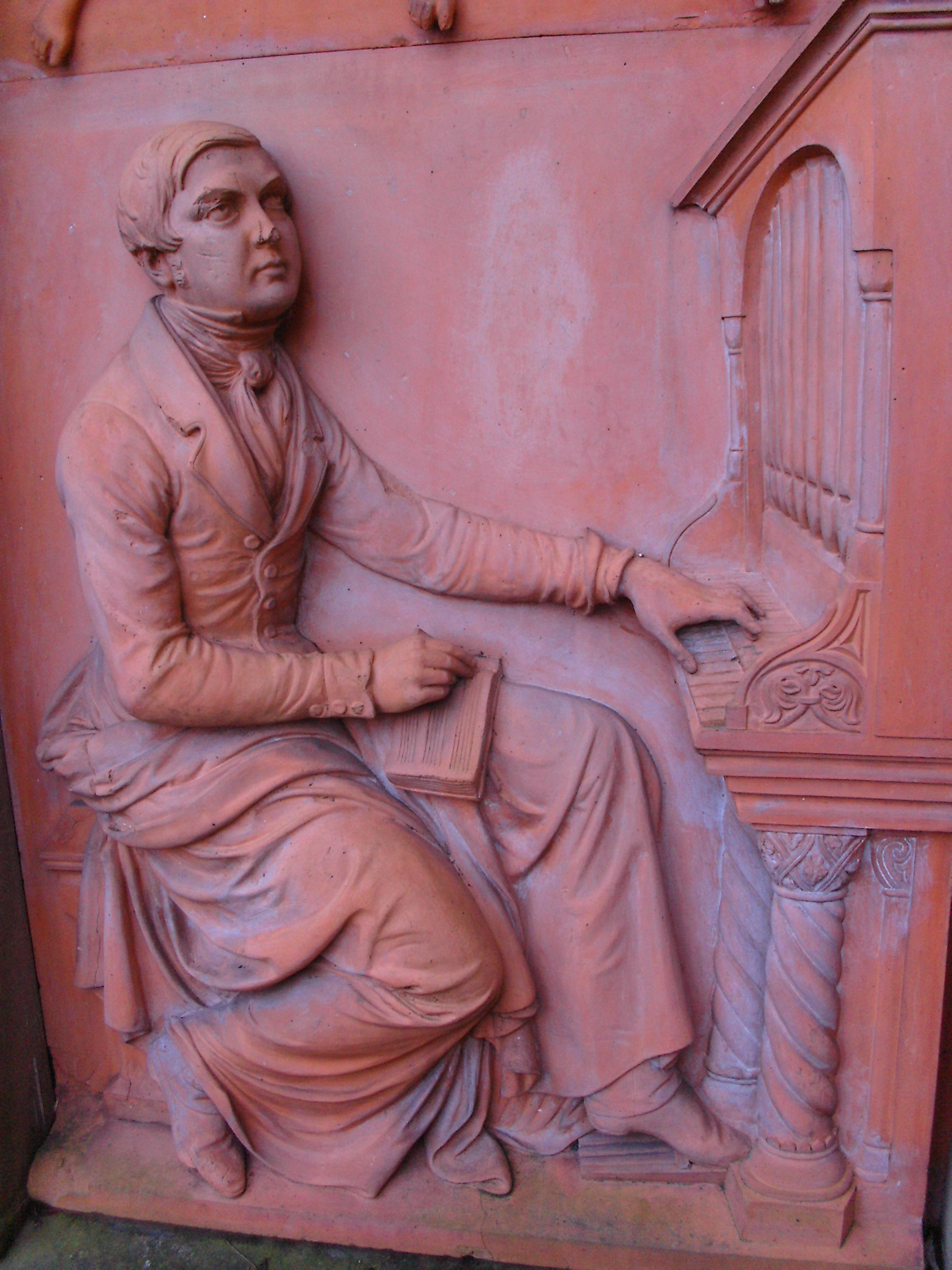
Eduard Rottmanner composing - detail from his tombstone, old cemetery Speyer

Eduard Rottmanner (2 September 1809 – 4 May 1843) was a German composer and organist.

Rottmanner was born in Munich and was the cousin of German poet, philosopher, and politician Karl Rottmanner, and the great-nephew of lawyer Simon Rottmanner. He studied the organ and music composition with Joseph Graetz and Caspar Ett. In 1828, he entered the Ludwig-Maximilians-Universität München where he studied philosophy, logic, history, physics, and statistics. During that time he continued taking music lessons privately and held organist posts at various churches in Munich, including the Bürgersaalkirche, the Herzogspitalkirche, and St. Michael's Church, Munich. In 1839, he was appointed organist of the Speyer Cathedral, a post he held until his death four years later.
