= Royal Liverpool Philharmonic =

English symphony organisation

- Orchestra
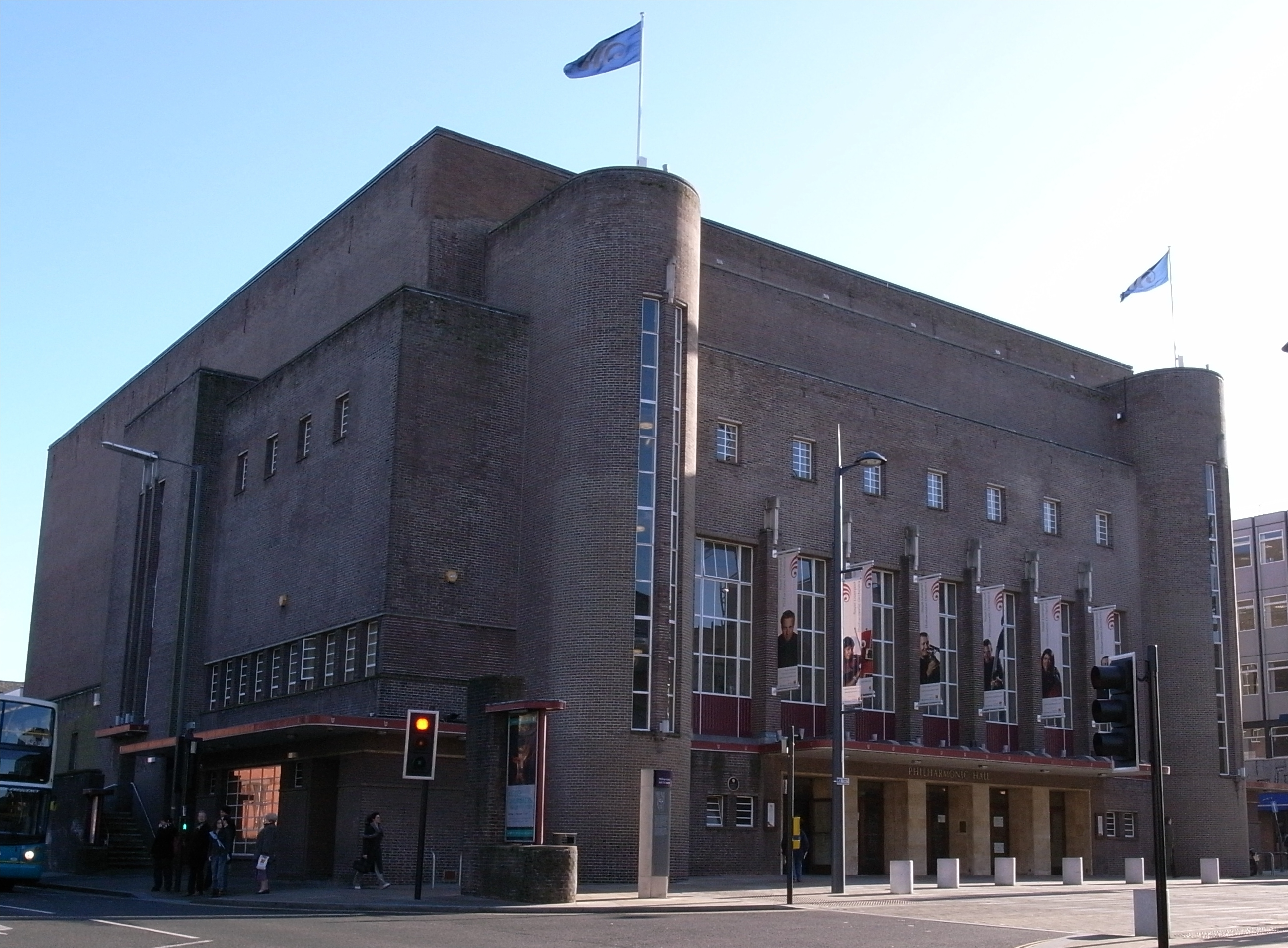
- Founded: 1840
- Concert hall: Liverpool Philharmonic Hall
- Principal conductor: Domingo Hindoyan
- Website: liverpoolphil.com

Royal Liverpool Philharmonic is a music organisation based in Liverpool, England, that manages a professional symphony orchestra, a concert venue, and extensive programmes of learning through music. Its orchestra, the Royal Liverpool Philharmonic Orchestra, is the UK's oldest continuing professional symphony orchestra. In addition to the orchestra, the organisation administers the Royal Liverpool Philharmonic Choir, the Liverpool Philharmonic Youth Company and other choirs and ensembles. It is involved in educational and community projects in Liverpool and its surrounding region. It is based in the Liverpool Philharmonic Hall, an Art Deco concert hall built in the late 1930s. The Royal Liverpool Philharmonic Society is a registered charity under English law.

== History ==
=== 19th century ===
The organisation has its origins in a group of music amateurs in the early 19th century. They had met during the 1830s in St Martin's Church under the leadership of William Sudlow, a stockbroker and organist; their main interest was choral music. The Liverpool Philharmonic Society was established on 10 January 1840 with the object of promoting "the Science and Practice of Music"; its orchestra consisted largely of amateur players. The society was the second of its kind to be established, the first being the London-based Royal Philharmonic Society whose orchestra was disbanded in 1932.

The organisation was founded for the rich and élite members of Liverpool society, for "the pleasure of the moneyed merchant class in the town". Its first concert was given on 12 March 1840 in a room at the back of a dance academy in Great Richmond Street and was conducted by John Russell with William Sudlow as organist. The programme consisted of 13 short orchestral and choral pieces, including works by Auber, Rossini, Spohr, Henry Bishop, and George Onslow, and madrigals by Thomas Morley and John Wilbye. The society outgrew this room and gave its performances in the hall of the Collegiate Institution in Shaw Street. In 1843 the society appointed its first principal conductor, the Swiss-born J. Zeugheer Herrmann, who continued in this role until his death in 1865. During the following year, the orchestra performed its first symphonies, Haydn's No. 99 and Beethoven's First.

Interior of the first Philharmonic Hall, 1849

In 1844 the society appointed the Liverpool architect John Cunningham to prepare plans for a concert hall to be situated at the junction of Hope Street and Myrtle Street. It was to contain an audience of 2,100 and an orchestra of 250. To raise money for its building, shares were issued and members of Liverpool society were invited to buy seats in the boxes to be included in the hall. The foundation stone was laid in 1846 and construction began the following year. In 1847 the society invited Felix Mendelssohn to compose a cantata based on words from Milton's Comus to celebrate the opening of the hall. Mendelssohn died before this could be carried out. The hall cost £30,000 (£3.3 million as of 2025) and was formally opened on 27 August 1849. The first concert was performed by an orchestra of 96 and a choir of over 200; performers at the concert included three future conductors of the orchestra, Alfred Mellon, Julius Benedict and Charles Hallé. The organist was W. T. Best. The hall was not full for the first performance; this was attributed to two factors, the high price of admission, and the fear that the building, without central supporting pillars, was unsafe.

Problems soon arose. In 1850 the choir formed the Liverpool Philharmonic Auxiliary Society and were in conflict with their conductor. Herrmann offered his resignation, which was not accepted. By 1852 the financial problems of the society were deteriorating. Membership was exclusive and not all the seats on offer had been taken up. Suggestions that the conditions for membership should be relaxed were refused. In 1852 the society widened its activities from music by arranging theatrical performances, including Charles Dickens's company and an appearance by William Makepeace Thackeray. In 1855 it was discovered that William Sudlow, the Honorary Secretary had been stealing money from the society; an amount of more than £2,424 (£230,000 as of 2025) had been embezzled. Sudlow resigned from the society. He was replaced by a paid secretary; the post was given to Henry Sudlow, a distant relative of William. Henry was to serve the society for some 30 years with no similar problem. Prominent performers appearing for the society in 1856 were Jenny Lind, Clara Schumann and Charles Hallé. Dickens returned in 1858 and during that year the society was able to pay off the mortgage on the hall.

Liverpool Philharmonic conductors, 1867–1913: clockwise from top left: Benedict, Bruch, Hallé and Cowen

By 1865 Hermann's health was deteriorating and a new principal conductor, Alfred Mellon, was appointed in September. Mellon died only 18 months later, and was replaced by Julius Benedict, who remained in post until 1880, when his eyesight was deteriorating. While Benedict was principal conductor, the society flourished both artistically and financially. This did not continue during the tenure of the next principal conductor, despite his later fame. Max Bruch was appointed on 23 February 1880 and served for less than three years. During this time he experienced conflict with the committee of the society and complained about the behaviour of the audience. He resigned in January 1883 at which time the standards of the orchestra and the choir had deteriorated, and members of the committee were disagreeing with each other. The person appointed to sort this out was Charles Hallé who had by this time established the Hallé Orchestra in Manchester. Hallé continued as principal conductor until his death in 1895. During this time the orchestra and choir flourished. Those who appeared with the society during this time included Paderewski, Hubert Parry, Nellie Melba, and Clara Butt. In 1883 the secretary, Henry Sudlow, died; he was replaced by George Broadbent.

=== 1900–1939 ===
The next principal conductor was Frederic Cowen who remained in post until 1913. During this time more Romantic music was played, including works by Elgar, and this was not always popular with the audiences. Although the society continued to be exclusive, there was criticism about the behaviour of its members during concerts. Performers who appeared during this time were Fritz Kreisler, and Rachmaninoff, the latter playing his Third Piano Concerto and conducting other works at a concert in 1911. After the resignation of Frederic Cowen, the society did not appoint another principal conductor until 1942.

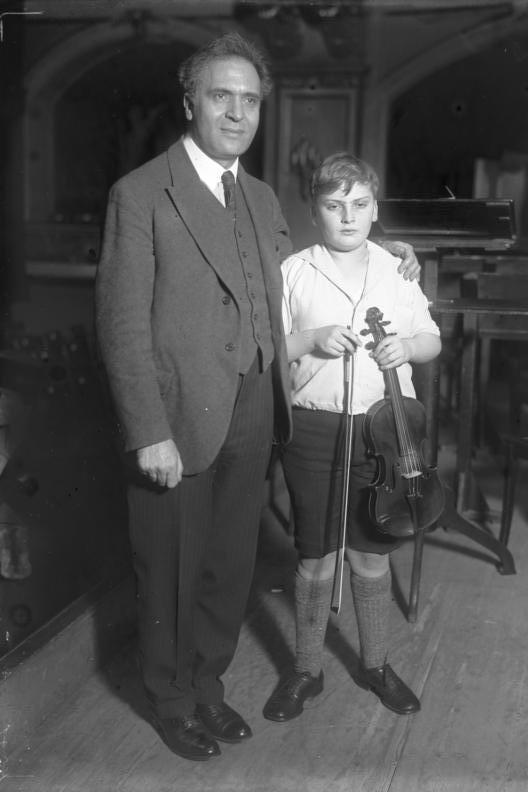
Bruno Walter and the teenage prodigy Yehudi Menuhin, 1931

During this period the orchestra was conducted by a series of guest conductors, who included Wilhelm Furtwängler, George Szell, Pierre Monteux, Serge Koussevitzky, and Bruno Walter. Soloists included Pablo Casals, John McCormack, Elisabeth Schumann, Yehudi Menuhin (his first appearance was at the age of 15), Solomon, Benno Moiseiwitsch, and Maggie Teyte. The British conductors to have a major influence on the orchestra during this time were Sir Henry Wood and Sir Thomas Beecham. During the early 1930s there was concern about the deteriorating financial situation of the society. There was a problem in filling seats and it was suggested that the rule of wearing evening dress at concerts should be relaxed; this was turned down.

Disaster struck the society on 5 July 1933 when the Philharmonic Hall was destroyed by fire. Concerts were mainly held in the Central Hall until a new hall could be built; larger scale works were performed in St George's Hall. Considerable discussion took place about the financing and the design of the new hall. It was decided that the society would pay for it without help from the City Corporation. Herbert J. Rowse was appointed as architect and he designed to hall in art deco style; it cost a little over £120,000 (£6.78 million as of 2025). Sir Thomas Beecham conducted the opening concert on 20 June 1939. Incorporated in the hall is an organ built by Rushworth and Dreaper, the pipework being hidden behind decorative grilles either side of the orchestra platform. The organ console rises from beneath, and was originally built on a turntable, allowing the organist to face the audience and conductor, or the choir. The console is now fitted with wheels and can be played anywhere on the platform. A Walturdaw rising cinema screen is also housed under the platform, the last such screen in the world still in working order.

=== Second World War ===
After the outbreak of the Second World War there was pressure to suspend the orchestra's concerts. The chairman of the management committee, David Webster, strongly resisted it, insisting that music was an essential morale-booster. He set up low-priced concerts for factory workers and members of the armed forces. The pre-war rule insisting that audiences wear formal evening dress was abolished. Webster recruited Malcolm Sargent as chief conductor; though not generally loved by orchestral players Sargent was immensely popular with the paying public. Guest conductors included Sir Henry Wood and Charles Münch.

Wartime disbanding of other orchestras - most notably that of the all-star BBC Salon Orchestra on 11 July 1942 after a month's notice - enabled Webster and Sargent to recruit leading players such as Anthony Pini and Reginald Kell, with the result that for a few years the Liverpool Philharmonic had a strong claim to be the finest orchestra in the country. During Webster's period as chairman, the orchestra increased its concerts from 32 a year to 148 and, in 1942, became a permanent body for the first time. Until then the Philharmonic was not a permanent ensemble, but comprised a nucleus of local players augmented from a pool of musicians who also played for the Hallé and latterly BBC Northern Orchestra. During the autumn and winter months the orchestra gave no more than one concert in a fortnight. The Hallé, which operated on a similar ad hoc basis, followed Liverpool's example the following year and became a permanent ensemble for the first time, under John Barbirolli.

The financial situation of the society improved in 1942 when the local authority, Liverpool City Corporation, bought the freehold of the hall for £35,000; the corporation undertook to pay the society an annuity of £4,000 and to allow it free use of the hall provided that it gave an agreed number of concerts each year, and maintained a permanent orchestra. The society agreed to promote musical education in and around Liverpool. In Sargent's first season, the orchestra made its first recording, its first broadcast, and gave its first school children's concert. Under him there was a "spectacular explosion" in the number of concerts and recording sessions performed. In 1944 the orchestra made its first appearance in London, performing at the Royal Albert Hall. The Times commented, "If Liverpool felt any qualms about letting its orchestra, accustomed as it is to the perfect acoustics of its own hall, try its fortunes in the rough and tumble of the Albert Hall, they will have been silenced, for what was immediately apparent was … an ensemble and congruity of tone-colouring that London in its less fortunate conditions can only envy". Sargent and the orchestra gave the British premieres of Tippett's First Symphony, and Bartók's Concerto for Orchestra and, in October 1946, the concert première of Britten's The Young Person's Guide to the Orchestra. Guest conductors in the immediate postwar years included Beecham, Sir Adrian Boult, the young Charles Groves, and Karl Rankl, who made so good an impression that he was appointed musical director of the Covent Garden Opera Company.

=== Late 1940s–1960s ===
In 1948 Sargent resigned as principal conductor. On 2 October 1949 Yehudi Menuhin and the Liverpool Philharmonic (conducted by Sargent) played at Belle Vue, Manchester. Sargent's successor, Hugo Rignold, initially had a difficult time, partly because of his background as a jazz and dance band player. However, he served in the post for six years and left in 1954 with an enhanced reputation. From 1955 the society had joint principal conductors, John Pritchard and Efrem Kurtz. The latter resigned in 1957 and Pritchard continued as sole principal conductor until 1963. In August 1956, the orchestra, conducted by Basil Cameron, made its Prom debut with an all Beethoven programme, consisting of the Fidelio overture, the violin concerto with Campoli as soloist, and Symphony No.5.

In 1957 the society and orchestra were granted "Royal" status and were authorised to include this word in their title. The following year the queen became the patron of the orchestra. In 1958 the society instigated a competition for young conductors. The first winner was Zubin Mehta. Under Pritchard's successor the competition became a seminar for young conductors, in which participants included Andrew Davis, Mark Elder, John Eliot Gardiner, James Judd and Barry Wordsworth. Pritchard was a champion of contemporary music and with the help of David Lloyd-Jones he introduced a series of concerts known as Musica Viva showcasing new compositions. During Pritchard's time, the society commissioned Walton to write his Second Symphony, which received its première at the Edinburgh Festival in 1960. Pritchard was succeeded by Charles Groves, who served as principal conductor for 14 years until he resigned in 1977. Groves helped to maintain the high standards of the orchestra and also encouraged the work of modern composers. He was the first English conductor to direct a full cycle of Mahler's symphonies. The orchestra undertook its first overseas tour in 1966, playing in Germany and Switzerland. In 1968 Groves conducted a performance of Messiaen's Turangalîla Symphony, in the presence of the composer, with Messiaen's wife, Yvonne Loriod, playing the concertante piano part.

=== 1970s–present day ===
After Groves's fourteen-year tenure as principal conductor, each of his three successors remained in post for much shorter periods; Walter Weller from 1977 to 1980, David Atherton from 1980 to 1983 and Marek Janowski from 1983 to 1987. In 1983 Edward Cowie was made Composer in Residence, the first such appointment to a major British orchestra. Musically the society was also entering a period of greater security with the appointment in 1987 of Libor Pešek as principal conductor. Pešek remained in post for ten years and during this time the standards and popularity of the orchestra improved. In Pešek's first season, the director of the society, Stephen Gray, retired after 23 years in the post. The occasion was marked by a concert at which Groves, Weller, Atherton, Janowski, Pešek and a former associate conductor, Simon Rattle, all conducted. In 1990 Royal Liverpool Philharmonic celebrated the 150th anniversary of its foundation. In the 1990–91 season, among the works performed that were new to the society was Paul McCartney's Liverpool Oratorio, conducted in Liverpool Cathedral by Carl Davis. In 1992, a rear extension was added to the hall. During the following year, while on tour, the orchestra was the first non-Czech orchestra to perform the opening concert in the Prague Spring Festival.

The hall was refurbished in 1995 at a cost of £10.3 million; during this time concerts were performed in Liverpool Cathedral. As part of this refurbishment, the curving interior, which had originally been constructed in fibrous plaster, was replaced with concrete. In 1997, Libor Pešek stood down as principal conductor and was given the title of conductor laureate. Petr Altrichter was the next chief conductor, from 1997 to 2001. Gerard Schwarz succeeded Altrichter, from 2001 to 2006. In 2006, Vasily Petrenko became chief conductor, at age 29 the youngest conductor to have held the post. Also in 2006 the society entered into a sponsorship agreement with the radio music station Classic FM. It was the station's first arts partner and the orchestra was given the title of the Classic FM Orchestra in North West England. As a result of this partnership, concerts of more "popular and accessible" pieces from the classical repertoire are played, and the radio station broadcasts some of these concerts. By the start of 2008, the station had broadcast 25 concerts, and the contract for the partnership has been extended to 2012. In 2008 Liverpool was a European Capital of Culture and the society played a major role in the events performed as part of this celebration. In 2009, Petrenko's title was changed from principal conductor to chief conductor, and he extended his contract with the Royal Liverpool Philharmonic Orchestra until 2015. In July 2018, the Royal Liverpool Philharmonic Orchestra announced that Petrenko would conclude his chief conductorship at the close of the 2020–2021 season, and then become the orchestra's conductor laureate.

In June 2019, Domingo Hindoyan first guest-conducted the Royal Liverpool Philharmonic Orchestra. In June 2020, the Royal Liverpool Philharmonic Orchestra announced the appointment of Hindoyan as its next chief conductor, effective with the 2021–2022 season. In July 2023, the RLPO announced the extension of Hindoyan's contract as chief conductor through July 2028.

== Associated organisations ==
=== Royal Liverpool Philharmonic Choir ===
A choir has been an integral part of Liverpool Philharmonic since its foundation. Originally called the Liverpool Philharmonic Choir, the name "Royal" was added to its title in 1990. Its longest serving chorus master was Dr J. E. Wallace who held this position from 1929 to 1970, apart from a break during the Second World War.

=== Liverpool Philharmonic Youth Company ===
Liverpool Philharmonic Youth Company works with young musicians of varying levels of expertise from across the Liverpool City Region. The Youth Company comprises four ensembles: Liverpool Philharmonic Youth Orchestra, Liverpool Philharmonic Youth Academy Orchestra, Liverpool Philharmonic Youth Session Orchestra, and Liverpool Philharmonic Brass Band. The Youth Company also includes four choirs: Liverpool Philharmonic Youth Choir, Liverpool Philharmonic Cambiata Choir, Liverpool Philharmonic Children's Choir and Liverpool Philharmonic Melody Makers.

The organisation's Youth Orchestra was founded as the Merseyside Youth Orchestra in 1951. Its conductor for the first 22 years of its existence was William Jenkins. Since 2014 its principal conductor has been Simon Emery, director of music at the local Liverpool Blue Coat School. The first work to be performed by the orchestra was the overture to Mozart's The Magic Flute. The orchestra changed its name to the present one in 2006. Its patron is Sir Simon Rattle, who was a percussionist in the orchestra from 1965 to 1972.

=== Ensemble 10:10 ===
This group was formed in 1997 by two members of the orchestra, principal clarinettist Nick Cox and associate principal cello Hilary Browning, to address a gap in programming by performing works of contemporary music and was initially run by the players themselves, receiving funding from the north-west arts board. It was later taken over by the society and has since been conducted by Clark Rundell, and has performed a large number of world premières.

== Projects ==
=== Learning Programme ===
Royal Liverpool Philharmonic has been organising events aimed towards schools and the community since the 1940s, when Sargent introduced concerts for schools. These concerts still exist today, with the organisation hosting a series of 13 Schools’ Concerts every year which are attended by around 18000 young people from across the region.

In 2003 the society a project known as Music for Life was launched to work with people in the most deprived areas in the city, working with primary schools and their communities. The project includes providing instruments and supporting a children's orchestra and a community choir. Liverpool Philharmonic established In Harmony Liverpool in 2009 – a learning programme which uses orchestral music-making to improve the life chances of children in North Liverpool. Participants take part in ensembles and music lessons which aim to increase their confidence, wellbeing and skills, and offer opportunities to travel, learn, perform and collaborate with professional musicians, international artists and other young people.

Liverpool Philharmonic was previously the principal Higher Education Partner with Liverpool Hope University, supplying members of the orchestra to teach in their music department, and arranging workshops and masterclasses. Students from the Royal Northern College of Music are invited to gain experience by rehearsing and playing with the orchestra and with Ensemble 10:10. Liverpool Philharmonic is also part of the Liverpool Arts Regeneration Consortium.

Liverpool Philharmonic runs a Classical Music Industry MA in partnership with the University of Liverpool for those keen to progress their career in the classical music industry, or enter or develop a career in arts management.

Liverpool Philharmonic established the Royal Liverpool Philharmonic Orchestra Emerging Musicians Fellowship in 2021. Run annually, the programme immerses four emerging orchestral musicians in the daily life of a professional orchestra, giving them the opportunity to rehearse, perform, train and carry out education programmes alongside the musicians of the Royal Liverpool Philharmonic Orchestra.

In 2015, Liverpool Philharmonic established the Christopher Brooks Prize, now known as the Rushworth Composition Prize, which offers an early-career composer of original music the opportunity to work alongside Liverpool Philharmonic. The prize winner takes part in workshops and masterclasses with composers, performers, conductors and other industry professionals associated with Liverpool Philharmonic, and is commissioned to write a new work to be performed by Ensemble 10:10.

=== Health ===
Since 2008, Liverpool Philharmonic has delivered its Music and Mental Health programme. Encouraging self-expression and skills development, the programme offers anyone experiencing mental ill-health in the local area the opportunity to access and benefit from music to aid their recovery and wellbeing.

Working alongside Mersey Care NHS Foundation Trust, other NHS partners and mental health charities, the programme has supported over 14,000 service users and their families across a variety of inpatient and community settings since its inception.

The programme sees musicians from the Royal Liverpool Philharmonic Orchestra working with participants across a range of workshops and concerts, including music-making, composition and song writing, improvisation, participant-led group performances, Dementia Friendly and Relaxed concerts, and adult learning opportunities.

== Recordings ==
The orchestra society made its earliest recordings before WWII with Moiseiwitsch performing Rachmaninov's Piano Concerto No 2 (1937 with Walter Goehr) and Paganini Variations (1938, Basil Cameron) Among the early efforts were in 1943, Walton's Belshazzar's Feast, and the Arthur Bliss's Piano Concerto in B-flat, with Solomon as soloist, and conducted by Boult.

In 1998 the orchestra became the first in Britain to own and run its own record label, known as 'RLPO Live'. This was a company created by the members of the orchestra, using the technical expertise of its own members to create recordings of live performances, with the performers, conductor and soloists being equal shareholders. As a recording orchestra the Royal Liverpool Philharmonic Orchestra has a varied and critically acclaimed discography throughout the era of recording, the famous Handel Messiah, Mendelsohn Elijah and Elgar Dream of Gerontius early LPs with Sargent and notable first recordings of British works, e.g. Frederick Delius and Arthur Bliss with Groves and Handley, both of whom have left an extensive British recorded repertoire with the orchestra. In particular, and more recently, Libor Pešek made a number of award-winning recordings with the Royal Liverpool Philharmonic Orchestra of Czech composers, including symphonies and orchestral music of Antonín Dvořák and Josef Suk. The Royal Liverpool Philharmonic Orchestra's catalogue also includes a complete symphony cycle and other works by Beethoven with Sir Charles Mackerras, Britten, Mahler symphonies with Schwarz, Pešek and Mackerras, as well as many works of Rachmaninov, Smetana and Richard Strauss with those conductors. A full Vaughan Williams symphony cycle and other works with Vernon Handley was also made, several of them receiving 'Best Recording in Category' of The Gramophone magazine's recommendations. Many of these recordings feature the Royal Liverpool Philharmonic Choir. A complete cycle of all six symphonies by the Danish composer Carl Nielsen, in a new edition, has been released by the Royal Liverpool Philharmonic Orchestra and Douglas Bostock. Petrenko has recorded the complete Shostakovich symphonies. His recording of Tchaikovsky's Manfred Symphony and The Voyevoda was Awarded Best Orchestral in the Gramophone Award 2009. and the Shostakovich Symphony No 10 received the same award in 2011. Petrenko has also recorded the Rachmaninov Symphonies and Piano Concertos with Simon Trpčeski and in 2017 completed a Tchaikovsky symphonies cycle achieving the 'Record of the Year 2017' award for the performance of the 1st, 2nd and 5th from 'BBC Music Magazine'. The British repertoire is continuing, notably an Alwyn symphony cycle and orchestral works under David Lloyd-Jones; also Petrenko took the Elgar Symphonies and orchestral works and Andrew Manze's new Vaughan Williams cycle completed both series in 2019.

Much of this recording legacy is due to the availability of the Hall for recording and rehearsal purposes and is now supplemented by The Friary, rehearsal studio, which is the venue for the outreach programme 'In Harmony' in the West Everton district of the city.

== Honours and awards ==
In 1989 the society and orchestra received an honorary fellowship from Liverpool John Moores University and in 1991 they became one of the first organisations to be awarded the Freedom of the City of Liverpool. The City of Liverpool granted them an honour of Meritorious Service in 1997. In the Classic FM Gramophone Awards 2007, Vasily Petrenko was named Young Artist of the Year. In 2009 the orchestra and Ensemble 10/10 were joint winners of the title Ensemble of the Year in the Royal Philharmonic Society Music Awards, with Ensemble 10/10 being the winners in the Concert Series of the Year category. The hall won the title of the Best Performing Venue in The Mersey Partnership Annual Tourism Awards in both 2006 and 2009.

== Present day ==
Each year the society organises more than 60 concerts of classical music played by the orchestra. It arranges other events in the hall, including performances of pop, rock, folk and jazz music and comedy shows. Films are shown on the Walturdaw screen (which rises from the stage on a counterbalance system), accompanied by Dave Nicholas, the resident cinema organist, prior to the screenings.

The society also arranges concerts in the Concert Room of St George's Hall. The orchestra tours to other towns and cities in the UK and abroad. In March 2010 it toured in Switzerland. The hall can be hired for corporate or private events. The orchestra rehearses and makes recordings at the Liverpool Philharmonic at the Friary.
