= Re Yenidje Tobacco Co Ltd =

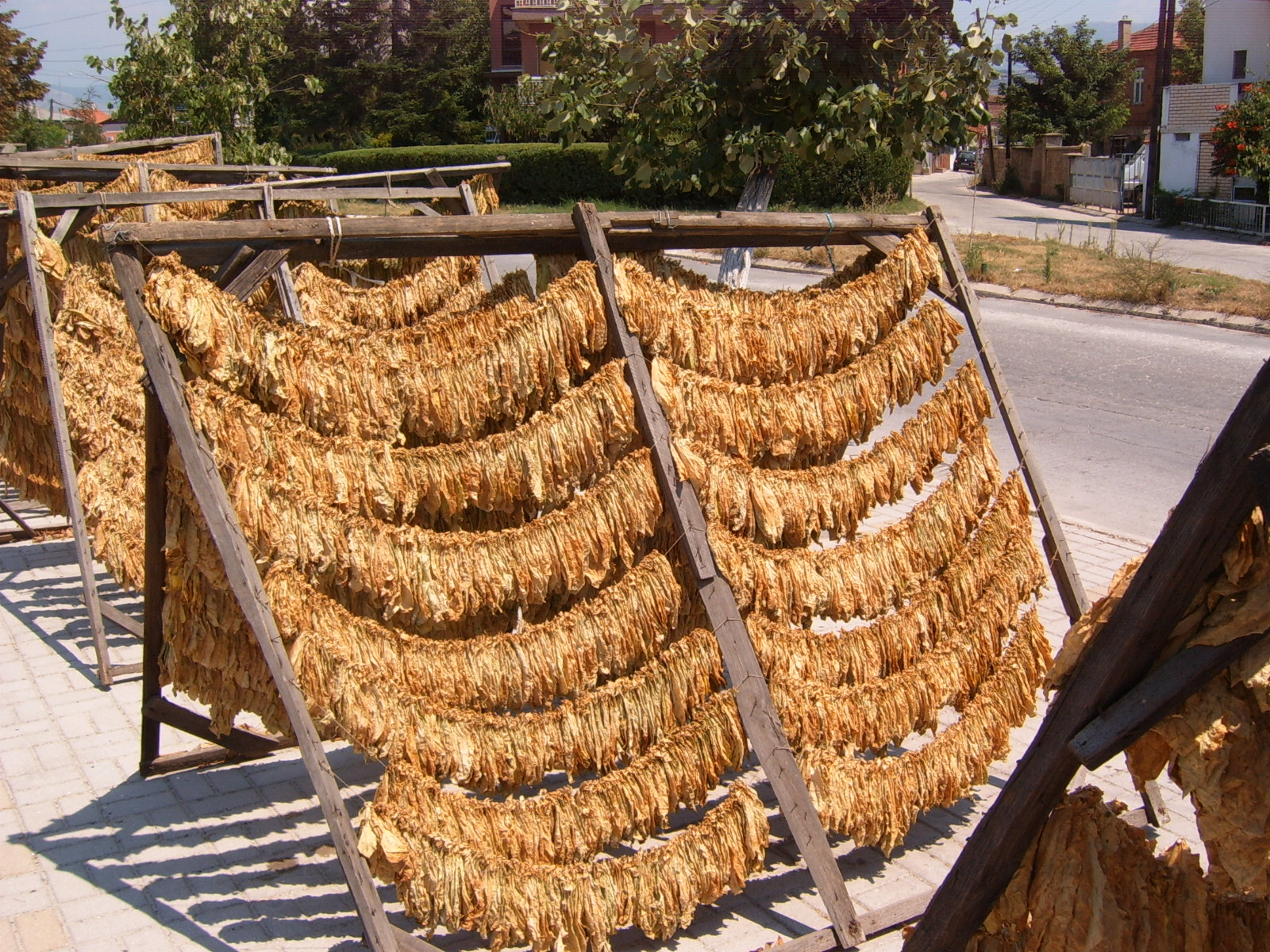
- Court: Court of Appeal
- Citation: [1916] 2 Ch 426

Court membership
- Judges sitting: Lord Cozens-Hardy MR, Pickford LJ and Warrington LJ

Keywords
- Just and equitable winding up

Re Yenidje Tobacco Co Ltd [1916] 2 Ch 426 is a UK company law and UK insolvency law case concerning just and equitable winding up.

== Facts ==
Yenidje Tobacco Company Limited had two shareholders with equal shares and each were directors. They could not agree how the company could be managed. There was no provision for breaking the deadlock.

== Judgment ==
The Court of Appeal held the company could be wound up as just and equitable under the Companies (Consolidation) Act 1908 section 129 (now Insolvency Act 1986, section 122(1)(g)) as the only way to break the deadlock. Lord Cozens-Hardy MR said the following.

Is it possible to say that it is not just and equitable that that state of things should not be allowed to continue, and that the Court should not, intervene and say this is not what the parties contemplated by the arrangement into which they entered? They assumed, and it is the foundation of the whole of the agreement that was made, that the two would act as reasonable men with reasonable courtesy and reasonable conduct in every way towards each other, and arbitration was only to be resorted to with regard to some particular dispute between the directors which could not be determined in any other way. Certainly, having regard to the fact that the only two directors will not speak to each other, and no business which deserves the name of business in the affairs of the company call be carried on, I think the company should not be allowed to continue. I have treated it as a partnership, and under the Partnership Act of course the application for a dissolution would take the form of an action; but this is not a partnership strictly, it is not a case in which it can be dissolved by action. But ought not precisely the same principles to apply to a case like this where in substance it is a partnership in the form or the guise of a private company? It is a private company, and there is no way to put an end to the state of things which now exists except by means of a compulsory order. It has been urged upon us that, although it is admitted that the “just and equitable” clause is not to be limited to cases ejusdem generis, it has nevertheless been held, according to the authorities, not to apply except where the substratum of the company has gone or where there is a complete deadlock. Those are the two instances which are given, but I should be very sorry, so far as my individual opinion goes, to hold that they are strictly the limits of the “just and equitable” clause as found in the Companies Act. I think that in a case like this we are bound to say that circumstances which would justify the winding up of a partnership between these two by action are circumstances which should induce the Court to exercise its jurisdiction under the just and equitable clause and to wind up the company.

== See also ==
- UK company law
