= Reutemann =

Reutemann is a surname. Notable people with the surname include:

- Carlos Reutemann (1942–2021), Argentine racing driver
- Mariano Reutemann (born 1977), Argentine windsurfer
