= The Football Yearbook =

Annual British football reference book

- Original title: Rothmans Football Yearbook
- Language: English
- Genre: Almanac
- Publisher: Headline
- No. of books: 56

The Football Yearbook (formerly Rothmans Football Yearbook and Sky Sports Football Yearbook) is a British football reference book published annually by Headline (a division of Hodder Headline). It was first published in 1970 for the 1970–71 season, its first compilers being Tony Williams and Roy Peskett. For many years the editors were father and daughter Jack and Glenda Rollin. The Rollins' involvement ended with the 2012–13 edition, with the parting somewhat acrimonious.

The book contains statistical information on the previous season in English football, including all results, appearances, goalscorers and transfers for the Premier League, Football League, Conference National, Scottish Premier League and Scottish Football League, as well as selected historical records for each club and all major competitions. It also contains less detailed information on football in Wales and Northern Ireland, non-League football and women's football in England, European nations' national league tables and international competitions.

It was sponsored by the tobacco company Rothmans from its inception until the 2002–03 edition, after which they withdrew because of pending UK legislation restricting tobacco sponsorship in sport. Sky Sports took over as sponsors from the 2003–04 edition onwards.

In March 2018, it was reported that the future of the book was in doubt after Sky Sports withdrew their sponsorship, believed to be around £30,000 per year.

From the 2018–19 season, the book was sponsored by The Sun newspaper for two years. The sponsors until 2025-26 were Utilita Energy.. In November 2025, Headline announced that the new sponsor for the 2026-27 and 2027-28 editions was Factkeep Football
