= Louis Rothman =

British businessman

Louis Rothman (1869–1926) was the founder of Rothmans International, one of the United Kingdom's largest tobacco businesses.

== Career ==
Apprenticed at the age of fourteen to an uncle's tobacco factory near Kyiv in Ukraine, Louis Rothman emigrated to the United Kingdom with very little money in 1887.

He started to earn his living in London as a hand made cigarette maker and then used the money that he had saved to set up his own business selling cigarettes, which he rolled himself.

In 1893, he married Jane Weiner and at about the same time opened a small kiosk at 55a Fleet Street (reputed to have been the smallest shop in the City of London) from where he sold the cigarettes he had rolled the previous night.

'Among his customers were the Lords Rothermere and Northcliffe and Sir James Wilcox. The business of this little shop grew until, in a comparatively short time there were six Rothman shops in the city.' He subsequently opened a number of other shops in the City and in about 1902 rented a half shop in the West End of London (5a Pall Mall). This was marked by the launch of the Pall Mall brand of cigarettes. After the First World War had ended, he had to use the name Rothmans of Pall Mall to distinguish his business from a shop in Regent Street that had been started by his brother, Marx, and subsequently sold to someone else.

In 1912 or 1913, Louis merged his business with that of Markus Weinberg to form the Yenidje Tobacco Company Limited. As a result of a disagreement between the two owners, the arrangement was dissolved in 1916.

In 1919, Louis went into partnership with his son, Sydney. In 1922, they started to sell cigarettes by mail order through the Rothman's Direct-to-Smoker service. Overseas demand also expanded and taking advantage of incentives from the UK Government to promote the importing of tobacco from British Commonwealth countries, they expanded the business into an international concern.

A lifelong smoker, Louis Rothman died in 1926 of lung cancer.
