= Herzogspitalkirche =

Catholic church in Munich, Germany

Coordinates: 48°08′14″N 11°34′3″E

Herzogspitalkirche (German: "St. Elisabeth Hospital") is a Catholic church in Munich, southern Germany.

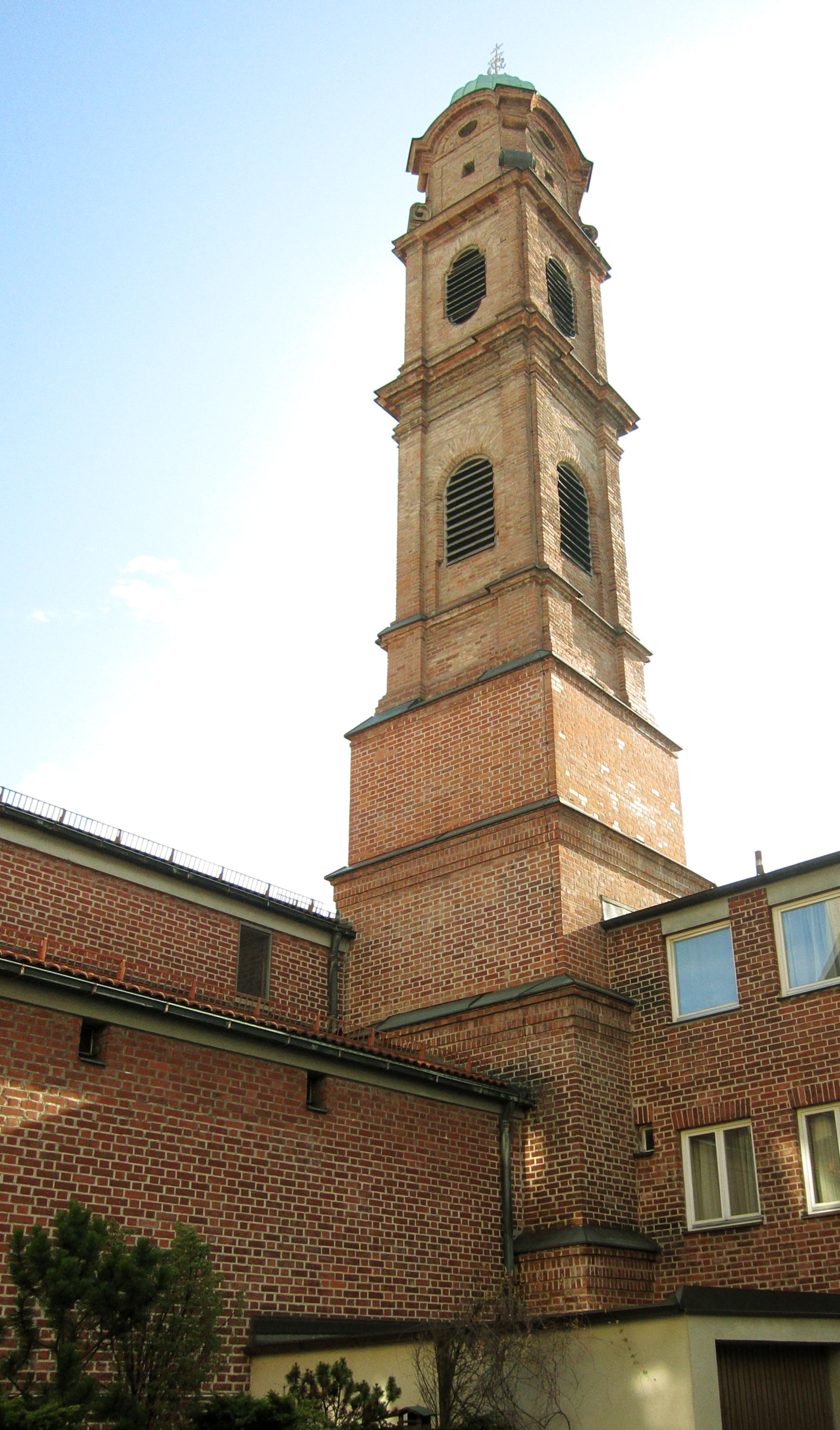
Spire of Herzogspitalkirche

It was a Baroque building commissioned by Duke Albert V of Bavaria, designed by Johann Baptist Gunetzrhainer and inaugurated in 1727.

Damaged during World War II, the Duke Hospital was demolished and replaced by a new building. The tower was restored, the nave replaced by a new building designed by Alexander von Branca (1956–57), with a brickwork interior.
