= Simon Rottmanner =

German writer, agrarian reformer, jurist, landowner and accountant

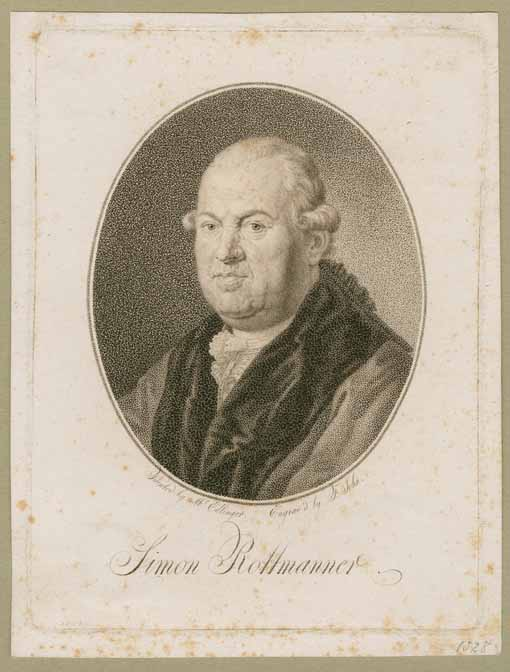
Simon Rottmanner

Simon Rottmanner (also known under the pseudonyms Theobald Fröhlich, Johann T. zu Schollenberg and Theophilus Neumann; 2 February 1740 – 6 September 1813) was a German writer, agrarian reformer, jurist, landowner and accountant. He was born in Rottmann-Hof near Erding and died in Ast.

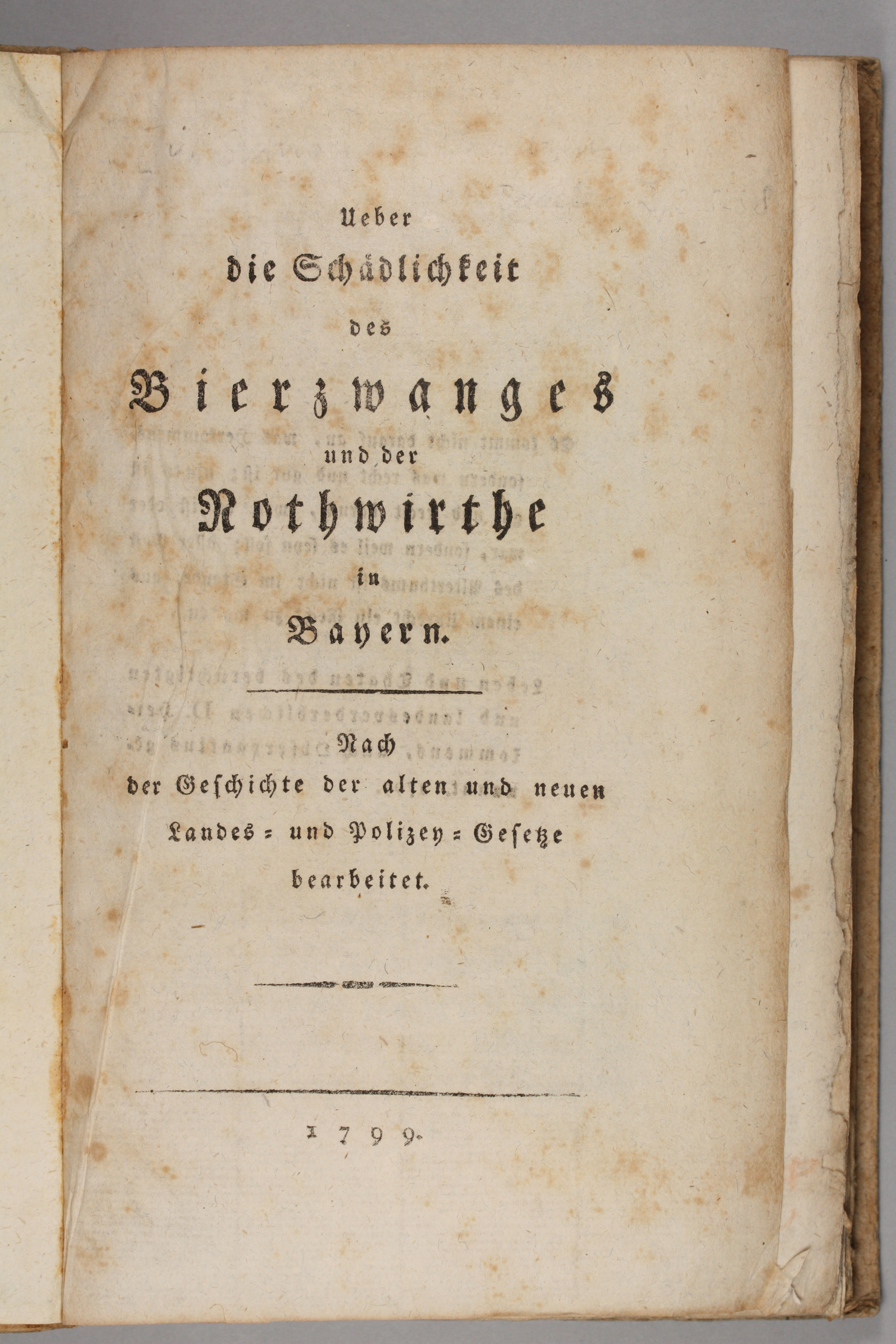
Ueber die Schädlichkeit des Bierzwanges und der Nothwirthe in Bayern, 1799

Among his works was an anonymously published discussion of Bavarian laws limiting home-brewing, and their economic and social effects, Ueber die Schädlichkeit des Bierzwanges und der Nothwirthe in Bayern (1799).

He was the father of the poet, philosopher, and politician Karl Rottmanner and the greatuncle of composer and organist Eduard Rottmanner.

== Bibliography ==
- Pius Wittmann: "Rottmanner, Simon", Allgemeine Deutsche Biographie
