= Marian E. Rottman =

American nurse

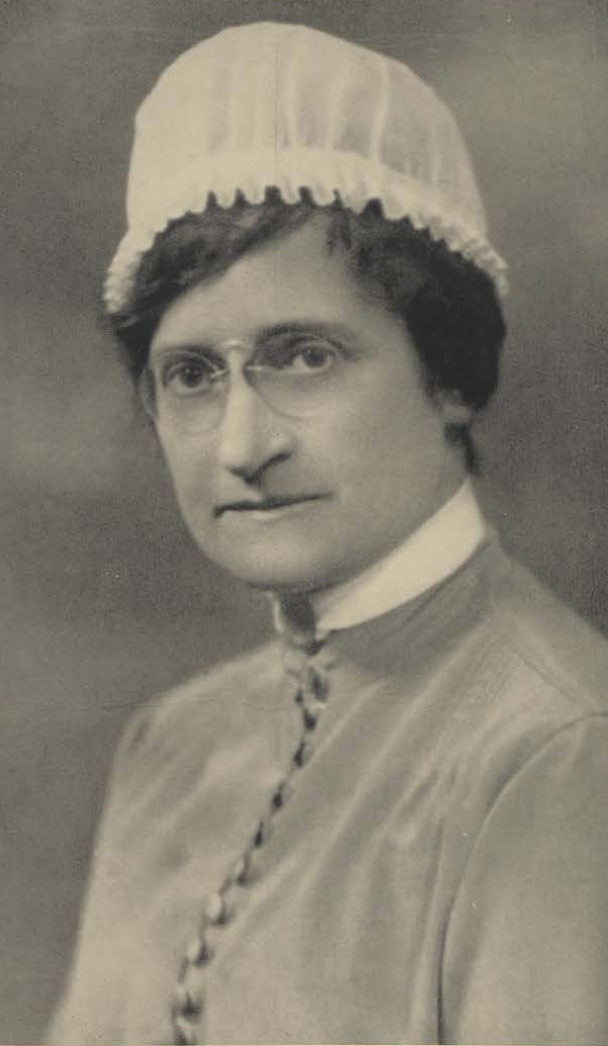
- Marian E. Rottman, from a 1928 yearbook
- Born: March 24, 1882; Sturgeon Bay, Wisconsin, U.S.
- Died: June 10, 1955 (age 73); Florida, U.S.
- Other name: Marian R. Fleming (after 1935)
- Occupation: Nurse
- Spouse: Mark Lance Fleming

Marian E. Rottman Fleming (March 24, 1882 – June 10, 1955) was an American nurse. She was director of nursing at Bellevue and Allied Hospitals in New York, and served overseas in World War I.

== Early life and education ==
Rottman was born in Sturgeon Bay, Wisconsin. She graduated from Bellevue School of Nursing in 1912. In the early 1920s she received further training in hospital administration at Teachers College, Columbia University.

== Career ==
Rottman was assistant to Clara Noyes after finishing her nurse's training. In 1913 she was named assistant supervisor of nurses at the Indiana University School of Nursing, but she returned to New York in 1914, to take charge of nursing in one of Bellevue's new surgical pavilions. She joined the Bellevue Unit to serve overseas in World War I, as chief surgical nurse at U. S. Evacuation Hospital No. 1. She was cited for meritorious service in the war by General John J. Pershing.

From 1919 to 1921, Rottman was superintendent of nursing at the Johnston Emergency Hospital in Milwaukee. She also worked at Milwaukee's Mount Sinai School of Nursing. In 1925, she returned to Bellevue as director of nursing. In 1929 she was named director of the nursing division in the Department of Hospitals for the City of New York, overseeing nursing services at 26 city hospitals and eight nursing schools.

Rottman was treasurer of the National League of Nursing Education from 1924 to 1934. She was president of the New York Counties Registered Nurses Association.

== Publications ==
- "High Caloric Feedings for Typhoid Patients" (1912)
- "A Health Study in a Nursing School" (1926, with Laura R. Logan)
- "Health Education in Schools of Nursing" (1928)
- "Distribution of Nursing Service in Hospitals" (1929)
- "Affiliations for Nursing Schools: From the Viewpoint of the Receiving Hospital" (1930)
- "The Role of the Nursing Service in the Promotion of the Medical and Administrative Aims of the Hospital" (1931)
- "Friends of Nursing: Mrs. William Church Osborn" (1932)
- Clinical Education in Nursing (1932, with Blanche Pfefferkorn)
- "Should a Hospital Close Its Nursing School? And Why?" (1932)

== Personal life ==
Rottman married hospital superintendent Mark Lance Fleming in 1935, and moved to Florida with him. Her husband died in 1947, and she died in 1955, in her early seventies, in Orlando, Florida. Both Flemings are buried in Arlington National Cemetery.
