= Rotman =

Rotman may refer to:

- Brian Rotman (1938–2026), British-American academic
- Dan Rotman (born 1932), American bridge player
- Jaime José Rotman, retired Argentine football goalkeeper
- Joseph Rotman (1935–2015), Canadian businessman and philanthropist
- Sergiu Dan (born Isidor Rotman, 1903–1976), Romanian writer
- Walter Rotman (1922–2007), American engineer and namesake of the Rotman lens

== Other uses ==
- Rotman School of Management, the University of Toronto's business school
- Rotman, Slovenia, a small settlement in northeastern Slovenia

== See also ==
- Roitman
- Rothmann
