= Karl Rottmanner =

Karl Borromäus Rottmanner (30 October 1783 – 8 July 1824) was a German poet, philosopher, and politician. Born in Munich, he was the son of lawyer and agricultural reformer Simon Rottmanner (1740-1813) and his wife Maria Anna Barbara Paur (1746–1828). His first cousin once removed was German composer and organist Eduard Rottmanner. He studied law at the Ludwig-Maximilians-Universität München where he earned a PhD. While a student there he belonged to a student patriotic movement led by Johann Nepomuk von Ringseis. After graduating, he became a member of the Landtag of Bavaria. He died in Ast.

== Works ==
- Kritik der Abhandlung Jacobis, 1808
- Frühlingsblumen, 1808
- Sammlung bayrischer Volkslieder, 1810
- Ferner Artikel für die "Zeitschrift für Wissenschaft und Kunst"
