= Sarasota Memorial Hospital =

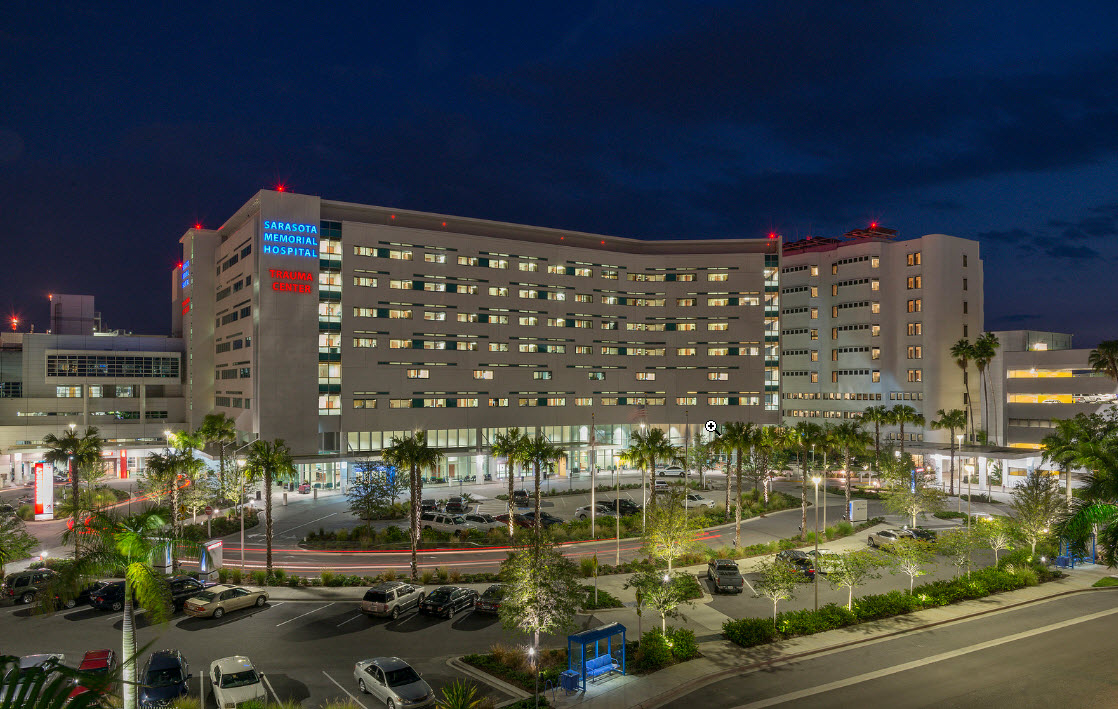
- Facility in 2017

Geography
- Location: 1700 South Tamiami Trail, Sarasota, Florida, United States
- Coordinates: 27°19′04″N 82°31′51″W

Organization
- Type: General
- Network: Sarasota Memorial Health Care System

Services
- Standards: Joint Commission
- Emergency department: Level II trauma center
- Beds: 897

History
- Founded: 1925

Links
- Website: www.smh.com
- Lists: Hospitals in Florida

Sarasota Memorial Hospital (SMH) is a publicly owned 901-bed health care facility located in Sarasota, Florida. It was founded in 1925. The health care facility is a level II trauma center and the flagship facility of the Sarasota Memorial Health Care System, which services Sarasota and Manatee counties. The hospital also serves as central hub for the system's urgent care centers and network of outpatient labs and offices.

== History ==
=== Early years (1921–1954) ===
Local residents started to raise funds for the hospital in 1921. Sarasota Hospital opened on November 2, 1925, with a capacity of 32 beds and simple canvas tents. In 1927, the facility was turned over to the city of Sarasota, and was renamed Sarasota Municipal Hospital. By the 1930s, the hospital had a capacity of 100 beds, an ambulance garage, nurses' home, and wing for patient overflow. The hospital continued to expand in the 1940s, with a surgical suite, kitchen and dining room, and an air-conditioned unit. The hospital was renamed in 1954 to its current name in honor of the veterans from World War I and World War II.

=== Growth and expansion (1955–1985) ===
The following decades were a period of development and expansion for the hospital, with a new south wing opening in 1955, bringing the hospital capacity up to 225 beds, and the Retter Wing opening in 1963, adding 92 more beds. In 1976, the East Tower was completed with a helipad, allowing for patients to be transported to and from the hospital via helicopter. In 1983, an open heart surgery center opened and the Waldemere Tower as well, bringing total bed count for the hospital to 825.

=== Recent history ===
Since November 2021, the SMH campus has been home to the Brian D. Jellison Cancer Institute.

That same month, SMH expanded with a second full hospital campus, opening Sarasota Memorial Hospital - Venice in the southern part of Sarasota County.

== Graduate medical education ==
Sarasota Memorial Hospital operates internal medicine and emergency medicine residency training programs, which are both affiliated with Florida State University.

== Reputation ==
In the 21st century, Sarasota Memorial Hospital has gained national recognition as both an institution and for particular specialties, including cancer care, cardiology, physical rehabilitation, urology, and orthopedic surgery.

In 2022, US News & World Report named Sarasota Memorial Hospital to its annual ranking of the Best Hospitals in the world for the fourth year in a row. That same year, SMH was also named to the Fortune/Merative rankings of the 100 Top Hospitals in the nation for the sixth time in the hospital's history. The same rankings named SMH one of the top three teaching hospitals in the state of Florida.

In 2023, Newsweek named Sarasota Memorial Hospital one of the "World's Best Hospitals" for the fifth year in a row.

Sarasota Memorial Hospital has received straight 'A's for patient safety from the Leapfrog Group since first participating in the evaluations in 2016.

== Notable staff ==
- Eric Minkin (1950-2025), American-Israeli registered nurse; formerly professional basketball player
