= Rothmans International =

Former British tobacco manufacturer

Rothmans International plc
- Type: Public limited company
- Industry: Tobacco
- Predecessor: Union Financiere Belge des Tabacs Tabacofina
- Founded: 1890 in London
- Founder: Louis Rothman
- Defunct: 1999; 27 years ago
- Fate: Acquired by British American Tobacco
- Successor: Rothmans, Benson & Hedges (Canada)
- Headquarters: London, England
- Key people: Lord Swaythling, Chairman; Lord Pritchard, Chairman
- Products: Cigarettes

Rothmans International PLC was a British tobacco manufacturer. Its brands included Rothmans, Player's and Dunhill, all of which are still sold (mainly by British American Tobacco). Its international headquarters were in Hill Street, Mayfair, London, and its international operations were run from Denham Place, Buckinghamshire.

The company was listed on the London Stock Exchange and was once a constituent of the FTSE 100 Index, but it was acquired by British American Tobacco in 1999. Its business was the strongest in Europe.

== History ==
The company was founded by Louis Rothman in 1890 as a small kiosk on Fleet Street in London. In 1900, Rothman opened a small showroom in Pall Mall, from where he launched his famous Pall Mall cigarette brand. His reputation was such that King Edward VII granted Rothmans a royal warrant in 1905. Rothmans was first listed on the London Stock Exchange in 1929.

In 1954, the Rembrandt Tobacco Company acquired a controlling interest in Rothmans. Rembrandt was expanding and in 1958 acquired Carreras, who in turn took a 51% stake in Alfred Dunhill in 1967.

In the 1970s, Rothmans became involved in sponsorships, sponsoring the British Olympic team in 1972 and the inaugural Hong Kong Sevens in 1976. They also sponsored Rothmans Football Yearbook, an annual football reference book, from 1970 until 2002.

In Malaysia, Rothmans was one of the popular brands of cigarette, so much so that one of the roundabouts in Petaling Jaya was named 'Rothmans Roundabout' owing to its proximity to the former headquarters of Rothmans of Pall Mall Malaysia (now British American Tobacco Malaysia). It has since converted to a 4-way junction.

In 1988, Lord Swaythling became chairman and chief executive.

In January 1996, the Rembrandt Group and Richemont merged their tobacco businesses under the "Rothmans International" name. Then, in 1999, Rothmans was acquired by British American Tobacco. The takeover resulted in the closure of the Rothmans Spennymoor and Darlington manufacturing plants in 2000 and 2001, respectively, with production moved to a larger plant at Southampton.

== Sponsorship ==
=== Motorsports ===
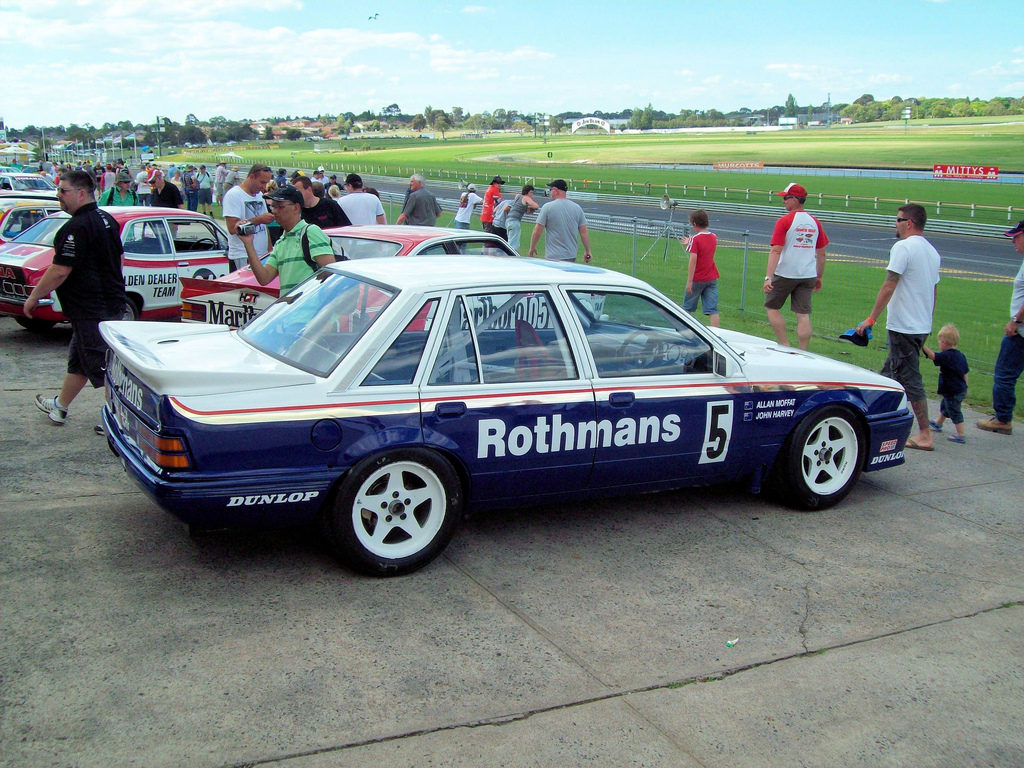
Holden VL Commodore SS Group A of Allan Moffat & John Harvey, winner of the 1987 Monza 500, on display at the Historic Sandown 2009

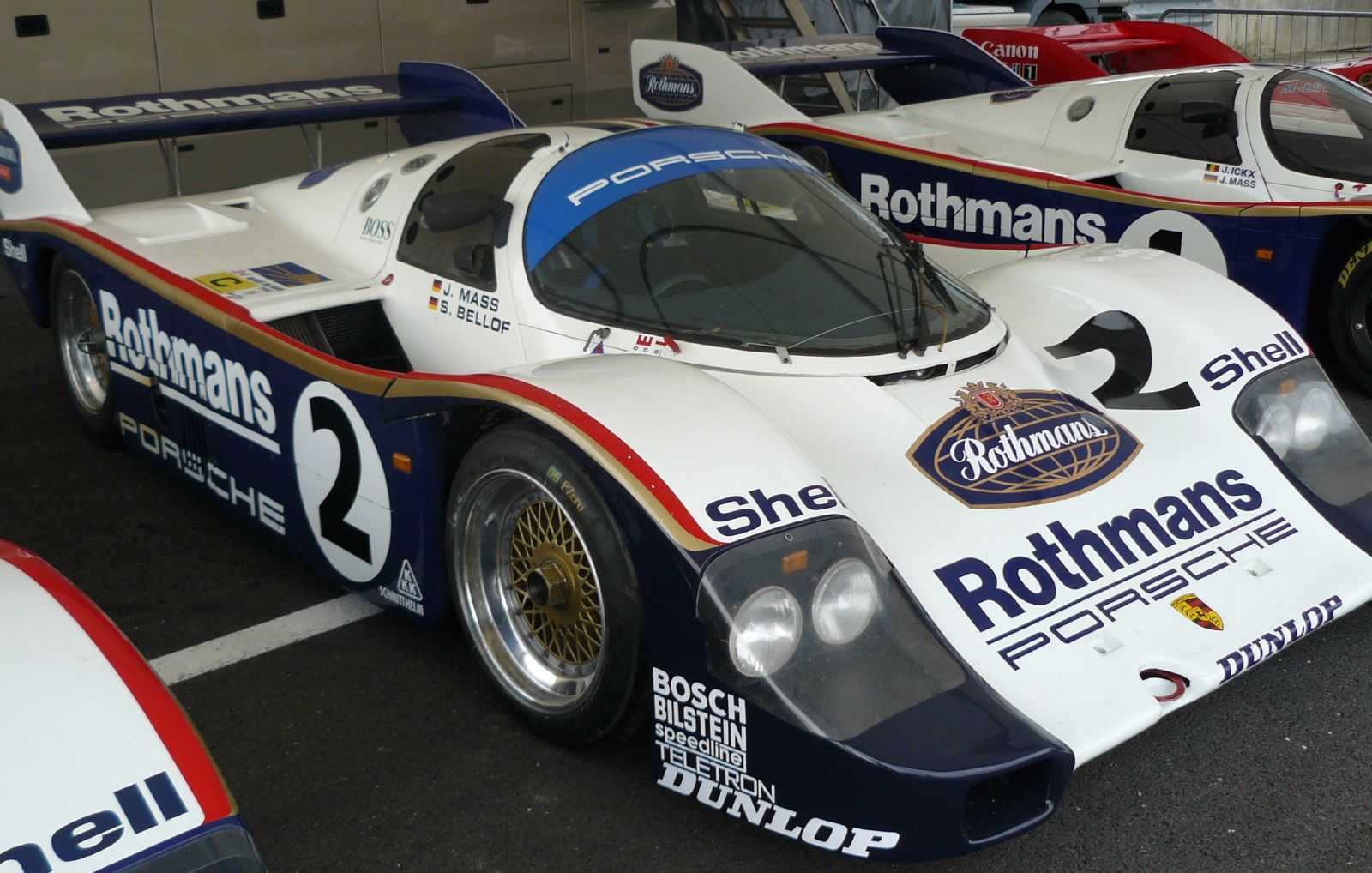
One of several Porsche 956s sponsored by Rothmans

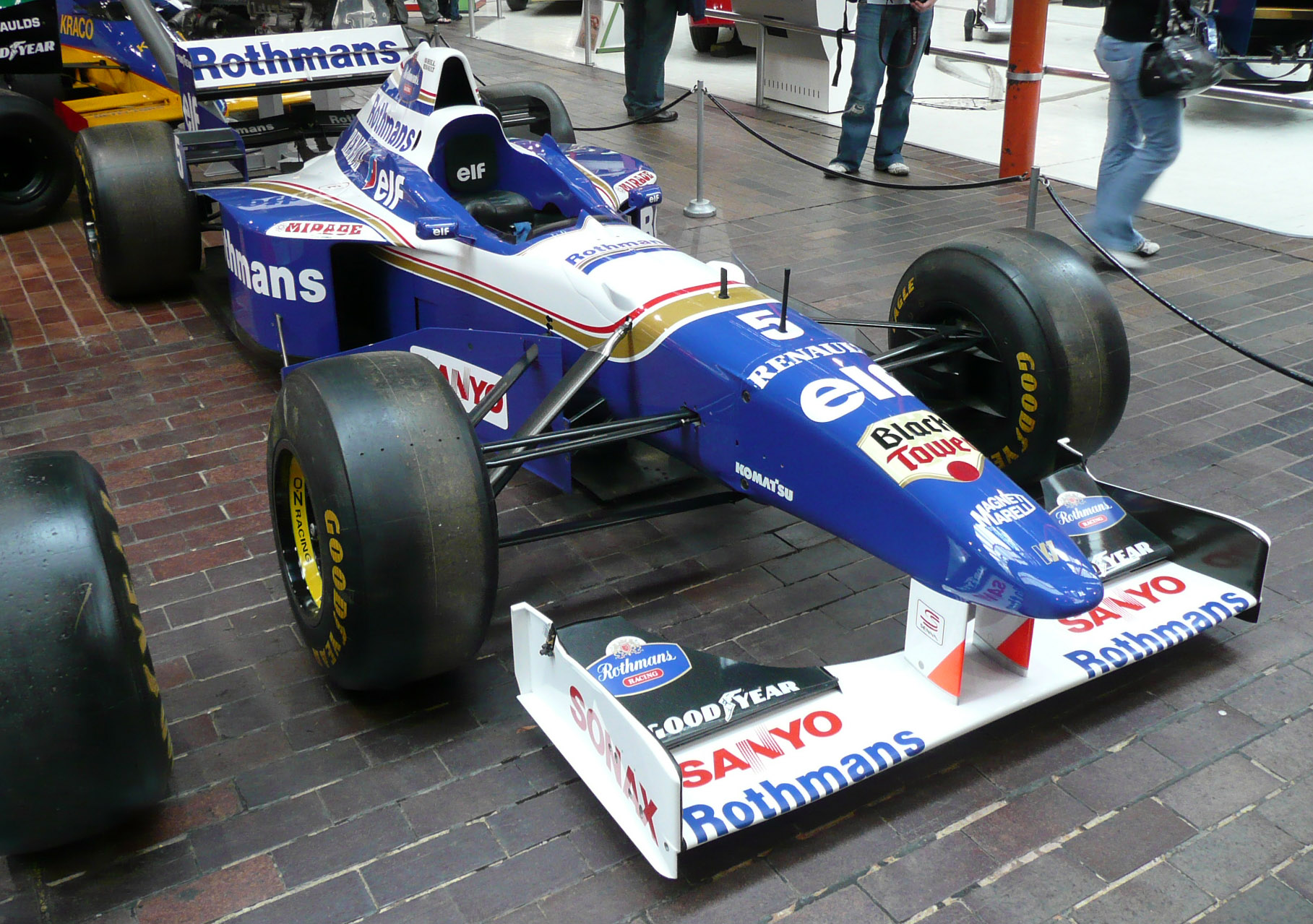
The Williams FW18 Formula One car sponsored by Rothmans

Rothmans was an active promoter of motorsports in the 1980s and 1990s.

==== Rallying ====
Rothmans sponsorship also extended to rallying program. It supported the David Sutton privateer team from 1979 to 1981, with Ari Vatanen winning the World Drivers' Championship in the final year aboard the Ford Escort RS1800. The company sponsored the Opel Rally Team in 1982 and 1983, where Walter Röhrl won the first season with the Opel Ascona 400.

In 1984, the brand began to sponsor Porsche's rallying, which developed the 911 SC RS in collaboration with the newly formed Prodrive, run by both Ian Parry and David Richards. Beny Fernández was runner-up at the Spanish Rally Championship in 1983, and Henri Toivonen was runner-up at the European rally Championship in 1984. Rothmans also sponsored the Porsche factory team at the Paris-Dakar Rally, with René Metge winning in 1984 and 1986.

Porsche has revived the 911 Dakar model introduced to their 2023 spring lineup being promoted as having roots in the Rothmans 911 and although it is all wheel drive and lifted, it carries the same colors and similar patterns the Rothmans car displayed along with the Rothmans moniker on the sides. That logo has been dropped in exchange for the logo “Roughroads” on the sides. A limited run of 2,500 cars are being made.

Porsche left rallying when the Group B category was dropped, and Rothmans transferred its association to the Subaru rally team, also run by Prodrive (Ian Parry and David Richards). The association with Prodrive would last until 1992, when their sponsorship was replaced by sister brand State Express 555. The brand also sponsored the World Rallying yearbook from 1978 to 1983.

==== Sports car racing ====
From 1982 onwards, Rothmans supported the factory Porsche sports car racing effort, winning the 1982 24 Hours of Le Mans with a 1-2-3 finish with their Porsche 956. They would win the event a further three times in the 1980s. Rothmans-Porsche also won the 1985 World Sportscar Championship before the team officially pulled out of the championship in 1987.

Rothmans were the title and founding partner of the Rothmans-Porsche Challenge Cup single-make Porsche 944 series founded by Jack Christie, which ran from 1986 to 1991.

==== Motorcycle racing ====
Between 1985 and 1993, Rothmans supported the works Honda team in Grand Prix motorcycle racing, with riders such as Freddie Spencer (1985 champion), Wayne Gardner (1987 champion), Eddie Lawson (1989 champion), Randy Mamola and Mick Doohan. The brand also sponsored the Honda trials team in 1986.

==== Formula One ====
Rothmans sponsored Williams-Renault during the Formula 1 World Championship from 1994 until 1997. However, their time with Williams was marred when Ayrton Senna, considered to be the greatest Formula 1 driver of all time, died behind the wheel of the Rothmans-Williams FW16 during the 1994 San Marino Grand Prix. Williams drivers Damon Hill and Jacques Villeneuve won the F1 title in 1996 and 1997, respectively, with the team also taking the Constructor's Championship both years. Sponsorship was transferred in 1998 to Winfield, another sister brand.

==== Touring car racing ====
In Australia, Rothmans was the naming rights sponsor for Australian team Allan Moffat Racing in the early rounds of the inaugural World Touring Car Championship in 1987 (the Moffat team had a long association with Rothmans who sponsored the team's Mazda RX-7s in the early-mid 1980s in Australian Touring car racing through their Peter Stuyvesant brand). Driving a V8 powered Holden VL Commodore SS Group A, team boss Allan Moffat and co-driver John Harvey won the first ever WTCC race, the 1987 Monza 500. The pair would later drive the Rothmans sponsored car to outright 4th place in the 1987 Spa 24 Hours.

=== Other sports ===
In association football, Rothmans sponsored The Football Yearbook from 1970 to 2002, and the Malta International Football Tournament from 1986 to 2004.

In tennis, it sponsored the Canadian Open from 1970 to 1978, the Rothmans International Tennis Tournament from 1970 to 1975, the South of England Championships from 1968 to 1973, and the Vancouver WCT from 1970 to 1973.

In horse racing, it sponsored he Rothmans 100,000 in Australia from 1980 to 1989, and the Canadian International Stakes from 1981 to 1995.

In snooker, the brand sponsored the Rothmans Grand Prix from 1984 to 1992, and the Snooker Yearbook from 1985 to 1991.

It also sponsored the Rothmans Medal rugby league award from 1968 to 1996, the Rugby Union Yearbook from 1972 to 1999, the Malaysian Masters golf tournament from 1989 to 1991.

== Products and brands ==
- Rothmans International
- Rothmans Biru
- Rothmans King Size Filter
- Benson & Hedges
- Black Cat
- Consulate Menthol (Note: Discontinued in 2020 in Europe)
- Craven A
- Dunhill
- Golden American
- John Player's Gold Leaf
- Kent
- Pall Mall
- Peter Stuyvesant
- Royals 25's
- State Express 555
- St Moritz Menthol
- Winfield

=== Distribution products ===
- Dji Sam Soe (:id)
- L&M
- Longbeach
- Marlboro
- ST Dupont Paris
- U Mild (:id)
