= Rottmann =

Rottmann is a German surname. Notable people with the surname include:

- Carl Rottmann (1797–1850), German landscape painter
- Manuela Rottmann (born 1972), German politician
- Nicole Rottmann (born 1989), Austrian tennis player
- Wolfgang Rottmann (born 1973), Austrian biathlete
- Sándor Rott (1868–1942), born as Sándor Rottmann, Hungarian actor

== See also ==
- 5197 Rottmann, main-belt asteroid
