= 1995 Brazilian Grand Prix =

First race of the 1995 Formula One season

Race 1 of 17 in the 1995 Formula One World Championship
← Previous race	Next race →
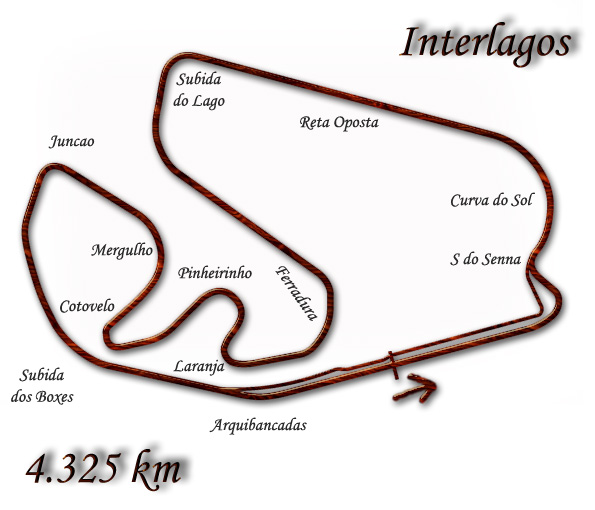

Race details
- Date: 26 March 1995
- Official name: XXIV Grande Prêmio do Brasil
- Location: Autódromo José Carlos Pace, São Paulo, Brazil
- Course: Permanent racing facility
- Course length: 4.325 km (2.687 miles)
- Distance: 71 laps, 307.075 km (190.808 miles)
- Weather: Overcast

Pole position
Driver	(United Kingdom) Damon Hill	Williams-Renault
- Time: 1:20.081

Fastest lap
Driver	(Germany) Michael Schumacher	Benetton-Renault
- Time: 1:20.921 on lap 51

Podium
First	(Germany) Michael Schumacher	Benetton-Renault
Second	(United Kingdom) David Coulthard	Williams-Renault
Third	(Austria) Gerhard Berger	Ferrari

The 1995 Brazilian Grand Prix (formally the XXIV Grande Prêmio do Brasil) was a Formula One motor race held on 26 March 1995 at the Autódromo José Carlos Pace, São Paulo, Brazil. It was the first round of the 1995 Formula One World Championship. Michael Schumacher of the Benetton team won the 71-lap race from second position. David Coulthard finished second in a Williams car, with Gerhard Berger third in a Ferrari. Damon Hill, who started the race from pole position, spun out while leading on lap 30 with an apparent gearbox problem, which was later found to be a suspension failure. Schumacher's win came despite Benetton encountering steering problems with his car during Friday practice, leading to him crashing heavily and necessitating steering component changes for the rest of the event. Despite Schumacher's victory, Hill proved to be faster during the race and seemed to be on course for a comfortable victory before his sudden retirement.

Other notable performances came from Berger, who took the final podium position despite being delayed during one of his routine pit stops due to a problem with a loose wheel nut, from Mika Häkkinen, who finished fourth for the McLaren team despite its new car proving to be uncompetitive in pre-season testing, and from Mika Salo, who drove strongly in the first half of the race to run third in his first Grand Prix for the Tyrrell team, only to suffer from a cramp and drop back to seventh place at the finish. Behind Häkkinen, the other points-scoring finishers were Jean Alesi in the second Ferrari and Mark Blundell, who drove the second McLaren. Blundell was standing in for regular driver Nigel Mansell in the second McLaren until the team could produce a wider chassis in which to accommodate him, as the car's initial cockpit design had proved to be too narrow for him to drive comfortably.

Several hours after the conclusion of the race, Schumacher and Coulthard were excluded from the race result as the chemical "fingerprint" of fuel samples from their cars taken after qualifying and the race did not match the specified sample lodged with the Fédération Internationale de l'Automobile (FIA) prior to the event. Berger was thus declared the winner, but the race stewards' decision to exclude them was overturned at an appeal hearing on April 13. Schumacher and Coulthard were reinstated in first and second places respectively, but the two teams did not receive their respective constructors' points. The Ferrari team was unhappy with the decision made at the appeal hearing; Berger called the sport "a joke". The rule concerning the legality of fuels had been changed for the 1995 season, as had the new standardised equipment used for refuelling during the race, the drivers' weighing-in procedure and the conditions of the drivers' racing licences; all of these changes produced controversies which at times threatened to overshadow the race, as did the excessively bumpy condition of the track. The race also marked the first Brazilian Grand Prix to take place since the death of Brazilian triple World Champion Ayrton Senna the previous year; his death was commemorated in various ways throughout the event.

== Background ==
The race was the first round of the 1995 Formula One World Championship after a four month break since the last race of the 1994 season in Australia. Over the winter months, the Autódromo José Carlos Pace race track was resurfaced in an attempt to reduce its bumpiness. The drivers were unhappy with the resurfacing work, though, as the track became more bumpy than in the previous year. Williams driver David Coulthard described the track as "bumpy as hell, quite unbelievable". He was also concerned about his stamina for the duration of the 71-lap race, as he had suffered from a bout of tonsillitis in the run-up to the event which had disrupted his physical training. Local Jordan driver Rubens Barrichello was even more vocal in his criticism of the track's condition, declaring that the circuit organisers were "a bunch of idiots. The track is three times bumpier than before. It is not by applying layer upon layer of tarmac that they will improve matters." Heinz-Harald Frentzen claimed that the bumping was so bad that he was close to passing out; the Sauber car handled badly over the bumps throughout the weekend.

The race marked the first Brazilian Grand Prix to be held since the death of three-time champion Ayrton Senna the previous year in a racing accident at the 1994 San Marino Grand Prix. As such, various tributes were paid to him throughout the weekend, including a parade lap on the back of a truck with all the drivers waving Brazilian flags; a display from the Brazilian Air Force which resulted in a large "S" trail in the sky; and the renaming of a local highway to Rodovia Ayrton Senna. The São Paulo city authorities had planned to rename the circuit after Senna, but the family of Carlos Pace, the existing dedicatee, objected. Barrichello also sported a special helmet design as a personal tribute to his compatriot. As a result of Senna's death, the event was lower-key than in recent years: fewer spectators turned out to watch practice and qualifying, but the race itself was watched by a capacity crowd.

The threat of a drivers' boycott over the terms of their 1995 FIA Super Licences, which allowed the FIA to demand promotional appearances and forbade the drivers from criticising the championship, was defused by the governing body prior to the race, ensuring full driver participation in the championship. Although the Super License issue was resolved with 14 teams and 28 drivers on the official 1995 entry list, the Larrousse team with drivers Éric Bernard and Christophe Bouchut did not make an appearance at the circuit for any of the on-track sessions. This was due to the team running short of money: in the period prior to the event, with French government aid not forthcoming and a 1995 chassis not yet built, team owner Gérard Larrousse elected to miss the first two rounds of the season in the hope of competing from the San Marino Grand Prix onwards.

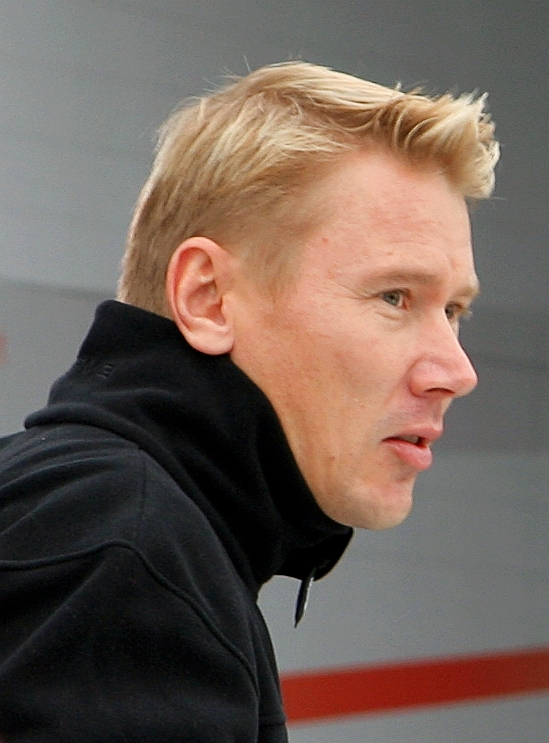
Mika Häkkinen (pictured in 2006), who was set to partner Nigel Mansell at McLaren

The construction of some of the cars was only just completed prior to the beginning of the season; the Footwork FA16 and Simtek S951 chassis arrived at the event with virtually no testing, having been completed shortly beforehand. Of the initial 1995 drivers, Pedro Diniz was the only "complete" rookie, having not been officially entered in any other Formula One race meetings, while Andrea Montermini started his first race after failing to qualify for the 1994 Spanish Grand Prix due to injury. Mika Salo and Domenico Schiattarella had competed in two races, with Taki Inoue competing in one race the previous season.

At the front of the field, Michael Schumacher and Damon Hill in the Benetton and Williams cars respectively were the favourites to battle for the Drivers' Championship, with Schumacher anticipating a "struggle" for the championship. Bernard Dudot, Renault Sport's Chief Engineer, said that he believed Benetton was less well-prepared than Williams, as the former team had changed its engine supplier to Renault, whereas Williams had been in partnership with the company since 1989. Hill arrived at the event with the psychological advantage of having set the fastest time at the final pre-season testing session at the Autódromo do Estoril, 0.35 seconds faster than Schumacher's best around the circuit. The Williams team had also completed 2,500 miles of testing with its FW17 chassis, significantly more than Benetton; the team had encountered some reliability problems with its own B195 chassis.

Heading into the new season, attention also focused on the McLaren team and its driver Nigel Mansell. He was initially announced as the partner of Mika Häkkinen; however, a week before the first race, McLaren announced that Mansell would not compete in the first two races of the new season, as he could not fit into the MP4/10 car. Mansell's arrival at McLaren was due to demand from the team's sponsors, including Philip Morris, whose brand, Marlboro, was on the car, who wanted to enjoy the publicity associated with the 1992 World Champion's return even if it meant him performing worse than teammate Häkkinen. His place at McLaren for the first two races was taken by the team's test driver, Mark Blundell, as McLaren worked to build a wider monocoque to accommodate Mansell. McLaren were also concerned about the standard refuelling equipment provided for 1995 by suppliers Intertechnique, having suffered a major leak in a test of the new rig outside of its factory. Intertechnique had redesigned the fuel equipment, which was used by all of the teams, in the wake of a pit lane fire suffered by driver Jos Verstappen during the previous year's German Grand Prix. The new fuel rigs, in addition to being half the size of the 1994, also featured longer nozzles, and were designed to lock onto the car before any fuel could begin to flow. Intertechnique traced the problem to a faulty valve within the equipment, which caused 10 kilograms (22 lb) of fuel to leak, and modified the parts accordingly. Intertechnique and the FIA advised the teams to refuel the cars slowly and carefully during pitstops to avoid any further leaks, a situation that was considered unsatisfactory by many of the team principals and mechanics. A new regulation for 1995 also mandated the teams' fuel suppliers to send samples of their fuel to the FIA prior to each Grand Prix, which the governing body would use as a reference when conducting fuel tests at the event itself. Thus only fuel approved by the FIA in advance was allowed; any deviations from the samples on file was not permitted. As before, all cars were subject to routine fuel tests as part of the scrutineering process throughout the weekend to ensure compliance with the sport's technical regulations. The rule change had been proposed by the Elf oil company in 1993 and unanimously supported by the other F1 suppliers in order to speed up the fuel-testing process.

Controversy also surrounded the new Ligier JS41 car, with rival team owners comparing it to the Benetton B195 car because of their similar design, the only apparent difference being the engine in each car. The Ligier team was being run in 1995 by Tom Walkinshaw, who had been Benetton's Engineering Director the previous season. Commenting on the design similarities, Walkinshaw said:

Mechanically it [the JS41] is totally different [from the B195] and structurally it is quite different as well. Aerodynamically, it's as close as we can make it to being the same. I don't know how you would end up with anything else if you take a core of engineers who have been working on the Benetton. Of course the damn thing looks the same. But if you go into the detail of the car, there is nothing interchangeable.

One of the rule revisions stated that the minimum weight limit of 595 kilograms (1,312 lb) applied to both car and driver together. Prior to the first session of the season, all of the drivers were weighed to establish a reference weight to be used on occasions when the two were weighed separately, or if the driver was unavailable to be weighed. As such, a small competitive advantage could be established if the driver attempted to register a weight as heavy as possible, so their actual weight when driving the car would be lower. Williams Technical Director Patrick Head estimated that a weight penalty of 7 kilograms (15 lb) could cost 14 seconds over the course of 70 laps of the circuit. In the drivers' weigh-in, Schumacher weighed in at 77 kilograms (170 lb), compared to 69 kilograms (152 lb) at the beginning of the 1994 season. Sauber driver Karl Wendlinger gained the most weight compared to 1994, gaining 22 pounds (10.0 kg). Wendlinger's teammate Frentzen and Tyrrell driver Ukyo Katayama added the least amount of weight, gaining 3 pounds (1.4 kg). When Schumacher was weighed after the race, his weight had decreased to 71.5 kilograms (158 lb), although this weight, when combined with that of his car, still left it above the limit, at 599 kilograms (1,321 lb). Schumacher explained the weight gain as a consequence of a fitness regime over the winter that had converted excess fat to muscle, and also admitted to eating and drinking heavily, in addition to refraining from using the toilet, prior to the weigh-in.

== Practice and qualifying ==
Two practice sessions were held before the race; the first was held on Friday morning, with the second held on Saturday morning. Both were held in damp conditions due to overnight rain with the track drying towards the conclusion of the respective sessions. Both sessions lasted 1 hour and 45 minutes. Qualifying was split into two one-hour sessions; the first was held on Friday afternoon with the second held on Saturday afternoon. The fastest time from either of the two qualifying sessions counted towards their final grid position.

In the first practice session, Hill was fastest with a time of 1:21.664, two thousands of a second ahead of teammate Coulthard. Schumacher was third, with the Ferrari cars of Jean Alesi and Gerhard Berger, who had been the leading two for most of the session, close behind. Blundell in the McLaren was sixth, with teammate Häkkinen finishing the session in 14th position, the Finnish driver complaining of steering problems with the car. The two Ferrari drivers used different pedal layouts in the 412T2 chassis: Berger's car was equipped with two pedals and a hand-operated clutch, whereas Alesi preferred the traditional three-pedal system.

"Michael's done a good job to show that he can get over setbacks like that and I've learnt from last year never to underestimate the guy so, the only thing I could say is with reference to the grid is that at least we've got him surrounded as far as the British are concerned, we've got two behind him, one alongside and one ahead."

— Damon Hill, commenting on Schumacher's recovery after his Friday crash.

Hill set a provisional pole position time of 1:20.081 during the first qualifying session, ahead of Berger, Coulthard, Alesi, Häkkinen and Schumacher. The session was disrupted after Schumacher crashed heavily into the tyre barrier at turn eight, a corner normally taken at a speed of 140 miles per hour (230 km/h). As a precaution, Benetton opted to keep Schumacher's teammate, Johnny Herbert, in the garage while the team found out what was wrong with the car. This meant that Herbert did not set a time in the session, while Schumacher completed only two of his twelve allotted laps. Speaking of the incident, Schumacher said that "there was a little movement in the steering wheel at the previous corner and at the next it went completely. I spun the car backwards into the tyre barrier and the safety structure behind my head did a good job of protecting me. For sure I am not very happy about this, but I believe that the team will spend a lot of time investigating the situation for tomorrow and they will find the problem." The problem was determined to be a steering failure, specifically a joint in the car's steering column. Replacement steering components were sourced from São Paulo by Benetton engineer Tim Wright, and the team did not encounter any problems over the remainder of the weekend.

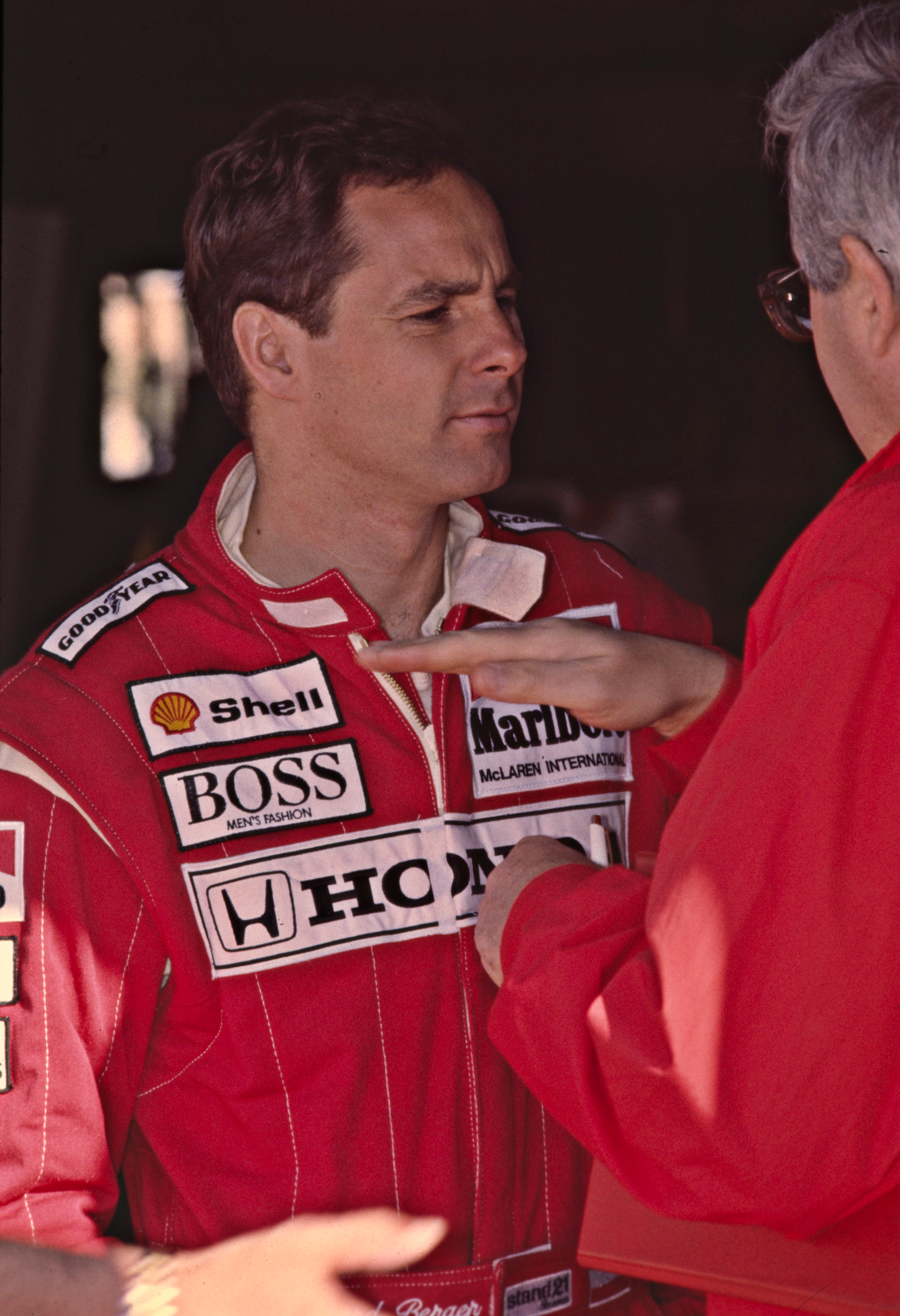
Gerhard Berger, who was the leading Ferrari driver on the starting grid (picture taken in 1991, while driving for McLaren)

The second practice session was held in wet but drying weather conditions. During the session, Schumacher went off the track at the exit of turn five, damaging his car's front wing in the process. However, he still set the fastest time of the session (1:23.607) after a change to his car's ride height proved beneficial to its performance. The top six was completed by Berger, Hill, Häkkinen, Alesi, and Olivier Panis' Ligier.

Schumacher also set the fastest time in the second qualifying session with a lap of 1:20.382, but it was not good enough to beat Hill's fastest time overall set in the first session. Hill made a set-up change that he turned out not to be happy with, but maintained his pole position, his first since the 1994 British Grand Prix. The Williams and Benetton formation continued on the second row, as Coulthard was third, with Herbert qualifying fourth after a late flying lap, equalling his best-ever qualifying position, achieved at the 1994 Italian Grand Prix for the Lotus team. However, a hole was punched in the bottom of Herbert's monocoque chassis during the session as a result of damage, leading to a night of repairs in order for him to be able to take the start in his designated race car. The work required to repair both Benetton cars caused Schumacher's race engineer, Pat Symonds, to describe the weekend as "one of the hardest [...] I can remember for many years". It also meant that three British drivers started in the top four, leading Hill to joke that "the English [sic] have got Michael surrounded". Behind the leading four, the two Ferrari cars were fifth and sixth, Berger qualifying in front of Alesi. Both were optimistic on their race prospects, despite the fact that the former suffered an engine failure during the session. The two McLaren cars of Häkkinen and Blundell were seventh and ninth, the two split by Eddie Irvine in a Jordan car. Irvine set his time despite spinning off during the session; his teammate Barrichello suffered the season's first engine failure during a timed session on Friday and then gearbox problems on Saturday, before also spinning off during that day's qualifying session, restricting him to a disappointing 16th position on the grid at his home race. Katayama and Salo proved evenly-matched for Tyrrell, qualifying in 11th and 12th respectively, behind Panis. The Minardi drivers were also close, with Pierluigi Martini and Luca Badoer taking 17th and 18th positions on the grid respectively, separated from the Tyrrell drivers by Gianni Morbidelli (Footwork), Frentzen, Aguri Suzuki (Ligier) and Barrichello. Wendlinger took 19th position, the Sauber cars handling particularly badly on the bumpy track, ahead of Bertrand Gachot and Montermini (both Pacific drivers), who sandwiched Inoue in the second Footwork. At the back of the grid, the two Forti and Simtek cars covered positions 23 to 26. Schiattarella, in a Simtek, was last out of the four positions, having caused one of the two red flags in qualifying, crashing on the exit of turn three at the beginning of the second qualifying session. The Simtek team's testing time was limited on Friday as the mandatory onboard fire extinguishers for its cars failed to arrive in time; a similar problem with the late arrival of parts affecting Martini's Minardi. The times in the second session were generally quicker, with only Hill, Badoer and Wendlinger setting their quickest lap times during the first session.

=== Qualifying classification ===
Pos	No	Driver	Constructor	Q1 Time	Q2 Time	Gap
1	5	(United Kingdom) Damon Hill	Williams-Renault	1:20.081	1:20.429	
2	1	(Germany) Michael Schumacher	Benetton-Renault	1:22.131	1:20.382	+0.301
3	6	(United Kingdom) David Coulthard	Williams-Renault	1:21.343	1:20.422	+0.341
4	2	(United Kingdom) Johnny Herbert	Benetton-Renault	No time	1:20.888	+0.807
5	28	(Austria) Gerhard Berger	Ferrari	1:21.015	1:20.906	+0.825
6	27	(France) Jean Alesi	Ferrari	1:21.655	1:21.041	+0.960
7	8	(Finland) Mika Häkkinen	McLaren-Mercedes	1:22.017	1:21.399	+1.318
8	15	(United Kingdom) Eddie Irvine	Jordan-Peugeot	1:22.370	1:21.749	+1.668
9	7	(United Kingdom) Mark Blundell	McLaren-Mercedes	1:22.821	1:21.779	+1.698
10	26	(France) Olivier Panis	Ligier-Mugen-Honda	1:22.208	1:21.914	+1.833
11	3	(Japan) Ukyo Katayama	Tyrrell-Yamaha	1:24.165	1:22.325	+2.244
12	4	(Finland) Mika Salo	Tyrrell-Yamaha	1:23.470	1:22.416	+2.335
13	9	(Italy) Gianni Morbidelli	Footwork-Hart	1:23.403	1:22.468	+2.387
14	30	(Germany) Heinz-Harald Frentzen	Sauber-Ford	1:24.065	1:22.872	+2.791
15	25	(Japan) Aguri Suzuki	Ligier-Mugen-Honda	1:23.251	1:22.971	+2.890
16	14	(Brazil) Rubens Barrichello	Jordan-Peugeot	1:23.350	1:22.975	+2.894
17	23	(Italy) Pierluigi Martini	Minardi-Ford	1:56.532	1:24.383	+4.302
18	24	(Italy) Luca Badoer	Minardi-Ford	1:24.443	1:25.205	+4.362
19	29	(Austria) Karl Wendlinger	Sauber-Ford	1:24.723	1:25.161	+4.642
20	16	(France) Bertrand Gachot	Pacific-Ford	1:25.819	1:25.127	+5.046
21	10	(Japan) Taki Inoue	Footwork-Hart	1:27.036	1:25.225	+5.144
22	17	(Italy) Andrea Montermini	Pacific-Ford	1:27.440	1:25.886	+5.805
23	22	(Brazil) Roberto Moreno	Forti-Ford	1:27.204	1:26.269	+6.188
24	12	(Netherlands) Jos Verstappen	Simtek-Ford	2:01.610	1:27.323	+7.242
25	21	(Brazil) Pedro Diniz	Forti-Ford	No time	1:27.792	+7.711
26	11	(Italy) Domenico Schiattarella	Simtek-Ford	No time	1:28.106	+8.025

== Warm-up ==
The conditions for the race were dry, with a capacity crowd of some 40,000 fans turning out to watch the race. The drivers took to the track on Sunday morning for a 30-minute warm-up session. Both Williams cars maintained their good performance from qualifying; Coulthard was fastest with teammate Hill in second. Schumacher completed the top three positions. Herbert and Katayama both suffered from gearbox problems with their race cars, and elected to start the race with their teams' spare cars. The Simtek team did not take part in the session, as both drivers waited for stronger suspension components flown out from the United Kingdom to be fitted to the cars for the race. Minutes before the race started, a press release from the FIA was given to all media and team personnel, notifying them that the chromatographic analysis of the Elf fuel samples taken from Schumacher's Benetton and the Coulthard's Williams during qualifying did not match the sample provided by the fuel company before the start of the season for reference purposes, thus rendering both cars illegal. Both teams were fined $30,000 and raced under appeal, as the standard penalty for the offence was disqualification from the event. Neither Schumacher nor Coulthard were informed of the situation, as the teams did not want to unsettle their drivers before the race start. Hill and Herbert's races were not affected by the judgement, despite using the same type of fuel. Samples from Ferrari's Agip and McLaren's Mobil fuel were also tested; both were in accordance with the regulations. Though 26 cars qualified for the race, only 25 took the start: Martini retired on the parade lap, his Minardi car suffering a gearbox problem.

== Race ==
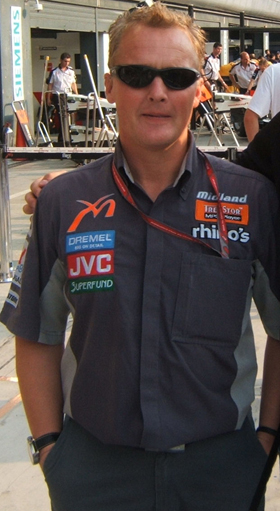
Johnny Herbert, who dropped to tenth place in the opening laps of the Grand Prix (picture taken in 2006 while an employee of the Midland F1 team)

Hill had a bad start from pole position, allowing Schumacher to overtake him into turn one. Panis, who started from tenth position in a Ligier, spun at the first corner after a nudge from Katayama, hitting the wall in the process and retiring from the race. Herbert, racing the spare Benetton chassis, dropped three places by the end of lap one, dropping behind Häkkinen and the two Ferrari cars. Blundell also made a poor start, dropping to fourteenth position after his gearbox changed from first to third gear as he accelerated away from the grid. At the end of the first lap, the race order was Schumacher leading Hill, from Coulthard, Häkkinen, Berger, Alesi, Herbert, Irvine, Katayama and Salo, with the two Tyrrell drivers switching places on the next lap. At the start of lap three, Hill attempted to overtake Schumacher heading into turn five, but Schumacher closed the door on Hill. Hill lost the advantage for a moment, with teammate Coulthard drawing alongside, but unable to get past with Hill on the inside line into turn six. Henceforth, Schumacher and Hill began to gradually pull away from Coulthard, who realised that he could not match the pace of the leaders and settled into his own rhythm, albeit one that was still comfortably faster than the cars behind him. By lap five, Herbert had dropped down to tenth position, unhappy with the handling of the spare car and having been overtaken by Irvine, Salo and Katayama. On lap ten, Schumacher lapped last-placed Diniz for the first time; the presence of slower cars a constant factor for the front-runners thereafter. On the same lap Frentzen retired from 12th position with electrical failure. He was joined by Schiattarella two laps later after his Simtek car developed a steering problem. Irvine made a pit stop earlier than expected on lap fifteen, retiring from the race with a gearbox actuator problem. On the same lap, Katayama spun at the fourth corner, stalled his car in the process and retired from the race. The two retirements meant Herbert moved back up to eighth position. Alesi was the first of the leading drivers to make a scheduled pit stop on lap 17, rejoining the track in eleventh place. Barrichello, Irvine's teammate, retired a lap later, driving into the pit lane slowly with a gearbox problem. On the same lap, Verstappen retired his Simtek car with a clutch problem.

The Benetton and Williams teams were employing different pit stop strategies – the Benetton team were planning a three stop strategy whereas the Williams team were only planning for two stops. Schumacher made a pit stop on lap 18, but was momentarily baulked by the slowing Jordan car of Barrichello as he was entering the pitlane. Schumacher exited the stop behind Berger, but overtook the Austrian driver at the beginning of the next lap. Hill, who had remained close behind Schumacher before the German made a pit stop, made his own stop on lap 21, exiting the pitlane in front of Schumacher. Coulthard took the lead of the race for one lap, before pitting and dropping behind the two leaders and the yet-to-stop Häkkinen and Berger. Häkkinen and Berger were the final drivers of the leading teams to pit, however, the McLaren mechanics had trouble getting the fuel hose off the Finn's car when he stopped on lap 23, losing him ten seconds. Several other teams experienced problems with attaching and detaching the refuelling nozzles, and occasional small sprays of fuel were observed, reinforcing the problem experienced by McLaren with the equipment before the race meeting. Berger, adopting a strategy of pitting late, was the only driver not to have stopped by lap 24 and thus was third, with Hill, Schumacher, Coulthard, Alesi and Salo the other drivers in the top six places. Salo's stop had been faultless, gaining him significant time on those drivers who had been running in front of him. By this stage Gachot had retired his Pacific car after it got stuck in fifth gear. Berger made his stop on lap 27, but had problems leaving the pit lane after a communication problem between him and his mechanics nearly led to him leaving the pit lane with a loose wheel nut on the front right-hand wheel. The pit "lollipop", signalling the driver when to leave, was raised and lowered again in quick succession, preventing Berger from leaving until the wheel nut was sufficiently tightened. The miscommunication cost Berger 13 seconds, dropping him back to seventh position. Alesi fell behind Salo and Häkkinen after the first set of pit stops, Salo overtaking him on lap 25, with Häkkinen moving past three laps later as Alesi was held up behind the lapped Montermini.

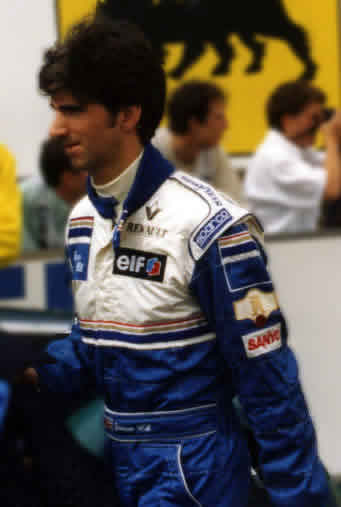
Damon Hill (pictured at the 1995 French Grand Prix), who spun out of the race on lap 30 from the lead with suspected gear box failure

Once in front of Schumacher, Hill was able to gradually extend his lead to 3.4 seconds by lap 30 despite carrying a heavier fuel load for one fewer planned pit stop. However, he lost second gear during the course of that lap, and then spun off at turn two on lap 31, retiring from the race with a suspected gearbox seizure. On the same lap, Herbert also retired from the race after suffering damage in a collision with Suzuki, who himself had to make an unscheduled pit stop to replace his car's damaged nosecone. Schumacher thus assumed the lead as a result of Hill's retirement, leading by 11.5 seconds from Coulthard. Salo was third in the remaining Tyrrell, 39.4 seconds behind Coulthard. Häkkinen and the two Ferrari cars completed the top six positions. Schumacher made his second pit stop on lap 37, exiting in second position behind Coulthard. Salo and Häkkinen, both performing much better than had been expected prior to the race, battled over third position until lap 39, when Salo, suffering from cramp and driving with one hand, spun at the final bend. He made a pit stop soon after for fresh tyres, dropping to eighth position. Häkkinen, having moved up to third, made his second stop on lap 43, exiting behind the two Ferrari cars, Berger moving in front of Alesi as the latter made his stop on the following lap, rejoining in seventh. Coulthard made a pit stop from the lead on lap 47, the gap between him and Schumacher not big enough to allow him to maintain the lead. Schumacher set the fastest lap of the race, 1:30.921, extending his lead to such an extent that when he made his own final stop on lap 52, he maintained the lead. After his final stop, Schumacher gradually opened his leading margin 11 seconds, winning the race after 71 laps in a time of 1:48:49.972s, with Coulthard finishing second in his Williams. The Ferrari cars of Berger – who made his final stop on lap 49 without losing a place – and Alesi were third and fifth respectively, but off the pace as Schumacher lapped them both in the closing stages. Häkkinen, despite losing part of his rear wing after his car was struck by a bird, split them both to take fourth position. In the closing stages, Morbidelli and Blundell both overtook Salo, only for the Footwork driver to retire on lap 62 with a blocked fuel line. Blundell, who had earlier changed his steering wheel and was driving without the use of third gear, thus took the final point in sixth place, ahead of Salo, Suzuki, Montermini – who completed the race distance despite struggling with a broken floor on his chassis, taking the Pacific team's first race finish – and Diniz. The race saw a high attrition rate; only ten out of the 25 starters finished the race. Of the other late retirements, Wendlinger suffered a broken battery cable on lap 41, Roberto Moreno and Badoer retired on lap 47 due to a spin and gearbox problem respectively, and Inoue's car caught fire on lap 48. The Japanese driver was in any case due to receive the black flag for receiving an illegal push-start from the marshals following a spin on the circuit.

== Post-race ==
"It's difficult to believe what has happened this weekend and in no way would I have imagined this race. I was settled already for second or third position, I would have been very happy with it, but winning that race is just great."

— Michael Schumacher, commenting on the weekend in the post-race press conference.

Moments after his spin, Hill was interviewed by the BBC, revealing that his spin was due to a gearbox problem; the Williams car losing second gear before apparently seizing completely. Hill also said that he was "very, very disappointed" with the result, and that "we could have beaten him [Schumacher] today". Further post-race analysis conducted by the Williams team, however, found that the problem was actually a broken left-rear suspension pushrod.

Schumacher felt lucky to win the race, conceding that "Damon was a little bit quicker than me...he ended up going off and that's racing, but I don't think I could have caught him." He also believed that his good start was fortunate, as it was the first one he had made in the new Benetton car; the team had not practised starts previously due to being short of time. He also specified his evasion of Barrichello's slowing car in the pit-lane entry while making his first stop as a crucial moment of the race. Coulthard admitted that he had been affected by his tonsillitis: "I wasn't able to match Michael and Damon's pace so I settled for running my own race". Berger, meanwhile, was frustrated to finish a lap down on Schumacher, saying that "He was faster everywhere: down the straights, going in and out of the corners. What can you do in these conditions? Okay, the car's roadholding is not bad. We must work very hard now. But at least I finished, that's something."

After the Grand Prix, Schumacher's Benetton and Coulthard's Williams cars were excluded from the race classification as a result of the illegal fuel sample "fingerprints", and Berger declared the new victor. Further samples of both cars' fuel were taken after the race; these also did not match the specified sample. Patrick Head was surprised by this outcome as he believed that "there was no question of disqualification until the fuel samples had been returned to Europe for further analysis". In addition to Benetton and Williams, fuel samples were taken from the Ferrari (Agip) and McLaren (Mobil) cars during the event, all of which were declared legal after FIA analysis. After an appeal was made by the two teams, the drivers were reinstated into the race classification at the hearing on April 13 (after the Argentine Grand Prix had taken place); however, the teams did not receive Constructors' points. The two teams were fined a further $200,000 during the hearing. It was generally agreed that the illegal fuel did not offer a performance advantage or break any of the regulations relating to chemical composition, only that it did not precisely match the sample that had previously been lodged with the FIA. Niki Lauda, an advisor to Ferrari, was not happy with the decision made at the appeal:

I cannot separate car and driver completely. If this is a new rule, you can build an illegal car and let the team pay for victory. The whole thing is only commercial and has nothing to do with sport any more. It's like scoring a half-goal in soccer – it is not possible. Either you score a goal or not. The decision for me is the biggest defeat for the FIA, who cannot govern the sport any longer.

Berger also commented on the situation, saying "I no longer understand anything. Formula One has become a joke." In the lead-up to the San Marino Grand Prix, Schumacher was quoted saying that Berger should "concentrate on racing instead of thinking how he can criticise me. I have never understood how someone can celebrate a victory like that [Brazil] one lap down and winning after someone else has been disqualified." Berger responded to Schumacher's comments by saying:

I never criticised Schumacher. I only criticised the decision [to reinstate him]. I can live with Schumacher being angry. I was declared the winner by the FIA Stewards so I have every reason to open the champagne.

Max Mosley, the president of the FIA, also responded to Schumacher's comments saying that his comments "reflect poorly on the sport and show a lack of adult attitude". Mosley also commented on the weight issue surrounding Schumacher saying that "it is a pity that it became a matter for public discussion, whether he drank a huge amount of water, didn't go to the loo or had a heavy helmet. It is just a pity he didn't take care that it didn't happen". Elf was also unhappy with the way in which the episode had been handled, the company's Commercial Director Michel Bonnet declaring that "We believe the FIA acted in a high-handed manner in disqualifying our two cars so quickly. It should have declared the results provisional and waited for the results of further analysis. Acting the way it did, the FIA has affected the image of large industrial companies, of top F1 teams and of famous drivers. The fact that we have been treated as cheats by a red team – probably red with embarrassment at having finished one lap behind our cars – and by Gerhard Berger is a serious slur against us." Elf also threatened to take the matter to a tribunal if the cars were not reinstated. Company representative Valerie Jorquera also highlighted the need for a consistent chromatographic analysis of fuel samples, drawing attention to the fact that the samples provided during the event had been analysed by a different company than the reference sample, and that the differences may have been caused by the use of different analytical machines and methods. The incident was seen as unfortunate for the sport, which was trying to make a fresh start after several controversies the previous year. From the San Marino Grand Prix onwards, an FIA mobile fuel laboratory accompanied the teams to each event to permit more detailed testing at the track, in addition to ensuring consistency between events.

=== Race classification ===
Pos	No	Driver	Constructor	Laps	Time/Retired	Grid	Points
1	1	(Germany) Michael Schumacher	Benetton-Renault	71	1:38:34.154	2	10
2	6	(United Kingdom) David Coulthard	Williams-Renault	71	+11.060	3	6
3	28	(Austria) Gerhard Berger	Ferrari	70	+1 lap	5	4
4	8	(Finland) Mika Häkkinen	McLaren-Mercedes	70	+1 lap	7	3
5	27	(France) Jean Alesi	Ferrari	70	+1 lap	6	2
6	7	(United Kingdom) Mark Blundell	McLaren-Mercedes	70	+1 lap	9	1
7	4	(Finland) Mika Salo	Tyrrell-Yamaha	69	+2 laps	12	
8	25	(Japan) Aguri Suzuki	Ligier-Mugen-Honda	69	+2 laps	15	
9	17	(Italy) Andrea Montermini	Pacific-Ford	65	+6 laps	22	
10	21	(Brazil) Pedro Diniz	Forti-Ford	64	+7 laps	25	
Ret	9	(Italy) Gianni Morbidelli	Footwork-Hart	62	Engine	13	
Ret	10	(Japan) Taki Inoue	Footwork-Hart	48	Engine	21	
Ret	24	(Italy) Luca Badoer	Minardi-Ford	47	Engine	18	
Ret	22	(Brazil) Roberto Moreno	Forti-Ford	47	Spun off	23	
Ret	29	(Austria) Karl Wendlinger	Sauber-Ford	41	Electrical	19	
Ret	5	(United Kingdom) Damon Hill	Williams-Renault	30	Gearbox	1	
Ret	2	(United Kingdom) Johnny Herbert	Benetton-Renault	30	Collision	4	
Ret	16	(France) Bertrand Gachot	Pacific-Ford	23	Gearbox	20	
Ret	14	(Brazil) Rubens Barrichello	Jordan-Peugeot	16	Gearbox	16	
Ret	12	(Netherlands) Jos Verstappen	Simtek-Ford	16	Gearbox	24	
Ret	3	(Japan) Ukyo Katayama	Tyrrell-Yamaha	15	Spun off	11	
Ret	15	(United Kingdom) Eddie Irvine	Jordan-Peugeot	15	Gearbox	8	
Ret	11	(Italy) Domenico Schiattarella	Simtek-Ford	12	Steering	26	
Ret	30	(Germany) Heinz-Harald Frentzen	Sauber-Ford	10	Electrical	14	
Ret	26	(France) Olivier Panis	Ligier-Mugen-Honda	0	Collision	10	
DNS	23	(Italy) Pierluigi Martini	Minardi-Ford	0	Gearbox	17	

== Championship standings after the race ==
Drivers' Championship standings
Pos	Driver	Points
1	(Germany) Michael Schumacher	10
2	(United Kingdom) David Coulthard	6
3	(Austria) Gerhard Berger	4
4	(Finland) Mika Häkkinen	3
5	(France) Jean Alesi	2

Constructors' Championship standings
Pos	Constructor	Points
1	(Italy) Ferrari	6
2	(United Kingdom) McLaren-Mercedes	4

- Note: Only the top five positions are included for the Drivers' standings. Only top two included for the Constructors' standings as only two teams had scored points. Benetton and Williams did not receive Constructors' points at this race.

Previous race: 1994 Australian Grand Prix	FIA Formula One World Championship; 1995 season	Next race: 1995 Argentine Grand Prix
Previous race: 1994 Brazilian Grand Prix	Brazilian Grand Prix	Next race: 1996 Brazilian Grand Prix
