= 1995 Monaco Grand Prix =

Coordinates: 43°44′4.74″N 7°25′16.8″E

Race 5 of 17 in the 1995 Formula One World Championship
← Previous race	Next race →
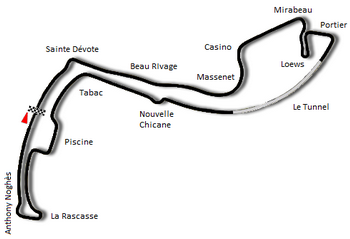

Race details
- Date: 28 May 1995
- Official name: LIII Grand Prix de Monaco
- Location: Circuit de Monaco, Monte Carlo, Monaco
- Course: Temporary street circuit
- Course length: 3.328 km (2.068 miles)
- Distance: 78 laps, 259.584 km (161.297 miles)
- Weather: Warm, sunny
- Attendance: 48,000

Pole position
Driver	(United Kingdom) Damon Hill	Williams-Renault
- Time: 1:21.952

Fastest lap
Driver	(France) Jean Alesi	Ferrari
- Time: 1:24.621 on lap 36

Podium
First	(Germany) Michael Schumacher	Benetton-Renault
Second	(United Kingdom) Damon Hill	Williams-Renault
Third	(Austria) Gerhard Berger	Ferrari

The 1995 Monaco Grand Prix (formally the LIII Grand Prix de Monaco) was a Formula One motor race held on 28 May 1995 at the Circuit de Monaco, Monte Carlo, Monaco. It was the fifth round of the 1995 Formula One season. The 78-lap race was won by Michael Schumacher for the Benetton team after starting from second position. Damon Hill finished second for Williams after starting from pole position and leading the first 23 laps of the race, ahead of Gerhard Berger in a Ferrari car. The remaining points-scoring positions were filled by Johnny Herbert in the second Benetton, Mark Blundell (McLaren) and Heinz-Harald Frentzen (Sauber). Schumacher's win was his third of the season thus far and extended his lead in the World Drivers' Championship over Hill to five points. It was also Renault's first win in the Monaco Grand Prix, as Benetton's engine supplier.

Schumacher won the race comfortably, over 30 seconds ahead of Hill. Hill's speed advantage in qualifying, in which he had set a lap time almost one second faster than Schumacher, vanished in the race, enabling Schumacher to follow him closely from the start, despite carrying a heavier fuel load for a one-stop pit strategy, as opposed to Hill's two. When Hill made his first pit stop, Schumacher took the lead, and stayed ahead of his rival for the remainder of the race. Hill also dropped behind the one-stopping Ferrari of Jean Alesi, but the latter crashed on lap 42 whilst attempting to avoid the lapped Ligier of Martin Brundle, who had spun in front of him. Hill's Williams teammate, David Coulthard, retired from the race due to a gearbox failure after initially running in third place. In total, sixteen of the 26 entrants failed to finish, including both drivers for the Simtek team, which subsequently ran out of money and withdrew from the sport before the Canadian Grand Prix. The race was also marked by an accident at the first corner of the first lap involving Coulthard, Alesi and Berger, which caused the track to become blocked and the race to be restarted as a result.

== Report ==
=== Background ===
Heading into the fifth race of the season, Benetton driver Michael Schumacher was leading the Drivers' Championship with 24 points, a single point ahead of Williams driver Damon Hill. The two Ferrari drivers, Jean Alesi and Gerhard Berger, lay third and fourth in the rankings with 14 and 13 points respectively, whilst David Coulthard and Johnny Herbert, in the second Williams and Benetton respectively, had scored 9 points each. Just four points separated these three teams in the Constructors' Championship, with Ferrari (27 points) leading Williams (26) and Benetton (23). After a trying start to the season, Schumacher had dominated the preceding Spanish Grand Prix, but both championships were open, with no strong favourite for the race victory.

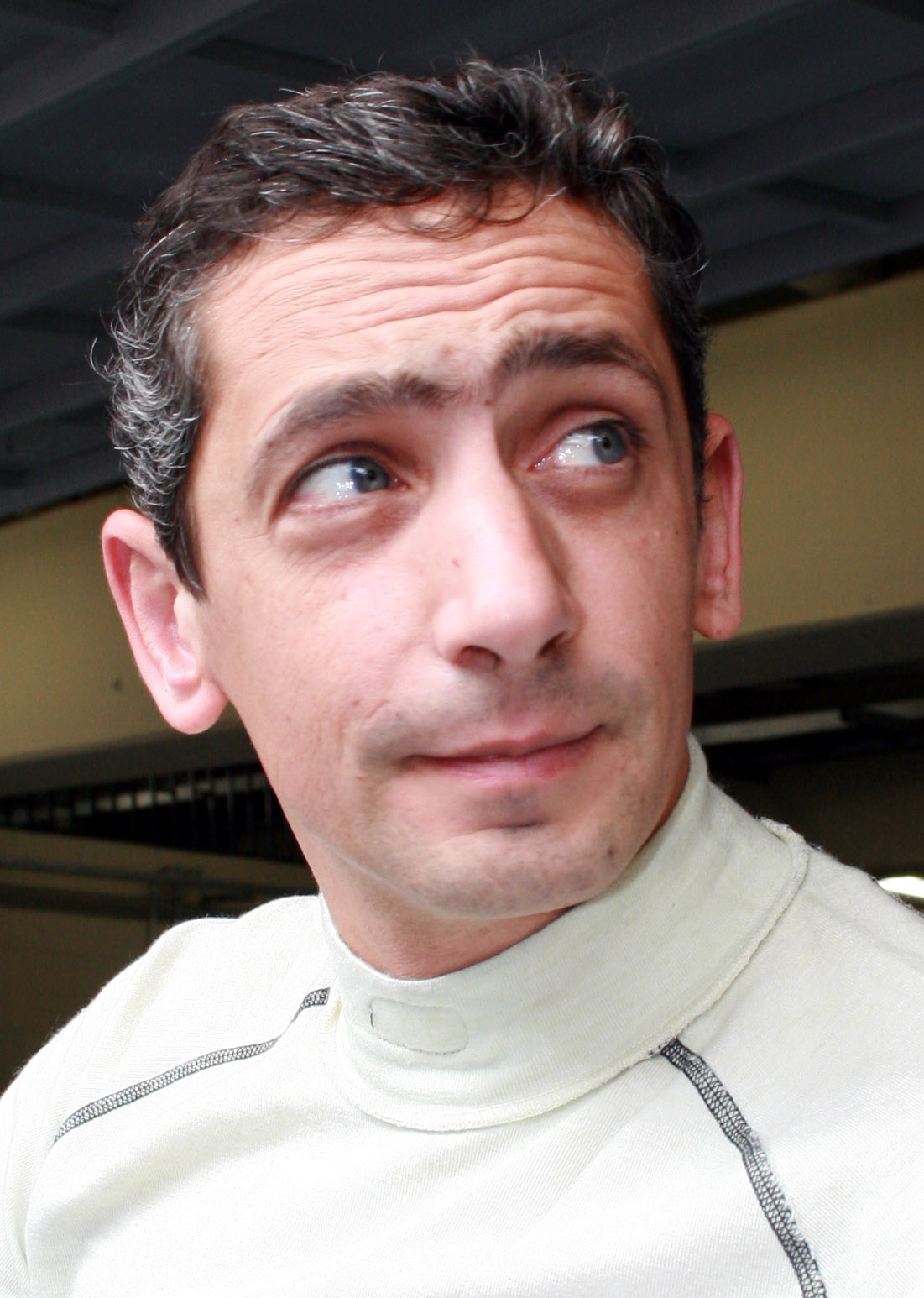
Jean-Christophe Boullion (pictured in 2007) made his Formula One début with the Sauber team, replacing Karl Wendlinger.

There were two driver changes going into the event: McLaren driver Nigel Mansell was replaced by the team's test driver, Mark Blundell, and Sauber driver Karl Wendlinger was replaced by Williams test driver and reigning International Formula 3000 champion Jean-Christophe Boullion. Mansell's departure was the main talking point prior to the beginning of the race meeting, as it brought the 1992 World Champion's troubled relationship with McLaren to an end after just two races with the team. Mansell had made a part-time return to Formula One in 1994 as a replacement for the late Ayrton Senna at Williams, but was passed over in favour of Coulthard for 1995 and opted to sign for McLaren instead. When he tested the MP4-10 chassis for the first time, it became apparent that it had a major handling imbalance, and, more seriously, that he did not fit comfortably in the cockpit. Mansell was thus forced to miss the opening two races of the season whilst the team built a wider monocoque to accommodate him. He competed in the San Marino and Spanish Grands Prix in the wider MP4-10B, but struggled to match the pace of teammate Mika Häkkinen and retired his otherwise healthy car from the latter race with handling problems. Mansell and team principal Ron Dennis subsequently agreed a mutual termination of their contract, and Blundell was restored to the seat that he had already occupied in the first two races. Blundell was employed on a race-by-race basis. The split marked the end of Mansell's Formula One career. His presence was still strong at Monaco, however, as the official tickets and publicity material featured a prominent image of his McLaren.

Wendlinger had crashed heavily in practice for the previous year's Monaco Grand Prix, sustaining a serious head injury from which it took the rest of the season for him to recover. Since rejoining Sauber at the beginning of the current season, he had struggled to match his pre-accident form, lapping several seconds per lap slower than teammate Heinz-Harald Frentzen in the first four Grands Prix. Sauber released a statement clarifying that Wendlinger had not been sacked, and that he would still test for the team with a view to improving his performance. Boullion, who made his Formula One début as a result, was loaned to Sauber by Frank Williams, who was keen to use the known quantity of his test driver to evaluate Frentzen's potential for a future race seat in his team. Frentzen was in his second season of Formula One, but this event also marked his first race start at Monaco, as Sauber had withdrawn him from the previous year's race after Wendlinger's accident.

The state of the Simtek team's finances was also a major topic of interest. On the Thursday before the race weekend, team principal Nick Wirth held a press conference in which he admitted that the outfit faced imminent closure unless it received money that had been promised by various sponsors. Wirth admitted that Simtek faced a budget shortfall of several million dollars needed to complete the season, part of which was due to him being the victim of "a broken deal". He also pledged to arrange a meeting of all Simtek's financial backers over the race weekend in an attempt to raise additional capital, and that the team would not travel to the following Canadian Grand Prix, an expensive "fly-away" race, unless a rescue package was negotiated successfully. The team was already reduced to three gearboxes for the Monaco race meeting.

Due to the configuration of the Circuit de Monaco, with its low average speed and abundance of low-speed corners, allied to the low-grip nature of the public road surface, the teams all set their cars up to produce the maximum amount of downforce and mechanical grip possible. Ferrari introduced a revised rear wing and diffuser design for the 412T2 chassis, allowing more space for downforce-generating winglets around the rear bodywork. The team also introduced two new suspension configurations, one used by Alesi and the other tested by Berger on his spare car. As was traditional at Monaco, Ferrari also brought an additional spare car, bringing the team's total number of chassis to four. The Sauber team introduced new front and rear wings and a revised diffuser, in addition to a slightly lightened C14 chassis design. Benetton, Footwork and Tyrrell also added additional flaps and wings to the rear bodywork of their cars, whilst the latter team also applied its "Hydrolink" suspension design to the rear of the 023 for the first time. Lead Forti driver Pedro Diniz was given a new monocoque which weighed 4 kilograms (8.8 lb) less than the first two FG01 tubs to have been built, and Minardi débuted a new exhaust system on its M195 to increase the power produced by the Ford engine.

=== Practice and qualifying ===
Two practice sessions were held before the race; the first was held from 09:30 to 11:15 local time on Thursday, and an identically timed session was also held on Saturday. Each driver was limited to 23 laps of free practice per day. The qualifying period was split into two one-hour sessions; the first was held on Thursday afternoon from 13:00 to 14:00 local time, with the second held on Saturday afternoon at the same time. The fastest time set by each driver from either session counted towards his final grid position. Each driver was limited to twelve laps per qualifying session.

Alesi set the pace in Thursday free practice, which took place in bright and sunny weather conditions, with a time of 1:25.457. Schumacher and Hill were second and third, separated from their teammates by the two improved McLarens, with Häkkinen ahead of the returning Blundell. Berger was over two seconds slower than Alesi with the ninth-fastest lap time. Schumacher was unhappy with the handling of his car, and so the rear end of the B195 was stripped down for a precautionary check before qualifying. Further back, Frentzen set the eighteenth-fastest time after his Sauber shed its engine cover during the session. Boullion fared even worse, as he crashed at the Nouvelle Chicane in a manner reminiscent of Wendlinger's accident the year before, but he was unhurt. Simtek's shortage of gearboxes was also apparent: lead driver Jos Verstappen's unit only allowed him to complete five laps before developing problems, but teammate Domenico Schiattarella set an encouraging 14th-fastest time.

"Here, unlike most of the tracks, the driver contributes 60 per cent of the result against 40 for the car. This is because the qualities of the chassis are not so important on these twists and turns. Guts are more important."

— Jean Alesi, commenting on taking provisional pole position on Thursday.

Thursday qualifying was held in similar weather conditions to practice, but was interrupted by a brief shower of rain close to the end of the session. Alesi carried his form over from free practice, nudging the crash barriers lining the circuit on more than one occasion to set a provisional pole position time of 1:23.754. Berger was also impressive, power-sliding through Casino Square, to the delight of the crowd, on his way to the third-fastest time, although he complained that Alesi had held him up on what he thought would have been his quickest lap of the session. The form of the Ferraris came as something of a surprise, as the 41T2's unique V12 engine configuration theoretically produced less torque than its rivals, a disadvantage on a circuit as tight as Monaco. Alesi said that he believed the results of the session were due to the extreme effort that he and Berger were putting into their driving overcoming any deficiencies with the car. The Ferraris were split by Schumacher, who felt that the rain shower had prevented him from fulfilling his potential, as he did not complete his full quota of 12 laps as a result of the track conditions becoming slower. His teammate, Herbert, took provisional sixth place. Of the Williams drivers, Hill was fourth, but Coulthard admitted that he was still learning the track on his way to 11th, 2.8 seconds slower than Alesi's best. Häkkinen continued McLaren's promising form with a provisional fifth place, but was fined $10,000 for ignoring yellow flags during the season. Blundell was back in eighth after crashing into the barriers in the closing minutes of the session.

Frentzen impressed by setting the seventh-fastest time in his first Monaco qualifying session, despite having to take to the escape road at the Nouvelle Chicane after encountering the rain shower whilst on a flying lap. After his morning accident, Boullion drove steadily to take a provisional 21st position, complaining of a dire lack of grip from the C14 chassis. Another Monaco rookie, Eddie Irvine, out-paced his more experienced Jordan teammate, Rubens Barrichello, as the pair set the ninth and 13th-fastest times respectively. They were split by Coulthard and the Ligier drivers, with Martin Brundle ahead of Olivier Panis, despite the former crashing at La Rascasse and removing his rear wing as the rain fell. Gianni Morbidelli, who took 14th place, was another driver to crash during the sudden change to wet conditions, as did Footwork teammate Taki Inoue on his way to 24th position. Minardi drivers Luca Badoer and Pierluigi Martini occupied the provisional eighth row of the grid, just ahead of Tyrrell teammates Mika Salo and Ukyo Katayama, both of whom complained of poor handling over the bumps and understeer, despite the expected benefits of the Hydrolink suspension.

Towards the back of the Thursday time sheet, Schiattarella and Verstappen shared the former's chassis to set the 20th and 19th-fastest times respectively, as Verstappen's gearbox was still refusing to run smoothly. Schiattarella spun at La Rascasse and attempted to execute a spin-turn at the blind entry to the corner, almost collecting Roberto Moreno's Forti in the process; he was given a $20,000 fine, suspended for three races, for "creating a very dangerous situation". Verstappen then took over the car and crashed it, restricting the Simtek team to a total of nine laps between its two drivers. Behind Boullion, Andrea Montermini (Pacific) set the 22nd-quickest time, ahead of Moreno, who had to share his car with Diniz after the latter's gearbox failed, restricting him to 25th place, over four seconds slower than his teammate. Occupying the last spot on the provisional grid, Bertrand Gachot failed to set a time due to a sheared brake disc on his Pacific, which caused his left-rear wheel to fall off on his first out-lap, forcing him to abandon his car out on the circuit.

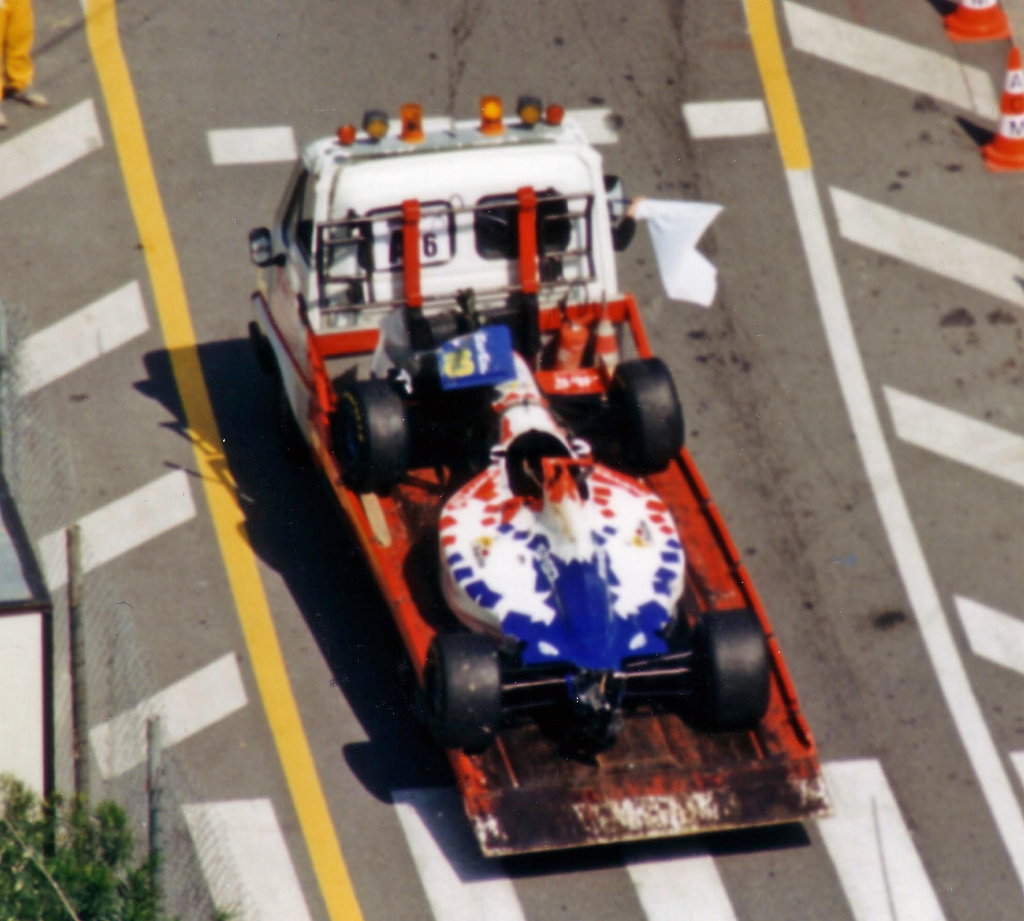
Taki Inoue's Footwork is transported back to the pit lane having been hit by the safety car after Saturday morning practice.

After taking Friday off – a feature of the event timetable unique to Monaco – the drivers returned to action on Saturday in bright and warm conditions. Hill set the pace with a time of 1:23.468, which was the fastest lap of the weekend thus far. He was almost 0.8 seconds ahead of Alesi, who in turn led Coulthard, Häkkinen, Berger and Panis. Schumacher was back in seventh place after damaging his car's suspension in a collision with Frentzen exiting Casino Square, restricting him to 11 laps only. Frentzen later crashed heavily after losing control under braking for Massenet, punching a hole in the Sauber's monocoque in the process. Blundell also crashed his McLaren at La Rascasse, but the damage was easier to repair.

The main drama of the day occurred after the practice session had ended. Inoue had spun and stalled his Footwork, which was being towed back to the pit lane by a recovery vehicle when it was struck from behind by the Renault Clio safety car – which was being taken on quick demonstration laps of the circuit in the hands of rally driver Jean Ragnotti, with the Fédération Internationale de l'Automobile's press delegate as passenger – in the middle of the Piscine complex. The impact was sufficient to overturn the Footwork and render it a write-off: the FA16 sustained severe rear-end damage to the engine and gearbox, whilst the tow rope, attached to the car's crash structure behind the driver's head, pulled the roll hoop from the chassis. Inoue, who still sitting in the cockpit with his helmet on but his seatbelts unfastened, sustained two impacts to the head, the severity of which was shown by the fact that a chunk had been taken out of his helmet. He was taken to The Princess Grace Hospital Centre for a brain scan and, although he was found to have sustained only a slight concussion, was not permitted to take part in the afternoon qualifying session as a precaution. The Footwork team principal, Jackie Oliver, was infuriated by the incident, and wrote an official letter of complaint to the Automobile Club de Monaco, the body responsible for organising the event. He said that Inoue would have been killed had he not been wearing his helmet, and questioned the organisation of the ACM and Ragnotti's attitude: "Why was Ragnotti out there? It's just lack of discipline. I understand he had accomplished a couple of laps before at a million miles an hour with handbrake turns at the Loews hairpin. What was the purpose of him doing it? Was it to give officials a thrill?" The stewards tacitly acknowledged that the incident was not Inoue's fault by authorising him to use the team's spare car for qualifying, but this was rendered academic by his non-participation in the session.

"When Michael did his quick lap early in the session, I thought Benetton was seriously back in the groove again and we would be in trouble, but it all unfolded for me. My last run was the nearest to a perfect lap I think I have ever produced. Now I've got my sixth pole and I want to follow that with the sixth win for the Hill family at Monaco."

— Damon Hill, commenting on taking pole position, and the prospect of adding to his father's total of Monaco wins, on Saturday.

The afternoon's final qualifying session took place in similar good weather conditions to the morning's running. The Ligier drivers were the first to set quick times, and then the leading drivers began to complete their first runs: Schumacher took provisional pole position with a time of 1:23.139, set twenty minutes into the session, and Berger went 0.5 seconds to move up to third. Five minutes later, Hill lowered the benchmark to 1:23.294; Schumacher responded with a time of 1:22.742 eight minutes afterwards; and then Hill put pole position beyond the reach of anyone else after completing a lap in 1:22.115. Schumacher was unable to improve his time on his final run, and then Hill trimmed the pole time to 1:21.952 with his own last effort of the session. It was a dominant performance from the Williams team leader, who went fastest in each of the circuit's three timing sectors, and set three distinct lap times which were all faster than Schumacher's best. Whilst Hill was delighted with his performance, Schumacher found that his Benetton was more difficult to control, and he blamed the disruptive effect of his collision with Frentzen in the morning session for the 0.8 second gap between him and Hill.

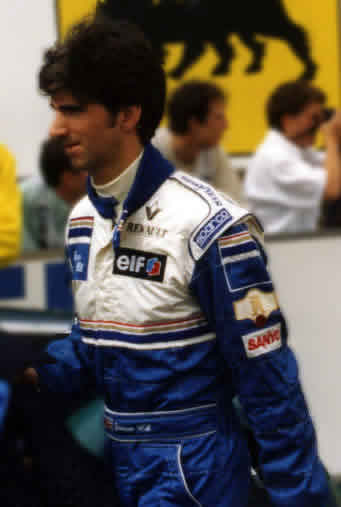
Damon Hill took a clear pole position, 0.8 seconds ahead of second-placed Michael Schumacher.

Behind the two leading runners, Ferrari's challenge for pole position faded during the final session. Alesi's car ground to a halt on his first out-lap of the session after losing hydraulic pressure, and he had to share Berger's chassis for the remainder of qualifying. This forced Berger to hurry through his planned programme, making three runs instead of four, before handing his car over to his teammate. The extensive adjustments required to tailor the car's pedal system from Berger to Alesi's preferred set-up meant that he left the pits with only two minutes and 38 seconds of the session remaining. Alesi thus had time for just one flying lap, which was spoiled when Irvine crashed his Jordan at Tabac during the final minutes. As a result, Alesi failed to improve on his Thursday time and dropped to fifth place on the grid, half a second and one position behind Berger. The team's problems allowed Coulthard to improve to third place with a time of 1:23.109, continuing his progress as he became more familiar with the circuit. Häkkinen was another driver to be caught out by Irvine's crash at the end of the session, restricting him to sixth place on the grid ahead of Herbert, who was satisfied to qualify only a second behind Schumacher. Blundell rounded out the top ten in the second McLaren, despite going up the escape road after missing his braking point at Sainte Dévote. Brundle took eighth and Irvine ninth despite his crash, which meant that all six of the British drivers qualified in the top ten.

Barrichello, outqualified by Irvine at every event thus far in 1995, set the 11th-fastest time, ahead of Panis – who complained of heavy traffic – and Morbidelli. Frentzen, like Alesi, was scheduled to take over his teammate's car after his own proved too heavily damaged to repair, but the Sauber team's programme was interrupted when Boullion crashed, also at Massanet. Frentzen thus failed to set a time and dropped to 14th on the grid, whilst Boullion had improved his time by three seconds before crashing, and took 19th place. They were split by the Tyrrell and Minardi drivers, in the order of Katayama, Badoer, Salo and Martini. Nearing the back of the grid, Schiattarella outqualified Verstappen for the first time by taking 20th position on the grid; Verstappen failed to improve on his Thursday time after another crash and further gearbox problems, and was restricted to 23rd. Gachot set the 21st-fastest time for Pacific, but on this occasion it was Montermini's turn to not set a time as a result of his car suffering a gearbox failure; he dropped to 25th place. As on Thursday, the Forti drivers again had to share a single car, as Moreno's car developed a misfire: he qualified in 24th position, two places behind Diniz. The grid, which was covered by just over 9.5 seconds, was completed by the absent Inoue.

=== Race ===
On Sunday morning, a pre-race warm-up session took place at 11:00 local time, and lasted for 30 minutes. It took place in dry weather conditions. Alesi led his teammate Berger at the top of the standings with a time of 1:24.356; both Ferrari drivers trying their race and spare cars. Schumacher was third, ahead of Häkkinen, Herbert, and Hill, who was concerned about the development of understeer in the handling of his race car, particularly in the track's slower corners. Coulthard set the 11th-fastest time, and the Williams team, worried about its cars' pace in race trim, opted to switch its planned pit strategy from one stop to two, hoping that the cars would handle better on the relatively lighter fuel load required for such tactics. Meanwhile, the Sauber mechanics had built up a new spare car for Frentzen (who was now driving the team's original spare car after the damage to his race car was found to be irreparable) and also repaired Boullion's damaged machine. Their Jordan counterparts had performed similar work on Irvine's car, whilst Barrichello's car suffered a broken wheel rim. Inoue was cleared to race, and set the slowest time of the session in the spare Footwork.

As was traditional in Monaco, the race began at the relatively late time of 15:30, allowing Prince Rainier and his family to eat lunch before viewing the event from the royal box on the start-finish straight. The race took place in warm, sunny conditions, with an ambient temperature of 23 °C (73 °F), and was watched by a total of approximately 48,000 spectators. As the drivers completed their reconnaissance laps from the pit-lane to the starting grid, an oil leak was discovered on Frentzen's Sauber, so he switched to the newly built spare car in time for the start.

As the green light signalled the start of the race, Hill and Schumacher both made brisk starts and led into Sainte Dévote, but behind them a multiple collision between Coulthard and the two Ferraris caused the race to be red-flagged to a halt. Coulthard was slightly slower away from the line and was challenged on the outside of the run to the first corner by Berger, and on the inside by Alesi. As the track narrowed at the entry to Sainte Devote, there was not enough space for the three cars to run side-by-side, and Alesi made contact with the rear-right quarter of Coulthard's car, which in turn pushed it into Berger. The Williams was launched up into the air and spun through 180 degrees before crashing down again and coming to a halt at the apex of the corner with broken suspension, whilst the two damaged Ferraris also made further contact with each other before coming to rest at the same point. Most of the pursuing drivers, led by Brundle, threaded their way through the stationary cars, but Irvine knocked off his front wing, Boullion sustained a broken diffuser, and Katayama, Salo, Morbidelli, Inoue and Schiattarella were all forced to come to a halt as they negotiated the obstacles. With the track now completely blocked, the race was halted and preparations were immediately made for a completely fresh start.

Coulthard, Berger and Alesi's cars had been damaged beyond immediate repair; all three were thus forced to race their teams' spare cars, vindicating Ferrari's customary Monaco practice of bringing an additional car for each driver. Berger's spare car, however, was fitted with an earlier-specification engine that did not produce quite as much power as his race car or Alesi's spare car, whilst the throttle on Coulthard's car was not fully calibrated in the rush to ready it for the restarted race. Irvine's Jordan and Boullion's Sauber were repaired, and the other drivers stuck at the first corner were able to restart their cars, apart from Salo and Schiattarella: the former's Yamaha engine overheated in the jam, requiring him to take the restart from the pit-lane in the spare Tyrrell, and the latter's Simtek was damaged by marshals attempting to move it from the scene of the accident. The impoverished team lacked a spare car, so Schiattarella could not take any further part in the race, and Simtek's participation in the event was ended – without either car completing a racing lap – when Verstappen's car suffered a recurrence of its persistent gearbox problems and was pushed into the pit-lane as the rest of the field embarked upon the second formation lap.

At the restart, Hill and Schumacher again held their positions, whilst Coulthard led the more circumspect Ferraris through Sainte Dévote, with Alesi jumping ahead of Berger. On this occasion there were no major incidents, although Katayama sustained light damage to his car's front wing as a result of a brush with Morbidelli. As the drivers completed the first lap, Hill led by 0.5 seconds from Schumacher, who was followed in turn by Coulthard, Alesi, Berger, Herbert, Häkkinen, Irvine, Brundle, Barrichello, Blundell, Panis, Frentzen, Badoer, Morbidelli, Katayama, Martini, Boullion, Gachot, Moreno, Montermini, Salo, Diniz and Inoue. In the early laps, Hill gradually built a lead of nearly two seconds over Schumacher by lap 10, with the two pulling away in tandem from Coulthard, who was at this point a further eight seconds behind the Benetton. By this stage there had already been two retirements: Häkkinen's Mercedes engine failed due to a fuel pump drive problem on the ninth lap of the race, and Moreno spun at Sainte Dévote when a brake fluid leak caused him to lose control of his Forti a lap later. Morbidelli also made an early unscheduled stop to cure a serious tyre vibration caused by a section of tie-rope from a tyre-warming blanket becoming jammed in one of his rear wheels, the Footwork driver dropping to the tail of the field in the process.

This was the third event to take place with electronic sensors monitoring every car for jump-starts, and at this stage of the race, six drivers (Barrichello, Brundle, Montermini, Frentzen, Morbidelli and Panis) were issued with ten-second stop-go penalties for this offence. All except Montermini came in promptly to serve their penalties – some even having to form a queue in the penalty area – but the Pacific driver failed to pit within the stipulated three laps of receiving it, whereupon he was disqualified from the race, having climbed to 17th place before belatedly serving his penalty. The penalised drivers dropped back through the field as a result of losing time, with the result that after 16 laps completed, the race order was: Hill, Schumacher, Coulthard, Alesi, Berger, Herbert, Irvine, Blundell, Badoer, Katayama, Brundle, Martini, Barrichello, Panis, Frentzen, Boullion, Salo, Montermini (yet to serve his penalty), Gachot, Inoue, Diniz and Morbidelli.

=== Post-race ===
The incident between Inoue and the safety car in practice was referred to the FIA World Motor Sport Council, which met one month after the race. The ACM received no punishment for the incident, and negotiated the payment of damages to Footwork directly with the team.

== Classification ==
=== Qualifying ===
Pos	No	Driver	Constructor	Q1 Time	Q2 Time	Gap
1	5	(United Kingdom) Damon Hill	Williams-Renault	1:24.659	1:21.952	
2	1	(Germany) Michael Schumacher	Benetton-Renault	1:24.146	1:22.742	+0.790
3	6	(United Kingdom) David Coulthard	Williams-Renault	1:26.556	1:23.109	+1.157
4	28	(Austria) Gerhard Berger	Ferrari	1:24.509	1:23.220	+1.268
5	27	(France) Jean Alesi	Ferrari	1:23.754	1:24.023	+1.802
6	8	(Finland) Mika Häkkinen	McLaren-Mercedes	1:24.831	1:23.857	+1.905
7	2	(United Kingdom) Johnny Herbert	Benetton-Renault	1:25.623	1:23.885	+1.933
8	25	(United Kingdom) Martin Brundle	Ligier-Mugen-Honda	1:26.457	1:24.447	+2.495
9	15	(United Kingdom) Eddie Irvine	Jordan-Peugeot	1:26.447	1:24.857	+2.905
10	7	(United Kingdom) Mark Blundell	McLaren-Mercedes	1:26.017	1:24.933	+2.981
11	14	(Brazil) Rubens Barrichello	Jordan-Peugeot	1:26.787	1:25.081	+3.129
12	26	(France) Olivier Panis	Ligier-Mugen-Honda	1:26.579	1:25.125	+3.173
13	9	(Italy) Gianni Morbidelli	Footwork-Hart	1:26.828	1:25.447	+3.495
14	30	(Germany) Heinz-Harald Frentzen	Sauber-Ford	1:25.661	no time	+3.709
15	3	(Japan) Ukyo Katayama	Tyrrell-Yamaha	1:28.439	1:25.808	+3.856
16	24	(Italy) Luca Badoer	Minardi-Ford	1:27.615	1:25.969	+4.017
17	4	(Finland) Mika Salo	Tyrrell-Yamaha	1:28.123	1:26.473	+4.521
18	23	(Italy) Pierluigi Martini	Minardi-Ford	1:27.714	1:26.913	+4.961
19	29	(France) Jean-Christophe Boullion	Sauber-Ford	1:30.014	1:27.145	+5.193
20	11	(Italy) Domenico Schiattarella	Simtek-Ford	1:29.439	1:28.337	+6.385
21	16	(France) Bertrand Gachot	Pacific-Ford	13:33.570	1:29.039	+7.087
22	21	(Brazil) Pedro Diniz	Forti-Ford	1:34.963	1:29.244	+7.292
23	12	(Netherlands) Jos Verstappen	Simtek-Ford	1:29.391	1:30.015	+7.439
24	22	(Brazil) Roberto Moreno	Forti-Ford	1:30.461	1:29.608	+7.656
25	17	(Italy) Andrea Montermini	Pacific-Ford	1:30.149	no time	+8.197
26	10	(Japan) Taki Inoue	Footwork-Hart	1:31.542	no time	+9.590

=== Race ===
Pos	No	Driver	Constructor	Laps	Time/Retired	Grid	Points
1	1	(Germany) Michael Schumacher	Benetton-Renault	78	1:53:11.258	2	10
2	5	(United Kingdom) Damon Hill	Williams-Renault	78	+34.817	1	6
3	28	(Austria) Gerhard Berger	Ferrari	78	+1:11.447	4	4
4	2	(United Kingdom) Johnny Herbert	Benetton-Renault	77	+1 Lap	7	3
5	7	(United Kingdom) Mark Blundell	McLaren-Mercedes	77	+1 Lap	10	2
6	30	(Germany) Heinz-Harald Frentzen	Sauber-Ford	76	+2 Laps	14	1
7	23	(Italy) Pierluigi Martini	Minardi-Ford	76	+2 Laps	18	
8	29	(France) Jean-Christophe Boullion	Sauber-Ford	74	Spun off	19	
9	9	(Italy) Gianni Morbidelli	Footwork-Hart	74	+4 Laps	13	
10	21	(Brazil) Pedro Diniz	Forti-Ford	72	+6 Laps	22	
Ret	24	(Italy) Luca Badoer	Minardi-Ford	68	Suspension	16	
Ret	26	(France) Olivier Panis	Ligier-Mugen-Honda	65	Accident	12	
Ret	4	(Finland) Mika Salo	Tyrrell-Yamaha	63	Gearbox	17	
Ret	14	(Brazil) Rubens Barrichello	Jordan-Peugeot	60	Throttle	11	
Ret	16	(France) Bertrand Gachot	Pacific-Ford	42	Gearbox	21	
Ret	27	(France) Jean Alesi	Ferrari	41	Accident	5	
Ret	25	(United Kingdom) Martin Brundle	Ligier-Mugen-Honda	40	Spun off	8	
Ret	10	(Japan) Taki Inoue	Footwork-Hart	27	Gearbox	26	
Ret	3	(Japan) Ukyo Katayama	Tyrrell-Yamaha	26	Spun off	15	
DSQ	17	(Italy) Andrea Montermini	Pacific-Ford	23	Failed to serve stop-go penalty	25	
Ret	15	(United Kingdom) Eddie Irvine	Jordan-Peugeot	22	Spun off	9	
Ret	6	(United Kingdom) David Coulthard	Williams-Renault	16	Gearbox	3	
Ret	22	(Brazil) Roberto Moreno	Forti-Ford	9	Brakes	24	
Ret	8	(Finland) Mika Häkkinen	McLaren-Mercedes	8	Engine	6	
DNS	12	(Netherlands) Jos Verstappen	Simtek-Ford	0	Gearbox	23	
DNS	11	(Italy) Domenico Schiattarella	Simtek-Ford	0	Car damaged	20	

- ^1 Montermini was black flagged for failing to serve his stop-and-go penalty within the required three laps since its issue.
- ^2 Verstappen's result is often given as a retirement rather than a failure to start, even though he did not take the second start as his gearbox failed at the start of the second formation lap.
- ^3 Schiattarella did not take the restart as his undamaged car was not recovered from the first corner, and was later seriously damaged when it fell off a recovery vehicle.

== Championship standings after the race ==
Drivers' Championship standings

Pos	Driver	Points
1	(Germany) Michael Schumacher	34
2	(United Kingdom) Damon Hill	29
3	(Austria) Gerhard Berger	17
4	(France) Jean Alesi	14
5	(United Kingdom) Johnny Herbert	12

Constructors' Championship standings

Pos	Constructor	Points
1	(United Kingdom) Benetton-Renault	36
2	(United Kingdom) Williams-Renault	32
3	(Italy) Ferrari	31
4	(United Kingdom) McLaren-Mercedes	8
5	(Switzerland) Sauber-Ford	4

- Note: Only the top five positions are included for both sets of standings.

Previous race: 1995 Spanish Grand Prix	FIA Formula One World Championship; 1995 season	Next race: 1995 Canadian Grand Prix
Previous race: 1994 Monaco Grand Prix	Monaco Grand Prix	Next race: 1996 Monaco Grand Prix
