= 1995 Spanish Grand Prix =

Race 4 of 17 in the 1995 Formula One World Championship
← Previous race	Next race →

Race details
- Date: 14 May 1995
- Official name: XXXVII Gran Premio Marlboro de España
- Location: Circuit de Catalunya, Montmeló, Catalonia, Spain
- Course: Permanent racing facility
- Course length: 4.727 km (2.937 miles)
- Distance: 65 laps, 307.114 km (190.832 miles)
- Weather: Sunny
- Attendance: 53,000

Pole position
Driver	(Germany) Michael Schumacher	Benetton-Renault
- Time: 1:21.452

Fastest lap
Driver	(United Kingdom) Damon Hill	Williams-Renault
- Time: 1:24.531 on lap 46

Podium
First	(Germany) Michael Schumacher	Benetton-Renault
Second	(United Kingdom) Johnny Herbert	Benetton-Renault
Third	(Austria) Gerhard Berger	Ferrari

The 1995 Spanish Grand Prix was a Formula One motor race held on 14 May 1995 at the Circuit de Catalunya, Montmeló. It was the fourth race of the 1995 Formula One season. Both Damon Hill and Rubens Barrichello experienced gearbox problems on the final lap, Hill dropping from 2nd (which would have kept him in the lead of the championship) to 4th, and Barrichello from 6th to 7th. This race marked the second and last one-two of Benetton, with Michael Schumacher and Johnny Herbert (and the first since 1990 Japanese Grand Prix, with the Brazilian drivers Nelson Piquet and Roberto Moreno), and the last Grand Prix start of 1992 World Champion Nigel Mansell who would leave the McLaren team after experiencing two difficult races when driving for the team.

== Summary ==
The green light failed to illuminate at the start, leaving the start to be indicated only by the red lights being turned off. Michael Schumacher led from start to finish on a two stop strategy. His team mate Johnny Herbert left the pits with the rear jack attached to his car, while Bertrand Gachot suffered a small refuelling fire when pulling away from his second stop.

Mansell's poor spell with the McLaren team came to an end when he retired the MP4/10 in the pits when already well down the order, complaining of poor handling. On the last lap Hill, lying second, suffered a hydraulic problem which saw him crawl across the line in fourth. This allowed Herbert to finish second, his best finish to date and his first ever podium finish. Barrichello had a similar problem losing sixth to Panis – both incidents were unseen by the TV coverage.

== Classification ==
=== Qualifying ===
Pos	No	Driver	Constructor	Q1	Q2	Gap
1	1	(Germany) Michael Schumacher	Benetton-Renault	1:23.535	1:21.452	—
2	27	(France) Jean Alesi	Ferrari	1:23.104	1:22.052	+0.600
3	28	(Austria) Gerhard Berger	Ferrari	1:23.458	1:22.071	+0.619
4	6	(United Kingdom) David Coulthard	Williams-Renault	1:23.496	1:22.332	+0.880
5	5	(United Kingdom) Damon Hill	Williams-Renault	1:24.356	1:22.349	+0.897
6	15	(United Kingdom) Eddie Irvine	Jordan-Peugeot	1:24.891	1:23.352	+1.900
7	2	(United Kingdom) Johnny Herbert	Benetton-Renault	1:24.461	1:23.536	+2.084
8	14	(Brazil) Rubens Barrichello	Jordan-Peugeot	1:26.413	1:23.705	+2.253
9	8	(Finland) Mika Häkkinen	McLaren-Mercedes	1:24.427	1:23.833	+2.381
10	7	(United Kingdom) Nigel Mansell	McLaren-Mercedes	1:26.246	1:23.927	+2.475
11	25	(United Kingdom) Martin Brundle	Ligier-Mugen-Honda	1:26.747	1:24.727	+3.275
12	30	(Germany) Heinz-Harald Frentzen	Sauber-Ford	1:25.655	1:24.802	+3.350
13	4	(Finland) Mika Salo	Tyrrell-Yamaha	1:26.462	1:24.971	+3.519
14	9	(Italy) Gianni Morbidelli	Footwork-Hart	1:27.280	1:25.053	+3.601
15	26	(France) Olivier Panis	Ligier-Mugen-Honda	1:25.902	1:25.204	+3.752
16	12	(Netherlands) Jos Verstappen	Simtek-Ford	1:27.666	1:25.827	+4.375
17	3	(Japan) Ukyo Katayama	Tyrrell-Yamaha	1:26.033	1:25.946	+4.494
18	10	(Japan) Taki Inoue	Footwork-Hart	1:26.846	1:26.059	+4.607
19	23	(Italy) Pierluigi Martini	Minardi-Ford	1:28.008	1:26.619	+5.167
20	29	(Austria) Karl Wendlinger	Sauber-Ford	1:28.305	1:27.007	+5.555
21	24	(Italy) Luca Badoer	Minardi-Ford	1:28.563	1:27.345	+5.893
22	11	(Italy) Domenico Schiattarella	Simtek-Ford	1:28.312	1:27.575	+6.123
23	17	(Italy) Andrea Montermini	Pacific-Ford	1:29.942	1:28.094	+6.642
24	16	(France) Bertrand Gachot	Pacific-Ford	1:30.429	1:28.598	+7.146
25	22	(Brazil) Roberto Moreno	Forti-Ford	1:31.063	1:28.963	+7.511
26	21	(Brazil) Pedro Diniz	Forti-Ford	1:30.578	1:29.540	+8.088

=== Race ===
Pos	No	Driver	Constructor	Laps	Time/Retired	Grid	Points
1	1	(Germany) Michael Schumacher	Benetton-Renault	65	1:34:20.507	1	10
2	2	(United Kingdom) Johnny Herbert	Benetton-Renault	65	+51.988	7	6
3	28	(Austria) Gerhard Berger	Ferrari	65	+1:05.237	3	4
4	5	(United Kingdom) Damon Hill	Williams-Renault	65	+2:01.749	5	3
5	15	(United Kingdom) Eddie Irvine	Jordan-Peugeot	64	+1 lap	6	2
6	26	(France) Olivier Panis	Ligier-Mugen-Honda	64	+1 lap	15	1
7	14	(Brazil) Rubens Barrichello	Jordan-Peugeot	64	+1 lap	8	
8	30	(Germany) Heinz-Harald Frentzen	Sauber-Ford	64	+1 lap	12	
9	25	(United Kingdom) Martin Brundle	Ligier-Mugen-Honda	64	+1 lap	11	
10	4	(Finland) Mika Salo	Tyrrell-Yamaha	64	+1 lap	13	
11	9	(Italy) Gianni Morbidelli	Footwork-Hart	63	+2 laps	14	
12	12	(Netherlands) Jos Verstappen	Simtek-Ford	63	+2 laps	16	
13	29	(Austria) Karl Wendlinger	Sauber-Ford	63	+2 laps	20	
14	23	(Italy) Pierluigi Martini	Minardi-Ford	62	+3 laps	19	
15	11	(Italy) Domenico Schiattarella	Simtek-Ford	61	+4 laps	22	
Ret	3	(Japan) Ukyo Katayama	Tyrrell-Yamaha	56	Engine	17	
Ret	6	(United Kingdom) David Coulthard	Williams-Renault	54	Gearbox	4	
Ret	8	(Finland) Mika Häkkinen	McLaren-Mercedes	53	Fuel system	9	
Ret	10	(Japan) Taki Inoue	Footwork-Hart	43	Transmission	18	
Ret	16	(France) Bertrand Gachot	Pacific-Ford	43	Fire	24	
Ret	22	(Brazil) Roberto Moreno	Forti-Ford	39	Overheating	25	
Ret	27	(France) Jean Alesi	Ferrari	25	Engine	2	
Ret	24	(Italy) Luca Badoer	Minardi-Ford	21	Gearbox	21	
Ret	7	(United Kingdom) Nigel Mansell	McLaren-Mercedes	18	Handling	10	
Ret	21	(Brazil) Pedro Diniz	Forti-Ford	17	Gearbox	26	
DNS	17	(Italy) Andrea Montermini	Pacific-Ford	0	Non-starter	23	

== Championship standings after the race ==
Drivers' Championship standings

Pos	Driver	Points
1	(Germany) Michael Schumacher	24
2	(United Kingdom) Damon Hill	23
3	(France) Jean Alesi	14
4	(Austria) Gerhard Berger	13
5	(United Kingdom) David Coulthard	9

Constructors' Championship standings

Pos	Constructor	Points
1	(Italy) Ferrari	27
2	(United Kingdom) Williams-Renault	26
3	(United Kingdom) Benetton-Renault	23
4	(United Kingdom) McLaren-Mercedes	6
5	(Switzerland) Sauber-Ford	3

- Note: Only the top five positions are included for both sets of standings.

Previous race: 1995 San Marino Grand Prix	FIA Formula One World Championship; 1995 season	Next race: 1995 Monaco Grand Prix
Previous race: 1994 Spanish Grand Prix	Spanish Grand Prix	Next race: 1996 Spanish Grand Prix
