= 1995 Argentine Grand Prix =

Race 2 of 17 in the 1995 Formula One World Championship
← Previous race	Next race →

Race details
- Date: 9 April 1995
- Official name: XVIII Gran Premio Marlboro de la Republica Argentina
- Location: Autódromo Oscar Alfredo Gálvez; Buenos Aires, Argentina
- Course: Permanent racing facility
- Course length: 4.259 km (2.646 miles)
- Distance: 72 laps, 306.482 km (190.439 miles)
- Weather: Cloudy

Pole position
Driver	(United Kingdom) David Coulthard	Williams-Renault
- Time: 1:53.241

Fastest lap
Driver	(Germany) Michael Schumacher	Benetton-Renault
- Time: 1:30.522 on lap 55

Podium
First	(United Kingdom) Damon Hill	Williams-Renault
Second	(France) Jean Alesi	Ferrari
Third	(Germany) Michael Schumacher	Benetton-Renault

The 1995 Argentine Grand Prix (formally the XVIII Gran Premio Marlboro de la Republica Argentina) was a Formula One motor race held on 9 April 1995 at the Autódromo Oscar Alfredo Gálvez, Buenos Aires, Argentina. It was the second race of the 1995 Formula One World Championship and the first running of the Argentine Grand Prix since 1981.

The 72-lap race was won by Damon Hill, driving a Williams-Renault, after starting from second position. Jean Alesi was second in a Ferrari, with Michael Schumacher third in a Benetton-Renault. Hill's teammate, David Coulthard, took the first pole position of his F1 career before retiring with an electrical failure.

== Report ==
=== Background ===
This was the first running of the Argentine Grand Prix since 1981. The race had been removed from the Formula One calendar due to the retirement of Carlos Reutemann and Argentina's invasion of the Falkland Islands, before being reinstated following President Carlos Menem's rise to power in 1989 and the subsequent modernisation of the Autódromo Oscar Alfredo Gálvez.

The No. 6 configuration of the circuit was to be used - the race having previously used the No. 2 and No. 9 configurations, as well as the long and fast No. 15 configuration. To celebrate the race's return, Reutemann drove a demonstration lap of the circuit aboard the 1994 Ferrari 412 T1 on the Thursday afternoon before the race. The track, however, was criticised due to its "dirtiness".

In the two weeks between the Brazilian and Argentine Grands Prix, the FIA rescinded the rule requiring that holes be cut in the airboxes; consequently, all the cars arrived at the circuit with their airbox holes filled.

=== Practice and qualifying ===
As the No. 6 configuration of the circuit was new to the Formula One calendar, a familiarisation session was held on the Thursday. The first practice session proper was held on Friday morning, followed in the afternoon by the first one-hour qualifying session. On Saturday, the second practice session was held, followed by the second qualifying session.

Both qualifying session took place in wet conditions, with several drivers spinning; only towards the end of the Saturday session did the conditions improve. David Coulthard took the first pole position of his F1 career, with a time of 1:53.241 in his Williams. Teammate Damon Hill was alongside him on the front row of the grid, despite his time being 0.8 seconds slower, with Michael Schumacher third in the Benetton. Eddie Irvine took fourth in the Jordan, followed by Mika Häkkinen in the McLaren, Jean Alesi in the Ferrari, and Mika Salo in the Tyrrell. The top ten was completed by Gerhard Berger in the second Ferrari, Heinz-Harald Frentzen in the Sauber and Rubens Barrichello in the second Jordan. The Simteks impressed with Jos Verstappen taking 14th, ahead of Mark Blundell in the second McLaren and both Ligiers, and Domenico Schiattarella 20th.

=== Race ===
In dry conditions and with President Menem in attendance, Coulthard led away while, behind him, Alesi spun on the inside of the first corner. Salo, braking to avoid Alesi, was hit from behind by Luca Badoer's Minardi, causing him to run into the side of the second Benetton of Johnny Herbert. In turn, Herbert hit Barrichello, as did Badoer, with the second Tyrrell of Ukyo Katayama also becoming involved. Behind them, Olivier Panis in the Ligier hit the back of Pierluigi Martini in the second Minardi. The race was red-flagged, and Alesi, Herbert, Barrichello, Katayama, Panis and Martini returned to the pits to take their teams' respective spare cars for the restart (meaning Badoer's weekend was over), while Salo's car was repaired on the grid.

On the second formation lap, Karl Wendlinger stalled his Sauber and was forced to start at the back of the grid. Coulthard again led away, while behind him there were more collisions: Häkkinen trod on Irvine's front wing on the run down to the first corner and retired immediately, while Wendlinger tangled with both Pacifics, putting all three out. Irvine made it back to the pits for a replacement nose, but retired on lap 7 when his engine failed.

Coulthard led until lap 6 when his throttle failed and restarted, allowing Schumacher and Hill past. Hill overtook Schumacher on lap 11 and led until making his first pit stop on lap 16. The recovering Coulthard passed Schumacher to take back the lead, only for his throttle to fail permanently almost immediately after. When Schumacher made his first stop, Alesi inherited the lead and held it for eight laps, before pitting himself. Behind them, Verstappen moved up to sixth in his Simtek, before suffering a long pit stop followed by a gearbox failure on lap 24.

After his stop, Alesi was nearly half a minute behind Hill, but ahead of Schumacher. Hill retained the lead for the rest of the race, though Alesi closed the gap to 6.4 seconds by the chequered flag. Despite setting the fastest lap of the race on lap 55, Schumacher finished 27 seconds behind Alesi, with teammate Herbert fourth. Salo was running fifth, close behind Herbert, when he collided with Aguri Suzuki in the second Ligier on lap 48; he angrily confronted the Japanese driver in the pit lane before telling the BBC that "drivers like Suzuki should not be in Formula One". Fifth thus went to Frentzen, with Berger picking up the final point for sixth. Following Verstappen's retirement, Schiattarella finished ninth to equal Simtek's best-ever result.

Berger's point kept him in the lead of the Drivers' Championship, pending the appeals to Schumacher and Coulthard's disqualifications from the Brazilian Grand Prix.

=== Post-race ===
Four days after the race, the FIA International Court of Appeal overturned the disqualifications from Brazil, meaning that Schumacher led the Drivers' Championship by four points from Hill with Berger dropping to fifth.

Meanwhile, in response to the criticism, the track was resurfaced over the winter of 1995–96, ready for the 1996 running of the race.

== Classification ==
=== Qualifying ===
Pos	No	Driver	Constructor	Q1 Time	Q2 Time	Gap
1	6	(United Kingdom) David Coulthard	Williams-Renault	1:54.670	1:53.241	
2	5	(United Kingdom) Damon Hill	Williams-Renault	1:55.677	1:54.057	+0.816
3	1	(Germany) Michael Schumacher	Benetton-Renault	1:57.056	1:54.272	+1.031
4	15	(United Kingdom) Eddie Irvine	Jordan-Peugeot	1:56.615	1:54.381	+1.140
5	8	(Finland) Mika Häkkinen	McLaren-Mercedes	1:56.449	1:54.529	+1.288
6	27	(France) Jean Alesi	Ferrari	1:55.213	1:54.637	+1.396
7	4	(Finland) Mika Salo	Tyrrell-Yamaha	1:57.738	1:54.757	+1.516
8	28	(Austria) Gerhard Berger	Ferrari	1:56.260	1:55.276	+2.035
9	30	(Germany) Heinz-Harald Frentzen	Sauber-Ford	1:55.583	1:56.168	+2.342
10	14	(Brazil) Rubens Barrichello	Jordan-Peugeot	1:56.746	1:56.114	+2.873
11	2	(United Kingdom) Johnny Herbert	Benetton-Renault	1:57.068	1:57.341	+3.827
12	9	(Italy) Gianni Morbidelli	Footwork-Hart	1:57.684	1:57.092	+3.851
13	24	(Italy) Luca Badoer	Minardi-Ford	1:57.167	1:57.657	+3.926
14	12	(Netherlands) Jos Verstappen	Simtek-Ford	2:02.410	1:57.231	+3.990
15	3	(Japan) Ukyo Katayama	Tyrrell-Yamaha	1:59.909	1:57.484	+4.243
16	23	(Italy) Pierluigi Martini	Minardi-Ford	1:58.066	2:01.059	+4.825
17	7	(United Kingdom) Mark Blundell	McLaren-Mercedes	1:58.660	1:58.767	+5.419
18	26	(France) Olivier Panis	Ligier-Mugen-Honda	1:59.204	1:58.824	+5.583
19	25	(Japan) Aguri Suzuki	Ligier-Mugen-Honda	2:01.446	1:58.882	+5.641
20	11	(Italy) Domenico Schiattarella	Simtek-Ford	2:02.806	1:59.539	+6.298
21	29	(Austria) Karl Wendlinger	Sauber-Ford	2:01.774	2:00.751	+7.510
22	17	(Italy) Andrea Montermini	Pacific-Ford	2:01.763	43:31.316	+8.522
23	16	(France) Bertrand Gachot	Pacific-Ford	2:04.050	2:09.359	+10.809
24	22	(Brazil) Roberto Moreno	Forti-Ford	2:04.481	2:15.398	+11.240
25	21	(Brazil) Pedro Diniz	Forti-Ford	2:05.932	no time	+12.691
26	10	(Japan) Taki Inoue	Footwork-Hart	2:07.298	no time	+14.057

=== Race ===
Pos	No	Driver	Constructor	Laps	Time/Retired	Grid	Points
1	5	(United Kingdom) Damon Hill	Williams-Renault	72	1:53:14.532	2	10
2	27	(France) Jean Alesi	Ferrari	72	+ 6.407	6	6
3	1	(Germany) Michael Schumacher	Benetton-Renault	72	+ 33.376	3	4
4	2	(United Kingdom) Johnny Herbert	Benetton-Renault	71	+ 1 Lap	11	3
5	30	(Germany) Heinz-Harald Frentzen	Sauber-Ford	70	+ 2 Laps	9	2
6	28	(Austria) Gerhard Berger	Ferrari	70	+ 2 Laps	8	1
7	26	(France) Olivier Panis	Ligier-Mugen-Honda	70	+ 2 Laps	18	
8	3	(Japan) Ukyo Katayama	Tyrrell-Yamaha	69	+ 3 Laps	15	
9	11	(Italy) Domenico Schiattarella	Simtek-Ford	68	+ 4 Laps	20	
NC	21	(Brazil) Pedro Diniz	Forti-Ford	63	+ 9 Laps	25	
NC	22	(Brazil) Roberto Moreno	Forti-Ford	63	+ 9 Laps	24	
Ret	4	(Finland) Mika Salo	Tyrrell-Yamaha	48	Collision	7	
Ret	25	(Japan) Aguri Suzuki	Ligier-Mugen-Honda	47	Collision	19	
Ret	23	(Italy) Pierluigi Martini	Minardi-Ford	44	Spun Off	16	
Ret	9	(Italy) Gianni Morbidelli	Footwork-Hart	43	Electrical	12	
Ret	10	(Japan) Taki Inoue	Footwork-Hart	40	Spun Off	26	
Ret	14	(Brazil) Rubens Barrichello	Jordan-Peugeot	33	Oil Pressure	10	
Ret	12	(Netherlands) Jos Verstappen	Simtek-Ford	23	Gearbox	14	
Ret	6	(United Kingdom) David Coulthard	Williams-Renault	16	Electrical	1	
Ret	7	(United Kingdom) Mark Blundell	McLaren-Mercedes	9	Engine	17	
Ret	15	(United Kingdom) Eddie Irvine	Jordan-Peugeot	6	Engine	4	
Ret	17	(Italy) Andrea Montermini	Pacific-Ford	1	Collision	22	
Ret	8	(Finland) Mika Häkkinen	McLaren-Mercedes	0	Collision	5	
Ret	16	(France) Bertrand Gachot	Pacific-Ford	0	Collision	23	
Ret	29	(Austria) Karl Wendlinger	Sauber-Ford	0	Collision	21	
DNS	24	(Italy) Luca Badoer	Minardi-Ford	0	Collision	13	

- The Forti drivers were not classified, as they did not complete 90% race distance, but they did not retire.
- Luca Badoer was involved in the first start crash. As his teammate took the spare car, he was unable to take the second start.

== Championship standings after the race ==
Drivers' Championship standings

Pos	Driver	Points
1	(Germany) Michael Schumacher	14
2	(United Kingdom) Damon Hill	10
3	(France) Jean Alesi	8
4	(United Kingdom) David Coulthard	6
5	(Austria) Gerhard Berger	5

Constructors' Championship standings

Pos	Constructor	Points
1	(Italy) Ferrari	13
2	(United Kingdom) Williams-Renault	10
3	(United Kingdom) Benetton-Renault	7
4	(United Kingdom) McLaren-Mercedes	4
5	(Switzerland) Sauber-Ford	2

- Note: Only the top five positions are included for both sets of standings.

Previous race: 1995 Brazilian Grand Prix	FIA Formula One World Championship; 1995 season	Next race: 1995 San Marino Grand Prix
Previous race: 1981 Argentine Grand Prix	Argentine Grand Prix	Next race: 1996 Argentine Grand Prix
