= Domenico Schiattarella =

Italian racing driver (born 1967)

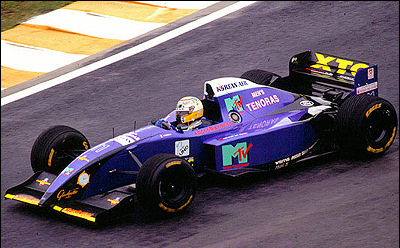
- Born: Domenico Luca Schiattarella; 17 November 1967 (age 59); Milan, Italy

Formula One World Championship career
- Nationality: (Italy) Italian
- Active years: 1994–1995
- Team: Simtek
- Entries: 7 (6 starts)
- Championships: 0
- Wins: 0
- Podiums: 0
- Career points: 0
- Pole positions: 0
- Fastest laps: 0
- First entry: 1994 European Grand Prix
- Last entry: 1995 Monaco Grand Prix

Champ Car career
- 5 races run over 3 years
- Years active: 1994–1995
- Best finish: 32nd (1998)
- First race: 1994 Molson Indy Toronto (Toronto)
- Last race: 1998 Toyota Grand Prix of Long Beach (Long Beach)
Wins	Podiums	Poles
0	0	0
- Statistics up to date as of July 25, 2019.

24 Hours of Le Mans career
- Years: 1999 – 2000
- Best finish: 6th (1999)
- Class wins: 0

NASCAR Whelen Euro Series career
- Debut season: 2015
- Former teams: Double T by MRT Nocentini
- Starts: 2
- Championships: 0
- Wins: 0
- Poles: 0
- Fastest laps: 0
- Best finish: 33rd in 2015
- Finished last season: 33rd in 2015

Championship titles
- 1987: Italian Formula 2000

Domenico Luca "Mimmo" Schiattarella (born 17 November 1967) is an Italian racing driver. He participated in seven Formula One Grands Prix for Simtek, debuting on October 16, 1994, and finishing when the team folded the next year. He scored no championship points, with a best finish of ninth in the 1995 Argentine Grand Prix.

Schiattarella has also participated in several CART races, Le Mans Series and American Le Mans Series events.

== Motorsports career results ==
=== Complete Formula One results ===
(key)

Year	Entrant	Chassis	Engine	1	2	3	4	5	6	7	8	9	10	11	12	13	14	15	16	17	WDC	Points
1994	MTV Simtek Ford	Simtek S941	Ford V8	BRA	PAC	SMR	MON	ESP	CAN	FRA	GBR	GER	HUN	BEL	ITA	POR	EUR; 19	JPN	AUS; Ret		NC	0
1995	MTV Simtek Ford	Simtek S951	Ford V8	BRA; Ret	ARG; 9	SMR; Ret	ESP; 15	MON; DNS	CAN	FRA	GBR	GER	HUN	BEL	ITA	POR	EUR	PAC	JPN	AUS	NC	0

=== American Open Wheel ===
(key)

==== CART ====
Year	Team	No.	1	2	3	4	5	6	7	8	9	10	11	12	13	14	15	16	17	18	19	Rank	Points	Ref
1994	Project Indy	64	SRF	PHX	LBH	INDY	MIL	DET	POR	CLE	TOR; 26	MIS	MDO; 16	NHM	VAN; Wth	ROA	NZR	LS				**42nd**	**0**	
1995	Project Indy	64	MIA	SRF	PHX	LBH	NZR	INDY	MIL	DET	POR	ROA	TOR	CLE	MIS	MDO	NHM	VAN; 18	LS; 21			**40th**	**0**	
1998	Project CART	15	MIA	MOT	LBH; 16	NZR	RIO	STL	MIL	DET	POR	CLE	TOR	MIS	MDO	ROA	VAN	LS	HOU	SRF	FON	**32nd**	**0**	

=== Complete FIA GT Championship results ===
(key)

Year	Team	Class	Car	Engine	1	2	3	4	5	6	7	8	9	10	11	Pos.	Points
1997	GBF UK Ltd.	GT1	Lotus GT1	Lotus Type-918 3.5 L Turbo V8	HOC; Ret	SIL; Ret	HEL; 13	NÜR; Ret	SPA	A1R; Ret	SUZ	DON; 12	MUG; Ret	SEB	LAG	NC	0
2001	Team Rafanelli	GT	Ferrari 550 Millennio	Ferrari F133 6.0 L V12	MNZ; Ret	BRN; 5	MAG; 4	SIL; 5	ZOL; Ret	HUN	SPA	A1R	NÜR	JAR	EST	22nd	7

=== Le Mans 24 Hours results ===
Year	Team	Co-drivers	Car	Class	Laps	Pos.	Class Pos.
1999	(France) Courage Compétition	(Italy) Alex Caffi (Italy) Andrea Montermini	Courage C52-Nissan	LMP	342	6th	6th
2000	(Italy) Team Rafanelli SRL	(Belgium) Didier de Radiguès (Italy) Emanuele Naspetti	Lola B2K/10-Judd	LMP900	154	DNF	DNF

=== Complete International Superstars Series/EuroV8 Series results ===
(key) (Races in bold indicate pole position) (Races in italics indicate fastest lap)

Year	Team	Car	1	2	3	4	5	6	7	8	9	10	11	12	13	14	15	16	DC	Points	Ref
2010	RGA Sportsmanship	BMW M3 (E92)	MNZ; 1; 9	MNZ; 2 Ret	IMO; 1	IMO; 2	ALG; 1	ALG; 2	HOC; 1	HOC; 2	CPR; 1	CPR; 2	VAL; 1	VAL; 2	KYA; 1	KYA; 2			28th	2	
2013	Solaris Motorsport	Chevrolet Lumina CR8	MNZ; 1	MNZ; 2	BRN; 1	BRN; 2	SVK; 1	SVK; 2	ZOL; 1; 11	ZOL; 2; 10	ALG; 1	ALG; 2	DON; 1 Ret	DON; 2; 7	IMO; 1	IMO; 2	VAL; 1; 6	VAL; 2 Ret	17th	17	
2014	Solaris Motorsport	Chevrolet Lumina CR8	MNZ; 1; 3	MNZ; 2; 3	VAL; 1	VAL; 2	MUG; 1; 3	MUG; 2; 3	BRN; 1	BRN; 2	SAC; 1	HOC; 1							10th	68	

=== NASCAR ===
(key) (Bold – Pole position awarded by qualifying time. Italics – Pole position earned by points standings or practice time. * – Most laps led.)

==== Whelen Euro Series - Elite 1 ====
NASCAR Whelen Euro Series - Elite 1 results
Year	Team	No.	Make	1	2	3	4	5	6	7	8	9	10	11	12	NWES	Pts	Ref
2015	Double T by MRT Nocentini	6	Chevy	VAL; 6	VAL; 21	VEN	VEN	BRH	BRH	TOU	TOU	UMB	UMB	ZOL	ZOL	33rd	61	
