= Pedro Diniz =

Brazilian racing driver (born 1970)

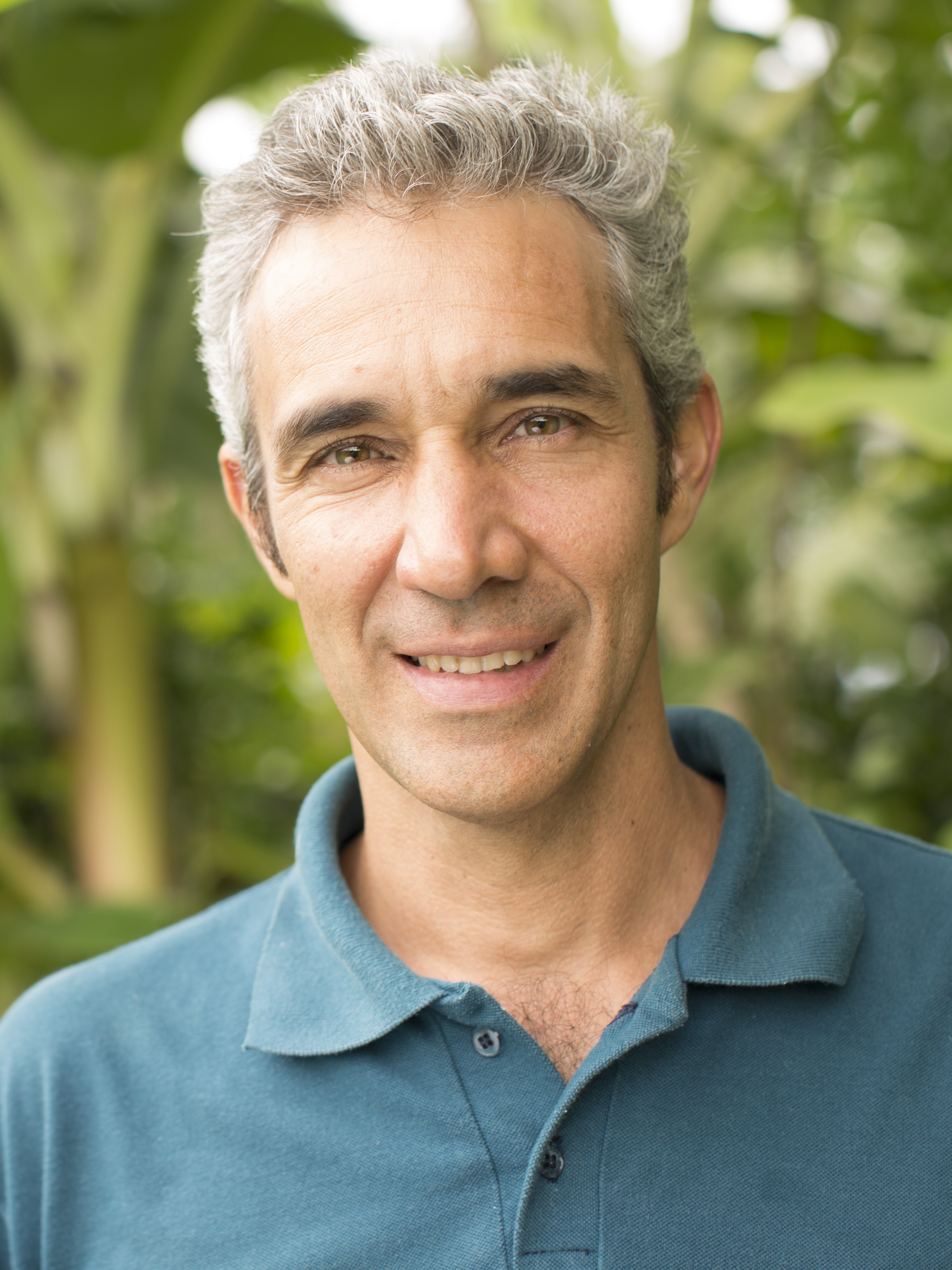
- Diniz in 2016
- Born: Pedro Paulo Falleiros dos Santos Diniz; 22 May 1970 (age 56); São Paulo, Brazil
- Spouse: Tatiana Floresti
- Children: 2

Formula One World Championship career
- Nationality: (Brazil) Brazilian
- Active years: 1995–2000
- Team(s): Forti, Ligier, Arrows, Sauber
- Entries: 99 (98 starts)
- Championships: 0
- Wins: 0
- Podiums: 0
- Career points: 10
- Pole positions: 0
- Fastest laps: 0
- First entry: 1995 Brazilian Grand Prix
- Last entry: 2000 Malaysian Grand Prix

Pedro Paulo Falleiros dos Santos Diniz (Portuguese pronunciation: [ˈpedɾu dʒiˈnis]; born 22 May 1970) is a Brazilian former racing driver, businessman and motorsport executive, who competed in Formula One from 1995 to 2000.

Born and raised in São Paulo, Diniz began karting aged 18 and achieved minor success, before progressing to car racing in the Brazilian Formula Ford Championship and the British Formula 3 Championship. He first drove in Formula One with Forti for the 1995 season. The following year he switched to Ligier and moved to Arrows for 1997. In 1998, he finished 14th in the Drivers' Championship, and subsequently moved to Sauber for 1999. He left Sauber after the 2000 season and bought a share in the Prost team, which folded a year later. Diniz was considered a pay driver during his career due to his family backing. He scored ten championship points during his six-year Formula One career.

Since leaving motorsport, Diniz founded the Formula Renault 2.0 Brazil Championship which he ran from 2002 and 2006, later becoming a partner in Pão de Açúcar and operates an organic produce and dairy farm alongside his (now ex) wife Tatiana Diniz. He is a board member of Food Tank, a non-profit organization that spotlights environmentally, socially, and economically sustainable ways of alleviating hunger, obesity, and poverty and works to create networks of people, organizations, and content to push for food system change.

== Early life and career ==
Diniz was born in São Paulo, Brazil, on 22 May 1970. His father was Abílio dos Santos Diniz, a businessman who used to own the Brazilian distribution chain Companhia Brasileira de Distribuição and the supermarket chain Pão de Açúcar. Diniz struggled to find a good education and went to several schools around the local area.

Diniz began karting at the age of eighteen, and his career was funded by his father who supported his son's hobby. He competed in several events around Brazil and his first racing success came when he won the Two Hours of São Paulo. Aged 19, Diniz moved up into car racing, competing in the Brazilian Formula Ford championship, where he finished ninth in the Drivers' Championship. In 1990, Diniz moved to the Alfa Reynard team and finished ninth overall, with his best performances being a podium position at Interlagos.

For 1991, Diniz moved to the British Formula 3 with the West Surrey Racing team, finishing 11th overall. He moved to the Edenbridge Racing team in 1992, driving a Reynard Mugen and took two podiums en route to eighth place overall.

== Formula One career ==
=== Forti (1995) ===
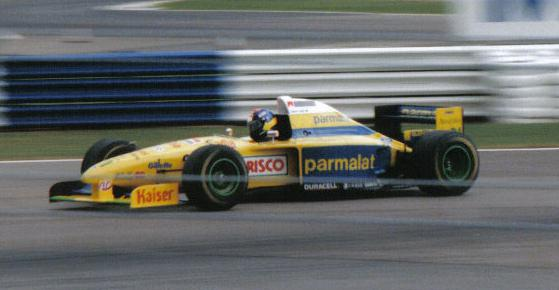
Diniz at the 1995 British Grand Prix

Diniz entered Formula One, the highest category of circuit racing defined by the Fédération Internationale de l'Automobile (FIA), motorsport's world governing body, with the Forti team, as team-mate to Roberto Moreno in 1995. In addition, this was the first of a three-year contract with Diniz and his backers. Despite his lack of success in F3000, he was guaranteed a seat as his family and sponsors were paying a significant amount of the team's budget. Furthermore, retired driver René Arnoux was employed as a consultant and driver coach for Diniz. The season started with Diniz scoring three consecutive finishes, albeit outside of the points scoring positions—but was not classified for the races in Argentina and San Marino. He did not finish the next race in Spain due to a gearbox problem and finished tenth in Monaco. Diniz retired from the next five races he entered, primarily from car issues and spun off into retirement at Magny-Cours. He subsequently finished every remaining race of the season, apart from the Grand Prix held at Suzuka where he spun off. He finished the season scoring no points and was unclassified in the Drivers' Championship. Diniz's good finishing record enabled him to establish himself as a steady, dependable driver. In December, Diniz signed for the Ligier team for 1996, despite team owner Tom Walkinshaw initially refusing to hold talks with the Brazilian driver. Ligier eventually signed Diniz after a shootout test session against other drivers in which Diniz was the fastest, also impressing the team with his approach and technical feedback. At the end of the season, Diniz and his sponsors were described as "throwing their money away" on the uncompetitive Forti. But the more significant impact of his first year in F1 was that the Brazilian had done nothing to assuage critics who had said he was a "pay driver". It took him several years to prove that he was not just in the sport because of his funding.

=== Ligier (1996) ===
Diniz started the season by finishing outside of the points in the opening two races—tenth in Australia and eighth in Brazil. At the Argentine Grand Prix, his car burst into flames after a pit-stop due to its fuel valve sticking open; British newspaper The Sun famously printed the photo alongside the headline "Diniz in the Oven". After failing to finish at Monaco, a race which his teammate Olivier Panis won, Diniz scored his first career point with a sixth-place finish at Catalunya. Six straight retirements followed before he scored another sixth-place finish at Monza. Following his poor season with Forti in 1995 little was expected of him for 1996, so there was mild surprise when he managed to out-qualify the better rated Panis at Hockenheim and establish himself as a driver capable of scoring points. He finished the season 15th in the Drivers' Championship with two points, six places and 11 points behind Panis.

After the season concluded, it was announced that Diniz would leave Ligier for the Arrows team for 1997, partnering reigning World Champion Damon Hill. An important factor was the amount of sponsorship Diniz brought to Arrows, estimated to be worth $13 million.

=== Arrows (1997–1998) ===
1997

For 1997, Diniz was confident heading into the season and his decision to join Arrows, saying: "The all-round strength of the package Tom [Walkinshaw] has put together for 1997 made the decision very easy for me". Diniz started his season with a finish in Australia (although he was given dispensation to start despite falling outside the 107% qualifying time) and later suffered from consecutive retirements in the next five races. He managed to finish eighth in Canada, before picking up further consecutive retirements in the next four races. Diniz managed to secure a seventh-place finish in Belgium, however he had been running in an excellent third place before a problem at his first pit stop dropped him out of contention. Diniz suffering a further retirement in Italy, however he managed to secure finishes in the next three consecutive races, which included a points scoring finish at the Luxembourg Grand Prix and retired from the final race of the season at the European Grand Prix. Diniz's reputation grew throughout the season from a mere pay driver to a genuine racing driver, he managed to out-qualify teammate Hill in Belgium and Japan, two of the most technically challenging tracks on the calendar, also having a number of strong race performances. In October, Arrows announced that Diniz had signed a one-year extension to his contract, remaining with the team for 1998. Diniz finished the season in sixteenth place in the Drivers' Championship, with two points, and finished four places behind team-mate Hill.

1998

Diniz remained at Arrows for 1998, partnered by Mika Salo. Diniz endured a torrid start: his car suffered gearbox problems in the opening three rounds and endured engine failures in the races at San Marino and Spain. He scored his first point of the season with a sixth-place finish in Monaco and managed to finish the races in Canada and France. Diniz suffered three more consecutive retirements, and finished the races in Hungary and Belgium, in eleventh and fifth respectively. Diniz finished the season by retiring in the final three races. He finished 14th in the Drivers' Championship, and was tied on points with team-mate Salo.

At the end of the season, Diniz became embroiled in a contract dispute. On 12 October, Diniz chose to leave Arrows and signed a contract to join Sauber, having been previously linked to a seat at BAR. Arrows, however, insisted that they had the right to exercise their option to keep Diniz. Diniz argued that the Arrows option contained a clause allowing him to leave if Arrows did not deliver performances required by the driver. The dispute went to Formula One's Contract Recognition Board, who ruled in favour of Diniz on 22 February. Arrows later sued Diniz for £4 million, for breach of contract. The case was later heard by the Commercial High Court in London in February 2001 and ruled that Arrows owner Tom Walkinshaw pay Diniz £500,000 in compensation. Arrows later applied for an appeal against the decision, and the Court of Appeal ruled in Diniz's favour in February 2002.

=== Sauber (1999–2000) ===
1999

For 1999, Diniz partnered experienced driver Jean Alesi at Sauber. He endured a torrid start: He was forced into retirement in the first five races held in the season; and in the sixth race of the season held in Canada, he managed to score his first point of the season with a sixth-place finish. Diniz suffered a retirement at the next round in France, before clinching consecutive sixth-place finishes in the next two races and later suffered further consecutive retirements in the following six races. In late August, it was announced that Diniz would remain at Sauber for 2000. At the European Grand Prix, Diniz was hit by Benetton driver Alexander Wurz who sent the Sauber driver into a barrel roll and suffered a bruised knee and shoulder, resulting from his car's roll hoop becoming damaged. The season was somewhat of a disappointment for both the team and the driver, however although Diniz only finished four races all season he scored points in three of them. Diniz finished the season fourteenth in the Drivers' Championship and scored three points.

2000

Diniz at the 2000 Canadian Grand Prix

For 2000, Diniz again competed with Sauber and was partnered with Mika Salo. Team principal Peter Sauber stated Diniz and Salo would have equal status and that the former would use his experience over the upcoming season.

Diniz started off the season by retiring with transmission problems in Australia. He, along with Salo, were forced to withdraw from the Brazilian Grand Prix due to potentially dangerous wing failures during the weekend. He managed to finish in the next two races—eighth in San Marino and eleventh at the British Grand Prix—which was followed by a retirement at the Spanish Grand Prix due to a spin on the first lap. He was involved in a collision with Giancarlo Fisichella's Benetton in Austria for which he received a stop-go penalty, and in Germany, Diniz collided with Prost driver Jean Alesi forcing both drivers to retire. Diniz finished the year scoring no points and was unclassified in the Drivers' Championship.

Diniz became unhappy at Sauber over a test session shoot out at Mugello against fellow countryman Enrique Bernoldi. He held talks with the Prost and Sauber teams during October, and could not find a race seat with either team. Diniz decided to withdraw from active motorsport and his family purchased a 40 percent stake of the Prost team for $10 million and took a management role within the team.

== Post-Formula One ==
In late 2001, the Diniz family sought to purchase the remaining stake in the Prost team, but negotiations with team principal Alain Prost resulted in no agreement. Diniz formally left the team in November as his relationship with Prost had deteriorated.

Diniz announced the creation of a new racing series, the Formula Renault 2.0 Brazil Championship in November 2001. Diniz was a partner of the Wonder Inn, Fernando de Noronha between July 2003 and May 2009. He subsequently became a partner in his father's supermarket chain and operates an organic produce and dairy farm. He married Tatiana who works alongside Diniz and has two children.

Alongside his organic produce farm, Diniz founded Instituto Toca, a non-profit school and research initiative for sustainability. He is currently on the board of Peninsula Participações.

== Racing record ==
=== Career summary ===
Season	Series	Team	Races	Poles	Wins	F/Laps	Podiums	Points	Position
1988	Two hours of São Paulo	?	1	?	1	?	1	N/A	**1st**
1989	Brazilian Formula Ford 1600	?	11	?	0	?	?	0	6th
1990	Formula 3 Sudamericana	Daacar	12	0	0	1	1	4	15th
1991	British Formula 3 Championship	West Surrey Racing	14	0	0	0	0	1	12th
1992	British Formula 3 Championship	Edenbridge Racing	15	0	0	0	2	8	12th
1992	Masters of Formula 3	Edenbridge Racing	1	0	0	0	0	0	20th
1992	British Formula 3000	Edenbridge Racing	1	0	0	0	0	0	NC
1993	International Formula 3000	Forti Corse	8	0	0	0	0	0	NC
1993	Formula 3 Sudamericana	?	1	0	0	0	0	0	NC
1994	International Formula 3000	Forti Corse	8	0	0	0	0	3	12th
1995	Formula One	Parmalat Forti Ford	17	0	0	0	0	0	NC
1996	Formula One	Ligier Gauloises Blondes	16	0	0	0	0	2	15th
1997	Formula One	Danka Arrows Yamaha	17	0	0	0	0	2	16th
1998	Formula One	Danka Zepter Arrows	16	0	0	0	0	3	14th
1999	Formula One	Red Bull Sauber Petronas	16	0	0	0	0	3	14th
2000	Formula One	Red Bull Sauber Petronas	16	0	0	0	0	0	NC

=== Complete British Formula Three Championship results ===
(key) (Races in bold indicate pole position) (Races in italics indicate fastest lap)

Year	Entrant	Chassis	Engine	Class	1	2	3	4	5	6	7	8	9	10	11	12	13	14	15	16	DC	Points
1991	West Surrey Racing	Ralt RT35	Mugen-Honda	A	SIL; 6	THR; Ret	DON; DNS	BRH; Ret	BRH; 7	THR; Ret	SIL; 8	DON; 8	SIL; DSQ	SIL; 8	SNE; 9	SIL; Ret	BRH; Ret	DON; Ret	SIL	THR	12th	1
1992	Edenbridge Racing	Reynard 923	Mugen-Honda	A	DON; Ret	SIL; 14	THR; 3	BRH; 3	THR; Ret	BRH; Ret	SIL; DNS	SIL; 10									12th	8
1992	Edenbridge Racing	Ralt RT36	Mugen-Honda	A									DON; Ret	SNE; Ret	SIL; Ret	PEM; Ret	SIL; Ret	DON; 8	THR; 8	SIL; 11	12th	8

=== Complete International Formula 3000 results ===
(key) (Races in bold indicate pole position) (Races in italics indicate fastest lap)

Year	Entrant	1	2	3	4	5	6	7	8	9	DC	Points
1993	Forti Corse	DON; Ret	SIL; Ret	PAU; DNQ	PER; 7	HOC; Ret	NÜR; 16	SPA; 14	MAG; 11	NOG; 14	NC	0
1994	Forti Corse	SIL; Ret	PAU; Ret	CAT; 10	PER; Ret	HOC; Ret	SPA; 9	EST; 4	MAG; Ret		13th	3

=== Complete Formula One results ===
(key)

Year	Entrant	Chassis	Engine	1	2	3	4	5	6	7	8	9	10	11	12	13	14	15	16	17	WDC	Points
1995	Parmalat Forti Ford	Forti FG01	Ford EDB 3.0 V8	BRA; 10	ARG; NC	SMR; NC	ESP; Ret	MON; 10	CAN; Ret	FRA; Ret	GBR; Ret	GER; Ret	HUN; Ret	BEL; 13	ITA; 9	POR; 16	EUR; 13	PAC; 17	JPN; Ret	AUS; 7	NC	0
1996	Équipe Ligier Gauloises Blondes	Ligier JS43	Mugen Honda MF301HA 3.0 V10	AUS; 10	BRA; 8	ARG; Ret	EUR; 10	SMR; 7	MON; Ret	ESP; 6	CAN; Ret	FRA; Ret	GBR; Ret	GER; Ret	HUN; Ret	BEL; Ret	ITA; 6	POR; Ret	JPN; Ret		15th	2
1997	Danka Arrows Yamaha	Arrows A18	Yamaha OX11A 3.0 V10	AUS; 10	BRA; Ret	ARG; Ret	SMR; Ret	MON; Ret	ESP; Ret	CAN; 8	FRA; Ret	GBR; Ret	GER; Ret	HUN; Ret	BEL; 7	ITA; Ret	AUT; 13^{†}	LUX; 5	JPN; 12	EUR; Ret	16th	2
1998	Danka Zepter Arrows	Arrows A19	Arrows T2-F1 3.0 V10	AUS; Ret	BRA; Ret	ARG; Ret	SMR; Ret	ESP; Ret	MON; 6	CAN; 9	FRA; 14	GBR; Ret	AUT; Ret	GER; Ret	HUN; 11	BEL; 5	ITA; Ret	LUX; Ret	JPN; Ret		14th	3
1999	Red Bull Sauber Petronas	Sauber C18	Petronas SPE-03A 3.0 V10	AUS; Ret	BRA; Ret	SMR; Ret	MON; Ret	ESP; Ret	CAN; 6	FRA; Ret	GBR; 6	AUT; 6	GER; Ret	HUN; Ret	BEL; Ret	ITA; Ret	EUR; Ret	MAL; Ret	JPN; 11		14th	3
2000	Red Bull Sauber Petronas	Sauber C19	Petronas SPE 04A 3.0 V10	AUS; Ret	BRA; DNS	SMR; 8	GBR; 11	ESP; Ret	EUR; 7	MON; Ret	CAN; 10	FRA; 11	AUT; 9	GER; Ret	HUN; Ret	BEL; 11	ITA; 8	USA; 8	JPN; 11	MAL; Ret	NC	0

^{†} Did not finish, but was classified as he had completed more than 90% of the race distance.
