= 1994 Australian Grand Prix =

Sixteenth round of the 1994 Formula One World Championship

Race 16 of 16 in the 1994 Formula One World Championship
← Previous race	Next race →

Race details
- Date: 13 November 1994
- Official name: LIX Adelaide Australian Grand Prix
- Location: Adelaide Street Circuit; Adelaide, South Australia, Australia
- Course: Temporary street circuit
- Course length: 3.780 km (2.362 miles)
- Distance: 81 laps, 306.180 km (191.362 miles)
- Weather: Sunny with clouds
- Attendance: 132,000

Pole position
Driver	(United Kingdom) Nigel Mansell	Williams-Renault
- Time: 1:16.179

Fastest lap
Driver	(Germany) Michael Schumacher	Benetton-Ford
- Time: 1:17.140 on lap 29

Podium
First	(United Kingdom) Nigel Mansell	Williams-Renault
Second	(Austria) Gerhard Berger	Ferrari
Third	(United Kingdom) Martin Brundle	McLaren-Peugeot

The 1994 Australian Grand Prix (formally the LIX Adelaide Australian Grand Prix) was a Formula One motor race held on 13 November 1994 at the Adelaide Street Circuit. It was the sixteenth and final race of the 1994 Formula One World Championship. The 81-lap race was won by Nigel Mansell driving for the Williams team after starting from pole position. This event was the latest one where a Formula One driver won a race over the age of 40 until 2026, when Lewis Hamilton won at the 2026 Barcelona-Catalunya Grand Prix. Gerhard Berger finished second in a Ferrari car with Martin Brundle third for the McLaren team.

The race is remembered, besides being the closing of one of the most tragic seasons in the history of the category, also for an incident involving the two title contenders Damon Hill and Michael Schumacher which forced both to retire and resulted in Schumacher winning the World Drivers' Championship. Also notable was the last appearance in a Formula One Grand Prix of the first incarnation of Team Lotus, previously seven-time Constructors' Champions. It was also the 31st and last Grand Prix victory of Nigel Mansell's Formula One career, as well as his last podium finish in his last race for Williams. As of 2026, this was the last Formula One race where the number of entrants exceeded the number of places on the starting grid. This would also prove to be the last Grand Prix for Christian Fittipaldi, Franck Lagorce, Michele Alboreto, Hideki Noda, David Brabham, JJ Lehto, Paul Belmondo and the Larrousse team.

== Report ==
=== Background ===
Heading into the final race of the season, Benetton driver Michael Schumacher was leading the Drivers' Championship with 92 points; Williams driver Damon Hill was second on 91 points, one point behind Schumacher. Williams led the Constructors' Championship with 108 points, while Benetton were 5 points behind with 103. Thus, both titles were still at stake, and they would be determined in the final round.

=== Race ===
Schumacher took the lead at the start, with Hill second behind him. The order between the two remained the same until lap 36. Hill was catching Schumacher when the Benetton driver went off the track at the East Terrace corner, hitting a wall with his right side wheels before pulling back onto the track. Hill had rounded the fifth corner of the track when Schumacher pulled across the track ahead of him to the left. At the next corner, Hill attempted to pass Schumacher but the two collided when Schumacher turned in. Schumacher was eliminated on the spot. Hill attempted to continue the race and pitted immediately, but retired from the race with irreparable damage to the car's front left suspension wishbone. As neither driver scored, Schumacher took the title.

After Schumacher and Hill retired, Nigel Mansell took the lead of the race. Mansell stayed in the lead until he made his second pit stop. After Mansell pitted, Berger took the lead and stayed in the lead after his second pit stop. On lap 64, Mansell overtook Berger to retake the lead of the race. Mika Häkkinen was running 5th in the closing stages behind teammate Brundle and Barrichello until his brakes failed on lap 77, sending him off into the wall backwards into retirement but was classified 12th. Mansell stayed in the lead for the rest of the race to win, with Berger finishing second and Brundle finishing third ahead of Barrichello, Panis, and Jean Alesi in the other Ferrari completing the top 6. Mansell's victory was first time a driver over the age of 40 had won a Formula One race since Jack Brabham in 1970. Mansell's victory would remain the last driver to win a Formula One Grand Prix over the age of 40 until Lewis Hamilton won the 2026 Barcelona-Catalunya Grand Prix.

=== Post-race ===
Schumacher was blamed for the incident by many Formula One insiders despite having won the Championship. After investigation, the race stewards judged it as a racing incident and took no action against Schumacher. At age 25, Schumacher was Germany's first Formula One World Drivers' Champion (given that Jochen Rindt, posthumous 1970 World's Champion, competed for Austria, his adoptive country), albeit under highly controversial circumstances. Schumacher always maintained that the collision was a racing incident, a view that met with a large degree of media cynicism, particularly in the United Kingdom. Schumacher has been blamed by the United Kingdom public for the incident. In 2003, the BBC conducted a search for "The Most Unsporting Moment" in which the Adelaide incident was nominated. Hill's 1994 season earned him the 1994 BBC Sports Personality of the Year.

Although Hill deliberately avoided becoming involved in the outcry at the time, in later years he explicitly accused Schumacher of deliberately driving into him. Formula One commentator Murray Walker maintained that Schumacher did not cause the crash intentionally while his co-commentators for the race, former Formula One driver Jonathan Palmer and pit reporter Barry Sheene, both argued that the crash was entirely Schumacher's fault. Patrick Head of the Williams team stated to F1 Racing magazine that in 1994 "Williams were already 100% certain that Michael was guilty of foul play" but did not protest Schumacher's title because the team was still dealing with the death of Ayrton Senna, to whom Schumacher dedicated his title after his death in the San Marino Grand Prix earlier in the year.

== Classification ==
=== Qualifying ===
Pos	No	Driver	Constructor	Q1 Time	Q2 Time	Gap
1	2	(United Kingdom) Nigel Mansell	Williams-Renault	1:16.179	1:33.988	
2	5	(Germany) Michael Schumacher	Benetton-Ford	1:16.197	1:32.627	+0.018
3	0	(United Kingdom) Damon Hill	Williams-Renault	1:16.830	1:33.792	+0.651
4	7	(Finland) Mika Häkkinen	McLaren-Peugeot	1:16.992	1:35.432	+0.813
5	14	(Brazil) Rubens Barrichello	Jordan-Hart	1:17.537	1:37.610	+1.358
6	15	(United Kingdom) Eddie Irvine	Jordan-Hart	1:17.667	No time	+1.488
7	6	(United Kingdom) Johnny Herbert	Benetton-Ford	1:17.727	1:35.712	+1.548
8	27	(France) Jean Alesi	Ferrari	1:17.801	1:33.905	+1.622
9	8	(United Kingdom) Martin Brundle	McLaren-Peugeot	1:17.950	1:36.246	+1.771
10	30	(Germany) Heinz-Harald Frentzen	Sauber-Mercedes	1:17.962	1:35.623	+1.783
11	28	(Austria) Gerhard Berger	Ferrari	1:18.070	1:33.818	+1.891
12	26	(France) Olivier Panis	Ligier-Renault	1:18.072	1:36.222	+1.893
13	4	(United Kingdom) Mark Blundell	Tyrrell-Yamaha	1:18.237	1:35.462	+2.058
14	12	(Italy) Alessandro Zanardi	Lotus-Mugen-Honda	1:18.331	1:39.179	+2.152
15	3	(Japan) Ukyo Katayama	Tyrrell-Yamaha	1:18.411	1:36.628	+2.232
16	24	(Italy) Michele Alboreto	Minardi-Ford	1:18.755	1:36.498	+2.576
17	29	(Finland) JJ Lehto	Sauber-Mercedes	1:18.806	1:36.245	+2.627
18	23	(Italy) Pierluigi Martini	Minardi-Ford	1:18.957	1:36.257	+2.778
19	9	(Brazil) Christian Fittipaldi	Footwork-Ford	1:19.061	1:35.790	+2.882
20	25	(France) Franck Lagorce	Ligier-Renault	1:19.153	1:37.393	+2.974
21	10	(Italy) Gianni Morbidelli	Footwork-Ford	1:19.610	1:35.136	+3.431
22	11	(Finland) Mika Salo	Lotus-Mugen-Honda	1:19.844	1:43.071	+3.665
23	19	(Japan) Hideki Noda	Larrousse-Ford	1:20.145	1:47.569	+3.966
24	31	(Australia) David Brabham	Simtek-Ford	1:20.442	No time	+4.263
25	20	(Switzerland) Jean-Denis Délétraz	Larrousse-Ford	1:22.422	1:44.155	+6.243
26	32	(Italy) Domenico Schiattarella	Simtek-Ford	1:22.529	No time	+6.350
DNQ	33	(France) Paul Belmondo	Pacific-Ilmor	1:24.087	No time	+7.908
DNQ	34	(France) Bertrand Gachot	Pacific-Ilmor	7:40.317	No time	+6:24.138

=== Race ===
Pos	No	Driver	Constructor	Laps	Time/Retired	Grid	Points
1	2	(United Kingdom) Nigel Mansell	Williams-Renault	81	1:47:51.480	1	10
2	28	(Austria) Gerhard Berger	Ferrari	81	+ 2.511	11	6
3	8	(United Kingdom) Martin Brundle	McLaren-Peugeot	81	+ 52.487	9	4
4	14	(Brazil) Rubens Barrichello	Jordan-Hart	81	+ 1:10.530	5	3
5	26	(France) Olivier Panis	Ligier-Renault	80	+ 1 lap	12	2
6	27	(France) Jean Alesi	Ferrari	80	+ 1 lap	8	1
7	30	(Germany) Heinz-Harald Frentzen	Sauber-Mercedes	80	+ 1 lap	10	
8	9	(Brazil) Christian Fittipaldi	Footwork-Ford	80	+ 1 lap	19	
9	23	(Italy) Pierluigi Martini	Minardi-Ford	79	+ 2 laps	18	
10	29	(Finland) JJ Lehto	Sauber-Mercedes	79	+ 2 laps	17	
11	25	(France) Franck Lagorce	Ligier-Renault	79	+ 2 laps	20	
12	7	(Finland) Mika Häkkinen	McLaren-Peugeot	76	Brakes/Accident	4	
Ret	24	(Italy) Michele Alboreto	Minardi-Ford	69	Suspension	16	
Ret	4	(United Kingdom) Mark Blundell	Tyrrell-Yamaha	66	Collision	13	
Ret	20	(Switzerland) Jean-Denis Délétraz	Larrousse-Ford	56	Gearbox	25	
Ret	11	(Finland) Mika Salo	Lotus-Mugen-Honda	49	Electrical	22	
Ret	31	(Australia) David Brabham	Simtek-Ford	49	Engine	24	
Ret	12	(Italy) Alessandro Zanardi	Lotus-Mugen-Honda	40	Throttle	14	
Ret	0	(United Kingdom) Damon Hill	Williams-Renault	35	Collision damage	3	
Ret	5	(Germany) Michael Schumacher	Benetton-Ford	35	Collision	2	
Ret	32	(Italy) Domenico Schiattarella	Simtek-Ford	21	Gearbox	26	
Ret	3	(Japan) Ukyo Katayama	Tyrrell-Yamaha	19	Spun off	15	
Ret	19	(Japan) Hideki Noda	Larrousse-Ford	18	Oil leak	23	
Ret	10	(Italy) Gianni Morbidelli	Footwork-Ford	17	Oil leak	21	
Ret	15	(United Kingdom) Eddie Irvine	Jordan-Hart	15	Spun off	6	
Ret	6	(United Kingdom) Johnny Herbert	Benetton-Ford	13	Gearbox	7	

== Championship standings after the race ==
- **Bold text** indicates the World Champions.

Drivers' Championship standings

Pos	Driver	Points
1	(Germany) **Michael Schumacher**	92
2	(United Kingdom) Damon Hill	91
3	(Austria) Gerhard Berger	41
4	(Finland) Mika Häkkinen	26
5	(France) Jean Alesi	24

Constructors' Championship standings

Pos	Constructor	Points
1	(United Kingdom) **Williams-Renault**	118
2	(United Kingdom) Benetton-Ford	103
3	(Italy) Ferrari	71
4	(United Kingdom) McLaren-Peugeot	42
5	(Republic of Ireland) Jordan-Hart	28

Previous race: 1994 Japanese Grand Prix	FIA Formula One World Championship; 1994 season	Next race: 1995 Brazilian Grand Prix
Previous race: 1993 Australian Grand Prix	Australian Grand Prix	Next race: 1995 Australian Grand Prix
