= 1995 San Marino Grand Prix =

Race 3 of 17 in the 1995 Formula One World Championship
← Previous race	Next race →

Race details
- Date: 30 April 1995
- Official name: 15º Gran Premio di San Marino
- Location: Autodromo Enzo e Dino Ferrari, Imola, Emilia-Romagna, Italy
- Course: Permanent racing facility
- Course length: 4.895 km (3.059 miles)
- Distance: 63 laps, 308.385 km (192.740 miles)
- Weather: Heavy rain before the start, before brightening up

Pole position
Driver	(Germany) Michael Schumacher	Benetton-Renault
- Time: 1:27.274

Fastest lap
Driver	(Austria) Gerhard Berger	Ferrari
- Time: 1:29.568 on lap 57

Podium
First	(United Kingdom) Damon Hill	Williams-Renault
Second	(France) Jean Alesi	Ferrari
Third	(Austria) Gerhard Berger	Ferrari

The 1995 San Marino Grand Prix was a Formula One motor race held on 30 April 1995 at the Autodromo Enzo e Dino Ferrari, Imola. It was the third race of the 1995 Formula One season.

Following the deaths of Roland Ratzenberger and Ayrton Senna at Imola the previous year, the track was heavily modified for 1995. New chicanes were built at Tamburello and Villeneuve corners, Acque Minerali chicane was removed and replaced by a right-hand corner, Rivazza was eased and the final corner became a single chicane, rather than the 5th-gear sweep previously.

Williams-Renault driver Damon Hill scored an emotional victory at the track at which his teammate Senna died a year earlier, while the Ferraris of Jean Alesi and Gerhard Berger finished second and third respectively. Despite being teammates from 1993 to 1997, this was the only occasion Alesi and Berger shared a podium racing for the same team. This race was also the first for Nigel Mansell at McLaren and his first Grand Prix start overall since winning for Williams in Adelaide at the end of the previous season.

== Race report ==
Michael Schumacher secured pole position with his time on Friday, in an exciting qualifying session. David Coulthard had looked to have set the fastest time on Friday but it only lasted for a few seconds before it was snatched back by Schumacher. Moments later Gerhard Berger - who was on a stupendously fast lap in his Ferrari - screamed towards the start-finish line and looked set to send the local Ferrari fans into raptures. Berger came agonisingly close to securing pole position and a mere 0.008 seconds separated the Austrian's Ferrari from Schumacher's Benetton.

Berger's performance guaranteed massive crowds for the rest of the weekend but on Saturday the weather was hotter and the track a lot slower. None of the fast men improved. Nigel Mansell, making his return to F1 with McLaren, qualified ninth, three places down on teammate Häkkinen.

Before the race, all the drivers participated in a one-minute silence in the memory of Roland Ratzenberger and Ayrton Senna who had died a year earlier at the same track.

The weather took a turn on race day and Sunday morning was greeted with steady rain but the rain did not deter the fans and the hillsides of Imola were packed with the joyful Ferrari fans from dawn onwards. As the grid lined up teams had to decide whether to race on slick tyres or on wets. Six drivers chose wet tyres: the first five on the grid and Rubens Barrichello in 10th place. By the end of the first lap the men on wet tyres were lying 1-2-3-4-5-6 and everyone else was waiting for the track to dry. The drivers on wets gained about five seconds a lap on their rivals. Then they started coming in. Schumacher's race lasted only half a lap after his pit stop because, on the way up to the top of the circuit, the Benetton snapped suddenly to the right and hit the wall hard. It looked like a driver of a very sensitive car making a mistake on slicks in damp conditions, but Schumacher said it was a car problem.

With Schumacher out of the way Berger led Hill, Coulthard and Jean Alesi. The latter pair put on a good show, ducking and weaving as they dived through the backmarkers.

The fight became more significant when Berger's Ferrari stalled during his next pit stop. This left Hill in the lead with Coulthard and Alesi on his tail. During the exciting pit stop sequence Coulthard and Alesi brushed but the Williams team did not spot a damaged front wing. An over-eager Coulthard exceeded the speed-limit when exiting the pits, resulting in the Williams driver receiving a 10-second penalty. Unfortunately for Coulthard the rules meant that the Williams team would be unable to change his now obviously damaged front wing when he returned to the pits to serve his penalty and so had to make a third trip to the pits to replace his damaged front wing, by which time his race was ruined. There was nearly disaster for Hill when a refuelling hose stuck during his final pit stop but he managed to get out ahead of Alesi.

In the midfield the returning Mansell collided with Eddie Irvine in the Jordan and both had to pit. The race ended up being 1992 champion Mansell's last race finish.

Hill won, with Alesi and Berger coming second and third. Coulthard was fourth and Häkkinen fifth, the McLaren a lap down, while Heinz-Harald Frentzen gave Sauber another unexpected point by finishing sixth. The Ferrari fans and the team itself were left asking what might have been had Berger not stalled in the pits while he was involved in a titanic struggle with Hill.

== Classification ==
=== Qualifying ===
Pos	No	Driver	Constructor	Q1 Time	Q2 Time	Gap
1	1	(Germany) Michael Schumacher	Benetton-Renault	1:27.274	1:27.413	
2	28	(Austria) Gerhard Berger	Ferrari	1:27.282	1:38.801	+0.008
3	6	(United Kingdom) David Coulthard	Williams-Renault	1:27.459	1:27.600	+0.185
4	5	(United Kingdom) Damon Hill	Williams-Renault	1:27.537	1:27.512	+0.238
5	27	(France) Jean Alesi	Ferrari	1:27.813	1:28.431	+0.539
6	8	(Finland) Mika Häkkinen	McLaren-Mercedes	1:28.343	no time	+1.069
7	15	(United Kingdom) Eddie Irvine	Jordan-Peugeot	1:28.516	1:41.247	+1.242
8	2	(United Kingdom) Johnny Herbert	Benetton-Renault	1:29.403	1:29.350	+2.076
9	7	(United Kingdom) Nigel Mansell	McLaren-Mercedes	1:29.517	1:29.966	+2.243
10	14	(Brazil) Rubens Barrichello	Jordan-Peugeot	1:29.580	1:29.551	+2.277
11	9	(Italy) Gianni Morbidelli	Footwork-Hart	1:29.582	1:31.147	+2.308
12	26	(France) Olivier Panis	Ligier-Mugen-Honda	1:30.801	1:30.760	+3.486
13	4	(Finland) Mika Salo	Tyrrell-Yamaha	1:31.221	1:31.035	+3.761
14	30	(Germany) Heinz-Harald Frentzen	Sauber-Ford	1:31.358	1:31.423	+4.084
15	3	(Japan) Ukyo Katayama	Tyrrell-Yamaha	1:31.630	1:31.736	+4.356
16	25	(Japan) Aguri Suzuki	Ligier-Mugen-Honda	1:32.297	1:31.913	+4.639
17	12	(Netherlands) Jos Verstappen	Simtek-Ford	1:32.156	1:32.425	+4.882
18	23	(Italy) Pierluigi Martini	Minardi-Ford	1:32.445	1:33.832	+5.171
19	10	(Japan) Taki Inoue	Footwork-Hart	1:32.988	1:32.710	+5.436
20	24	(Italy) Luca Badoer	Minardi-Ford	1:33.071	1:33.430	+5.797
21	29	(Austria) Karl Wendlinger	Sauber-Ford	1:33.494	1:33.554	+6.220
22	16	(France) Bertrand Gachot	Pacific-Ford	1:33.892	1:35.253	+6.618
23	11	(Italy) Domenico Schiattarella	Simtek-Ford	1:33.965	1:34.064	+6.691
24	17	(Italy) Andrea Montermini	Pacific-Ford	1:35.169	1:35.282	+7.895
25	22	(Brazil) Roberto Moreno	Forti-Ford	1:37.612	1:36.065	+8.791
26	21	(Brazil) Pedro Diniz	Forti-Ford	1:36.686	1:36.624	+9.350

=== Race ===
Pos	No	Driver	Constructor	Laps	Time/Retired	Grid	Points
1	5	(United Kingdom) Damon Hill	Williams-Renault	63	1:41:42.522	4	10
2	27	(France) Jean Alesi	Ferrari	63	+ 18.510	5	6
3	28	(Austria) Gerhard Berger	Ferrari	63	+ 43.116	2	4
4	6	(United Kingdom) David Coulthard	Williams-Renault	63	+ 51.890	3	3
5	8	(Finland) Mika Häkkinen	McLaren-Mercedes	62	+ 1 Lap	6	2
6	30	(Germany) Heinz-Harald Frentzen	Sauber-Ford	62	+ 1 Lap	14	1
7	2	(United Kingdom) Johnny Herbert	Benetton-Renault	61	+ 2 Laps	8	
8	15	(United Kingdom) Eddie Irvine	Jordan-Peugeot	61	+ 2 Laps	7	
9	26	(France) Olivier Panis	Ligier-Mugen-Honda	61	+ 2 Laps	12	
10	7	(United Kingdom) Nigel Mansell	McLaren-Mercedes	61	+ 2 Laps	9	
11	25	(Japan) Aguri Suzuki	Ligier-Mugen-Honda	60	+ 3 Laps	16	
12	23	(Italy) Pierluigi Martini	Minardi-Ford	59	+ 4 Laps	18	
13	9	(Italy) Gianni Morbidelli	Footwork-Hart	59	+ 4 Laps	11	
14	24	(Italy) Luca Badoer	Minardi-Ford	59	+ 4 Laps	20	
NC	21	(Brazil) Pedro Diniz	Forti-Ford	56	+ 7 Laps	26	
NC	22	(Brazil) Roberto Moreno	Forti-Ford	56	+ 7 Laps	25	
Ret	29	(Austria) Karl Wendlinger	Sauber-Ford	43	Wheel	21	
Ret	16	(France) Bertrand Gachot	Pacific-Ford	36	Gearbox	22	
Ret	11	(Italy) Domenico Schiattarella	Simtek-Ford	35	Suspension	23	
Ret	14	(Brazil) Rubens Barrichello	Jordan-Peugeot	31	Transmission	10	
Ret	3	(Japan) Ukyo Katayama	Tyrrell-Yamaha	23	Spun Off	15	
Ret	4	(Finland) Mika Salo	Tyrrell-Yamaha	19	Engine	13	
Ret	17	(Italy) Andrea Montermini	Pacific-Ford	15	Gearbox	24	
Ret	12	(Netherlands) Jos Verstappen	Simtek-Ford	14	Gearbox	17	
Ret	10	(Japan) Taki Inoue	Footwork-Hart	12	Spun Off	19	
Ret	1	(Germany) Michael Schumacher	Benetton-Renault	10	Accident	1	

== Championship standings after the race ==
Drivers' Championship standings

Pos	Driver	Points
1	(United Kingdom) Damon Hill	20
2	(Germany) Michael Schumacher	14
3	(France) Jean Alesi	14
4	(United Kingdom) David Coulthard	9
5	(Austria) Gerhard Berger	9

Constructors' Championship standings

Pos	Constructor	Points
1	(United Kingdom) Williams-Renault	23
2	(Italy) Ferrari	23
3	(United Kingdom) Benetton-Renault	7
4	(United Kingdom) McLaren-Mercedes	6
5	(Switzerland) Sauber-Ford	3

- Note: Only the top five positions are included for both sets of standings.

Previous race: 1995 Argentine Grand Prix	FIA Formula One World Championship; 1995 season	Next race: 1995 Spanish Grand Prix
Previous race: 1994 San Marino Grand Prix	San Marino Grand Prix	Next race: 1996 San Marino Grand Prix
