= Yamaha F1 engine =

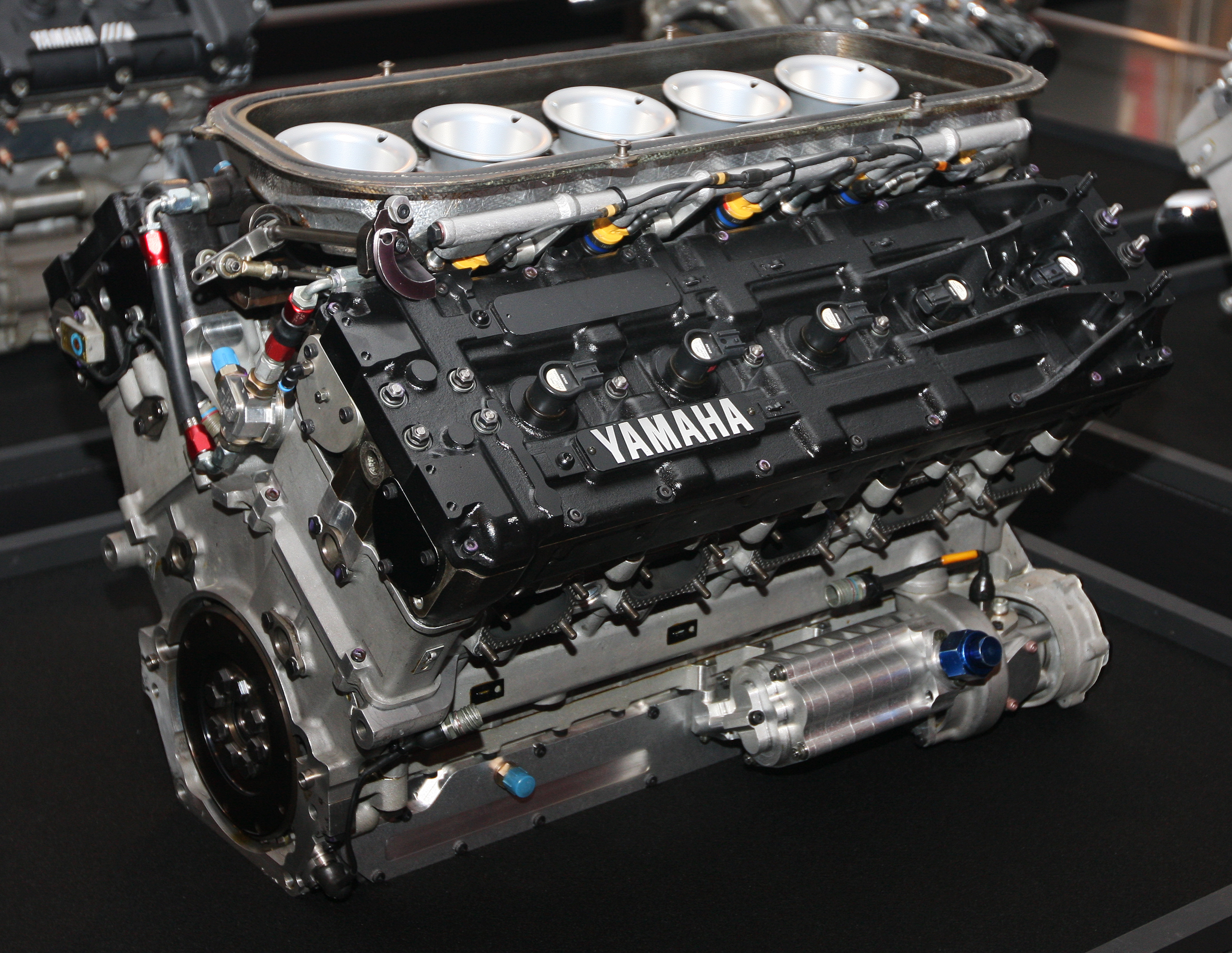
- Yamaha OX10A 3.5L V10 F1 engine (1993)

Overview
- Manufacturer: (Japan) Yamaha
- Production: 1989–1997

Layout
- Configuration: 75° V8; 70° V12; 72° V10
- Displacement: 3.5 L (3,498 cc); 3.5 L (3,496 cc); 3.0 L (2,996 cc)
- Cylinder bore: 94 mm (3.7 in); 84 mm (3.3 in); 92 mm (3.6 in); 90 mm (3.5 in)
- Piston stroke: 63 mm (2.5 in); 52.6 mm (2.1 in); 47.1 mm (1.9 in)

Combustion
- Fuel system: Electronic fuel injection
- Fuel type: Gasoline
- Cooling system: Water-cooled

Output
- Power output: 560–700 hp (418–522 kW; 568–710 PS)
- Torque output: 290–305 lb⋅ft (393–414 N⋅m)

Chronology
- Predecessor: Yamaha OX77

Yamaha developed a number of naturally-aspirated racing engines during their time in Formula One; between 1989 and 1997. They initially supplied engines for Zakspeed, in 1991 for Brabham, in 1992 for Jordan, from 1993 to 1996 for Tyrrell, and in 1997 for Arrows. These never won a race (Damon Hill nearly did so at the 1997 Hungarian Grand Prix), but drivers including Damon Hill, Ukyo Katayama, Mark Blundell and Mika Salo scored some acceptable results with them.

== Applications ==
=== Formula One racing cars ===
- Zakspeed 891
- Brabham BT59Y
- Brabham BT60Y
- Jordan 192
- Tyrrell 020C
- Tyrrell 021
- Tyrrell 022
- Tyrrell 023
- Tyrrell 024
- Arrows A18

=== Road cars ===
Yamaha OX99-11

== Gallery ==
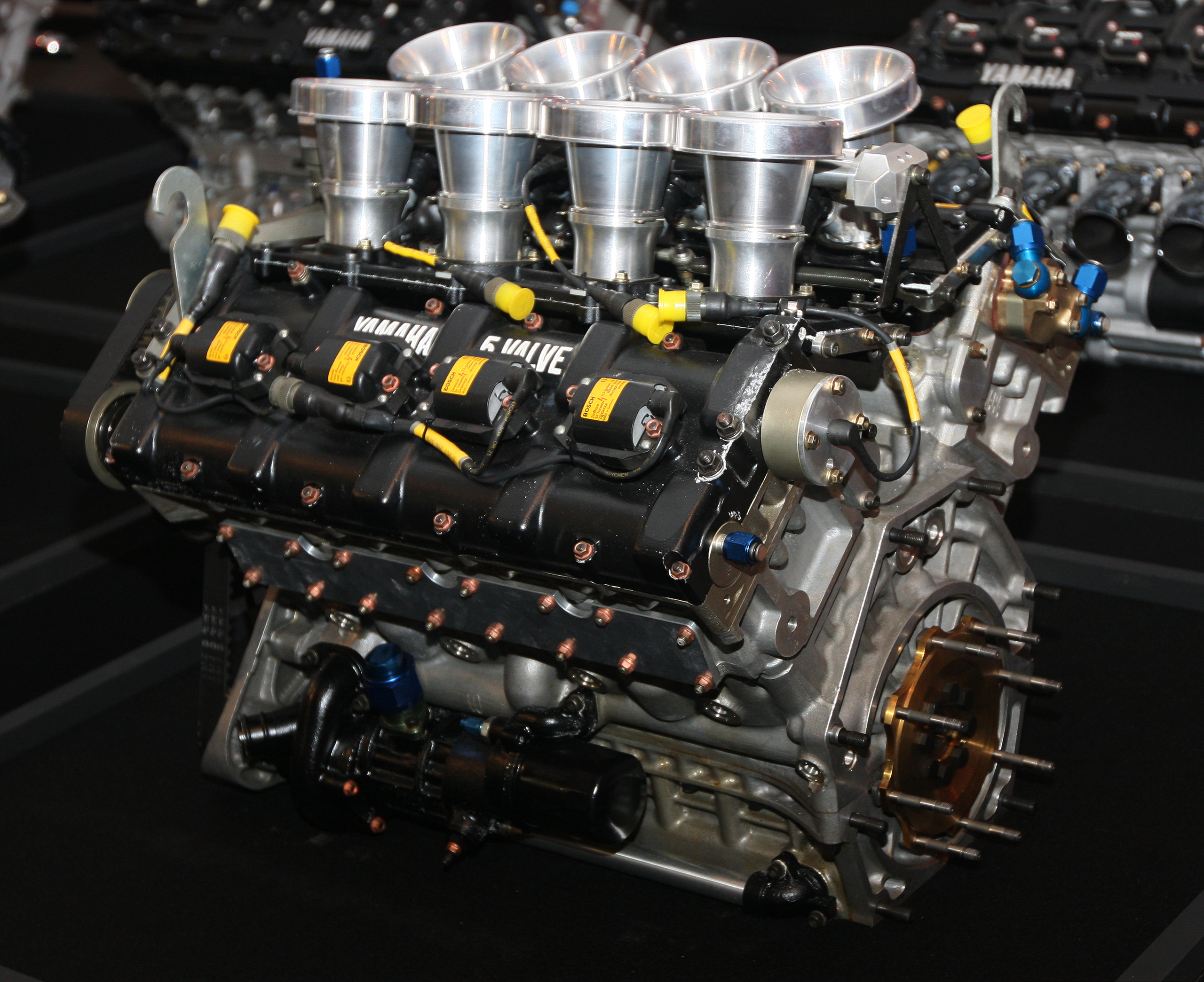
Yamaha OX88 3.5 L V8 F1 engine (1989)

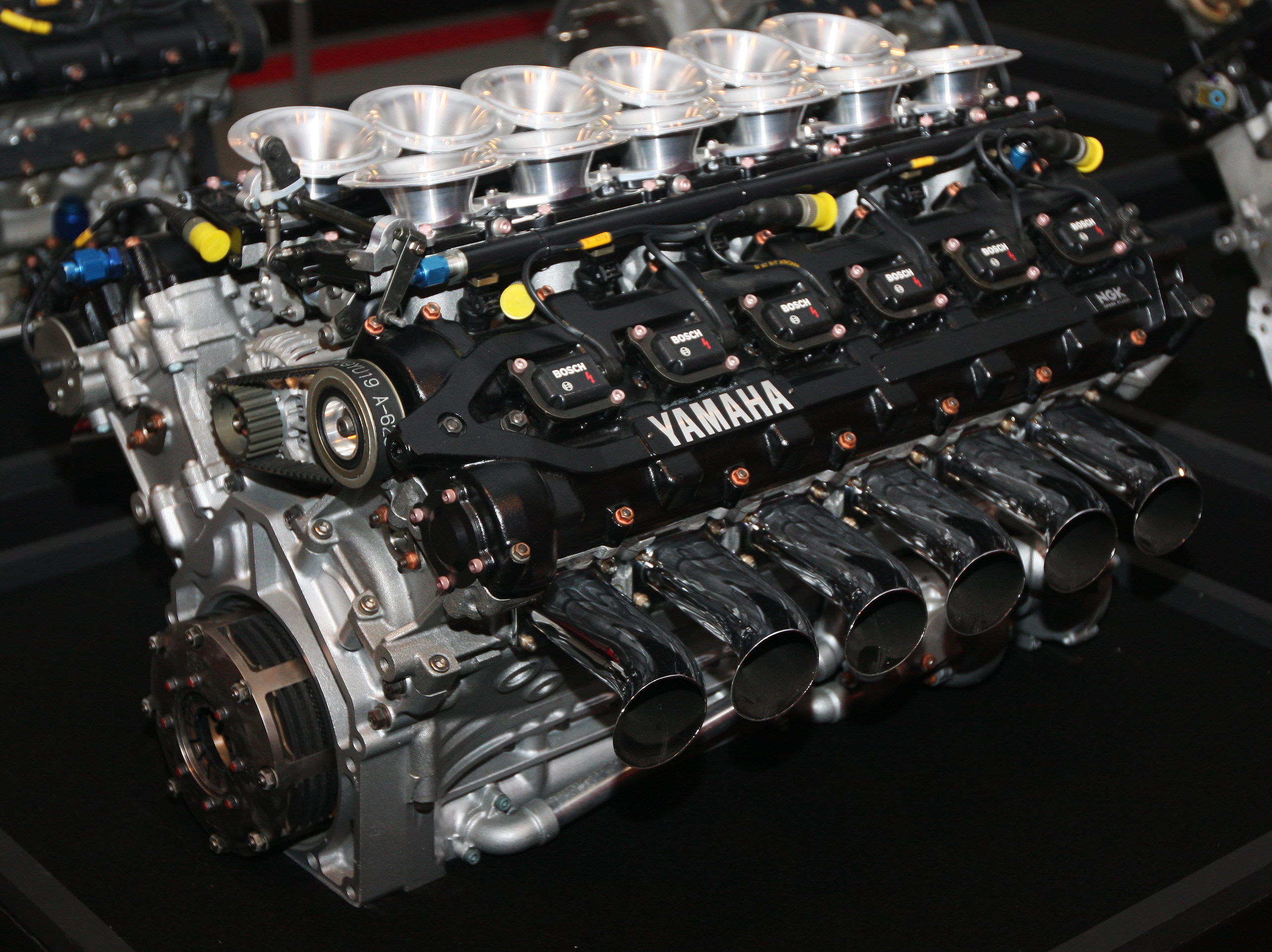
Yamaha OX99 3.5 V12 F1 engine (1992)

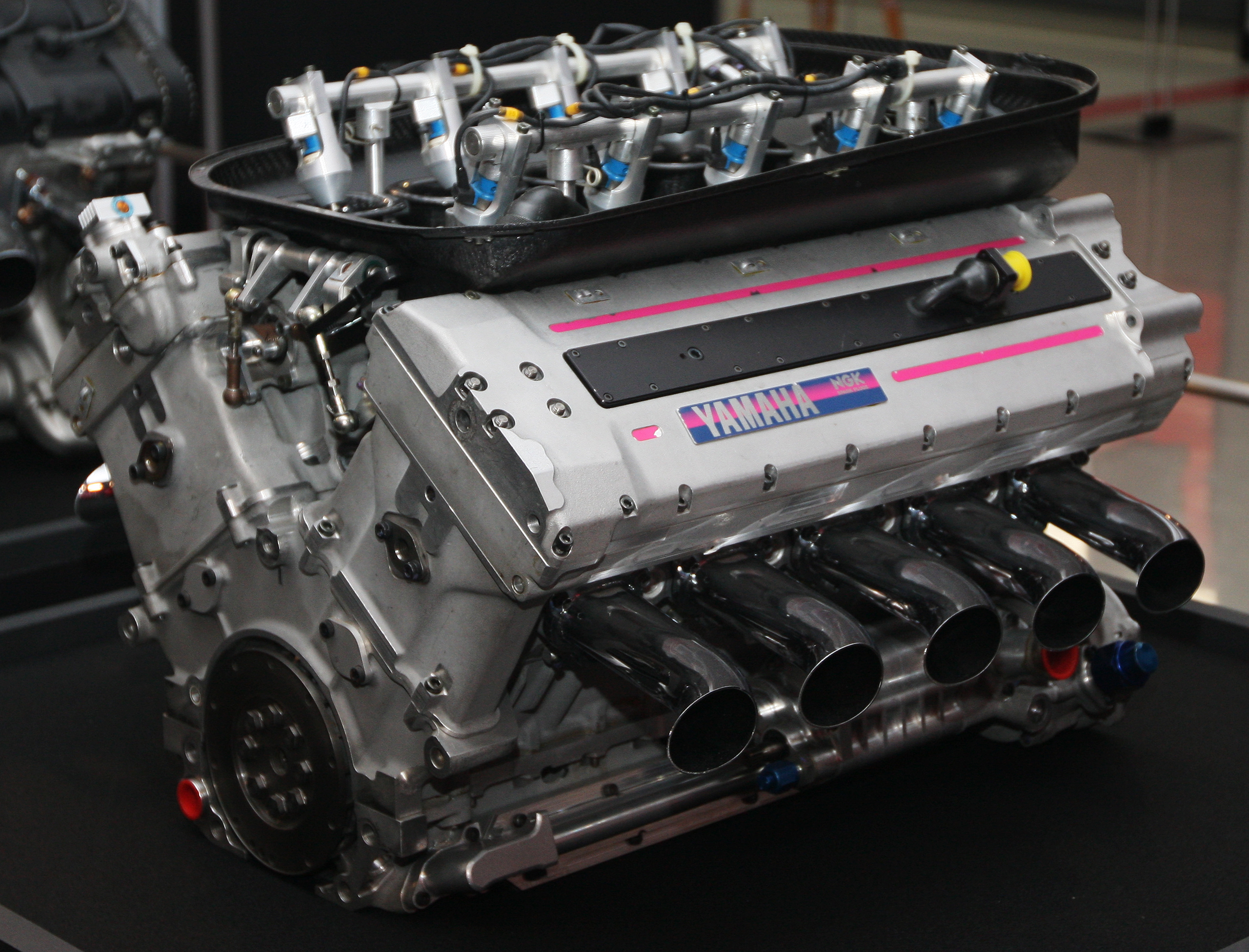
Yamaha OX11A 3.0 L V10 F1 engine (1997)

== Complete Formula One results ==
(key)

Year	Entrant	Chassis	Engine	Tyres	Drivers	1	2	3	4	5	6	7	8	9	10	11	12	13	14	15	16	17	Points	WCC
1989	West Zakspeed Racing	Zakspeed 891	Yamaha OX88 3.5 V8	P		BRA	SMR	MON	MEX	USA	CAN	FRA	GBR	GER	HUN	BEL	ITA	POR	ESP	JPN	AUS		0	NC
1989	West Zakspeed Racing	Zakspeed 891	Yamaha OX88 3.5 V8	P	(West Germany) Bernd Schneider	Ret	DNPQ	DNPQ	DNPQ	DNPQ	DNPQ	DNPQ	DNPQ	DNPQ	DNPQ	DNPQ	DNPQ	DNPQ	DNPQ	Ret	DNPQ		0	NC
1989	West Zakspeed Racing	Zakspeed 891	Yamaha OX88 3.5 V8	P	(Japan) Aguri Suzuki	DNPQ	DNPQ	DNPQ	DNPQ	DNPQ	DNPQ	DNPQ	DNPQ	DNPQ	DNPQ	DNPQ	DNPQ	DNPQ	DNPQ	DNPQ	DNPQ		0	NC
1991	Brabham	Brabham BT59Y; Brabham BT60Y	Yamaha OX99 3.5 V12	P		USA	BRA	SMR	MON	CAN	MEX	FRA	GBR	GER	HUN	BEL	ITA	POR	ESP	JPN	AUS		3	9th
1991	Brabham	Brabham BT59Y; Brabham BT60Y	Yamaha OX99 3.5 V12	P	(United Kingdom) Martin Brundle	11	12	11	EX	Ret	Ret	Ret	Ret	11	Ret	9	13	12	10	5	DNQ		3	9th
1991	Brabham	Brabham BT59Y; Brabham BT60Y	Yamaha OX99 3.5 V12	P	(United Kingdom) Mark Blundell	Ret	Ret	8	Ret	DNQ	Ret	Ret	Ret	12	Ret	6	12	Ret	Ret	DNPQ	17		3	9th
1992	Sasol Jordan Yamaha	Jordan 192	Yamaha OX99 3.5 V12	G		RSA	MEX	BRA	ESP	SMR	MON	CAN	FRA	GBR	GER	HUN	BEL	ITA	POR	JPN	AUS		1	11th
1992	Sasol Jordan Yamaha	Jordan 192	Yamaha OX99 3.5 V12	G	(Italy) Stefano Modena	DNQ	Ret	Ret	DNQ	Ret	Ret	Ret	Ret	Ret	DNQ	Ret	15	DNQ	13	7	6		1	11th
1992	Sasol Jordan Yamaha	Jordan 192	Yamaha OX99 3.5 V12	G	(Brazil) Maurício Gugelmin	11	Ret	Ret	Ret	7	Ret	Ret	Ret	Ret	15	10	14	Ret	Ret	Ret	Ret		1	11th
1993	Tyrrell	Tyrrell 020C; Tyrrell 021	Yamaha OX10A 3.5 V10	G		RSA	BRA	EUR	SMR	ESP	MON	CAN	FRA	GBR	GER	HUN	BEL	ITA	POR	JPN	AUS		0	NC
1993	Tyrrell	Tyrrell 020C; Tyrrell 021	Yamaha OX10A 3.5 V10	G	(Japan) Ukyo Katayama	Ret	Ret	Ret	Ret	Ret	Ret	17	Ret	13	Ret	10	15	14	Ret	Ret	Ret		0	NC
1993	Tyrrell	Tyrrell 020C; Tyrrell 021	Yamaha OX10A 3.5 V10	G	(Italy) Andrea de Cesaris	Ret	Ret	Ret	Ret	DSQ	10	Ret	15	NC	Ret	11	Ret	13	12	Ret	13		0	NC
1994	Tyrrell	Tyrrell 022	Yamaha OX10B 3.5 V10	G		BRA	PAC	SMR	MON	ESP	CAN	FRA	GBR	GER	HUN	BEL	ITA	POR	EUR	JPN	AUS		13	7th
1994	Tyrrell	Tyrrell 022	Yamaha OX10B 3.5 V10	G	(Japan) Ukyo Katayama	5	Ret	5	Ret	Ret	Ret	Ret	6	Ret	Ret	Ret	Ret	Ret	7	Ret	Ret		13	7th
1994	Tyrrell	Tyrrell 022	Yamaha OX10B 3.5 V10	G	(United Kingdom) Mark Blundell	Ret	Ret	9	Ret	3	10	10	Ret	Ret	5	5	Ret	Ret	13	Ret	Ret		13	7th
1995	Nokia Tyrrell Yamaha	Tyrrell 023	Yamaha OX10C 3.0 V10	G		BRA	ARG	SMR	ESP	MON	CAN	FRA	GBR	GER	HUN	BEL	ITA	POR	EUR	PAC	JPN	AUS	5	8th
1995	Nokia Tyrrell Yamaha	Tyrrell 023	Yamaha OX10C 3.0 V10	G	(Japan) Ukyo Katayama	Ret	8	Ret	Ret	Ret	Ret	Ret	Ret	7	Ret	Ret	10	Ret		14	Ret	Ret	5	8th
1995	Nokia Tyrrell Yamaha	Tyrrell 023	Yamaha OX10C 3.0 V10	G	(Italy) Gabriele Tarquini														14				5	8th
1995	Nokia Tyrrell Yamaha	Tyrrell 023	Yamaha OX10C 3.0 V10	G	(Finland) Mika Salo	7	Ret	Ret	10	Ret	7	15	8	Ret	Ret	8	5	13	10	12	6	5	5	8th
1996	Tyrrell Yamaha	Tyrrell 024	Yamaha OX11A 3.0 V10	G		AUS	BRA	ARG	EUR	SMR	MON	ESP	CAN	FRA	GBR	GER	HUN	BEL	ITA	POR	JPN		5	8th
1996	Tyrrell Yamaha	Tyrrell 024	Yamaha OX11A 3.0 V10	G	(Japan) Ukyo Katayama	11	9	Ret	DSQ	Ret	Ret	Ret	Ret	Ret	Ret	Ret	7	8	10	12	Ret		5	8th
1996	Tyrrell Yamaha	Tyrrell 024	Yamaha OX11A 3.0 V10	G	(Finland) Mika Salo	6	5	Ret	DSQ	Ret	5	DSQ	Ret	10	7	9	Ret	7	Ret	11	Ret		5	8th
1997	Danka Arrows Yamaha	Arrows A18	Yamaha OX11C/D 3.0 V10	B		AUS	BRA	ARG	SMR	MON	ESP	CAN	FRA	GBR	GER	HUN	BEL	ITA	AUT	LUX	JPN	EUR	9	8th
1997	Danka Arrows Yamaha	Arrows A18	Yamaha OX11C/D 3.0 V10	B	(United Kingdom) Damon Hill	DNS	17	Ret	Ret	Ret	Ret	9	12	6	8	2	13	Ret	7	8	12	Ret	9	8th
1997	Danka Arrows Yamaha	Arrows A18	Yamaha OX11C/D 3.0 V10	B	(Brazil) Pedro Diniz	10	Ret	Ret	Ret	Ret	Ret	8	Ret	Ret	Ret	Ret	7	Ret	13	5	13	Ret	9	8th

== See also ==
- Judd F1 Engine
- Renault RS engine
- Honda V10 engine
- Peugeot F1 engine
- Ilmor 2175 engine
- Mercedes-Benz FO engine
- Hart 1035 engine
- Ferrari V10 engine
- Cosworth JD / VJ engine
- Petronas F1 engine
- Cosworth CR engine
