= Tyrrell 023 =

Formula One racing car

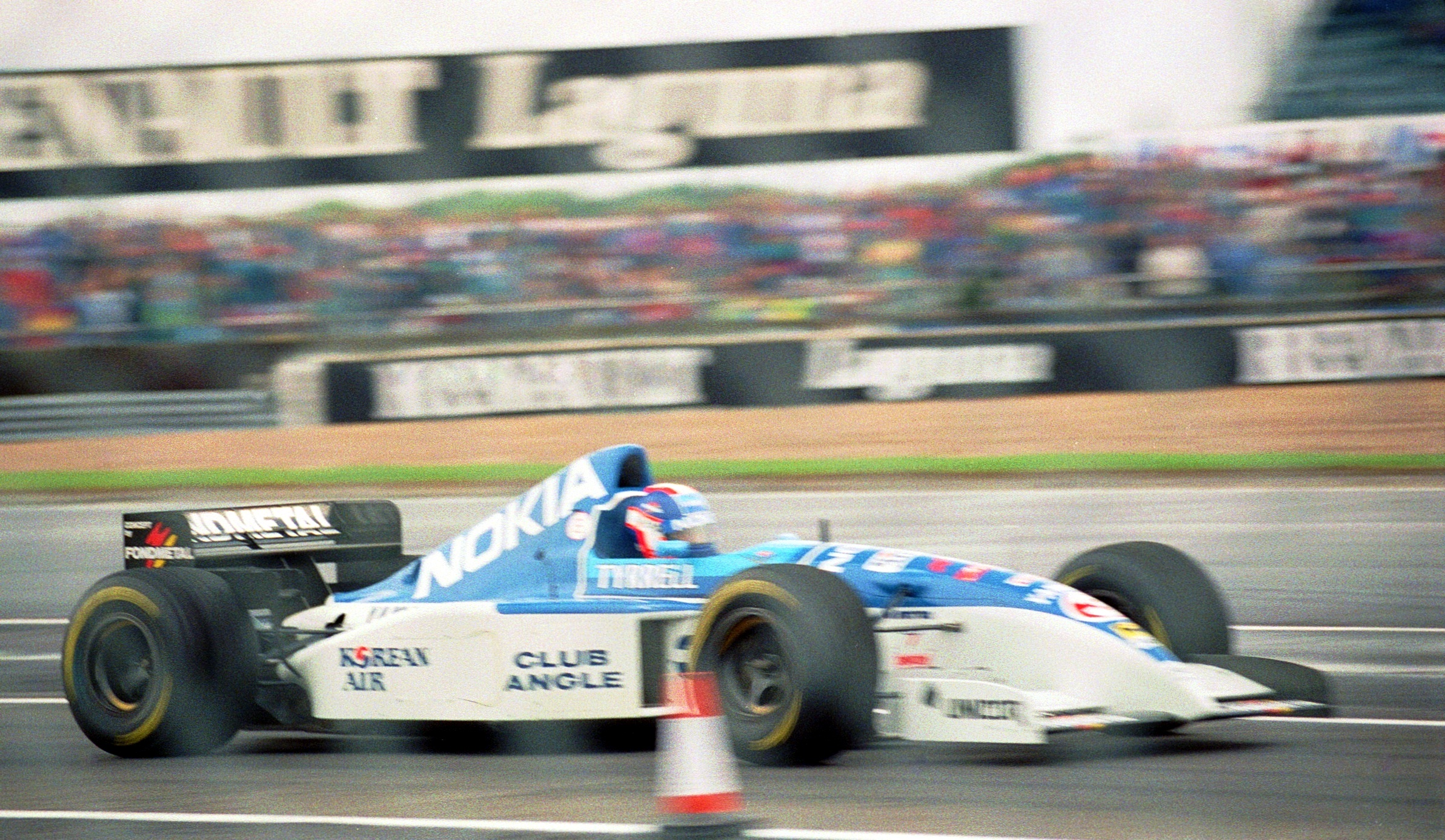
- Ukyo Katayama driving the Tyrrell 023 at the 1995 British Grand Prix
- Category: Formula One
- Constructor: Tyrrell
- Designers: Harvey Postlethwaite (Technical Director); Mike Gascoyne (Chief Designer); Jean-Claude Migeot (Head of Aerodynamics)
- Predecessor: 022
- Successor: 024

Technical specifications
- Chassis: Carbon fibre and honeycomb composite structure
- Suspension (front): Tyrrell Hydrolink
- Suspension (rear): Tyrrell Hydrolink
- Engine: Yamaha OX10C, 2,996 cc (182.8 cu in), 72° V10, NA, mid-engine, longitudinally mounted
- Transmission: Tyrrell transverse 6-speed sequential semi-automatic
- Power: 680 hp (507 kW) @ 13,300 rpm
- Fuel: Agip
- Tyres: Goodyear

Competition history
- Notable entrants: Nokia Tyrrell Yamaha
- Notable drivers: 3. (Japan) Ukyo Katayama; 3. (Italy) Gabriele Tarquini; 4. (Finland) Mika Salo
- Debut: 1995 Brazilian Grand Prix
- Last event: 1995 Australian Grand Prix
Races	Wins	Poles	F/Laps
17	0	0	0
- Constructors' Championships: 0
- Drivers' Championships: 0

The Tyrrell 023 was a Formula One car designed by Harvey Postlethwaite and Mike Gascoyne for use by the Tyrrell team in the 1995 Formula One World Championship. The car was driven by Japanese Ukyo Katayama, in his third season with the team, and Finn Mika Salo, in his first full season of F1 after driving for Lotus in the final two races of 1994. The team's test driver, Italian Gabriele Tarquini, deputised for an injured Katayama at the European Grand Prix. The best finish achieved by the 023 was fifth, by Salo at the Italian and Australian Grands Prix.

== Design and development ==
Designed by Harvey Postlethwaite and Mike Gascoyne, the 023 featured a new hydraulic-controlled front suspension system, known as "Hydrolink", which Tyrrell had been testing since February 1995. It used a 3-litre version of the Yamaha V10, which had been raced the previous year.

The team retained all its 1994 backers including Mild Seven, BP, Fondmetal, Calbee, Club Angle and Zent. The car's budget was also boosted by the team's new driver Mika Salo bringing $3 million in sponsorship from Nokia. Ukyo Katayama, who had driven for the team since 1993, remained on the roster.

After an impressive 1994 showing with the simple but effective 022, 1995 was a huge disappointment for the team. The 023 chassis proved to be very mediocre and the team's innovative "Hydrolink" suspension was rendered ineffective due to its deficiencies. The Hydrolink suspension was eventually removed from the 023 at mid-season.

== Racing history ==
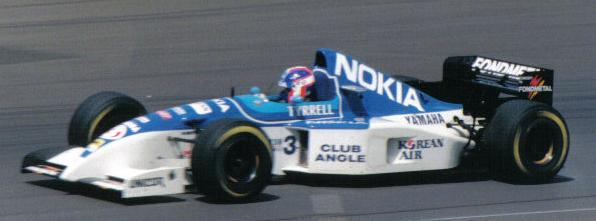
Ukyo Katayama driving the 023 at the 1995 British Grand Prix

Salo was impressive in his first full season of F1, scoring all of the team's total of five points. He could have done even better, holding third place at the season-opening Brazilian GP before spinning back to seventh due to cramp. He was also set for points at the next race, but was taken out by backmarker Aguri Suzuki. As such, the Finn had to wait until the second half of the season to score his first points.

Katayama, on the other hand, proved to be very disappointing after a promising effort in 1994. He was disadvantaged by the new higher cockpit sides as a short driver, but was still outclassed by his inexperienced team-mate. Test driver Gabriele Tarquini stood in for Katayama at the Nürburgring after the Japanese was injured in an acrobatic startline crash at Estoril. After his retirement in 1997, the Japanese revealed that he had suffered a cancer on his back, which, although not harmful, had an adverse effect on his competitiveness.

Tyrrell eventually finished ninth in the Constructors' Championship, with five points, all scored by Salo, behind Footwork due to Gianni Morbidelli's third-place finish at Adelaide.

== Sponsorship and livery ==
In the first two Grands Prix, the 023 was painted in dark blue. Starting from San Marino Grand Prix onwards, the livery was updated into a light blue top and white paint. The team also gained a new Korean Air sponsorship for the remainder of the season.

In the Grands Prix that did not allow tobacco branding, the Mild Seven logos were replaced with "Tyrrell".

== Complete Formula One results ==
(key)

Year	Team	Engine	Tyres	Drivers	No.	1	2	3	4	5	6	7	8	9	10	11	12	13	14	15	16	17	Pts.	WCC
1995	Nokia Tyrrell Yamaha	Yamaha OX10C; V10	G			BRA	ARG	SMR	ESP	MON	CAN	FRA	GBR	GER	HUN	BEL	ITA	POR	EUR	PAC	JPN	AUS	5	9th
1995	Nokia Tyrrell Yamaha	Yamaha OX10C; V10	G	Ukyo Katayama	3	Ret	8	Ret	Ret	Ret	Ret	Ret	Ret	7	Ret	Ret	NC	Ret		14	Ret	Ret	5	9th
1995	Nokia Tyrrell Yamaha	Yamaha OX10C; V10	G	Gabriele Tarquini	3														14				5	9th
1995	Nokia Tyrrell Yamaha	Yamaha OX10C; V10	G	Mika Salo	4	7	Ret	Ret	10	Ret	7	15	8	Ret	Ret	8	5	13	10	12	6	5	5	9th
