= Arrows A18 =

Formula One Car

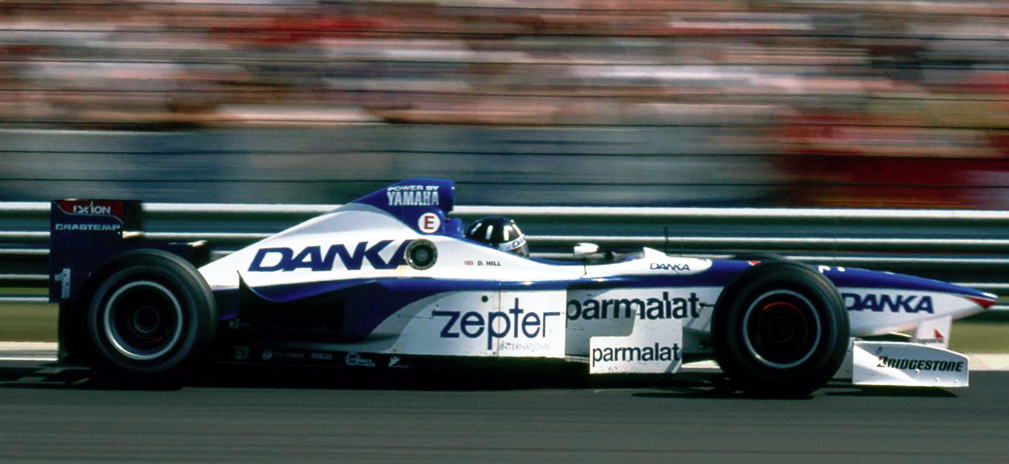
- Damon Hill driving the A18 at the 1997 Hungarian Grand Prix
- Category: Formula One
- Constructor: Arrows
- Designers: Frank Dernie (Technical Director) (initially); John Barnard (Technical Director); Paul Bowen (Chief Designer); Gary Savage (Head of R&D); Simon Jennings (Head of Aerodynamics)
- Predecessor: Footwork FA17
- Successor: A19

Technical specifications
- Chassis: carbon-fibre and honeycomb composite structure
- Suspension (front): double wishbones, pushrod
- Suspension (rear): double wishbones, pushrod
- Engine: Yamaha OX11C/D 72-degree V10
- Transmission: Arrows/Xtrac six-speed longitudinal sequential semi-automatic
- Power: 700 hp @ 14,000 rpm
- Fuel: Petroscience
- Lubricants: Shell
- Tyres: Bridgestone

Competition history
- Notable entrants: Danka Arrows Yamaha
- Notable drivers: 1. (United Kingdom) Damon Hill; 2. (Brazil) Pedro Diniz
- Debut: 1997 Australian Grand Prix
- Last event: 1997 European Grand Prix
| Races | Wins | Podiums | Poles | F/Laps |
|---|---|---|---|---|
| 17 | 0 | 1 | 0 | 0 |
- Constructors' Championships: 0
- Drivers' Championships: 0

The Arrows A18 was the car with which the Arrows Formula One team competed in the 1997 Formula One World Championship. It was driven by Briton Damon Hill, the reigning World Champion who had made the surprising move to the team after being dropped by Williams, and Brazilian Pedro Diniz, who had moved from Ligier.

This was the last Formula One car powered by Yamaha engines after the manufacturer's decision to withdraw from the sport at the end of the season.

== Development ==
The A18 was launched in January 1997. 1997 marked a new beginning for the team, with two new drivers, a new engine supplier in Yamaha with the engines tuned by John Judd and new tyres supplied by Bridgestone, supplied under an exclusive deal. The team moved from old premises in Milton Keynes to TWR's purpose-built factory in Leafield. The year also marked the first full season for Tom Walkinshaw's outfit TWR in running the team, as the Scotsman had bought it from one of its founders, Jackie Oliver, during 1996.

== Race history ==
After a disastrous start to the season which saw the cars almost fail to make the grid in Australia, the team improved, hiring John Barnard as Technical Director. The A18 was proven to be woefully unreliable, despite Walkinshaw's claims that he had wanted a simple and basic chassis design. Damon Hill stated in his autobiography that the car was good to drive but lacked downforce. Hill scored a point at Silverstone, but the highlight of the year came at the Hungarian GP, where he qualified third and led for most of the race. The failure of a throttle linkage component saw him drop behind Jacques Villeneuve on the final lap, although second place was still a great success for the team. Diniz also scored two points at the Nürburgring.

The team eventually finished eighth in the Constructors' Championship, with nine points.

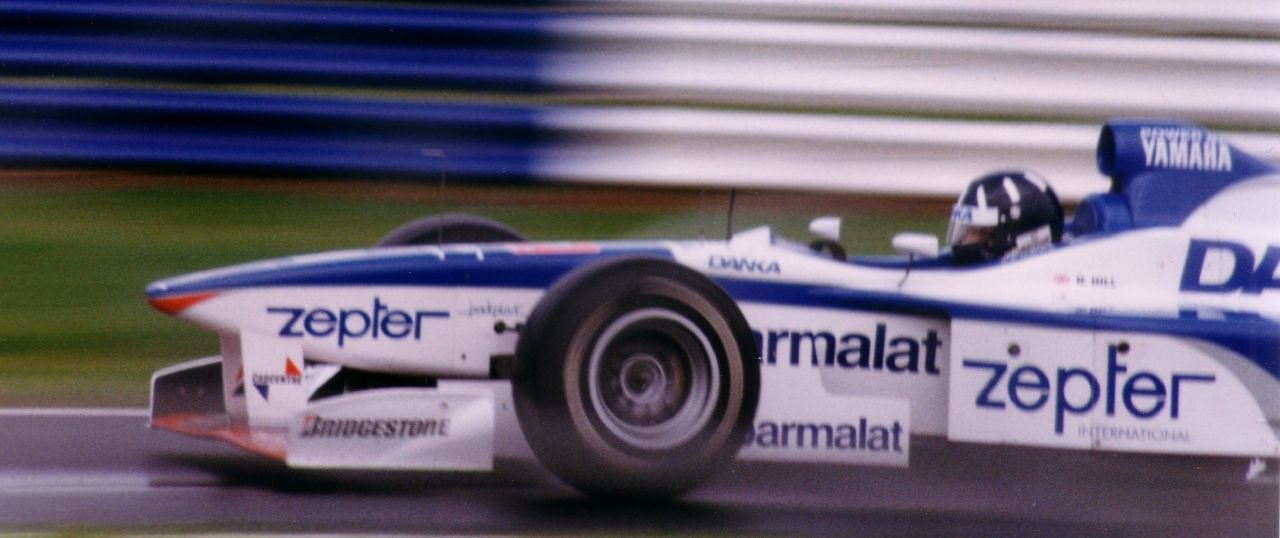
Damon Hill driving the A18 at the 1997 British GP.

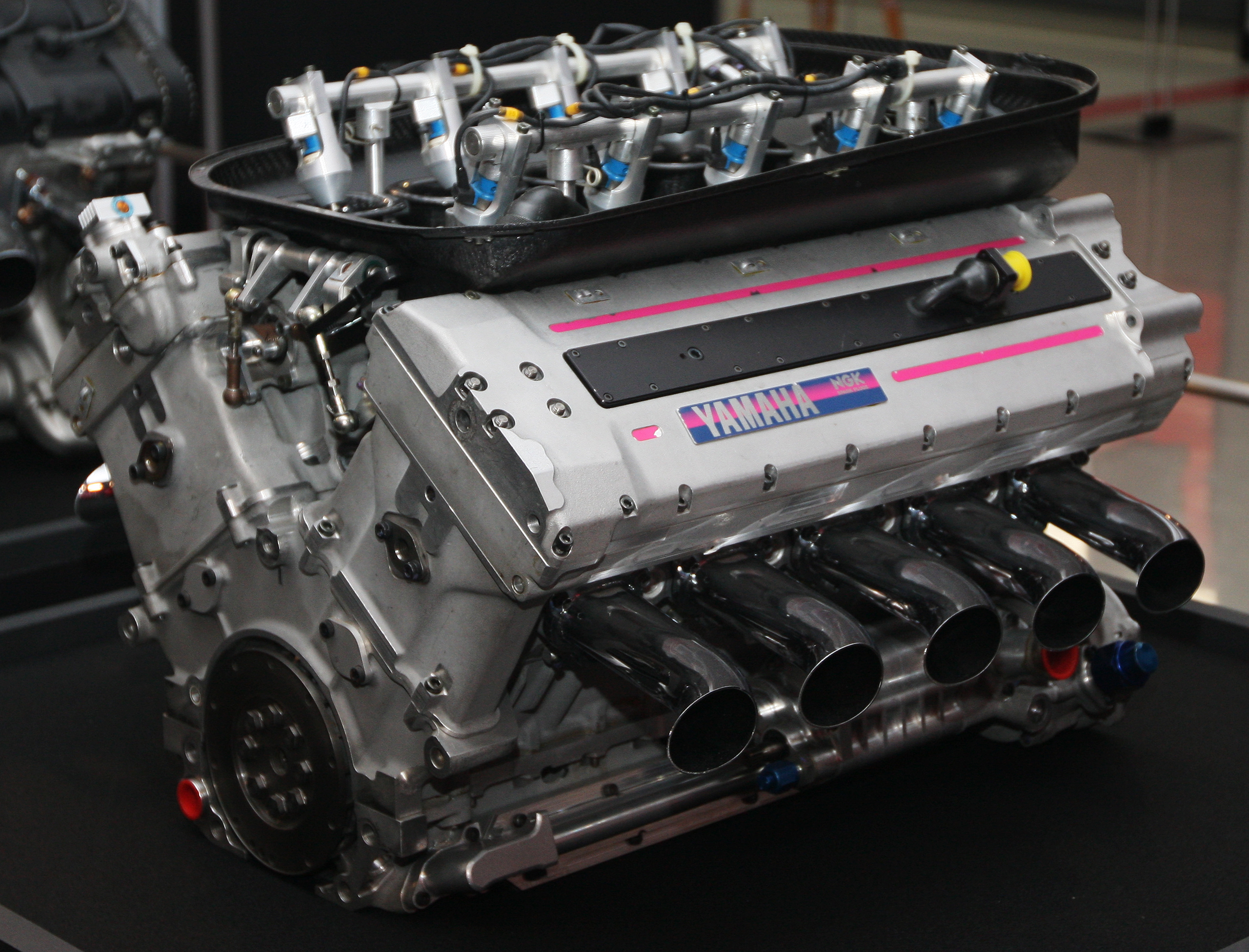
The Yamaha OX11A engine that powered the A18.

== Complete Formula One results ==
(key) (results in bold indicate pole position)

| Year | Entrant | Engine | Tyres | Drivers | 1 | 2 | 3 | 4 | 5 | 6 | 7 | 8 | 9 | 10 | 11 | 12 | 13 | 14 | 15 | 16 | 17 | Points | WCC |
|---|---|---|---|---|---|---|---|---|---|---|---|---|---|---|---|---|---|---|---|---|---|---|---|
| 1997 | Danka Arrows Yamaha | Yamaha V10 | **B** | | AUS | BRA | ARG | SMR | MON | ESP | CAN | FRA | GBR | GER | HUN | BEL | ITA | AUT | LUX | JPN | EUR | **9** | **8th** |
| 1997 | Danka Arrows Yamaha | Yamaha V10 | **B** | Damon Hill | DNS | 17 | Ret | Ret | Ret | Ret | 9 | 12 | 6 | 8 | 2 | 13 | Ret | 7 | 8 | 12 | Ret | **9** | **8th** |
| 1997 | Danka Arrows Yamaha | Yamaha V10 | **B** | Pedro Diniz | 10 | Ret | Ret | Ret | Ret | Ret | 8 | Ret | Ret | Ret | Ret | 7 | Ret | 13 | 5 | 13 | Ret | **9** | **8th** |
