= Tyrrell 022 =

Formula One racing car

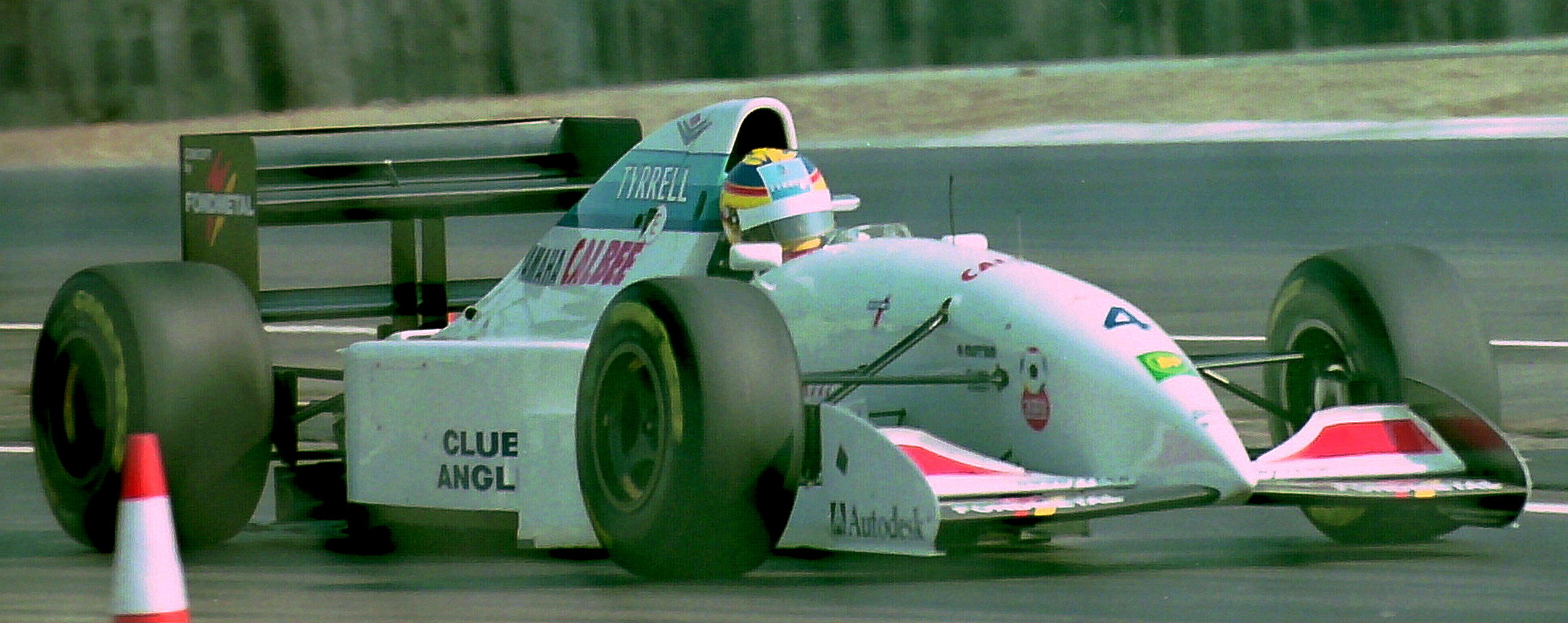
- Mark Blundell driving the 022 at the 1994 British Grand Prix
- Category: Formula One
- Constructor: Tyrrell
- Designers: Harvey Postlethwaite (Technical Director); Mike Gascoyne (Chief Designer); Jean-Claude Migeot (Head of Aerodynamics)
- Predecessor: 021
- Successor: 023

Technical specifications
- Chassis: Carbon Fibre monocoque
- Suspension (front): Double wishbones, pushrods
- Suspension (rear): Double wishbones, pushrods
- Axle track: Front: 1,698 mm (66.9 in); Rear: 1,610 mm (63 in)
- Wheelbase: 2,900 mm (110 in)
- Engine: Yamaha OX10B, 3,496 cc (213.3 cu in), V10, NA, mid-engine, longitudinally mounted
- Transmission: Tyrrell 6-speed sequential Semi-automatic
- Weight: 515 kg (1,135 lb)
- Fuel: BP
- Tyres: Goodyear

Competition history
- Notable entrants: Tyrrell Racing Organisation
- Notable drivers: 3. (Japan) Ukyo Katayama; 4. (United Kingdom) Mark Blundell
- Debut: 1994 Brazilian Grand Prix
- Last event: 1994 Australian Grand Prix
Races	Wins	Podiums	Poles	F/Laps
16	0	1	0	0
- Constructors' Championships: 0
- Drivers' Championships: 0

The Tyrrell 022 was the car with which the Tyrrell team competed in the 1994 Formula One World Championship. The car was powered by the Yamaha OX10B 3.5-litre V10 engine and was driven by Japanese Ukyo Katayama, in his second season with the team, and Briton Mark Blundell, who moved from Ligier.

The 022 was the car with which Tyrrell achieved its final podium finish, courtesy of Blundell at the Spanish Grand Prix.

It was replaced by the 023 for 1995.

== Later use ==
The 022 was later used in the BOSS GP Series by Nigel Greensall, winning the Open Class title in 1997 and 1998.

In 2009, one of the 022s was used in the US BOSS Championship.

== Sponsorship and livery ==
The team retained all the sponsors from the previous season including Autodesk, BP, Calbee and Club Angle. Tyrrell used the Mild Seven logos (replacing fellow Japan Tobacco brand Cabin from the previous season), except at the French, British and German Grands Prix due to bans on tobacco branding.

== Race results ==
(key)

Year	Team	Engine	Tyres	Drivers	1	2	3	4	5	6	7	8	9	10	11	12	13	14	15	16	Pts.	WCC
1994	Tyrrell	Yamaha OX10B V10	G		BRA	PAC	SMR	MON	ESP	CAN	FRA	GBR	GER	HUN	BEL	ITA	POR	EUR	JPN	AUS	13	7th
1994	Tyrrell	Yamaha OX10B V10	G	Ukyo Katayama	5	Ret	5	Ret	Ret	Ret	Ret	6	Ret	Ret	Ret	Ret	Ret	7	Ret	Ret	13	7th
1994	Tyrrell	Yamaha OX10B V10	G	Mark Blundell	Ret	Ret	9	Ret	3	10	10	Ret	Ret	5	5	Ret	Ret	13	Ret	Ret	13	7th
