= Tyrrell 020 =

Formula 1 racing car

Tyrrell 020 Tyrrell 020B Tyrrell 020C
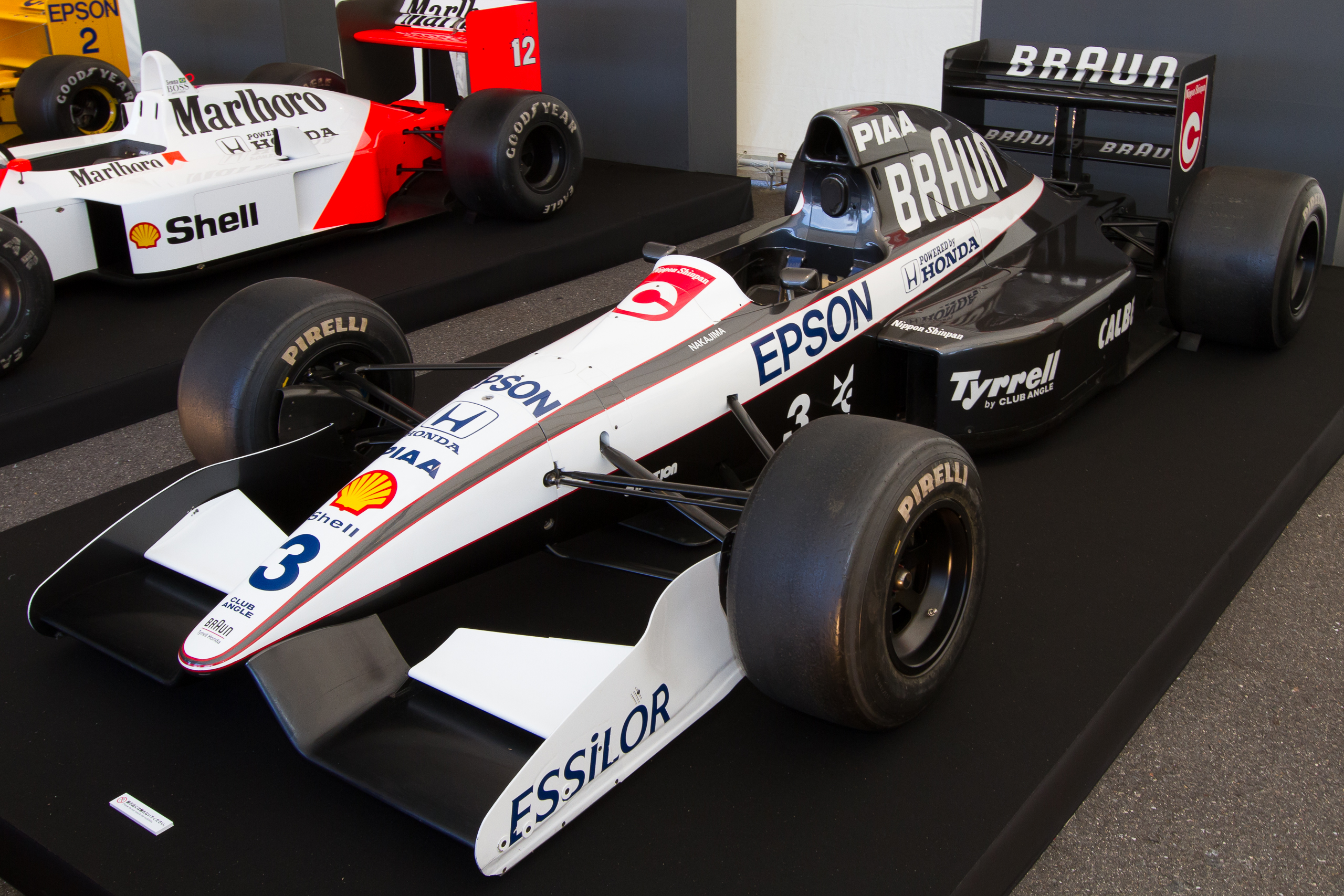
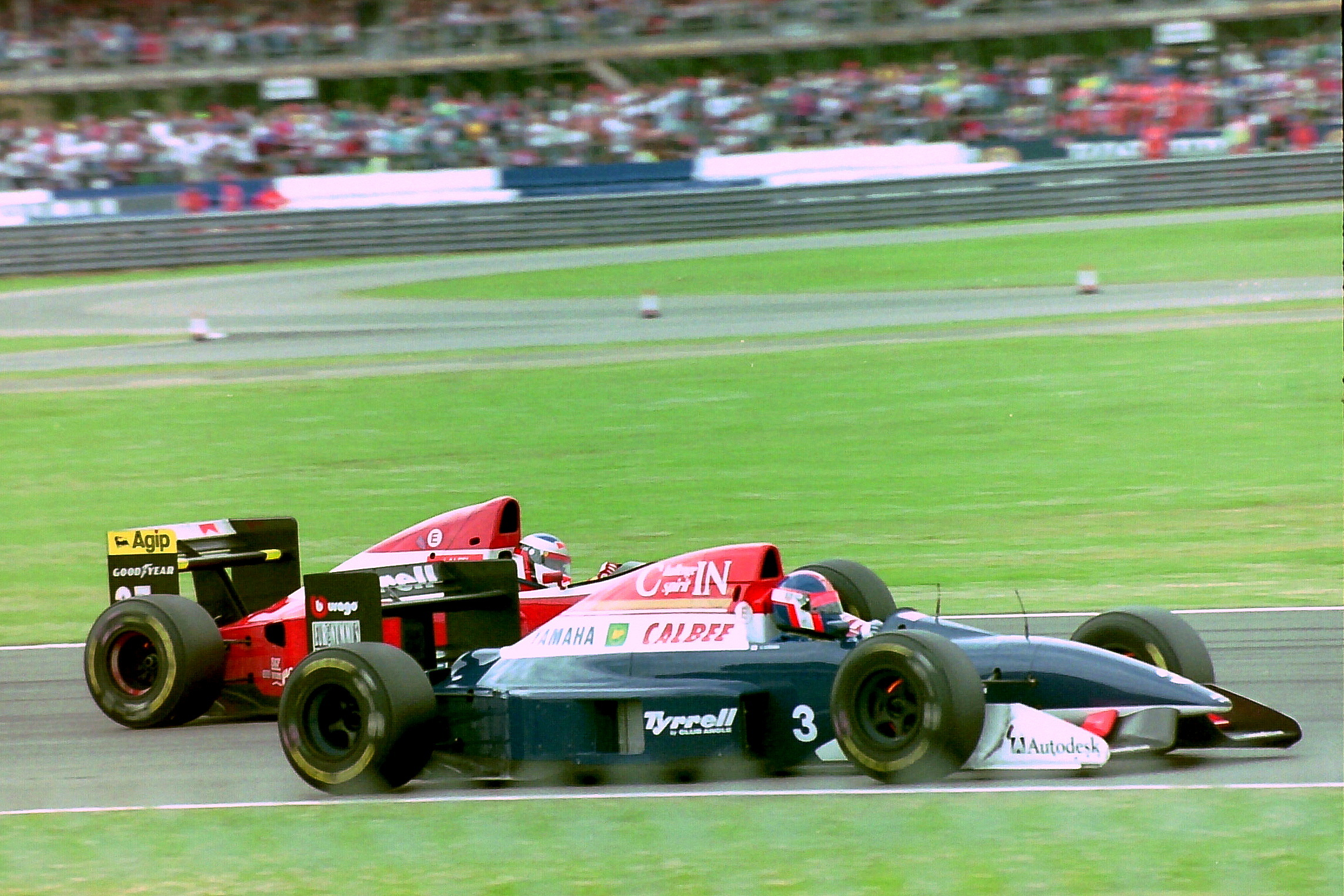
- Tyrrell 020 (1991) Tyrrell 020C (1993)
- Category: Formula One
- Constructor: Tyrrell Racing Organisation
- Designers: George Ryton (Technical Director); Mike Coughlan (Chief Designer)
- Predecessor: 019
- Successor: 021

Technical specifications
- Chassis: Carbon fibre monocoque
- Suspension (front): Double wishbone with pullrod operated coil springs
- Suspension (rear): Double wishbone with pullrod operated coil springs
- Engine: 1991: mid-engine, longitudinally mounted, 3,498 cc (213.5 cu in), Honda RA101E, 72° V10, NA; 1992: mid-engine, longitudinally mounted, 3,478 cc (212.2 cu in), Ilmor LH10, 72° V10, NA; 1993: mid-engine, longitudinally mounted, 3,493 cc (213.2 cu in), Yamaha OX10A, 72° V10, NA
- Transmission: Hewland 6-speed sequential semi-automatic
- Fuel: 1991: Shell; 1992: Elf; 1993: BP
- Tyres: 1991: Pirelli; 1992-1993: Goodyear

Competition history
- Notable entrants: Braun Tyrrell Honda (1991); Tyrrell Racing Organisation
- Notable drivers: 3. (Japan) Satoru Nakajima; 3. (France) Olivier Grouillard; 3. (Japan) Ukyo Katayama; 4. (Italy) Stefano Modena; 4. (Italy) Andrea de Cesaris
- Debut: 1991 United States Grand Prix
- Last event: 1993 British Grand Prix
Races	Wins	Poles	F/Laps
41	0	0	0
- Constructors' Championships: 0
- Drivers' Championships: 0

The Tyrrell 020 was a Formula One racing car designed by Harvey Postlethwaite and George Ryton for Tyrrell Racing and raced during the 1991 season, the entire 1992 season and the half of 1993 season.

== Overview ==
=== 1991 ===
The 020 was driven by Satoru Nakajima who brought the Honda engine contract with him and also by Stefano Modena. Its best result was a second place by Modena in the Canadian Grand Prix. Tyrrell scored 12 points to finish 6th in the Constructors' Championship with half the points scored by Modena's 2nd in Canada.

The car was powered by the 690 bhp (515 kW; 700 PS) Honda RA101E V10 engine previously raced by McLaren in 1990 and maintained by Mugen Motorsports, which would run Mugen-Honda badged engines the following year for Footwork Arrows.

=== 1992 ===
The car was updated for the 1992 season and was dubbed the 020B. For this season the Honda V10 was replaced with the 680 bhp (507 kW; 689 PS) Ilmor LH10 V10 engine and ran on Goodyear tyres. It was driven by Olivier Grouillard and veteran Andrea de Cesaris. The team only scored 8 points for the season but again finished in 6th place.

=== 1993 ===
The 020 was pressed into service again for the first nine races of the 1993 season. Again updated it was called the 020C. For the third time in three years the car ran a V10 engine but this time it carried the 690 bhp (515 kW; 700 PS) Yamaha OX10A. It was driven again by De Cesaris who was joined by Japanese driver Ukyo Katayama. Neither driver would score a World Championship point driving the car.

The Tyrrell 020C was replaced by the 021 midway through the 1993 season.

== Sponsorship and livery ==
=== 1991 ===
During the pre-season test, the 020 sporting the similar livery to its predecessor. After failing to deal with a tobacco brand sponsorship, Braun was chosen as the team's main sponsor. The car painted in primer grey colour with white graphics and red pinstripes.

=== 1992 ===
After losing the aftermentioned main sponsor, the livery was changed. The car was painted in white base colour and dark blue. Retaining sponsors including Nippon Shinpan and Calbee. Eurosport joined as their minor sponsor.

=== 1993 ===
The livery was given yet another changes. This time, the car was painted with a same white base colour with red and blue livery. Japanese tobacco company, Cabin joined as the team's main sponsor. In the Grands Prix that did not allow tobacco branding, the text was read as "Challenge Spirit In F1". This livery would be carried over by its successor.

== Complete Formula One results ==
(key)

Year	Entrant	Chassis	Engine	Tyres	Drivers	1	2	3	4	5	6	7	8	9	10	11	12	13	14	15	16	Points	WCC
1991	Braun Tyrrell Honda	Tyrrell 020	Honda RA101E; V10	P		USA	BRA	SMR	MON	CAN	MEX	FRA	GBR	GER	HUN	BEL	ITA	POR	ESP	JPN	AUS	12	6th
1991	Braun Tyrrell Honda	Tyrrell 020	Honda RA101E; V10	P	(Japan) Satoru Nakajima	5	Ret	Ret	Ret	10	12	Ret	8	Ret	15	Ret	Ret	13	17	Ret	Ret	12	6th
1991	Braun Tyrrell Honda	Tyrrell 020	Honda RA101E; V10	P	(Italy) Stefano Modena	4	Ret	Ret	Ret	2	11	Ret	7	13	12	Ret	Ret	Ret	16	6	10	12	6th
1992	Tyrrell Racing Organisation	Tyrrell 020B	Ilmor LH10; V10	G		RSA	MEX	BRA	ESP	SMR	MON	CAN	FRA	GBR	GER	HUN	BEL	ITA	POR	JPN	AUS	8	6th
1992	Tyrrell Racing Organisation	Tyrrell 020B	Ilmor LH10; V10	G	(France) Olivier Grouillard	Ret	Ret	Ret	Ret	8	Ret	12	11	11	Ret	Ret	Ret	Ret	Ret	Ret	Ret	8	6th
1992	Tyrrell Racing Organisation	Tyrrell 020B	Ilmor LH10; V10	G	(Italy) Andrea de Cesaris	Ret	5	Ret	Ret	14	Ret	5	Ret	Ret	Ret	8	8	6	9	4	Ret	8	6th
1993	Tyrrell Racing Organisation	Tyrrell 020C	Yamaha OX10A; V10	G		RSA	BRA	EUR	SMR	ESP	MON	CAN	FRA	GBR	GER	HUN	BEL	ITA	POR	JPN	AUS	0	NC
1993	Tyrrell Racing Organisation	Tyrrell 020C	Yamaha OX10A; V10	G	(Japan) Ukyo Katayama	Ret	Ret	Ret	Ret	Ret	Ret	17	Ret	13								0	NC
1993	Tyrrell Racing Organisation	Tyrrell 020C	Yamaha OX10A; V10	G	(Italy) Andrea de Cesaris	Ret	Ret	Ret	Ret	DSQ	10	Ret	15									0	NC
