= Tyrrell 021 =

Formula One racing car

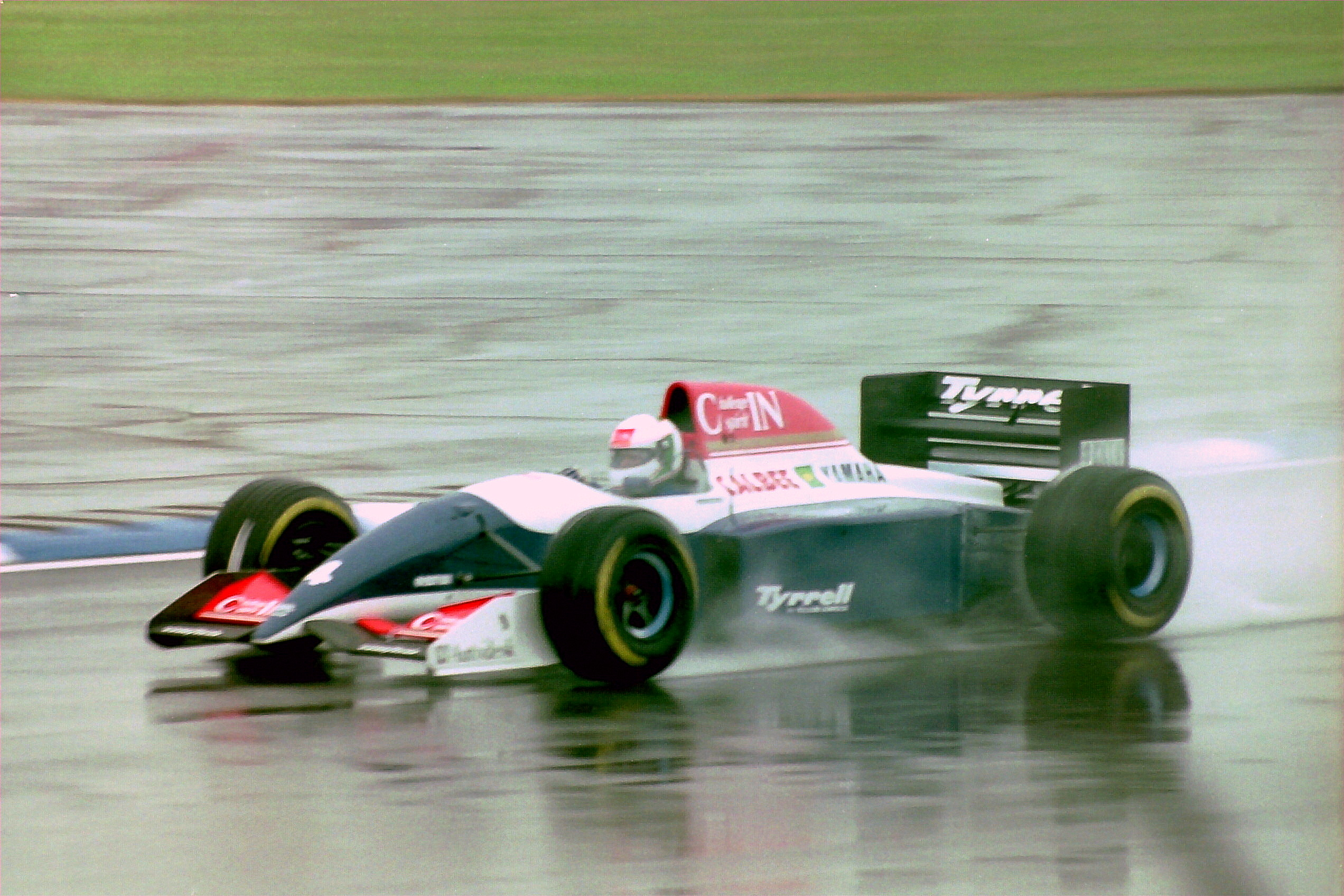
- Andrea de Cesaris practicing for the 1993 British Grand Prix
- Category: Formula One
- Constructor: Tyrrell Racing Organisation
- Designer: Mike Coughlan
- Predecessor: 020C
- Successor: 022

Technical specifications
- Chassis: Carbon fibre monocoque
- Suspension (front): Double wishbone with pullrod operated coil springs
- Suspension (rear): Double wishbone with pullrod operated coil springs
- Engine: 1993: mid-engine, longitudinally mounted, 3,493 cc (213.2 cu in), Yamaha OX10A, 72° V10, NA
- Transmission: Hewland 6-speed sequential semi-automatic
- Fuel: BP
- Tyres: Goodyear

Competition history
- Notable entrants: Tyrrell Racing Organisation
- Notable drivers: 3. (Japan) Ukyo Katayama; 4. (Italy) Andrea de Cesaris
- Debut: 1993 British Grand Prix
- Last event: 1993 Australian Grand Prix
Races	Wins	Poles	F/Laps
8	0	0	0
- Constructors' Championships: 0
- Drivers' Championships: 0

The Tyrrell 021 was a Formula One racing car designed by Mike Coughlan for Tyrrell Racing and raced during the 1993 season. The car was powered by a Yamaha V10 engine and was driven by Ukyo Katayama and Andrea de Cesaris. The car was unsuccessful with no points scored during the season. The 021 was replaced by the Harvey Postlethwaite designed 022 for the 1994 season.

== Complete Formula One results ==
(key)

Year	Team	Engine	Tyres	Drivers	1	2	3	4	5	6	7	8	9	10	11	12	13	14	15	16	Points	WCC
1993	Tyrrell	Yamaha OX10A; V10	G		RSA	BRA	EUR	SMR	ESP	MON	CAN	FRA	GBR	GER	HUN	BEL	ITA	POR	JPN	AUS	0	NC
1993	Tyrrell	Yamaha OX10A; V10	G	(Japan) Ukyo Katayama										Ret	10	15	14	Ret	Ret	Ret	0	NC
1993	Tyrrell	Yamaha OX10A; V10	G	(Italy) Andrea de Cesaris									NC	Ret	11	Ret	13	12	Ret	13	0	NC
