= Tyrrell 024 =

Formula One racing car

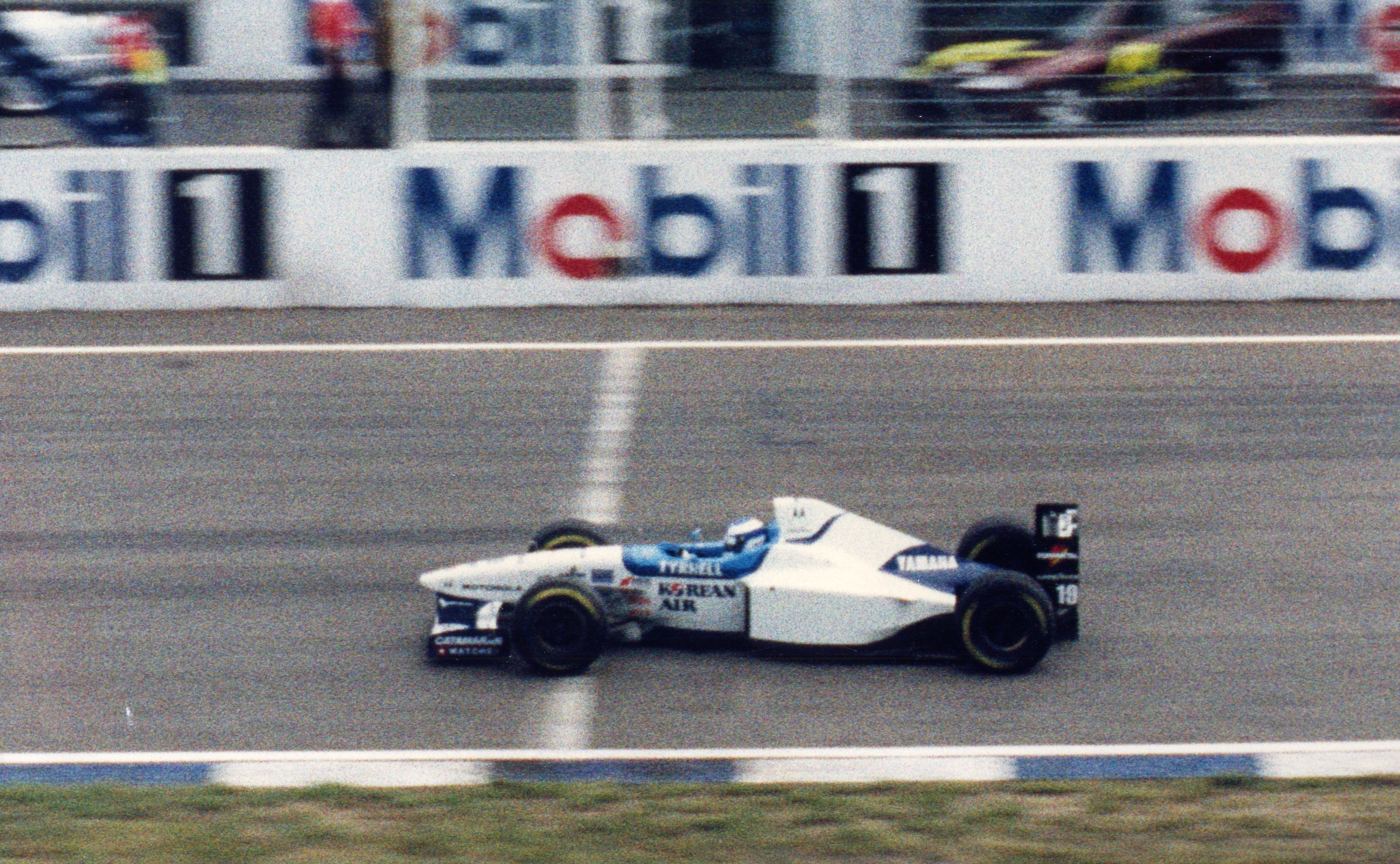
- Mika Salo driving the 024 at the 1996 German Grand Prix
- Category: Formula One
- Constructor: Tyrrell
- Designers: Harvey Postlethwaite (Technical Director); Mike Gascoyne (Chief Designer)
- Predecessor: 023
- Successor: 025

Technical specifications
- Chassis: carbon-fibre and honeycomb composite structure
- Suspension (front): combined spring and damper unit operated by pushrod and rocker, third spring
- Suspension (rear): combined spring and damper unit operated by pushrod and rocker, third spring
- Engine: Yamaha OX11A 72-degree V10
- Transmission: Tyrrell six-speed longitudinal sequential semi-automatic
- Fuel: Nippon Oil
- Tyres: Goodyear

Competition history
- Notable entrants: Tyrrell Yamaha
- Notable drivers: 18. (Japan) Ukyo Katayama; 19. (Finland) Mika Salo
- Debut: 1996 Australian Grand Prix
- Last event: 1996 Japanese Grand Prix
Races	Wins	Poles	F/Laps
16	0	0	0
- Constructors' Championships: 0
- Drivers' Championships: 0

The Tyrrell 024 was the car with which the Tyrrell team competed in the 1996 Formula One World Championship. It was driven by Japanese Ukyo Katayama and Finn Mika Salo, who were in their fourth and second seasons with the team respectively.

== Overview ==
The car was a significant improvement over the ineffective 1995 model, prompting Salo to say that they shouldn't be talked about in the same day. However, the team's efforts were severely compromised by the unreliability of their Yamaha engines, a decision which resulted in the team switching to Ford V8 power for 1997.

Salo was generally impressive throughout the season, scoring vital points finishes on three occasions. He again overshadowed Katayama, who moved to Minardi for 1997.

The team eventually finished eighth in the Constructors' Championship, with five points.

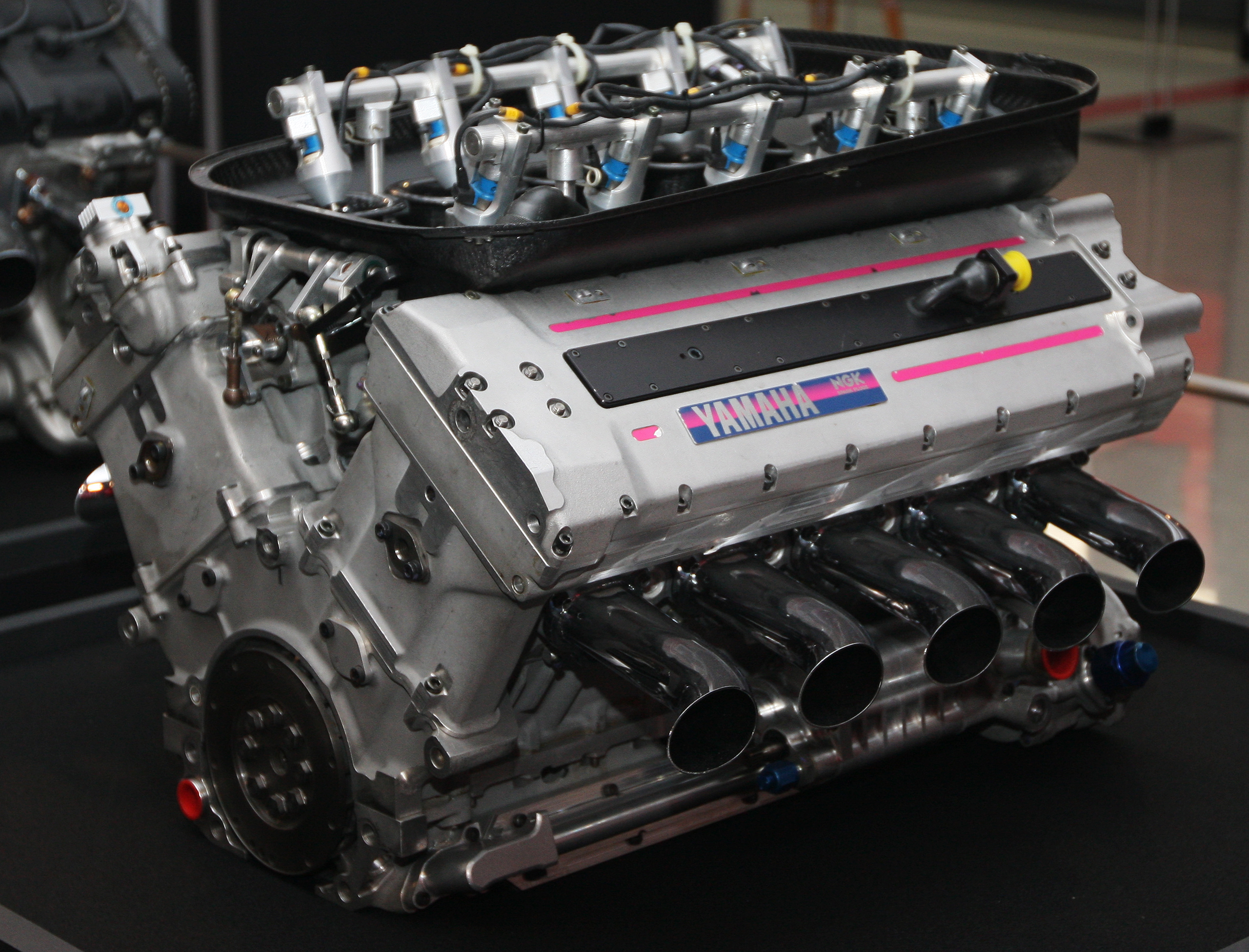
The Yamaha OX11A engine that powered the 024.

== Sponsorship and livery ==
The 024 retains the same white base livery with several changes on the blue scheme. During the pre-season test and launching, the only sponsor was their engine supplier Yamaha and wheel manufacturer Fondmetal. Due to funding shortage, the team losing several sponsors including Korean Air which would moved to Benetton the following season and their main sponsor, Nokia which was replaced with Motorola as a minor sponsor. Because it had a lot of blank spaces, the sponsors were placed improperly.

In the Grands Prix that did not allow tobacco branding, the Mild Seven logos were replaced with "Tyrrell".

== Complete Formula One results ==
(key) (results in bold indicate pole position)

Year	Team	Engine	Tyres	Drivers	1	2	3	4	5	6	7	8	9	10	11	12	13	14	15	16	Points	WCC
1996	Tyrrell	Yamaha V10	**G**		AUS	BRA	ARG	EUR	SMR	MON	ESP	CAN	FRA	GBR	GER	HUN	BEL	ITA	POR	JPN	**5**	**8th**
1996	Tyrrell	Yamaha V10	**G**	Ukyo Katayama	11	9	Ret	DSQ	Ret	Ret	Ret	Ret	Ret	Ret	Ret	7	8	10	12	Ret	**5**	**8th**
1996	Tyrrell	Yamaha V10	**G**	Mika Salo	6	5	Ret	DSQ	Ret	5	DSQ	Ret	10	7	9	Ret	7	Ret	11	Ret	**5**	**8th**
