= Ukyo Katayama =

Japanese racing driver (born 1963)

- 片山 右京
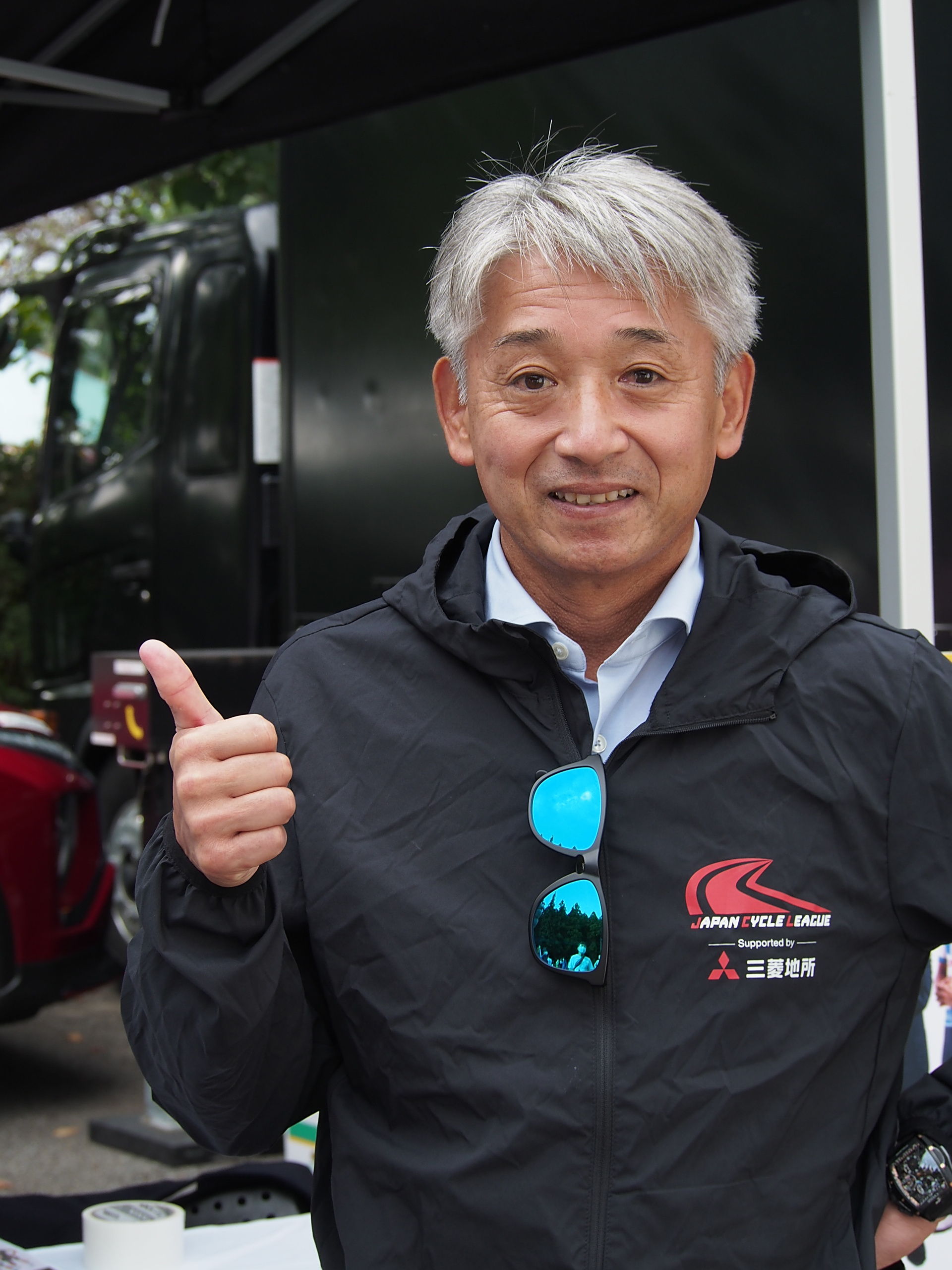
- Katayama in 2022
- Born: 29 May 1963 (age 63); Tokyo, Japan

Formula One World Championship career
- Nationality: (Japan) Japanese
- Active years: 1992–1997
- Team(s): Larrousse, Tyrrell, Minardi
- Entries: 97 (95 starts)
- Championships: 0
- Wins: 0
- Podiums: 0
- Career points: 5
- Pole positions: 0
- Fastest laps: 0
- First entry: 1992 South African Grand Prix
- Last entry: 1997 European Grand Prix

24 Hours of Le Mans career
- Years: 1988, 1992, 1998–1999, 2002–2003
- Teams: Courage, Toyota, Pescarolo, Kondo
- Best finish: 2nd (1999)
- Class wins: 1 (1999)

Ukyo Katayama (Japanese: 片山 右京, Hepburn: Katayama Ukyō; born 29 May 1963) is a Japanese former racing driver and motorsport executive, who competed in Formula One from 1992 to 1997.

Katayama participated in 97 Grands Prix, debuting at the 1992 South African Grand Prix, making him the sport's second most experienced Japanese driver. He scored a total of five championship points, all of them for the Tyrrell team in 1994. Katayama also competed in the 1999 24 Hours of Le Mans, finishing second overall and leading the GTP class. He has managed the Japanese continental cycling team Team UKYO since 2012.

== Biography ==
Born in Tokyo, Katayama spent three years racing in France before returning home in 1988 to enter the Japanese F3000. He scored three podiums in 1990, and won the championship in 1991 with two wins and three second places.

=== Formula One ===
His sponsors, Japan Tobacco, arranged a Formula One seat for Katayama in 1992 with Cabin brand, with the Larrousse team. The car was unreliable and a distinct midfielder, with team-mate Bertrand Gachot getting the lion's share of the team's meagre resources. However, Katayama impressed by running in fifth at the Canadian GP until his engine blew, but was eventually left with a brace of ninth places as his best result.

Japan Tobacco managed to arrange a switch to Tyrrell for 1993, but the team were at a low, with the interim 020C essentially three years old, and the new 021 proving uncompetitive. tenth place at the Hungarian GP was his best result.

1994 was to see a considerable turnaround for Tyrrell and Katayama. He impressed with the new 022, with three points-scoring finishes, a number of good qualifying performances, and generally being faster than his more experienced and acclaimed team-mate Mark Blundell. He was consistently a top-six runner, but the car proved to be unreliable, leading him to 12 retirements, including the German GP, in which he was running third before his throttle stuck open. However, in the four races that he did finish, he scored two fifth places, one sixth, and one seventh, good enough for five World Championship points.

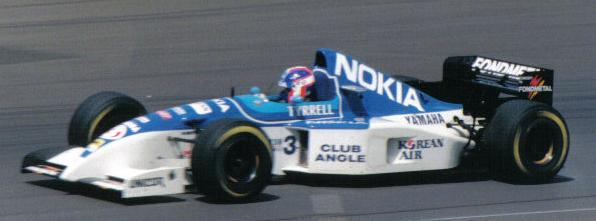
Katayama driving for Tyrrell at the 1995 British Grand Prix.

After his 1994 performance, Katayama was allegedly offered a contract with Benetton for the 1995 season alongside World Champion Michael Schumacher, but in Katayama's words, "he couldn't sign it". It would later emerge that in 1994 he had been diagnosed with cancer in his back; while non-threatening, it was painful, and his Grand Prix commitments delayed treatment. Katayama did not announce this until he retired from Formula One, not wanting anyone's sympathy to make excuses for him.

Katayama stayed on with Tyrrell for the next two seasons, but suffered a loss of form, with two seventh places in high-attrition races his best results, thus scoring no points whilst being outpaced by rookie team-mate Mika Salo. At the 1996 Belgian Grand Prix he finished on the lead lap for the single time in his Formula One career. During these years, he was highly disadvantaged by the regulation changes which led to higher cockpit sides, a response to the death of Ayrton Senna at the 1994 San Marino GP.

After leaving Tyrrell, Katayama's Mild Seven (another brand of Japan Tobacco) backing landed him a seat at Minardi, but they too were at a low ebb, and two tenth places were his best result. At his home Grand Prix, he emotionally announced his retirement from Formula One.

=== After Formula One ===
==== As a racing driver ====
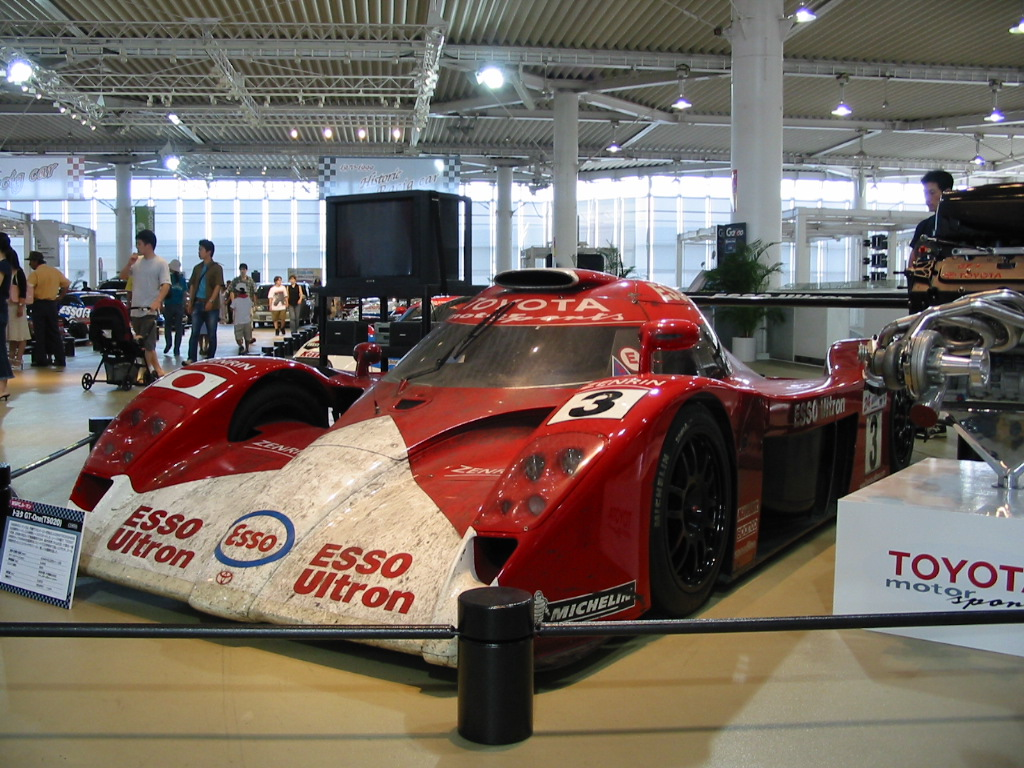
Katayama's Toyota GT-One for the 1999 24 Hours of Le Mans.

Still popular in his homeland, Katayama has since dabbled in sportscars and GT racing, as well as his other love of mountaineering. One of his most notable performances post F1 was at the 1999 24 Hours of Le Mans, when during the last hour, as he was lapping traffic and closing up to the leading BMW in his Toyota GT-One, shared with compatriots Keiichi Tsuchiya and Toshio Suzuki, his car suffered a tyre blowout and, while he managed to keep the car on the track, he was forced to slowly make his way around the track to return to the pits for a new set. In the process, the GT-One lost the chance to contend with the BMW. The lone GT-One would come home second overall. Still, the GT-One won the GTP class, although it was the only car in that class to actually finish the race.

In 2008, Katayama was one of several retired F1 drivers to compete in the new Speedcar Series.

==== As a team manager ====
In year 2000, Katayama established Team UKYO motor sport team. The team originally participated in JGTC in 2001–2002 in the GT500 class in a collaboration with Cerumo, competing as the No. 33 team with Katayama and future team owner Masahiko Kondo as its drivers. The team left the series after the 2002 season before returning in 2011 to lead Goodsmile Racing's GT300 program. Katayama led the team to three GT300 titles in 2011, 2014, and 2017.

The team also took part in the Dakar Rally in 2002-2005 and 2007.

Team UKYO is participating in the road bicycle racing as a UCI Continental cycling team starting from 2012.

==== As a mountain climber ====
Katayama is a lover of mountain climbing. He has often been climbing mountains since his F1 era.

In 2001, Katayama climbed the world's sixth-highest mountain, Cho Oyu. On 1 December 2006, it was reported that he had achieved his lifetime ambition of climbing Manaslu, the eighth-highest mountain in the world, after an unsuccessful attempt in 2004.

On 18 December 2009, it was reported that Katayama had been missing whilst climbing Mount Fuji with two friends. Upon calling a police search and rescue team, they informed the police that one of their climbing party had died, and another was presumed to be dying. Eventually, Katayama was found alive while two fellow climbers were found dead.

As of the end of 2010, Katayama had summited six of the Seven Summits: Mont Blanc (climbed in 1996), Kilimanjaro (1998), Elbrus (1998), Denali (2008), Aconcagua (2009), and Vinson Massif (2010)

==== Other sports ====
Katayama has been participating other sporting events as an official invitee, such as Honolulu Marathon and Honolulu Century Ride.

==== Media appearances ====
Katayama is now a commentator of Formula One in Japan, for Fuji TV. He also co-hosts the motoring program Samurai Wheels for NHK World. In 1996 he was a guest judge on Iron Chef.

== Helmet ==
Katayama's helmet was blue with a red and white stripe crossing the rear area and going in the sides forming an oblique letter T, and a vertical red and white stripe going across the top (until the visor).

== Racing record ==
=== Career summary ===
| Season | Series | Team | Races | Wins | Poles | F/Laps | Podiums | Points | Position |
|---|---|---|---|---|---|---|---|---|---|
| 1983 | Japanese FJ1600 Championship – Class B | ? | 5 | 1 | 1 | ? | ? | ? | **1st** |
| 1984 | Japanese FJ1600 Championship – Class A | ? | 6 | ? | ? | ? | ? | ? | **1st** |
| 1985 | Japanese Formula Three | Hasemi Motorsports | 7 | 0 | 0 | ? | 0 | 38 | 6th |
| 1986 | Championnat de France Formule Renault Turbo | Autolook Racing | 6 | 0 | 1 | 0 | 1 | 23 | 11th |
| 1986 | French Formula Three | Autolook Racing | 5 | 0 | 0 | 0 | 0 | 0 | NC |
| 1987 | French Formula Three | Autolook RG Project | 4 | 0 | 0 | 0 | 0 | 0 | NC |
| 1988 | Japanese Formula 3000 | Ba-Tsu Racing Team | 8 | 0 | 0 | 0 | 0 | 2 | 11th |
| 1988 | 24 Hours of Le Mans | Courage Compétition | 1 | 0 | 0 | 0 | 0 | N/A | DNF |
| 1989 | Japanese Formula 3000 | Footwork Formula | 7 | 0 | 0 | 0 | 0 | 0 | NC |
| 1989 | International Formula 3000 | Footwork | 2 | 0 | 0 | 0 | 0 | 0 | NC |
| 1990 | Japanese Formula 3000 | Cabin Racing Team with Heroes | 10 | 0 | 0 | 1 | 3 | 18 | 5th |
| 1991 | Japanese Formula 3000 | Cabin Racing Team with Heroes | 10 | 2 | 3 | 2 | 5 | 40 | **1st** |
| 1992 | Formula One | Central Park Venturi Larrousse | 14 | 0 | 0 | 0 | 0 | 0 | NC |
| 1992 | 24 Hours of Le Mans | Toyota Team Tom's | 1 | 0 | 0 | 0 | 0 | N/A | DNF |
| 1993 | Formula One | Tyrrell Racing Organisation | 16 | 0 | 0 | 0 | 0 | 0 | NC |
| 1994 | Formula One | Tyrrell Racing Organisation | 16 | 0 | 0 | 0 | 0 | 5 | 17th |
| 1995 | Formula One | Nokia Tyrrell Yamaha | 16 | 0 | 0 | 0 | 0 | 0 | NC |
| 1996 | Formula One | Tyrrell Yamaha | 16 | 0 | 0 | 0 | 0 | 0 | NC |
| 1997 | Formula One | Minardi Team | 17 | 0 | 0 | 0 | 0 | 0 | NC |
| 1998 | 24 Hours of Le Mans | Toyota Motorsport | 1 | 0 | 0 | 0 | 0 | N/A | 9th |
| 1999 | All Japan Grand Touring Car Championship | Toyota Castrol Team Tom's | 6 | 0 | 1 | 0 | 2 | 28 | 15th |
| 1999 | 24 Hours of Le Mans | Toyota Motorsport | 1 | 0 | 0 | 0 | 1 | N/A | **2nd** |
| 2000 | All Japan Grand Touring Car Championship | Nismo | 6 | 0 | 0 | 0 | 1 | 31 | 11th |
| 2001 | All Japan Grand Touring Car Championship | Racing Team Cerumo With Ukyo | 6 | 0 | 1 | 0 | 0 | 0 | NC |
| 2002 | All Japan Grand Touring Car Championship | Racing Team Cerumo | 2 | 0 | 0 | 0 | 0 | 2 | 27th |
| 2002 | 24 Hours of Le Mans | Pescarolo Sport | 1 | 0 | 0 | 0 | 0 | N/A | DNF |
| 2003 | 24 Hours of Le Mans | Kondo Racing | 1 | 0 | 0 | 0 | 0 | N/A | 13th |
| 2008 | Speedcar Series | Speedcar Team | 10 | 0 | 0 | 0 | 0 | 2 | 15th |

=== Complete 24 Hours of Le Mans results ===
| Year | Team | Co-Drivers | Car | Class | Laps | Pos. | Class Pos. |
|---|---|---|---|---|---|---|---|
| 1988 | (France) Courage Compétition | (France) Paul Belmondo (France) François Migault | Cougar C22-Porsche | C1 | 66 | DNF | DNF |
| 1992 | (Japan) Toyota Team Tom's | (United Kingdom) Geoff Lees (Australia) David Brabham | Toyota TS010 | C1 | 192 | DNF | DNF |
| 1998 | (Japan) Toyota Motorsports (Germany) Toyota Team Europe | (Japan) Toshio Suzuki (Japan) Keiichi Tsuchiya | Toyota GT-One | GT1 | 326 | 9th | 8th |
| 1999 | (Japan) Toyota Motorsports (Germany) Toyota Team Europe | (Japan) Keiichi Tsuchiya (Japan) Toshio Suzuki | Toyota GT-One | LMGTP | 364 | **2nd** | **1st** |
| 2002 | (France) Pescarolo Sport | (France) Éric Hélary (France) Stéphane Ortelli | Courage C60-Peugeot | LMP900 | 144 | DNF | DNF |
| 2003 | (Japan) Kondo Racing | (Japan) Masahiko Kondo (Japan) Ryo Fukuda | Dome S101-Mugen | LMP900 | 322 | 13th | 8th |

=== Complete Japanese Formula 3000 results ===
(key)

| Year | Entrant | 1 | 2 | 3 | 4 | 5 | 6 | 7 | 8 | 9 | 10 | 11 | DC | Points |
|---|---|---|---|---|---|---|---|---|---|---|---|---|---|---|
| 1988 | Ba-Tsu Racing Team | SUZ; 11 | FUJ; Ret | MIN; Ret | SUZ; 7 | SUG; 5 | FUJ; 8 | SUZ; 12 | SUZ; Ret | | | | 11th | 2 |
| 1989 | Footwork Formula | SUZ; 9 | FUJ; Ret | MIN | SUZ; Ret | SUG; Ret | FUJ; 15 | SUZ; 18 | SUZ; 7 | | | | NC | 0 |
| 1990 | Cabin Racing Team with Heroes | SUZ; Ret | FUJ; 3 | MIN; 5 | SUZ; Ret | SUG; 12 | FUJ; 5 | FUJ; 2 | SUZ; 3 | FUJ; Ret | SUZ; DSQ | | 5th | 18 |
| 1991 | Cabin Racing Team with Heroes | **SUZ**; 1 | AUT; 4 | FUJ; 9 | MIN; Ret | **SUZ**; 1 | SUG; 6 | FUJ; 2 | **SUZ**; 2 | FUJ; C | SUZ; 10 | FUJ; 2 | **1st** | **40** |

=== Complete International Formula 3000 results ===
(key) (Races in bold indicate pole position; races in italics indicate fastest lap.)

| Year | Entrant | 1 | 2 | 3 | 4 | 5 | 6 | 7 | 8 | 9 | 10 | DC | Points |
|---|---|---|---|---|---|---|---|---|---|---|---|---|---|
| 1989 | Footwork | SIL; DNQ | VAL; Ret | PAU; DNQ | JER; 18 | PER | BRH | BIR | SPA | BUG | DIJ | NC | 0 |

=== Complete Formula One results ===
(key)

| Year | Team | Chassis | Engine | 1 | 2 | 3 | 4 | 5 | 6 | 7 | 8 | 9 | 10 | 11 | 12 | 13 | 14 | 15 | 16 | 17 | WDC | Points |
|---|---|---|---|---|---|---|---|---|---|---|---|---|---|---|---|---|---|---|---|---|---|---|
| 1992 | Central Park Venturi Larrousse | Venturi Larrousse LC92 | Lamborghini V12 | RSA; 12 | MEX; 12 | BRA; 9 | ESP; DNQ | SMR; Ret | MON; DNPQ | CAN; Ret | FRA; Ret | GBR; Ret | GER; Ret | HUN; Ret | BEL; 17 | ITA; 9 | POR; Ret | JPN; 11 | AUS; Ret | | NC | 0 |
| 1993 | Tyrrell Racing Organisation | Tyrrell 020C | Yamaha V10 | RSA; Ret | BRA; Ret | EUR; Ret | SMR; Ret | ESP; Ret | MON; Ret | CAN; 17 | FRA; Ret | GBR; 13 | | | | | | | | | NC | 0 |
| 1993 | Tyrrell Racing Organisation | Tyrrell 021 | Yamaha V10 | | | | | | | | | | GER; Ret | HUN; 10 | BEL; 15 | ITA; 14 | POR; Ret | JPN; Ret | AUS; Ret | | NC | 0 |
| 1994 | Tyrrell Racing Organisation | Tyrrell 022 | Yamaha V10 | BRA; 5 | PAC; Ret | SMR; 5 | MON; Ret | ESP; Ret | CAN; Ret | FRA; Ret | GBR; 6 | GER; Ret | HUN; Ret | BEL; Ret | ITA; Ret | POR; Ret | EUR; 7 | JPN; Ret | AUS; Ret | | 17th | 5 |
| 1995 | Nokia Tyrrell Yamaha | Tyrrell 023 | Yamaha V10 | BRA; Ret | ARG; 8 | SMR; Ret | ESP; Ret | MON; Ret | CAN; Ret | FRA; Ret | GBR; Ret | GER; 7 | HUN; Ret | BEL; Ret | ITA; 10 | POR; Ret | EUR | PAC; 14 | JPN; Ret | AUS; Ret | NC | 0 |
| 1996 | Tyrrell Yamaha | Tyrrell 024 | Yamaha V10 | AUS; 11 | BRA; 9 | ARG; Ret | EUR; DSQ | SMR; Ret | MON; Ret | ESP; Ret | CAN; Ret | FRA; Ret | GBR; Ret | GER; Ret | HUN; 7 | BEL; 8 | ITA; 10 | POR; 12 | JPN; Ret | | NC | 0 |
| 1997 | Minardi Team | Minardi M197 | Hart V8 | AUS; Ret | BRA; 18† | ARG; Ret | SMR; 11 | MON; 10 | ESP; Ret | CAN; Ret | FRA; 11 | GBR; Ret | GER; Ret | HUN; 10 | BEL; 14 | ITA; Ret | AUT; 11 | LUX; Ret | JPN; Ret | EUR; 17 | NC | 0 |

† Katayama did not finish the race, but was classified as he completed more than 90% of the race distance.

=== Complete JGTC results ===
(key)

| Year | Team | Car | Class | 1 | 2 | 3 | 4 | 5 | 6 | 7 | 8 | DC | Pts |
|---|---|---|---|---|---|---|---|---|---|---|---|---|---|
| 1999 | Toyota Castrol Team Tom's | Toyota Supra | GT500 | SUZ; 3 | FUJ | SUG; 11 | **MIN**; 2 | FUJ; 15 | TAI; 15 | MOT; 10 | | 15th | 28 |
| 2000 | Nismo | Nissan Skyline GT-R | GT500 | MOT | FUJ; 2 | SUG; 11 | FUJ; 6 | TAI; 11 | MIN; Ret | SUZ; 4 | | 11th | 31 |
| 2001 | Racing Team Cerumo With Ukyo | Toyota Supra | GT500 | TAI; 12 | FUJ; 14 | SUG; 13 | **FUJ**; 14 | MOT | SUZ; Ret | MIN; 13 | | NC | 0 |
| 2002 | Racing Team Cerumo | Toyota Supra | GT500 | TAI; 15 | FUJ | SUG; 9 | SEP | FUJ | MOT | MIN | SUZ | 27th | 2 |

Sporting positions
| Preceded by Kazuyoshi Hoshino | Japanese Formula 3000; Champion; 1991 | Succeeded by Mauro Martini |
