= 1995 European Grand Prix =

Formula One motor race, held 1995

Race 14 of 17 in the 1995 Formula One World Championship
← Previous race	Next race →
- The Nürburgring in its 1995 configuration

Race details
- Date: 1 October 1995
- Official name: XL Grand Prix of Europe
- Location: Nürburgring, Nürburg, Germany
- Course: Permanent racing facility
- Course length: 4.556 km (2.847 miles)
- Distance: 67 laps, 305.252 km (190.782 miles)
- Weather: Rain, later dried out, air temperature 11 °C (52 °F)
- Attendance: 90,000

Pole position
Driver	(United Kingdom) David Coulthard	Williams-Renault
- Time: 1:18.738

Fastest lap
Driver	(Germany) Michael Schumacher	Benetton-Renault
- Time: 1:21.180 on lap 57

Podium
First	(Germany) Michael Schumacher	Benetton-Renault
Second	(France) Jean Alesi	Ferrari
Third	(United Kingdom) David Coulthard	Williams-Renault

The 1995 European Grand Prix (formally the XL Grand Prix of Europe) was a Formula One motor race held on 1 October 1995 at the Nürburgring, Nürburg, Germany. It was the fourteenth race of the 1995 Formula One World Championship and the first to be held there since 1985. Michael Schumacher for the Benetton team won the 67-lap race starting from third position. Jean Alesi finished second in a Ferrari, with David Coulthard, who started the Grand Prix from pole position, third in a Williams car. This was also the last F1 race for three drivers: Massimiliano Papis, Gabriele Tarquini, and Jean-Denis Délétraz.

Damon Hill, Coulthard's teammate, started the race in second, but dropped down to third behind Schumacher on the opening lap. Hill remained behind Schumacher for the majority of the race, before losing his front wing in a collision with Alesi and dropping back due to the resultant pit stop. He then spun off the track on lap 58 when running in fourth position, leading to his retirement from the race. Alesi looked set to win the race after starting the race with dry weather slick tyres on a damp track, but was held up in lapped traffic and overtaken by Schumacher two laps before the end of the race.

Schumacher's win retained his position at the top of the Drivers' Championship, 27 points ahead of Hill. With three races remaining, Schumacher only required a further three points to secure the championship. Benetton were now 20 points ahead of Williams in the Constructors' Championship following Schumacher's win.

== Background ==
The race marked the return to the Formula One calendar for the Nürburgring track after being off the calendar since the 1985 season, due to commercial disputes involving the circuit's promoters. Its return to the World Championship schedule was facilitated by a surge of interest in the sport throughout Germany as a result of Michael Schumacher's drivers' title in 1994. The 1994 European Grand Prix the previous year had been held at the Circuito de Jerez in Spain, a late replacement for the cancelled Argentine Grand Prix. This would be the third time that Formula One would utilise the short GP-Strecke layout rather than the almost 23 kilometre Nordschleife layout which was used until 1976.

Heading into the European Grand Prix, the 14th race of the season, Benetton driver Schumacher was leading the Drivers' Championship with 72 points, ahead of Williams driver Damon Hill in second on 55. Behind them were Hill's teammate David Coulthard on 39, Schumacher's teammate Johnny Herbert on 38, and Ferrari driver Jean Alesi on 34 points. In the Constructors' Championship, Benetton were leading with 100 points, with Williams second on 88 and Ferrari third on 62.

There was one driver swap heading into the race: Gabriele Tarquini replaced Ukyo Katayama at Tyrrell, the latter driver choosing not to race on doctors' advice following a crash at the Portuguese Grand Prix earlier in the year. Katayama had sustained a strained neck and bruising in the crash, in which his car had rolled several times following a start line collision with Luca Badoer's Minardi.

Prior to the race weekend, Coulthard announced that he was moving to the McLaren team for the 1996 season. He had first signed a contract with McLaren in October 1994 before his full-time Williams drive for 1995 was confirmed, and his one-year deal with the latter was not renegotiated due to his McLaren commitment. McLaren also confirmed that Mika Häkkinen and Jan Magnussen would continue in their existing roles as race and test driver for the team respectively, leaving Mark Blundell without a team for 1996. Coulthard's deal was officially confirmed on the day of the race itself. Meanwhile, Coulthard's prospective replacement, Jacques Villeneuve, had tested a Williams for the first time since being confirmed as Hill's teammate for 1996, running for two days at the Monza circuit. The Jordan team had also announced that it would keep its driver pairing of Rubens Barrichello and Eddie Irvine for 1996 in the week before the race. However, Ferrari then announced that it had bought out Irvine's contract, and that he would be partnering Schumacher at the team for 1996. Jordan subsequently announced that Martin Brundle would move from the Ligier team to partner Barrichello instead.

Some teams brought upgrades to the cars into the race – the Williams team used the upgraded "B" versions of the FW17 chassis for the second time, after its début at the previous race in Portugal. McLaren also brought upgrades to coincide with the home race of their engine supplier, Mercedes. The team opted to amalgamate the "B" and "C" versions of its troublesome MP4/10 chassis, with a rear end and gearbox from the former. In addition, the Ferrari team brought a revised rear wing and sidepods for its 412T2 car, which both drivers agreed to be an improvement.

== Practice and qualifying ==
This was the first Formula One race to be held at the Nürburgring since the 1985 German Grand Prix, so an additional familiarisation session was held prior to the usual practice and qualifying sessions. In this session, Schumacher set a benchmark time of 1:20.418, ahead of Hill in second, Coulthard, Häkkinen, Heinz-Harald Frentzen (Sauber), Gerhard Berger (Ferrari) and the rest of the field. The drivers, were uninspired by the circuit: Schumacher described it as "dull" and "easy to learn, with no real challenges" and Coulthard predicted a processional race without much overtaking.

Two practice sessions were held before the race: on Friday morning and on Saturday morning. Both sessions lasted 1 hour and 45 minutes with weather conditions dry in the first session, but wet for the second session. Hill set the fastest time in the first session, posting a lap of 1:19.343, three-hundredths of a second quicker than teammate Coulthard in second place. The Benettons were third and fifth fastest; Schumacher ahead of Herbert, with Ferrari driver Gerhard Berger fourth, over a second behind Hill. Häkkinen rounded out the top six in his McLaren. The wet conditions for the second practice session meant that lap times were slower as there was less grip on the track. In the second session, Hill was again fastest with a time of 1:34.906. Coulthard was second, with Frentzen third in the Sauber, two seconds slower than Hill. The Ferraris were fourth and fifth, Berger in front of Alesi. Schumacher and Herbert were sixth and seventh respectively, with Barrichello eighth. Olivier Panis in the Ligier and Mika Salo in the Tyrrell rounded out the top ten, both three and a half seconds off the fastest lap time. Amongst the slower runners, Andrea Montermini suffered a worrying moment when his Pacific car shed its left-rear wheel, but he was able to return to his pit garage.

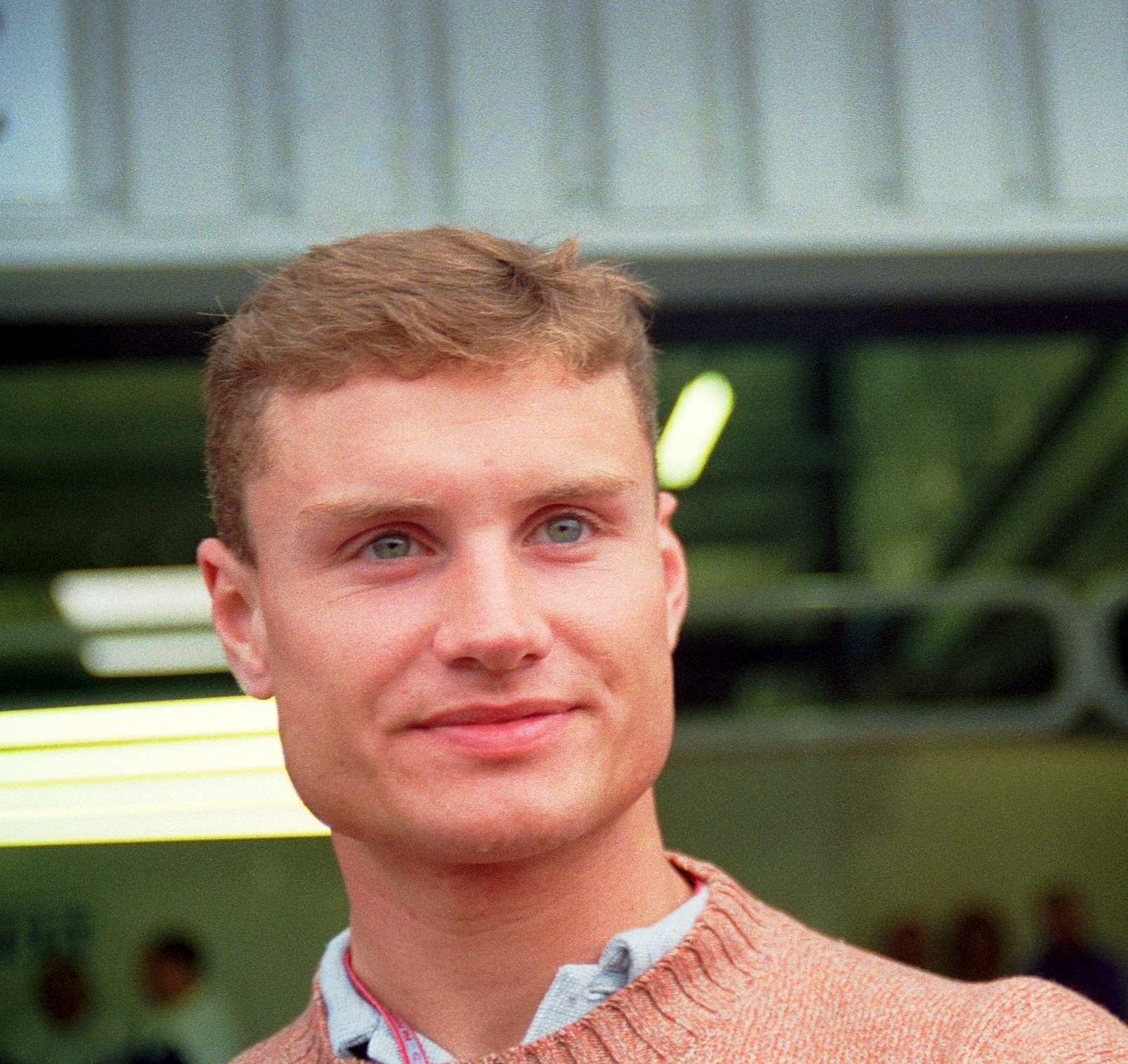
David Coulthard (pictured) took pole position in his Williams-Renault.

The qualifying session was split into two one-hour sessions; the first of which was held on Friday afternoon and the second on Saturday afternoon. The fastest time from either session counted towards the drivers' final grid positions. Both sessions were interrupted by rain, which led to little action on the track. Coulthard took his third consecutive pole position in his Williams, with a time of 1:18.738. He was joined on the front row by teammate Hill, who was two-tenths of a second behind. Schumacher was third in the Benetton, four-tenths of a second slower than Coulthard, despite lapping fastest in the second part of qualifying. The time he set in the second part of qualifying was still slower than Coulthard and Hill's time set in the first part and he was third quickest overall. Behind the leading three, Berger was fourth with teammate Alesi in sixth. Eddie Irvine in the Jordan finished in fifth position. Herbert and Frentzen were on the fourth row on the grid, in seventh and eighth. Despite bringing car upgrades to the event, Häkkinen and Blundell could only qualify their McLarens ninth and tenth respectively. Tarquini qualified in nineteenth, four places behind teammate Salo, but admitted to feeling out-of-practice by Formula One standards. Several drivers went off the track during qualifying in the difficult conditions, including Panis and Montermini. Panis' crash was caused by a stuck throttle; the resultant damage to the car forced him to switch to the team's spare monocoque. The conditions during the first session were generally faster, with seventeen of the 24 drivers setting their fastest qualifying times in this period.

Media attention focussed on Coulthard outperforming Hill in qualifying for the fourth time in a row. As Hill was mathematically the only possible contender to challenge Schumacher for the championship, there was a question from the media as to whether Williams should use team orders to give Hill pole position. In response, Coulthard said that he was "rather tired of questions about team orders", adding that "everyone wants to see is a motor race" and it wasn't fair of Williams to ask him to slow down if he was faster than Hill.

Following the session, Barrichello and Footwork driver Massimiliano Papis revealed that they expected to fail routine drugs tests they had just taken, as both had been taking decongestants, for nasal problems and a cold respectively, which contained the banned substance ephedrine. On Saturday, the team principals also met to discuss future changes to the sport: it was agreed that qualifying would be reduced to a single hour-long session for the 1996 season, and a reduction from seventeen to sixteen Grands Prix was confirmed.

=== Qualifying classification ===
Pos	No	Driver	Constructor	Q1 Time	Q2 Time	Gap
1	6	(United Kingdom) David Coulthard	Williams-Renault	1:18.738	1:19.913	—
2	5	(United Kingdom) Damon Hill	Williams-Renault	1:18.972	1:19.607	+0.234
3	1	(Germany) Michael Schumacher	Benetton-Renault	1:19.470	1:19.150	+0.412
4	28	(Austria) Gerhard Berger	Ferrari	1:19.821	1:21.083	+1.083
5	15	(United Kingdom) Eddie Irvine	Jordan-Peugeot	1:20.488	1:21.426	+1.750
6	27	(France) Jean Alesi	Ferrari	1:20.521	1:20.510	+1.772
7	2	(United Kingdom) Johnny Herbert	Benetton-Renault	1:20.653	1:21.236	+1.915
8	30	(Germany) Heinz-Harald Frentzen	Sauber-Ford	1:20.762	1:20.749	+2.011
9	8	(Finland) Mika Häkkinen	McLaren-Mercedes	1:20.866	1:20.968	+2.128
10	7	(United Kingdom) Mark Blundell	McLaren-Mercedes	1:20.909	1:21.583	+2.171
11	14	(Brazil) Rubens Barrichello	Jordan-Peugeot	1:21.350	1:21.211	+2.473
12	25	(United Kingdom) Martin Brundle	Ligier-Mugen-Honda	1:21.541	1:22.062	+2.803
13	29	(France) Jean-Christophe Boullion	Sauber-Ford	1:22.059	1:34.210	+3.321
14	26	(France) Olivier Panis	Ligier-Mugen-Honda	1:22.062	1:22.565	+3.324
15	4	(Finland) Mika Salo	Tyrrell-Yamaha	1:23.058	1:23.079	+4.320
16	23	(Portugal) Pedro Lamy	Minardi-Ford	1:23.328	1:24.087	+4.590
17	9	(Italy) Massimiliano Papis	Footwork-Hart	1:23.689	1:24.134	+4.951
18	24	(Italy) Luca Badoer	Minardi-Ford	1:23.760	1:26.406	+5.022
19	3	(Italy) Gabriele Tarquini	Tyrrell-Yamaha	1:24.286	1:24.352	+5.548
20	17	(Italy) Andrea Montermini	Pacific-Ford	1:24.696	1:26.102	+5.958
21	10	(Japan) Taki Inoue	Footwork-Hart	1:26.667	1:24.900	+6.162
22	21	(Brazil) Pedro Diniz	Forti-Ford	1:25.647	1:25.157	+6.419
23	22	(Brazil) Roberto Moreno	Forti-Ford	1:26.784	1:26.098	+7.360
24	16	(Switzerland) Jean-Denis Délétraz	Pacific-Ford	1:27.853	1:29.677	+9.115

== Race ==
The track surface for the start of the race was damp, but dried up as the race progressed. The drivers were scheduled to go onto the track at 09:30 CET (GMT +1) for a 30-minute warm-up session; however, the session was delayed until 10:05 CET due to fog and heavy rain. Several drivers went off the track during the session due to the wet weather conditions. Both Williams cars maintained their good performance from qualifying; Coulthard had the fastest time of 1:38.378 whilst Hill was third in the other Williams. Berger split them in the Ferrari for second position. Schumacher completed the top four, six-tenths of a second behind Coulthard. Approximately 90,000 spectators attended the circuit on race day.

Coulthard was forced to use the Williams spare car, which had been set up for Hill for the race itself after he spun off the track during his reconnaissance lap, stalling the engine in the process. The race was scheduled to start at 14:00 CET, but Papis stalled his Footwork in the starting lights procedure, resulting in the start being aborted, with a new start time of 14:05 CET being planned. Many of the teams started the race with wet weather tyres, but the Ferrari and McLaren teams chose to fit their cars with dry weather slick tyres. The Ferrari mechanics also raised the ride height and increased the downforce levels on Alesi and Berger's cars on the grid, making them more competitive in the wet conditions.

Coulthard, from pole position, held onto the lead into the first corner, while Hill made a bad start and was overtaken by Schumacher in the run down to the corner. Irvine also passed Hill, but was later overtaken on in the opening lap. Further down the order, Frentzen was judged to have made a false start, while Papis took up his normal grid position instead of starting from the back as he should have done after stalling. Both drivers were given ten-second stop-and-go penalties in the early stages of the race. Papis' teammate, Taki Inoue, failed to take the start due to an electronic failure.

The McLarens and Berger's Ferrari slipped back in the early laps of the race, with both McLarens overtaken by the Pacific and Forti cars as they dropped down the order. The McLaren chassis handled badly in the wet conditions, while the throttle response of the Mercedes engine was also too abrupt to be driven effectively in the rain. Berger dropped to ninth place suffering from an incorrectly pressured set of tyres that left him with a handling imbalance. Alesi moved up to fourth position, overtaking Herbert on lap five and Irvine on lap eight. Berger and the McLarens moved back up the order as drivers made a pit stop for slick tyres. As the front-runners made their stops, Alesi ended up twenty seconds ahead of Coulthard, Schumacher and Hill. By the end of lap 17, most of the drivers had pitted for slick tyres and the running order had stabilised as Alesi led ahead of Coulthard, Schumacher, Hill, Berger and Irvine. Frentzen was outside the points in seventh, but on the next lap he collided with Pedro Diniz's Forti while trying to lap him, retiring from the race as a result. Panis and Blundell were also out by this stage, both having spun off the track on lap 15.

Near the front of the field, Hill was faster than third-placed Schumacher and began to catch him. Schumacher defended his position vigorously several times, but Hill eventually passed him. However, Hill then ran wide at the final corner and Schumacher overtook him. Coulthard, in the other Williams, began to suffer from excessive oversteer with his car's handling, dropping to fourth behind Schumacher and Hill, who passed him on laps 21 and 23 respectively. As Schumacher and the Williams drivers battled for position, Alesi was able to extend his lead at the front to 45 seconds. On lap 34 Alesi made his only pit stop, while Schumacher made his second of three scheduled pit visits. Alesi exited from pits just in front of third-placed Hill, who attempted to overtake Alesi on lap 40, the lap before his own pit stop was due to take place. In the process, the two cars made contact and Hill lost his front wing and had to pit to replace the damaged wing, losing time while driving around the track with his damaged car and rejoined behind Coulthard in fourth position. On the same lap, Berger retired with terminal engine problems. After his stop, Hill pushed hard in an attempt to catch Coulthard, but spun out of the race on lap 58. The impact with the tyre barrier was hard enough to cause a minor crack to a bone in his leg, but he escaped serious injury.

Schumacher made his final pit stop on lap 52 from second place, having caught up with Alesi during his third stint. He rejoined some distance behind the Ferrari, but set a fastest lap of 1:21.180 on lap 58, almost 1.7 seconds faster than Alesi's fastest lap of the race. Alesi's attempts to keep the lead were not helped by lapped traffic getting in his way, as well as losing five seconds at the Veedol chicane by running wide onto the gravel. In the closing laps, Schumacher caught Alesi, overtaking him on the outside of the chicane on lap 65. Schumacher opened the gap to two and a half seconds, and won the race after 67 laps to secure his seventh victory of the season in a time of 1:39:59.044.

Hill, watching from the side of the track, applauded Schumacher's win. Schumacher attempted to stop his car to give Hill a lift back to the pitlane, but was unable due to a slipping clutch. Alesi held position to finish second in his Ferrari, with Coulthard third – 35 seconds behind. Completing the points-scorers, Barrichello finished fourth, ahead of Herbert and Irvine. The latter two had battled for much of the race: they collided on lap 31, dropping both behind Barrichello and causing Herbert to make a pit stop for a new front wing; later, Irvine spun while attempting to lap Papis, allowing Herbert back in front. Outside the points, Brundle finished seventh for Ligier, ahead of the recovering Häkkinen, whose eighth position, two laps down on Schumacher, was a major disappointment for Mercedes in its home country. Minardi drivers Pedro Lamy and Luca Badoer finished ninth and eleventh, with Salo in tenth position, the latter making an unscheduled pit stop to change a punctured tyre after colliding with Jean-Christophe Boullion during the race. The Sauber driver retired as a result of damage sustained in this incident.

Papis, Diniz, Tarquini and Délétraz completed the field. Of the retirements, Roberto Moreno stopped his Forti with a driveshaft failure, while Montermini endured a fraught pitstop on lap 42. The Pacific team's fuel rig malfunctioned, and, in the confusion, refueller Paul Summerfield sustained a fractured left femur when he was hit by the car as it left its pit box. Montermini consequently ran out of fuel on lap 45.

As of 2023, this was the last race where a V12-engined car finished on the podium.

=== Race classification ===
Pos	No	Driver	Constructor	Laps	Time/Retired	Grid	Points
1	1	(Germany) Michael Schumacher	Benetton-Renault	67	1:39:59.044	3	10
2	27	(France) Jean Alesi	Ferrari	67	+ 2.684	6	6
3	6	(United Kingdom) David Coulthard	Williams-Renault	67	+ 35.382	1	4
4	14	(Brazil) Rubens Barrichello	Jordan-Peugeot	66	+ 1 Lap	11	3
5	2	(United Kingdom) Johnny Herbert	Benetton-Renault	66	+ 1 Lap	7	2
6	15	(United Kingdom) Eddie Irvine	Jordan-Peugeot	66	+ 1 Lap	5	1
7	25	(United Kingdom) Martin Brundle	Ligier-Mugen-Honda	66	+ 1 Lap	12	
8	8	(Finland) Mika Häkkinen	McLaren-Mercedes	65	+ 2 Laps	9	
9	23	(Portugal) Pedro Lamy	Minardi-Ford	64	+ 3 Laps	16	
10	4	(Finland) Mika Salo	Tyrrell-Yamaha	64	+ 3 Laps	15	
11	24	(Italy) Luca Badoer	Minardi-Ford	64	+ 3 Laps	18	
12	9	(Italy) Massimiliano Papis	Footwork-Hart	64	+ 3 Laps	17	
13	21	(Brazil) Pedro Diniz	Forti-Ford	62	+ 5 Laps	22	
14	3	(Italy) Gabriele Tarquini	Tyrrell-Yamaha	61	+ 6 Laps	19	
15	16	(Switzerland) Jean-Denis Délétraz	Pacific-Ford	60	+ 7 Laps	24	
Ret	5	(United Kingdom) Damon Hill	Williams-Renault	58	Spun Off	2	
Ret	17	(Italy) Andrea Montermini	Pacific-Ford	45	Out of Fuel	20	
Ret	29	(France) Jean-Christophe Boullion	Sauber-Ford	44	Collision	13	
Ret	28	(Austria) Gerhard Berger	Ferrari	40	Gearbox	4	
Ret	22	(Brazil) Roberto Moreno	Forti-Ford	22	Halfshaft	23	
Ret	30	(Germany) Heinz-Harald Frentzen	Sauber-Ford	17	Collision	8	
Ret	26	(France) Olivier Panis	Ligier-Mugen-Honda	14	Spun Off	14	
Ret	7	(United Kingdom) Mark Blundell	McLaren-Mercedes	14	Accident	10	
Ret	10	(Japan) Taki Inoue	Footwork-Hart	0	Electrical	21	

== Post-race ==
"Today, I decided not to risk starting on slicks because the car felt so critical in these conditions and I wanted to play safe for the championship. When I saw Damon in the wall, I thought that now I had to decide to stay in second place or to push to win and my fans pushed me to try and win the race. When I passed Jean, he was making it as difficult as possible, but there was nothing dangerous or anything. He left room on the outside and we did touch. For me, it is fantastic to win the German Grand Prix, the Belgian Grand Prix and the Monaco Grand Prix [this year] as well as this race in Germany. All four are 'home' events for me and I have been very lucky."

— Michael Schumacher, commenting on the race.

Journalist Alan Henry described the race as the best of the season to date, and even of recent memory, and suggested that Schumacher's performance could mark a watershed in which the German "crossed that indistinct dividing line separating the good from the great". Schumacher's win put him 27 points ahead of Hill in the Drivers' Championship, meaning he required only three more points from the remaining races of the season to win championship. Hill, meanwhile, would have to win all three Grands Prix, effectively meaning that the Championship was over.

Hill commented that "I am not going to be World Champion this year, but I'll be back. But I don't think I disgraced myself. I put up a good fight, did everything I could to win, and it didn't come off" and pledged to do his best to win the remaining races. Hill later said that the car's steering had felt stiff since his collision with Alesi, making it difficult to drive, but accepted the blame for his retirement from the race. In the weeks after the race, heavy criticism was directed towards Hill, in which BBC pundit Murray Walker felt that he had not been "forceful" enough in his battle with Schumacher. In an interview before the Pacific race, Brundle said that he needed to get more aggressive and "establish himself" as the number one driver at Williams.

Schumacher said that Hill only made "half-hearted attempts" to overtake during the race which led to him "getting into trouble". Alesi also blamed Hill for their collision, saying that "I do not know what happened with Damon [Hill]. I saw his nose alongside me, that's all. I was sideways [turning into the corner] and he hit me. He was too optimistic as normally you cannot do anything at that corner." At a Fédération Internationale de l'Automobile (FIA) World Motor Sport Council meeting on 19 October to discuss driver etiquette, they opted against introducing new rules on the issue. Formula One's governing body emphasised that the International Sporting Code would be enforced on the basis that drivers are free to drive as they wish "provided they do not deliberately endanger another driver or repeatedly obstruct him on a straight", following incidents during the year involving Hill and Schumacher.

Alesi, despite his performance in the early stages of the race, was also criticised for losing his lead after letting Schumacher gain time on him in the final laps. Ferrari designer John Barnard later blamed Alesi's hesitance in lapped traffic for the loss of time, the rate of which Henry described as "inexplicable". Alesi blamed his inability to fend off Schumacher on his worn tyres, which had completed half a race distance as opposed to Schumacher's fresher set and on being held up by Häkkinen and Brundle's battle for seventh position in the closing laps. Alesi was also given the instruction to save fuel with 15 laps to go, suggesting that his one-stop strategy was the incorrect choice.

On 2 November 1995, the FIA announced that none of the drivers who took part in the anti-doping tests at the Portuguese and European Grands Prix had tested positive, including Barrichello and Papis. However, FIA Formula One Safety and Medical Delegate, Professor Sid Watkins, subsequently argued that as ephedrine had no effect on a driver's ability, the sport should not use exactly the same list as the International Olympic Committee in the future.

== Championship standings after the race ==
Both Schumacher and Benetton retained their positions at the top of the Drivers' and Constructors' championships following the race.

Drivers' Championship standings

Pos	Driver	Points
1	(Germany) Michael Schumacher	82
2	(United Kingdom) Damon Hill	55
3	(United Kingdom) David Coulthard	43
4	(United Kingdom) Johnny Herbert	40
5	(France) Jean Alesi	40

Constructors' Championship standings

Pos	Constructor	Points
1	(United Kingdom) Benetton-Renault	112
2	(United Kingdom) Williams-Renault	92
3	(Italy) Ferrari	68
4	(United Kingdom) McLaren-Mercedes	21
5	(Republic of Ireland) Jordan-Peugeot	18

- Note: Only the top five positions are included for both sets of standings.

Previous race: 1995 Portuguese Grand Prix	FIA Formula One World Championship; 1995 season	Next race: 1995 Pacific Grand Prix
Previous race: 1994 European Grand Prix; Previous race at the Nürburgring: 1985 German Grand Prix	European Grand Prix	Next race: 1996 European Grand Prix
