= 1995 Canadian Grand Prix =

6th round of the 1995 Formula One season

Race 6 of 17 in the 1995 Formula One World Championship
← Previous race	Next race →

Race details
- Date: 11 June 1995
- Official name: XXXIII Grand Prix Molson du Canada
- Location: Circuit Gilles Villeneuve, Montreal, Quebec, Canada
- Course: Street circuit
- Course length: 4.430 km (2.753 miles)
- Distance: 68 laps, 301.240 km (187.182 miles)
- Scheduled distance: 69 laps, 305.670 km (189.935 miles)
- Weather: Cloudy at start, sunny later with temperatures reaching up to 24.3 °C (75.7 °F); Wind speeds up to 8 km/h (5.0 mph)

Pole position
Driver	(Germany) Michael Schumacher	Benetton-Renault
- Time: 1:27.661

Fastest lap
Driver	(Germany) Michael Schumacher	Benetton-Renault
- Time: 1:29.174 on lap 67

Podium
First	(France) Jean Alesi	Ferrari
Second	(Brazil) Rubens Barrichello	Jordan-Peugeot
Third	(United Kingdom) Eddie Irvine	Jordan-Peugeot

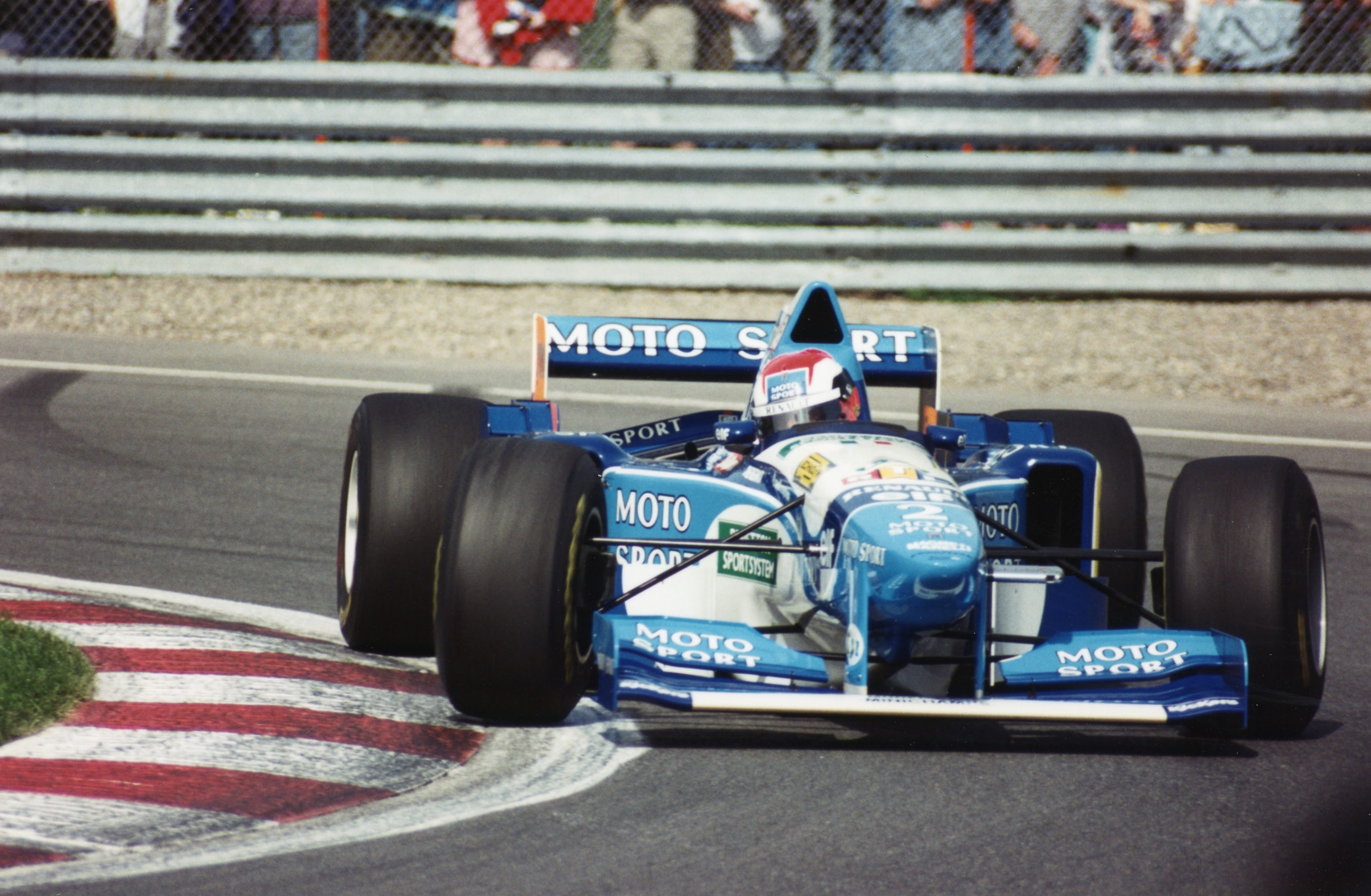
Johnny Herbert's Benetton-Renault during qualifying.

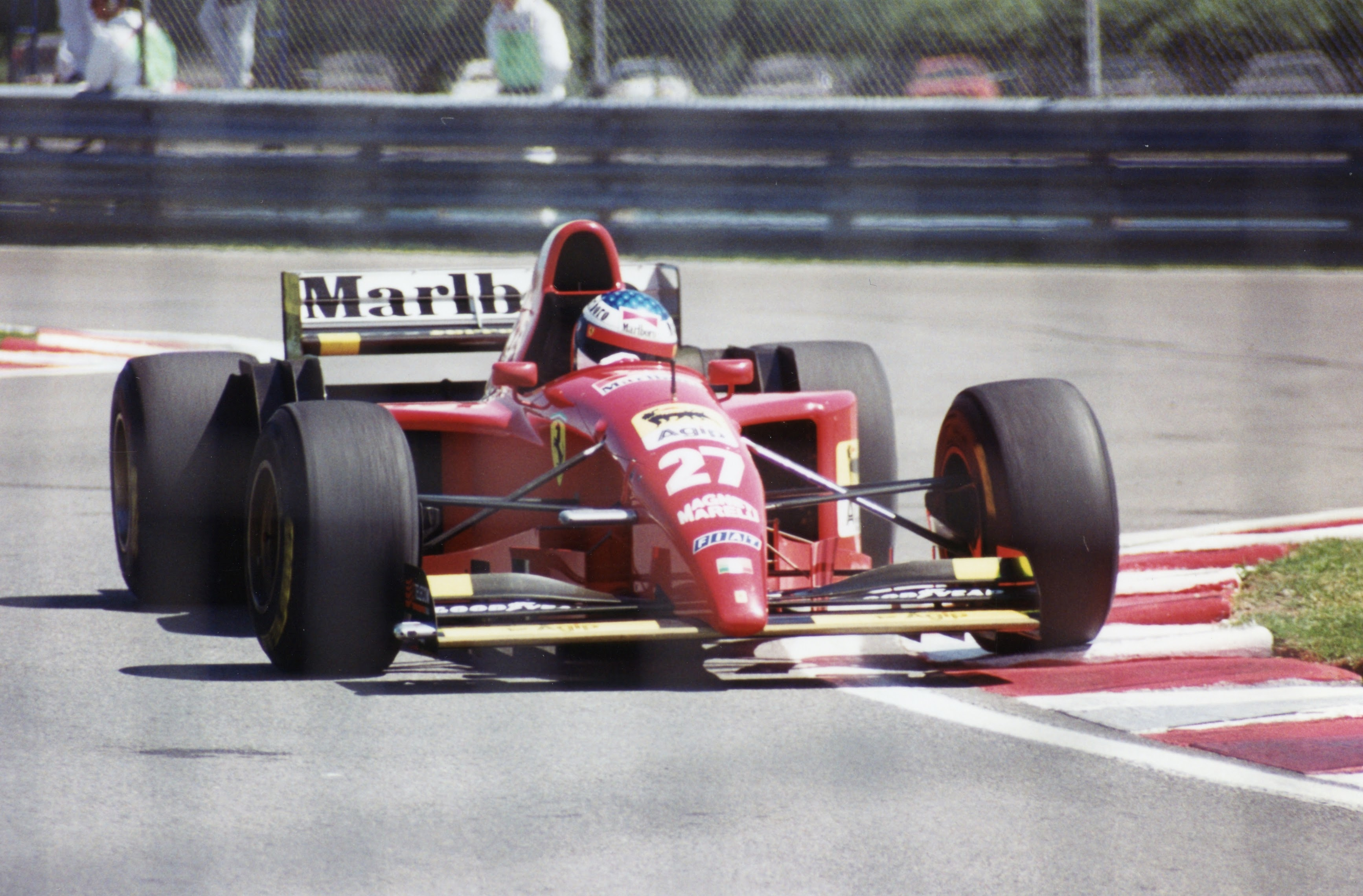
Jean Alesi scored the only win of his Formula One career on what was his 31st birthday.

The 1995 Canadian Grand Prix was a Formula One motor race held on 11 June 1995 at the Circuit Gilles Villeneuve, Montreal. It was the sixth race of the 1995 Formula One season.

It produced the only Grand Prix victory for French driver Jean Alesi. This was seen as a popular victory, as Alesi had waited over five years for a victory and he was driving the red number 27 Ferrari, as driven by Canadian Gilles Villeneuve. Adding to the victory was that the win also occurred on Alesi's 31st birthday. This race also marked the last time to date that a Grand Prix was won by a car with a V12 engine, as well as the only race of the season won by a non-Renault-powered car. By winning this race Ferrari surpassed McLaren as the most successful F1 constructor in number of wins.

Michael Schumacher led until a late problem with his gearbox necessitated a long pit stop. Several other regular front-runners had problems, allowing both Jordan drivers to finish on the podium for the first time in the team's history. Jordan had scored their first-ever GP points in Montreal four years earlier.

After Alesi crossed the finish line, race fans broke through the fences and charged the pit area. When Alesi entered the hairpin at the far end of the circuit on his victory lap, his car ran out of fuel, and Alesi removed his steering wheel, stood on top of the car and "surfed" it to a stop. Schumacher, approaching from behind, stopped and gave Alesi a lift back to the pits on top of his car.

Also, that Sunday evening, the first rumours started circulating that Michael Schumacher had signed a multimillion-dollar contract with Ferrari for 1996.

The race was run over 69 laps, but the results were declared after 68 laps because of crowd invasion just after Alesi had finished. In original results, Luca Badoer finished in 7th, ahead of Mika Salo who had stopped next to the pit wall to avoid hitting spectators.

== Report ==
=== Background ===
One thing that was noted in the build-up to the race weekend was the bumpiness of the circuit, with the drivers in the post-qualifying press conference noting that the circuit should be resurfaced. It was also noted that overtaking into the new chicane was banned, although the length of the ban was unclear, with Michael Schumacher and Damon Hill unclear whether the drivers were not allowed to overtake into the chicane for just the first lap, or for every lap.

=== Practice and qualifying ===
Schumacher's pole position was the 100th for a Renault powered car and the ninth of his career.

=== Race day ===
The 30-minute warm-up session was held in wet conditions, with rain constantly falling since the early morning, the first time rain had fallen over the Grand Prix weekend. Hill was one of the few drivers to make a mistake, spinning at the newly installed chicane. Hill's Williams teammate David Coulthard spun at the previous corner later in the session, while Bertrand Gachot also ran into the gravel trap. After a brief stay in the pits, an animated Hill went back onto the track, only to go off into the gravel trap, beaching his car. Due to the changing weather conditions, the order was mixed, with the Ferraris of Jean Alesi and Gerhard Berger in first and third. Rubens Barrichello split them in second, with Schumacher fourth. Mika Häkkinen was fifth. The Saubers of Heinz-Harald Frentzen and Jean-Christophe Boullion were 6th and 7th, with Luca Badoer in the Minardi rounding out the top 8. The two Williams drivers eventually finished in 12th and 16th.

The race started at 14:00 EDT (UTC−4). Michael Schumacher led for most of the race; however, an electrical problem with his Benetton-Renault towards the end of lap 57 forced him into the pits and allowed second-placed Jean Alesi to take the lead. The 70-second pit stop to change a steering wheel and perform an on-board computer adjustment meant that Schumacher rejoined the race in seventh place. He eventually made his way back to fifth place.

== Classification ==
=== Qualifying ===
Pos	No	Driver	Constructor	Q1	Q2	Gap
1	1	(Germany) Michael Schumacher	Benetton-Renault	1:27.661	1:27.708	—
2	5	(United Kingdom) Damon Hill	Williams-Renault	1:28.039	1:28.552	+0.378
3	6	(United Kingdom) David Coulthard	Williams-Renault	1:28.590	1:28.091	+0.430
4	28	(Austria) Gerhard Berger	Ferrari	1:28.247	1:28.189	+0.528
5	27	(France) Jean Alesi	Ferrari	1:28.525	1:28.474	+0.813
6	2	(United Kingdom) Johnny Herbert	Benetton-Renault	1:29.295	1:28.498	+0.837
7	8	(Finland) Mika Häkkinen	McLaren-Mercedes	1:29.406	1:28.910	+1.249
8	15	(United Kingdom) Eddie Irvine	Jordan-Peugeot	1:29.021	1:29.259	+1.360
9	14	(Brazil) Rubens Barrichello	Jordan-Peugeot	1:29.393	1:29.171	+1.510
10	7	(United Kingdom) Mark Blundell	McLaren-Mercedes	1:30.279	1:29.641	+1.980
11	26	(France) Olivier Panis	Ligier-Mugen-Honda	1:29.809	1:30.345	+2.148
12	30	(Germany) Heinz-Harald Frentzen	Sauber-Ford	1:30.285	1:30.017	+2.356
13	9	(Italy) Gianni Morbidelli	Footwork-Hart	1:30.854	1:30.159	+2.498
14	25	(United Kingdom) Martin Brundle	Ligier-Mugen-Honda	1:30.880	1:30.255	+2.594
15	4	(Finland) Mika Salo	Tyrrell-Yamaha	1:30.657	1:30.695	+2.996
16	3	(Japan) Ukyo Katayama	Tyrrell-Yamaha	1:31.958	1:31.382	+3.721
17	23	(Italy) Pierluigi Martini	Minardi-Ford	1:31.859	1:31.445	+3.784
18	29	(France) Jean-Christophe Boullion	Sauber-Ford	1:31.925	1:31.838	+4.177
19	24	(Italy) Luca Badoer	Minardi-Ford	1:32.453	1:31.853	+4.192
20	16	(France) Bertrand Gachot	Pacific-Ford	1:33.866	1:32.841	+5.180
21	17	(Italy) Andrea Montermini	Pacific-Ford	1:33.910	1:32.894	+5.233
22	10	(Japan) Taki Inoue	Footwork-Hart	1:32.995	—	+5.334
23	22	(Brazil) Roberto Moreno	Forti-Ford	1:34.000	1:35.559	+6.339
24	21	(Brazil) Pedro Diniz	Forti-Ford	1:36.187	1:34.982	+7.321

=== Race ===
Pos	No	Driver	Constructor	Laps	Time/Retired	Grid	Points
1	27	(France) Jean Alesi	Ferrari	68	1:44:54.171	5	10
2	14	(Brazil) Rubens Barrichello	Jordan-Peugeot	68	+31.477	9	6
3	15	(United Kingdom) Eddie Irvine	Jordan-Peugeot	68	+35.980	8	4
4	26	(France) Olivier Panis	Ligier-Mugen-Honda	68	+41.314	11	3
5	1	(Germany) Michael Schumacher	Benetton-Renault	68	+44.676	1	2
6	9	(Italy) Gianni Morbidelli	Footwork-Hart	67	+1 lap	13	1
7	4	(Finland) Mika Salo	Tyrrell-Yamaha	67	+1 lap	15	
8	24	(Italy) Luca Badoer	Minardi-Ford	67	+1 lap	19	
9	10	(Japan) Taki Inoue	Footwork-Hart	66	+2 laps	22	
10	25	(United Kingdom) Martin Brundle	Ligier-Mugen-Honda	61	Collision	14	
11	28	(Austria) Gerhard Berger	Ferrari	61	Collision	4	
Ret	23	(Italy) Pierluigi Martini	Minardi-Ford	60	Throttle	17	
Ret	22	(Brazil) Roberto Moreno	Forti-Ford	54	Fuel system	23	
Ret	5	(United Kingdom) Damon Hill	Williams-Renault	50	Gearbox	2	
Ret	7	(United Kingdom) Mark Blundell	McLaren-Mercedes	47	Engine	10	
Ret	3	(Japan) Ukyo Katayama	Tyrrell-Yamaha	42	Engine	16	
Ret	16	(France) Bertrand Gachot	Pacific-Ford	36	Battery	20	
Ret	30	(Germany) Heinz-Harald Frentzen	Sauber-Ford	26	Engine	12	
Ret	21	(Brazil) Pedro Diniz	Forti-Ford	26	Gearbox	24	
Ret	29	(France) Jean-Christophe Boullion	Sauber-Ford	19	Spun off	18	
Ret	17	(Italy) Andrea Montermini	Pacific-Ford	5	Gearbox	21	
Ret	6	(United Kingdom) David Coulthard	Williams-Renault	1	Spun off	3	
Ret	2	(United Kingdom) Johnny Herbert	Benetton-Renault	0	Collision	6	
Ret	8	(Finland) Mika Häkkinen	McLaren-Mercedes	0	Collision	7	

== Championship standings after the race ==
Drivers' Championship standings

Pos	Driver	Points
1	(Germany) Michael Schumacher	36
2	(United Kingdom) Damon Hill	29
3	(France) Jean Alesi	24
4	(Austria) Gerhard Berger	17
5	(United Kingdom) Johnny Herbert	12

Constructors' Championship standings

Pos	Constructor	Points
1	(Italy) Ferrari	41
2	(United Kingdom) Benetton-Renault	38
3	(United Kingdom) Williams-Renault	32
4	(Republic of Ireland) Jordan-Peugeot	12
5	(United Kingdom) McLaren-Mercedes	8

- Note: Only the top five positions are included for both sets of standings.

Previous race: 1995 Monaco Grand Prix	FIA Formula One World Championship; 1995 season	Next race: 1995 French Grand Prix
Previous race: 1994 Canadian Grand Prix	Canadian Grand Prix	Next race: 1996 Canadian Grand Prix
