= Larrousse LH93 =

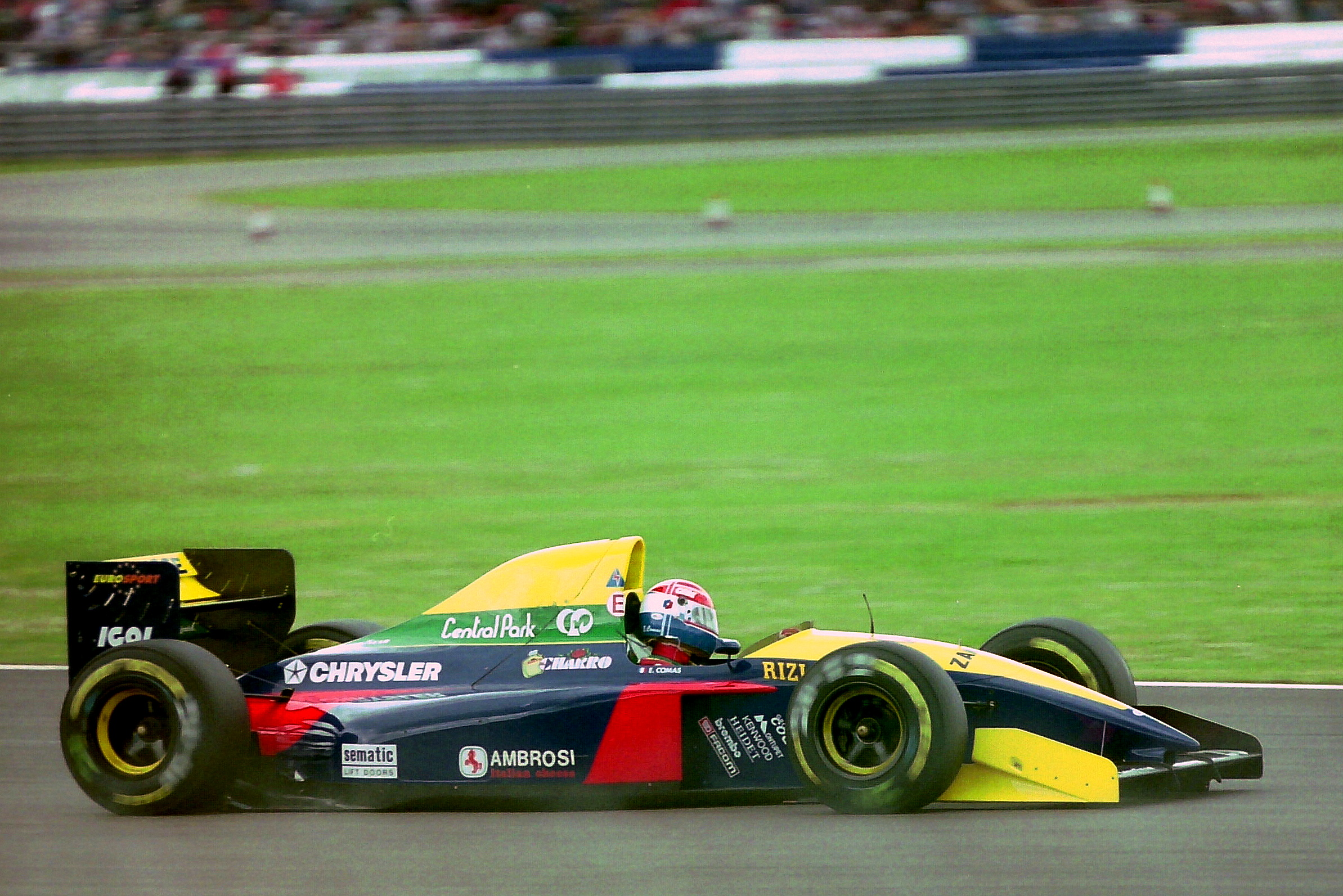
- Category: Formula One
- Constructor: Larrousse
- Designers: Robin Herd (Technical Director); Michel Têtu (Chief Designer); Tim Holloway (Chief Engineer); Tino Belli (Head of Aerodynamics); Mauro Forghieri (Chief Engine Designer (Lamborghini))
- Predecessor: LC92
- Successor: LH94

Technical specifications
- Chassis: Carbon fibre monocoque
- Suspension (front): Double wishbones, pushrod, twin Bilstein dampers
- Suspension (rear): Double wishbones, pullrod, twin Bilstein dampers
- Axle track: Front: 1,692 mm (66.6 in); Rear: 1,618 mm (63.7 in)
- Wheelbase: 2,940 mm (116 in)
- Engine: Lamborghini LE3512 3,493 cc (213.2 cu in) V12 NA mid-engine, longitudinally mounted
- Transmission: Larrousse / Lamborghini 6-speed semi-automatic
- Weight: 515 kg (1,135.4 lb)
- Fuel: Elf
- Tyres: Goodyear

Competition history
- Notable entrants: Larrouse F1
- Notable drivers: 19. (France) Philippe Alliot; 20. (France) Érik Comas; 20. (Japan) Toshio Suzuki
- Debut: 1993 South African Grand Prix
- Last event: 1993 Australian Grand Prix
Races	Wins	Poles	F/Laps
16	0	0	0
- Constructors' Championships: 0
- Drivers' Championships: 0

The Larrousse LH93 was the car with which the Larrousse team competed in the 1993 Formula One World Championship. The LH93 was Larrousse's first in-house chassis, following six seasons with Lola and Venturi chassis. Driven by Philippe Alliot, Érik Comas and Toshio Suzuki, the LH93 scored three points, giving the team tenth in the Constructors' Championship.

As of 2026, this is the last Formula One car to powered by a Lamborghini V12 engine.

== Development ==
Throughout the 1993 season, rumours spread of Peugeot's return to Formula One as an engine supplier. These rumours were later confirmed with Peugeot announcing their intention to build engines for the 1994 season. To get the attention of a lucrative factory engine, Larrousse had no choice but to build their own chassis. Larrousse's 1993 challenger borrowed heavily from the previous year's Venturi chassis. The wheelbase was shortened by 3.5 inches by moving the front wheels back, allowing for a larger front wing with midplates. The monocoque remained identical, while the sidepods were enlarged to aid in cooling the 3.5 litre Lamborghini V12. Brembo brakes were ditched in favour of French Carbone Industrie units. BP fuels were replaced by Elf fuels over the winter as well. Although the team was perpetually low on funds, Larrousse was able to complete a substantial amount of pre-season testing at Paul Ricard. Larrousse originally intended to have an active suspension pioneered by Williams, but rising costs and fears that it would be banned at the season's close meant the project was quickly abandoned.

== Racing record ==
The opening races of 1993 seemed promising for the fledgling Larrousse squad, even after suffering the embarrassment of a double-retirement in the opening round. Alliot and Comas brought both cars to the finish in Brazil, with Alliot narrowly missing out on points in 7th. The team had a miserable race in Donington's downpour. Alliot crashed on his own while Comas finished 4 laps down, ahead of only Michele Alboreto's Lola. Larrousse's efforts would finally pay off at Imola, with Alliot outlasting a sea of retirements to score a fine fifth and two crucial points. In Spain, Alliot and Comas drove nose to tail from lap one until Alliot's gearbox let go 26 laps in. Comas finished 9th after a race long battle with Mark Blundell, Christian Fittipaldi, and Aguri Suzuki. It was the first of what would become an 8-race streak in which one Larrousse failed to finish due to a mechanical failure. By this point, money had run out and not a single part was updated after Hockenheim. The team's second double-finish came 7 months after their first, with the luckless Comas surviving a crash-strewn Italian Grand Prix to take a point for sixth. Things looked to be on the upswing for the team, with only one retirement in the final four races. Sadly Larrousse's points tally leaving Monza would remain unchanged. Penniless, Gérard Larrousse hired the well-funded Toshio Suzuki to replace Alliot for Japan and Australia.

Approximately two thirds of the way through the season, Lamborghini's parent company Chrysler tested the V12 engine with the McLaren team. During 1993, the Lamborghini V12 was rated at approximately 700 bhp (522 kW; 710 PS), around 80 bhp (60 kW; 81 PS) less than the Renault V10's and around 40 bhp (30 kW; 41 PS) less than Ferrari's V12. Over the course of the McLaren tests, which included input and drives from triple World Champion Ayrton Senna, approximately 50 bhp (37 kW; 51 PS) was found in the Lamborghini 3512 giving it upwards of 750 bhp (559 kW; 760 PS), although the tests also proved that reliability was very suspect with that power increase. Despite the power gain, the test engines were never made available for Larrousse to use during the year.

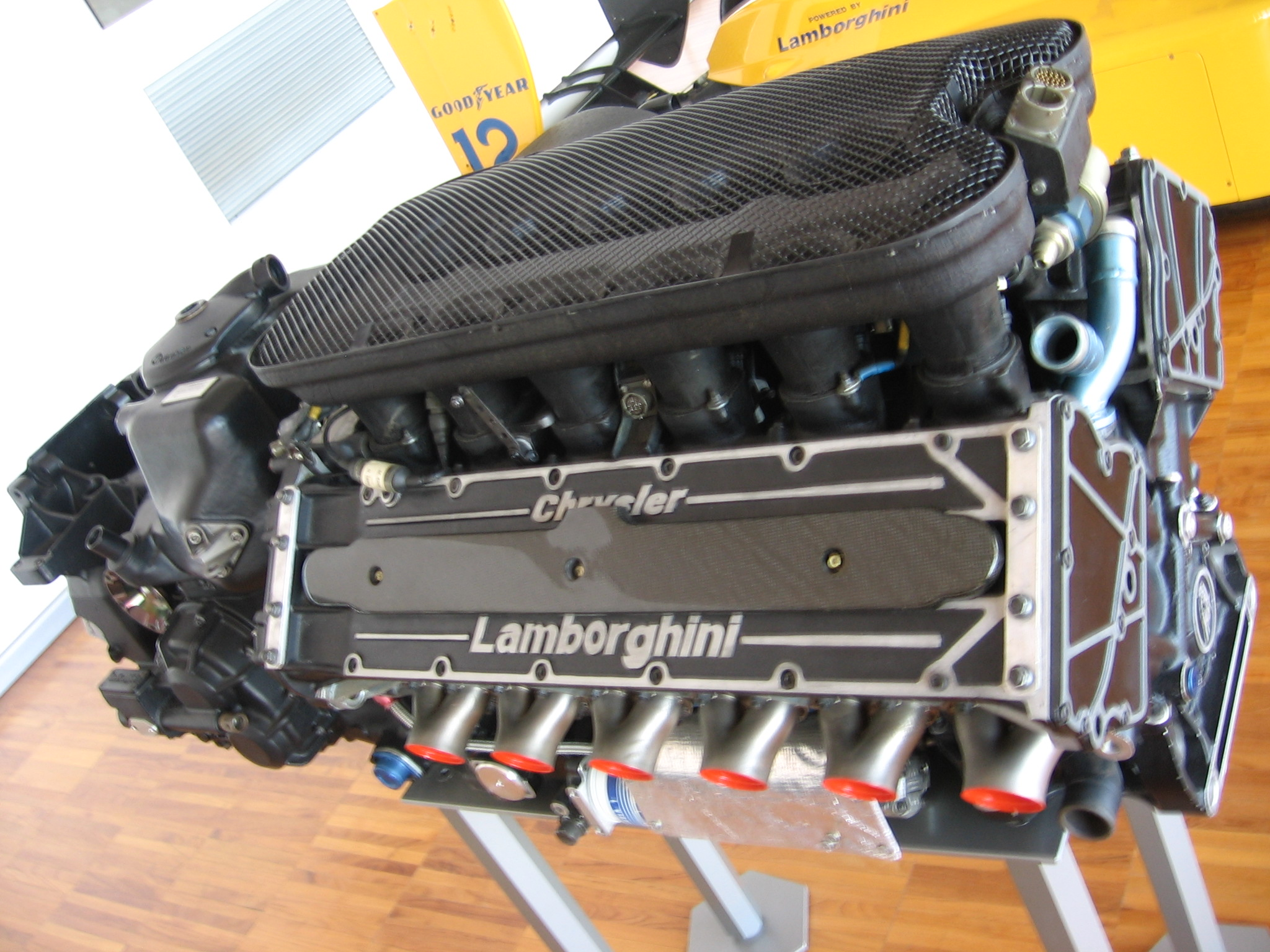
Lamborghini's V12 engine as used by the Larrousse team in 1993.

== Complete Formula One results ==
(key)

Year	Entrant	Engine(s)	Tyres	Drivers	1	2	3	4	5	6	7	8	9	10	11	12	13	14	15	16	Points	WCC
1993	Larrousse F1	Lamborghini V12	G		RSA	BRA	EUR	SMR	ESP	MON	CAN	FRA	GBR	GER	HUN	BEL	ITA	POR	JPN	AUS	3	10th
1993	Larrousse F1	Lamborghini V12	G	Philippe Alliot	Ret	7	Ret	5	Ret	12	Ret	9	11	12	8	12	9	10			3	10th
1993	Larrousse F1	Lamborghini V12	G	Toshio Suzuki															12	14	3	10th
1993	Larrousse F1	Lamborghini V12	G	Érik Comas	Ret	10	9	Ret	9	Ret	8	16	Ret	Ret	Ret	Ret	6	11	Ret	12	3	10th
