= 1993 Formula One World Championship =

47th season of FIA Formula One motor racing

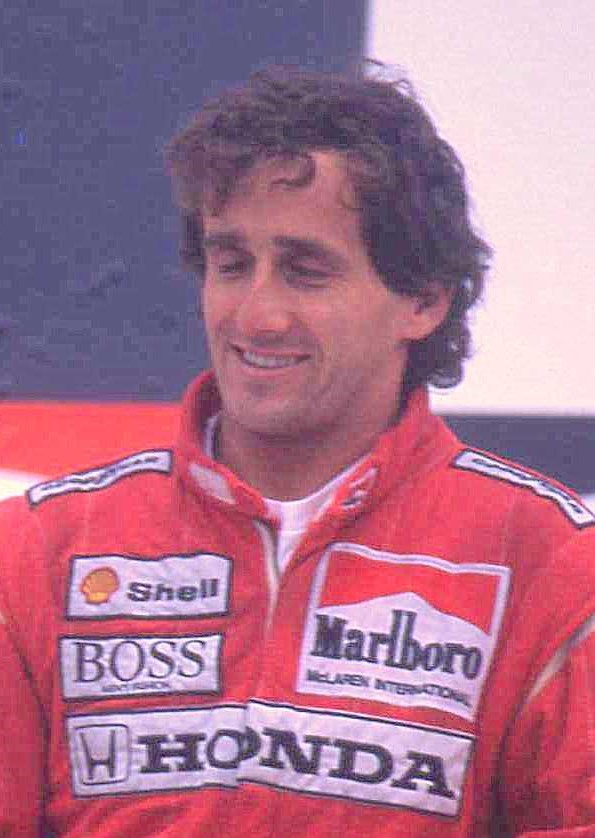
Alain Prost (pictured here driving for McLaren in 1989) won his fourth and final title with Williams in his last season of F1 racing.

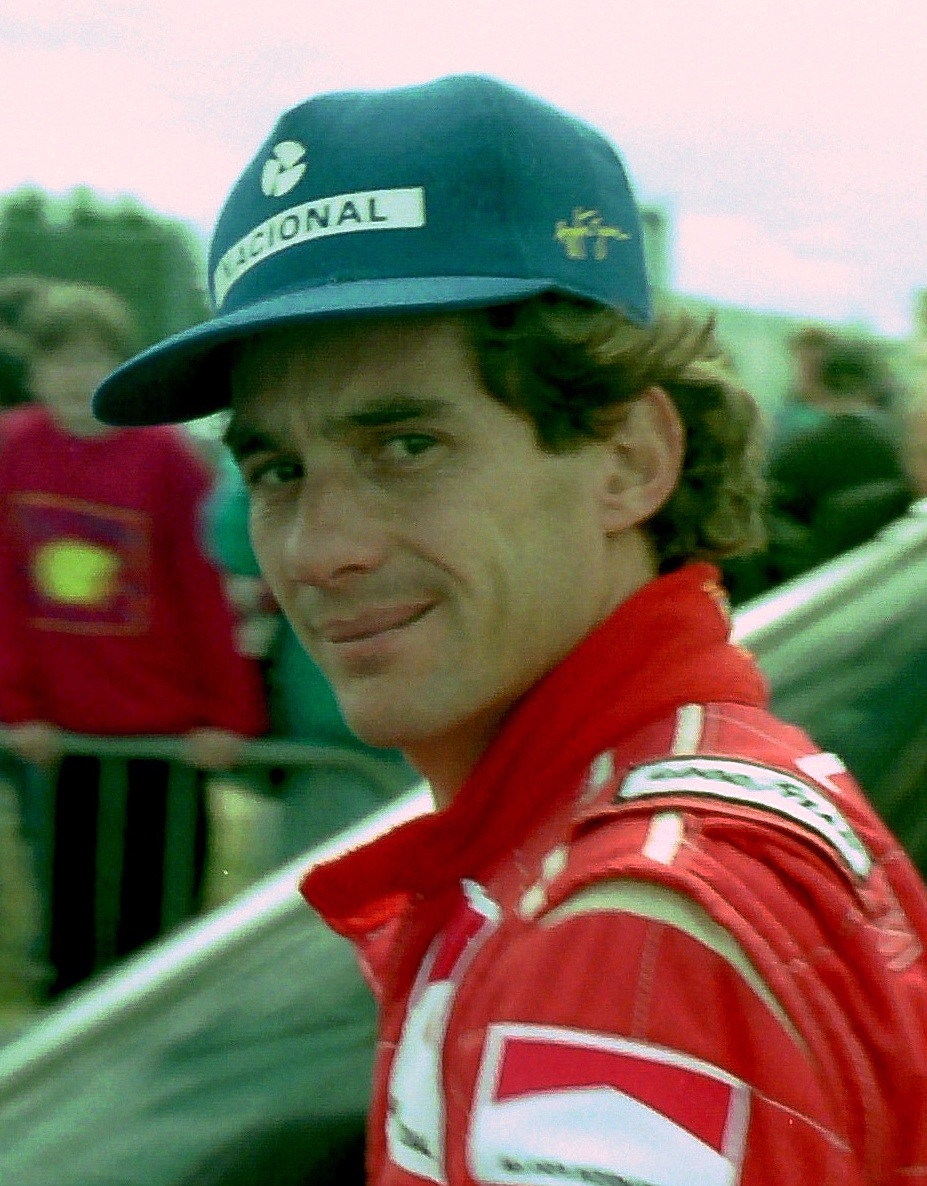
Three-time world champion Ayrton Senna finished runner-up in his final season at McLaren.

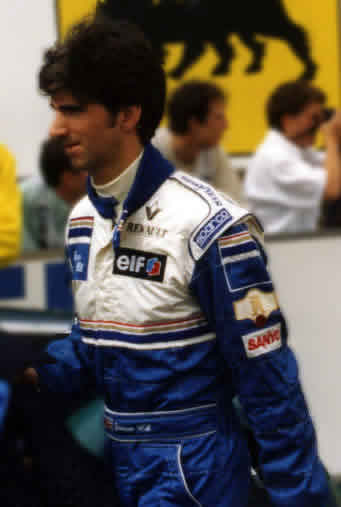
Prost's teammate Damon Hill (pictured in 1995) finished the season ranked third in his first year with Williams.

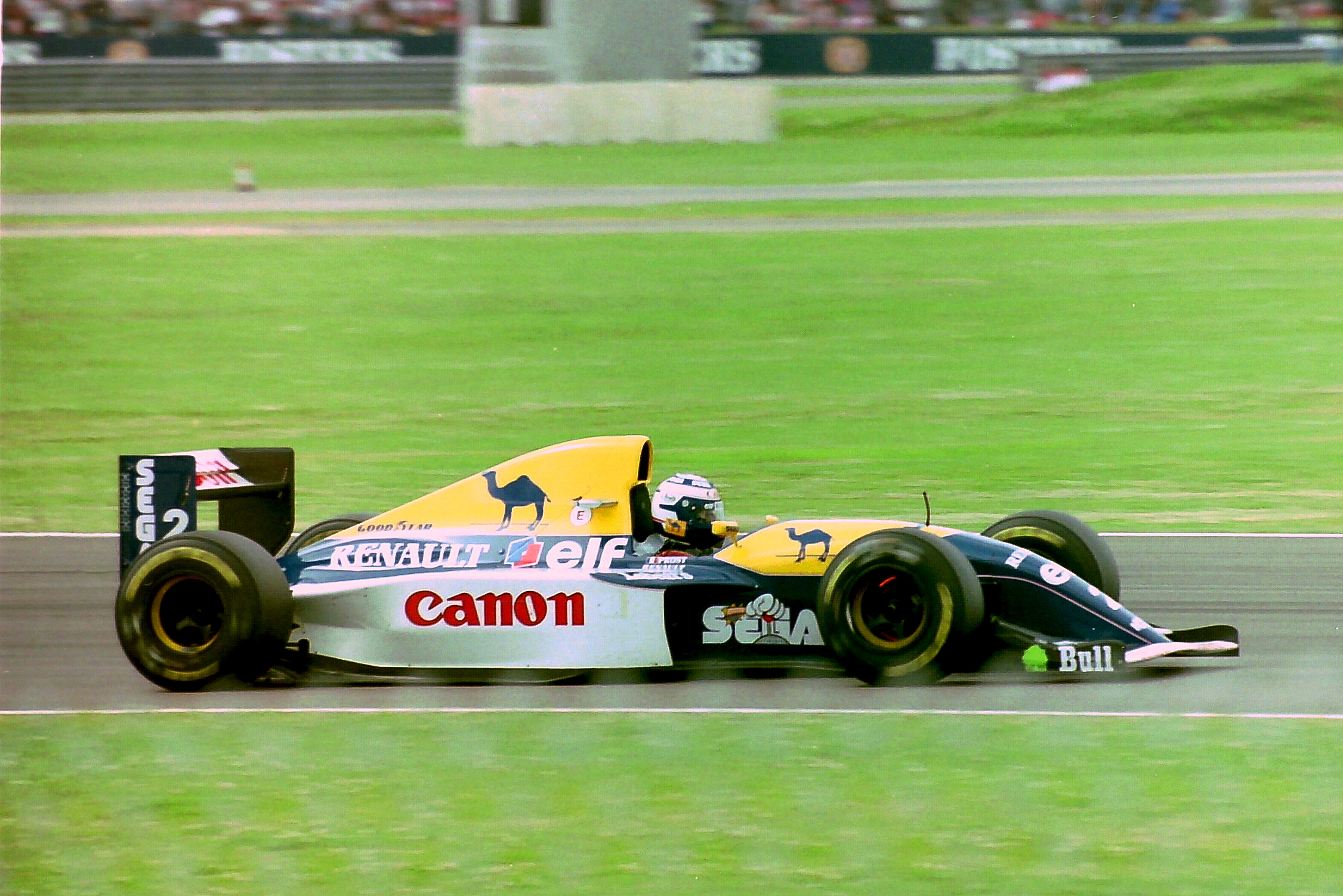
Williams-Renault won the Constructors' Championship title with the Williams FW15C.

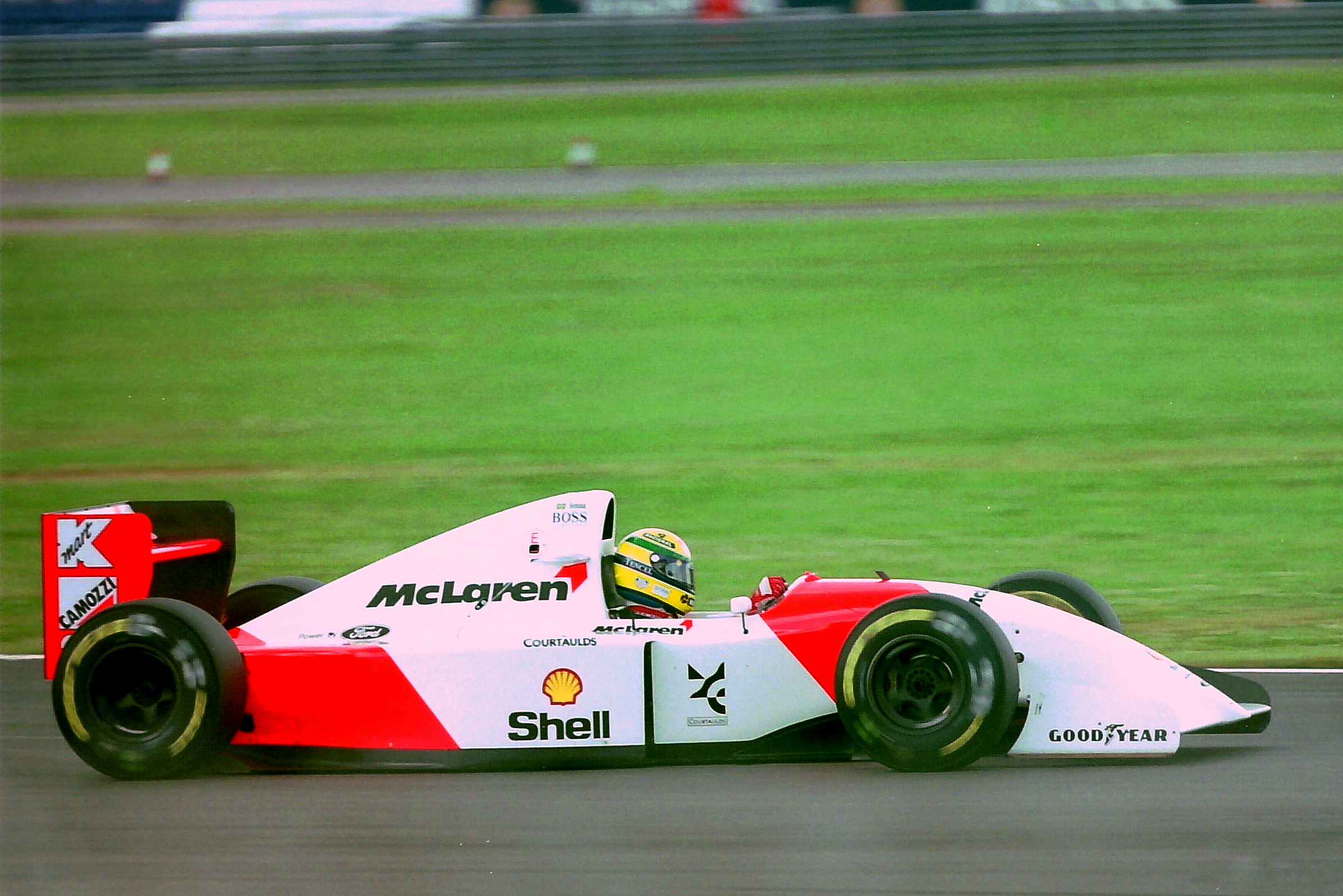
McLaren-Ford placed second with the McLaren MP4/8.

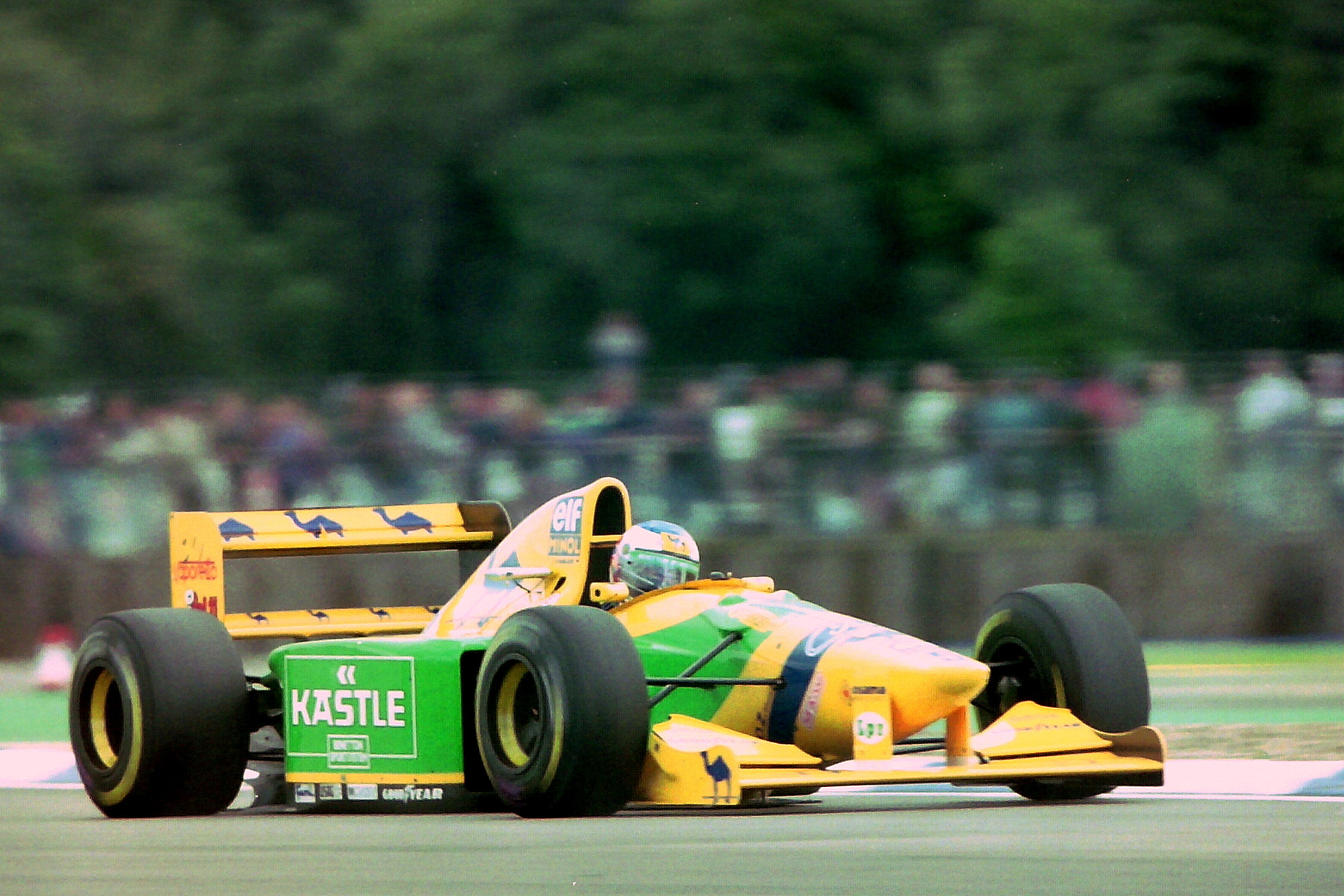
Benetton-Ford placed third with the Benetton B193.

The 1993 FIA Formula One World Championship was the 47th season of FIA Formula One motor racing. It featured the 1993 Formula One World Championship for Drivers and the 1993 Formula One World Championship for Constructors, which were contested concurrently over a sixteen-race series that commenced on 14 March and ended on 7 November. Alain Prost won his fourth and final Drivers' Championship. As of 2026, this is the last championship for a French Formula One driver.

Furthermore, Prost achieved his 50th F1 victory at the British Grand Prix, becoming the first driver to reach this milestone. His fierce rival, Ayrton Senna, finished runner-up in the championship after winning five races for McLaren-Ford; these included his home race in Brazil, the European Grand Prix in wet conditions, and, for the fifth year in succession and sixth time in all, the Monaco Grand Prix. Prost's Williams teammate, Damon Hill, took his first F1 victory in Hungary; two further victories gave him third in the championship.

At the end of the season, Prost retired from Grand Prix racing, bringing an end to an era in which he and Senna had largely dominated the sport. Senna would take Prost's place at Williams, only to lose his life three races into the 1994 season.

1993 was notable for being the crux of a period in Formula One known for massive advances in technology in a very short time. The Williams FW15C of that year, for example, featured hydraulically and electronically controlled active suspension, power steering, anti-lock brakes, fly-by-wire controls, traction control, a semi-automatic gearbox that could be switched over to fully-automatic, highly sophisticated onboard telemetry, pneumatic valve springs in the engine, and even a push-to-pass system that, at least in theory, made overtaking easier. Williams also tested a continuously variable transmission, while Benetton-Ford tested a four-wheel steering system late in the season. Nearly all cars in 1993 had an active suspension system, which kept the car's ride height consistent throughout a lap, making the aerodynamics of the car more efficient and effective. Many of these systems would be banned for 1994.

Williams-Renault won their second consecutive Constructor's Championship this year, the sixth in all for Williams. The season saw the first appearance of Sauber Motorsport in Formula One. As of 2025, the 1993 season marked the last season in which Formula One would hold a race on the African continent as the only African race on the 1993 schedule - the South African Grand Prix would not take place in 1994 or in susbsequent seasons. This season, and 1992 before it are the only seasons of Formula One racing to take place on all 6 human-inhabited continents.

== Drivers and constructors ==
The following teams and drivers competed in the 1993 FIA Formula One World Championship. All teams competed with tyres supplied by Goodyear.

Entrant	Constructor	Chassis	Engine	No	Driver	Rounds
(United Kingdom) Canon Williams Renault	Williams-Renault	FW15C	Renault RS5 3.5 V10	0 (Note: With the departure of reigning champion Nigel Mansell, car number 1 was not assigned; Damon Hill ran with number 0.)	(United Kingdom) Damon Hill	All
(United Kingdom) Canon Williams Renault	Williams-Renault	FW15C	Renault RS5 3.5 V10	2	(France) Alain Prost	All
(United Kingdom) Tyrrell	Tyrrell-Yamaha	020C; 021	Yamaha OX10A 3.5 V10	3	(Japan) Ukyo Katayama	All
(United Kingdom) Tyrrell	Tyrrell-Yamaha	020C; 021	Yamaha OX10A 3.5 V10	4	(Italy) Andrea de Cesaris	All
(United Kingdom) Camel Benetton Ford	Benetton-Ford	B193; B193B	Ford HBA7 3.5 V8; Ford HBA8 3.5 V8	5	(Germany) Michael Schumacher	All
(United Kingdom) Camel Benetton Ford	Benetton-Ford	B193; B193B	Ford HBA7 3.5 V8; Ford HBA8 3.5 V8	6	(Italy) Riccardo Patrese	All
(United Kingdom) Marlboro McLaren	McLaren-Ford	MP4/8	Ford HBE7 3.5 V8; Ford HBA8 3.5 V8	7	(United States) Michael Andretti	1–13
(United Kingdom) Marlboro McLaren	McLaren-Ford	MP4/8	Ford HBE7 3.5 V8; Ford HBA8 3.5 V8	7	(Finland) Mika Häkkinen	14–16
(United Kingdom) Marlboro McLaren	McLaren-Ford	MP4/8	Ford HBE7 3.5 V8; Ford HBA8 3.5 V8	8	(Brazil) Ayrton Senna	All
(United Kingdom) Footwork Mugen Honda	Footwork-Mugen-Honda	FA13B; FA14	Mugen-Honda MF-351HB 3.5 V10	9	(United Kingdom) Derek Warwick	All
(United Kingdom) Footwork Mugen Honda	Footwork-Mugen-Honda	FA13B; FA14	Mugen-Honda MF-351HB 3.5 V10	10	(Japan) Aguri Suzuki	All
(United Kingdom) Team Castrol Lotus	Lotus-Ford	107B	Ford HBD6 3.5 V8	11	(Italy) Alessandro Zanardi	1–12
(United Kingdom) Team Castrol Lotus	Lotus-Ford	107B	Ford HBD6 3.5 V8	11	(Portugal) Pedro Lamy	13–16
(United Kingdom) Team Castrol Lotus	Lotus-Ford	107B	Ford HBD6 3.5 V8	12	(United Kingdom) Johnny Herbert	All
(Republic of Ireland) Sasol Jordan	Jordan-Hart	193	Hart 1035 3.5 V10	14	(Brazil) Rubens Barrichello	All
(Republic of Ireland) Sasol Jordan	Jordan-Hart	193	Hart 1035 3.5 V10	15	(Italy) Ivan Capelli	1–2
(Republic of Ireland) Sasol Jordan	Jordan-Hart	193	Hart 1035 3.5 V10	15	(Belgium) Thierry Boutsen	3–12
(Republic of Ireland) Sasol Jordan	Jordan-Hart	193	Hart 1035 3.5 V10	15	(Italy) Marco Apicella	13
(Republic of Ireland) Sasol Jordan	Jordan-Hart	193	Hart 1035 3.5 V10	15	(Italy) Emanuele Naspetti	14
(Republic of Ireland) Sasol Jordan	Jordan-Hart	193	Hart 1035 3.5 V10	15	(United Kingdom) Eddie Irvine	15–16
(France) Larrousse F1	Larrousse-Lamborghini	LH93	Lamborghini LE3512 3.5 V12	19	(France) Philippe Alliot	1–14
(France) Larrousse F1	Larrousse-Lamborghini	LH93	Lamborghini LE3512 3.5 V12	19	(Japan) Toshio Suzuki	15–16
(France) Larrousse F1	Larrousse-Lamborghini	LH93	Lamborghini LE3512 3.5 V12	20	(France) Érik Comas	All
(Italy) Lola BMS Scuderia Italia	Lola-Ferrari	T93/30	Ferrari Tipo 038 3.5 V12	21	(Italy) Michele Alboreto	1–14
(Italy) Lola BMS Scuderia Italia	Lola-Ferrari	T93/30	Ferrari Tipo 038 3.5 V12	22	(Italy) Luca Badoer	1–14
(Italy) Minardi Team	Minardi-Ford	M193	Ford HBD6 3.5 V8	23	(Brazil) Christian Fittipaldi	1–14
(Italy) Minardi Team	Minardi-Ford	M193	Ford HBD6 3.5 V8	23	(France) Jean-Marc Gounon	15–16
(Italy) Minardi Team	Minardi-Ford	M193	Ford HBD6 3.5 V8	24	(Italy) Fabrizio Barbazza	1–8
(Italy) Minardi Team	Minardi-Ford	M193	Ford HBD6 3.5 V8	24	(Italy) Pierluigi Martini	9–16
(France) Ligier Gitanes Blondes	Ligier-Renault	JS39	Renault RS5 3.5 V10	25	(United Kingdom) Martin Brundle	All
(France) Ligier Gitanes Blondes	Ligier-Renault	JS39	Renault RS5 3.5 V10	26	(United Kingdom) Mark Blundell	All
(Italy) Scuderia Ferrari	Ferrari	F93A	Ferrari Tipo 041 3.5 V12	27	(France) Jean Alesi	All
(Italy) Scuderia Ferrari	Ferrari	F93A	Ferrari Tipo 041 3.5 V12	28	(Austria) Gerhard Berger	All
(Switzerland) Team Sauber Formula 1	Sauber	C12	Ilmor 2175A 3.5 V10; Ilmor 2175B 3.5 V10	29	(Austria) Karl Wendlinger	All
(Switzerland) Team Sauber Formula 1	Sauber	C12	Ilmor 2175A 3.5 V10; Ilmor 2175B 3.5 V10	30	(Finland) JJ Lehto	All

=== Team changes ===
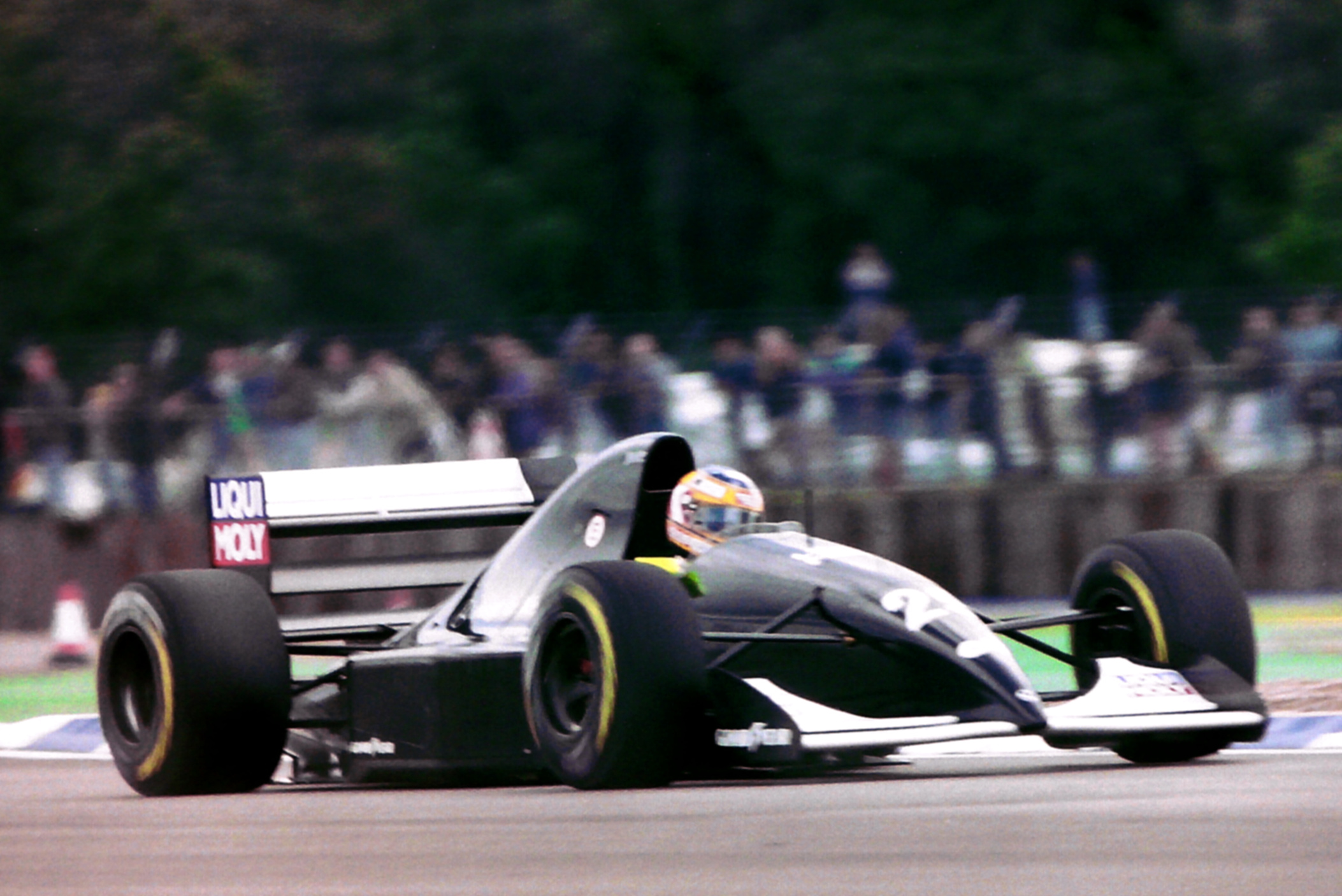
Sauber entered F1 in 1993 with backing of Mercedes-Benz

The worldwide early 1990s recession had taken its toll: the Brabham, Andrea Moda and Fondmetal teams had failed to complete the 1992 season, while March formally withdrew at the beginning of 1993. Thus, there were only 13 teams on the grid at the opening race of 1993, in South Africa.

The Swiss Sauber team were the only new entry to the grid in 1993, with much-publicised backing from German car manufacturer Mercedes-Benz, who were funding the team's engine supplier, Ilmor. Under the instruction of Mercedes, the engines were badged as "Saubers" for their debut season and "Concept by Mercedes-Benz" decals were placed on the car's engine cover.

Jordan switched from using Yamaha V12 engines to the new Hart V10. Well known British Formula One engine maker and tuner Hart Racing Engines were making their full time Grand Prix return in 1993 after last being in Formula One in early 1986 with their 4 cylinder 415T turbo engine. Between 1990 and 1992, Brian Hart's company had been involved in doing freelance tuning work for some Formula One teams using the old Cosworth DFR V8 engine including Arrows, Tyrrell, Larrousse and AGS, but returned in 1993 with their own engine.

Numerous car number changes had taken place:

- Williams used the numbers 0 and 2 (see Driver changes).
- Benetton took the numbers 5 and 6, which Williams had used since 1984.
- McLaren took the numbers 7 and 8, vacated by Brabham, rather than trading with Williams as was customary until the previous season. The team had previously used the same numbers in 1978–1984.
- Jordan took the numbers 14 and 15, vacated by Fondmetal.
- Larrousse took the numbers 19 and 20, which Benetton and its predecessor Toleman had used since 1984.
- New team Sauber took the numbers 29 and 30, which Larrousse had used since 1987. These were now the highest numbers.
- The numbers 16 and 17, vacated by March, remained vacant until 1995.

=== Driver changes ===
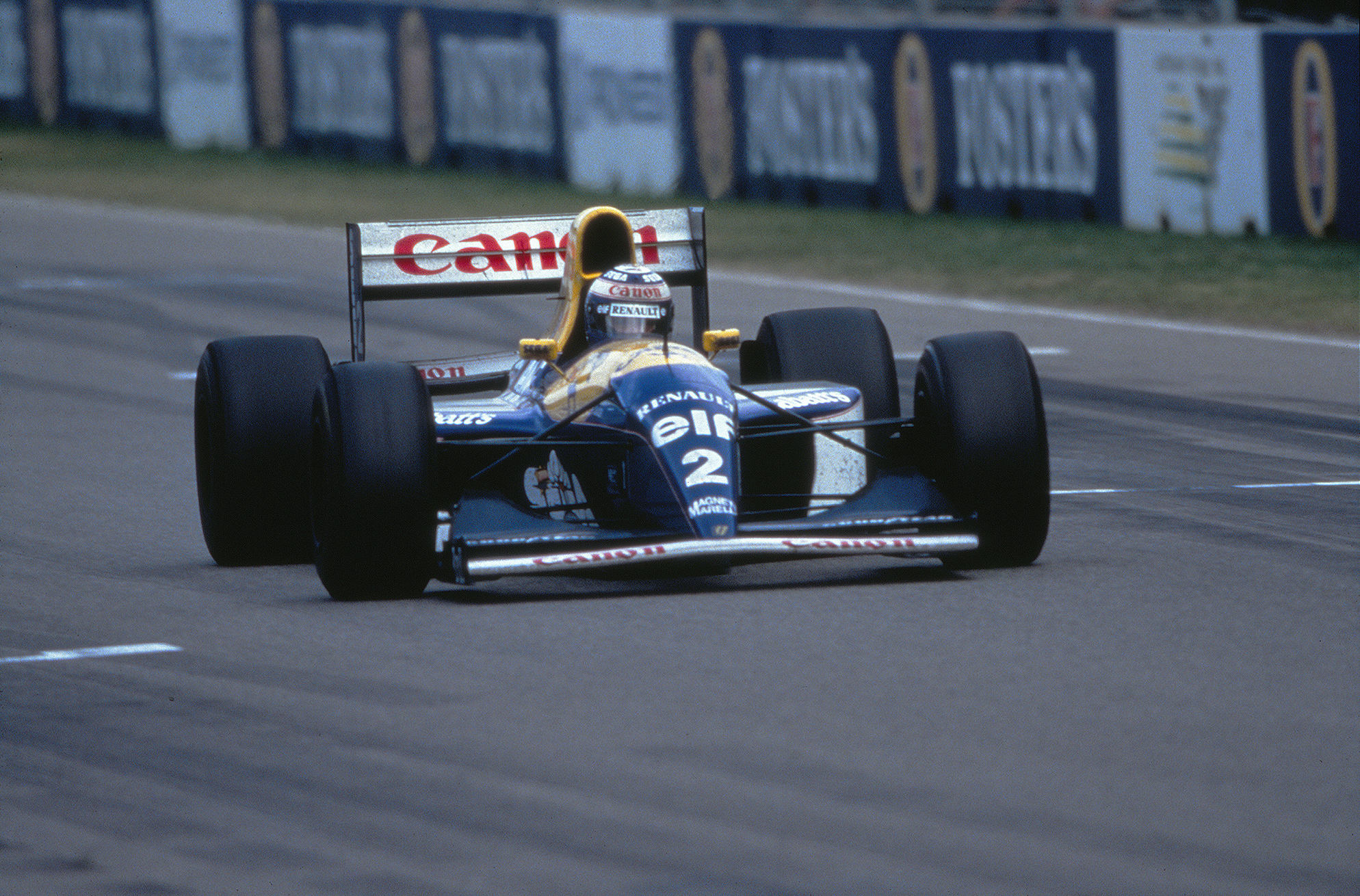
Alain Prost returned to F1 with Williams

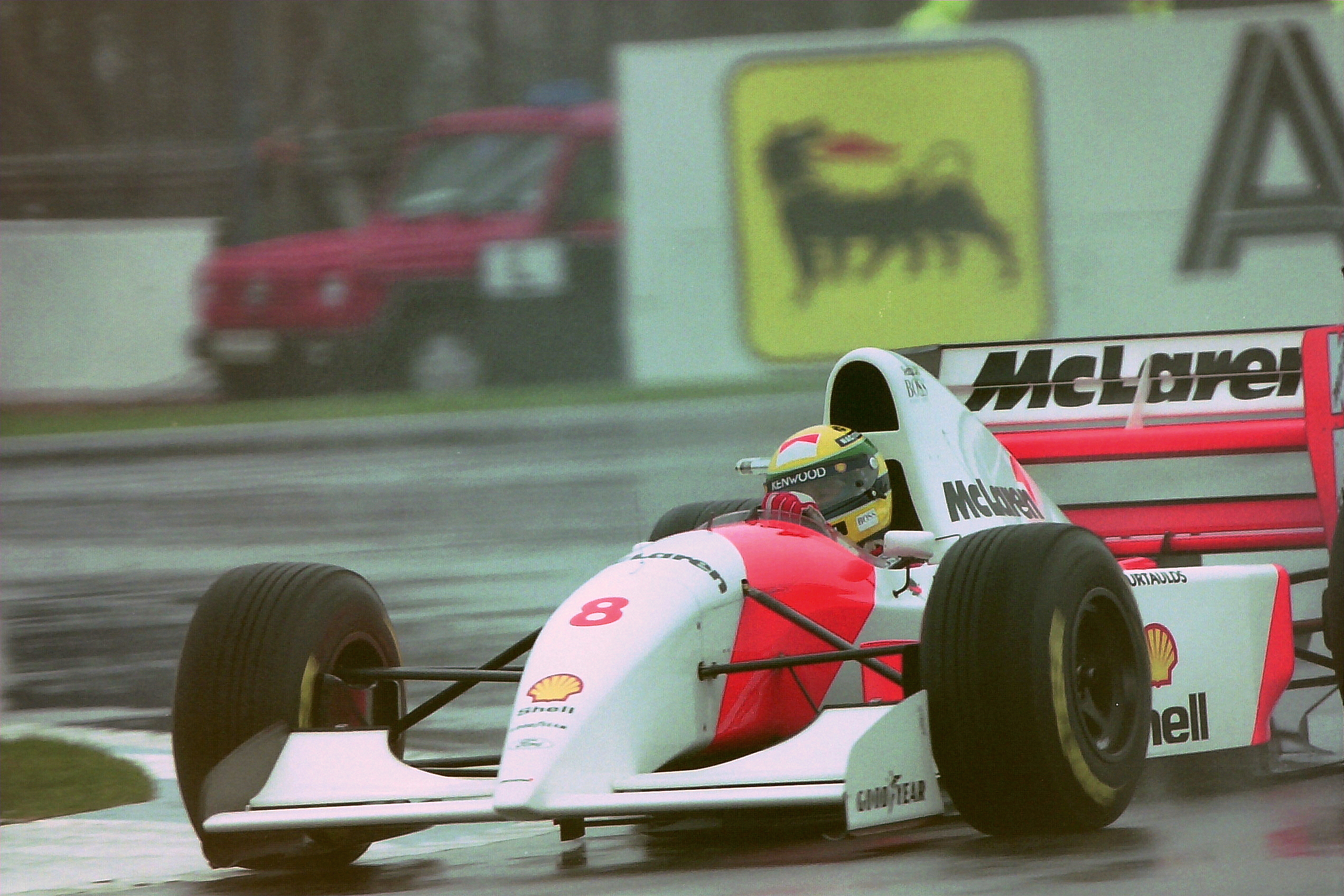
After a long consideration, Ayrton Senna re-signed with McLaren

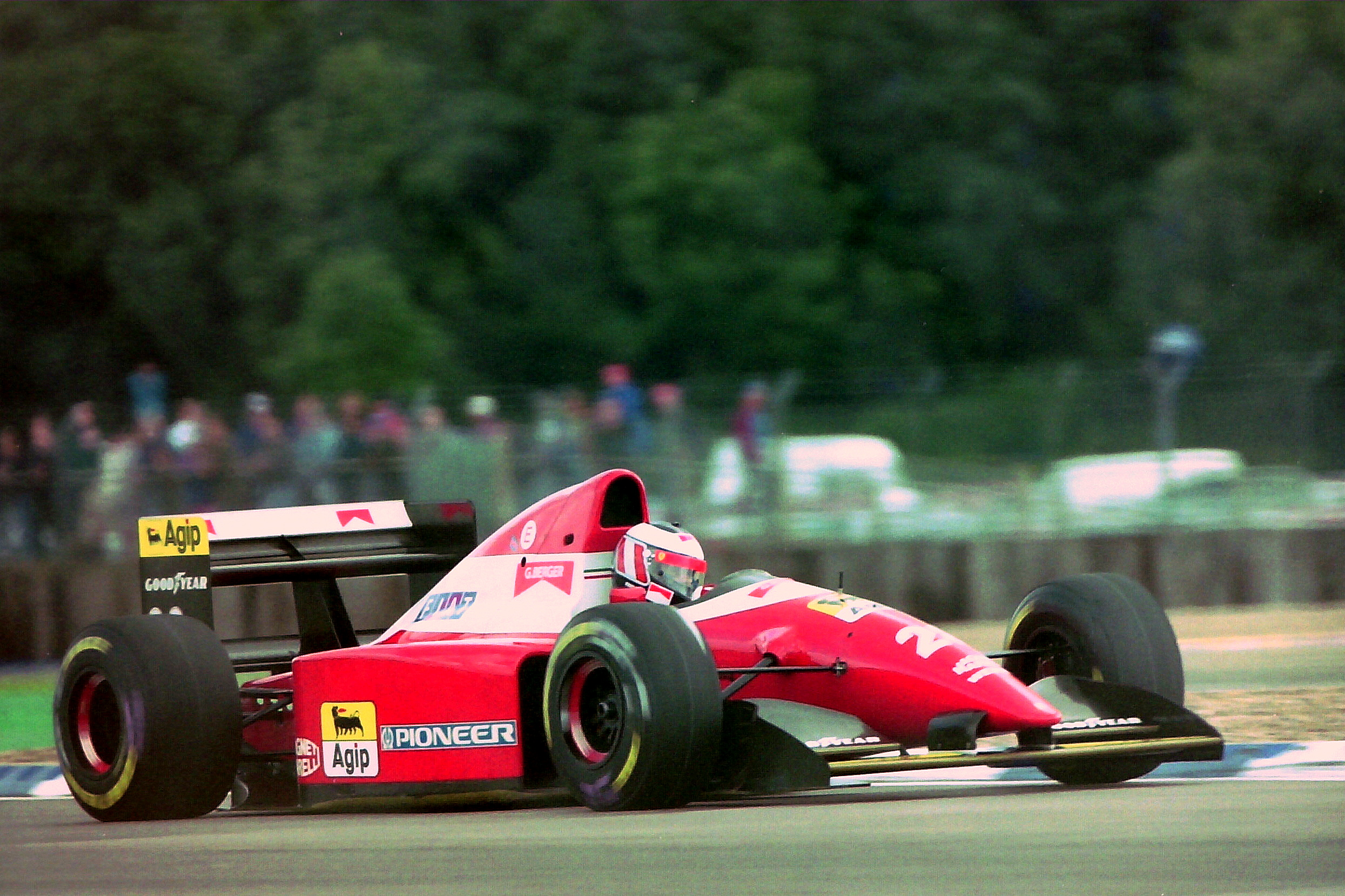
Gerhard Berger returned to Ferrari after three years at McLaren

1993 saw a major shake-up of drivers, especially among the top teams. Across the grid, a number of experienced drivers retired or moved to other series, and new faces emerged.

- Williams completed the signing of Alain Prost, who was returning to the sport after a year out in 1992. Although Nigel Mansell was the reigning World Champion, team owner Frank Williams would not guarantee him the number 1 driver status in the team next to the triple World Champion Prost, so he opted not to remain with the team to defend his title and moved to IndyCar racing in the US with Newman-Haas Racing to replace Michael Andretti who went to F1 with McLaren. Prost's teammate would be Damon Hill, son of Graham Hill and Williams's test driver in 1992. The absence of the defending champion meant that Williams could not use the number 1 on their cars, so the number 0 was used instead, by Hill, while Prost used the number 2. Hill only had 2 Grand Prix starts (and 6 failures to qualify) for Brabham in 1992 when signed by Williams for 1993.
- Uncertainty surrounded the McLaren team, whose driver Ayrton Senna was reluctant to re-sign for 1993, as Honda had withdrawn from the sport and the team were not expected to be competitive with customer Ford engines. McLaren signed Michael Andretti, a successful IndyCar driver and son of 1978 World Champion Mario Andretti, and Mika Häkkinen, who had impressed for Team Lotus in 1991 and 1992. Senna eventually signed on a race-by-race basis before signing for the full season, moving Häkkinen into a test driver role.
- Benetton retained Michael Schumacher, but lost Martin Brundle, who was replaced after numerous run-ins and disagreements with team manager Flavio Briatore. Taking the second seat at Benetton was the most experienced driver in Formula One, Italian veteran Riccardo Patrese, who was released by Williams after just over five seasons with the team, despite having finished runner-up to Mansell in the championship of 1992.
- Ferrari retained Jean Alesi, but Ivan Capelli and Nicola Larini had both disappointed in 1992 and so Gerhard Berger returned to the team after three years at McLaren. Larini returned to his previous role as test driver for the team.
- Lotus retained Johnny Herbert and took on Alessandro Zanardi, who replaced Häkkinen.
- Tyrrell retained Andrea de Cesaris and took on Japan's Ukyo Katayama, who moved from Larrousse.
- Ligier reunited British drivers Martin Brundle and Mark Blundell: the two had previously driven for Brabham in 1991. This was the first and only time in Ligier's history that they did not have a French driver in their line-up.
- Footwork Arrows took on British veteran Derek Warwick, returning to the sport after two years away driving sports cars (Jaguar in 1991 and Peugeot in 1992). Warwick had previously raced for Arrows in 1987–1989. Japanese driver Aguri Suzuki was retained as number two driver.
- The BMS Scuderia Italia team switched from Dallara to Lola chassis and took on Michele Alboreto, a five-time race winner, with his last win eight years ago, and newcomer, Italian Luca Badoer, the 1992 International Formula 3000 champion.
- Jordan took on young debutant Brazilian Rubens Barrichello and ex-Ferrari driver Ivan Capelli.
- Larrousse signed Philippe Alliot, returning to the team after driving for Larrousse in 1987–1989, and Érik Comas, who moved from Ligier.
- Minardi retained Christian Fittipaldi and took on Fabrizio Barbazza.
- As their first pair of drivers, Sauber attracted Finland's JJ Lehto, who moved from BMS Scuderia Italia, and Austria's Karl Wendlinger, who had impressed with March in 1992. Wendlinger was also part of Sauber-Mercedes sportscar programme, prior to joining Formula One.

In all, only seven drivers who lined up on the grid in South Africa were with the same team they had been with the previous year: Ayrton Senna, Michael Schumacher, Jean Alesi, Johnny Herbert, Andrea de Cesaris, Aguri Suzuki and Christian Fittipaldi.

As of 2026, the off-season is the most recent where no team retained their entire line-up from previous year.

==== Mid-season changes ====
- McLaren: after the Italian Grand Prix, Mika Häkkinen stepped up from his position as test driver to take the place of Michael Andretti.
- Lotus: when Alessandro Zanardi had a huge crash in the Belgian Grand Prix, he was replaced by Portuguese debutant Pedro Lamy.
- Jordan Grand Prix: after Ivan Capelli drove two races, four other drivers took his seat during the rest of the season: Thierry Boutsen (10 races), Marco Apicella (1), test driver Emanuele Naspetti (1) and finally Eddie Irvine (2).
- Larrousse: Toshio Suzuki replaced Philippe Alliot for the final two races.
- Minardi: at the half point in the season, Fabrizio Barbazza was replaced by Pierluigi Martini, returning for his third stint with the team. Christian Fittipaldi was replaced by Jean-Marc Gounon for the final two races of the season.

== Calendar ==
Round	Grand Prix	Circuit	Date
1	South African Grand Prix	(South Africa) Kyalami Grand Prix Circuit, Midrand	14 March
2	Brazilian Grand Prix	(Brazil) Autódromo José Carlos Pace, São Paulo	28 March
3	European Grand Prix	(United Kingdom) Donington Park, Castle Donington	11 April
4	San Marino Grand Prix	(Italy) Autodromo Internazionale Enzo e Dino Ferrari, Imola	25 April
5	Spanish Grand Prix	(Spain) Circuit de Barcelona-Catalunya, Montmeló	9 May
6	Monaco Grand Prix	Circuit de Monaco, Monte Carlo	23 May
7	Canadian Grand Prix	(Canada) Circuit Gilles Villeneuve, Montréal	13 June
8	French Grand Prix	(France) Circuit de Nevers Magny-Cours, Magny-Cours	4 July
9	British Grand Prix	(United Kingdom) Silverstone Circuit, Silverstone	11 July
10	German Grand Prix	(Germany) Hockenheimring, Hockenheim	25 July
11	Hungarian Grand Prix	(Hungary) Hungaroring, Mogyoród	15 August
12	Belgian Grand Prix	(Belgium) Circuit de Spa-Francorchamps, Stavelot	29 August
13	Italian Grand Prix	(Italy) Autodromo Nazionale di Monza, Monza	12 September
14	Portuguese Grand Prix	(Portugal) Autódromo do Estoril, Estoril	26 September
15	Japanese Grand Prix	(Japan) Suzuka International Racing Course, Suzuka	24 October
16	Australian Grand Prix	(Australia) Adelaide Street Circuit, Adelaide	7 November

=== Calendar changes ===
- The Mexican Grand Prix left the calendar after seven years, due to safety concerns surrounding the very bumpy surface of the Autódromo Hermanos Rodríguez. (It would return in 2015).
- The Asian Grand Prix was scheduled to be raced on 4 April, at the Autopolis circuit in Japan. However, the plans failed to materialise and the race was cancelled. (A second Japanese race appeared on the following season's calendar at TI Circuit Aida under the Pacific Grand Prix banner.)
- The 1993 season saw the return of the European Grand Prix to the calendar eight years after it was last held at Brands Hatch in 1985. The 1993 race was held at Donington Park, hosting its first top level racing car Grand Prix of any type since the old Donington Grand Prix in 1938. The European Grand Prix was held in place of the cancelled Asian Grand Prix, meaning the European leg of the season started two weeks earlier than originally planned. The dropping of the Mexican Grand Prix allowed the continuation of the familiar 16 race calendar that had been in place since 1984. As of 2026, it is the only time Donington Park has held a World Championship Formula One Grand Prix.
- The San Marino Grand Prix and Spanish Grand Prix swapped places on the calendar, so that the Spanish round was second in the usual European leg (not counting the stand-in race at Donington).

== Regulation changes ==
=== Technical regulations ===
Various changes were implemented to the cars in order to reduce cornering speeds:

- A reduction of the cars' track from 2,150 mm (7 ft 1 in) to 2,000 mm (6 ft 7 in)
- A reduction in tyre width: the rears going from 18 in (457 mm) to 15 in (381 mm), and the fronts going from 13 in (330 mm) to 11 in (279 mm).
- The maximum height of the rear wing was reduced from 100 cm (39 in) to 95 cm (37 in), measured from the ground.
- The maximum overhang of the front wing was reduced from 100 cm (39 in) to 90 cm (35 in).

Also, the surface area of the driver's headrest was increased from 80 cm^{2} (12 sq in) to 400 cm^{2} (62 sq in).

=== Sporting and event regulations ===
The pit lane speed limit was lowered to 50 km/h (31 mph) in practice sessions.

Severe crowd control measures were imposed to stop spectators entering the track at the end of the race, and most certainly before that.

==== Mid-season changes ====
After the first race of the season, two changes were made to the qualifying system:

- Each driver was limited to 12 laps in both qualifying sessions. This lasted until the end of the 2002 season.
- Originally, the number of cars allowed to start for the race was reduced from 26 to 24. But to ensure that every team could qualify at least one car, the teams unanimously agreed to raise this number to 25. This meant that every time, there was one driver not allowed to start. However, prior to the German Grand Prix, seeing that that one car was almost always a Scuderia Italia, the teams unanimously agreed to allow all 26 cars to qualify again.

== Race-by-race ==
=== Round 1: South Africa ===
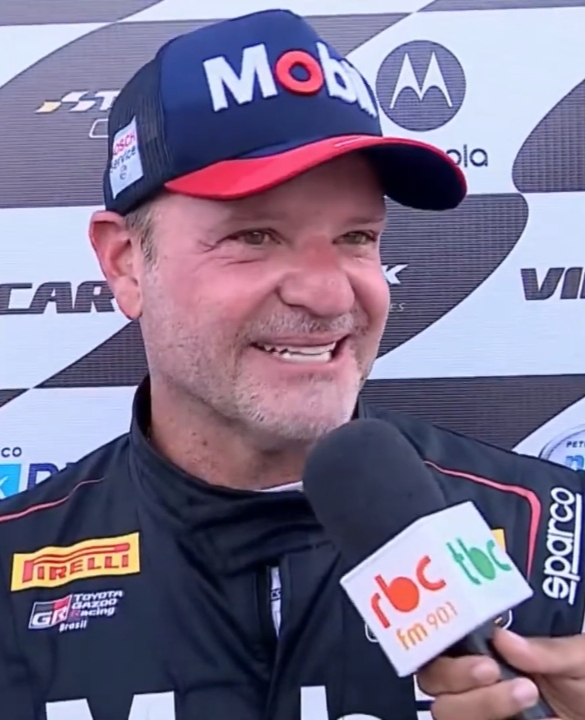
Rubens Barrichello (pictured in 2022) made his debut at Jordan.

The season began in Kyalami, where Prost took pole position ahead of Senna in second. Prost had a poor start and with Senna and Hill overtaking him. Hill spun in front of Prost and lost position, while Prost let Schumacher through into second position. Senna led ahead of Schumacher by the end of the first lap.

Prost overtook Schumacher for second place on lap 13. On lap 18 Prost attempted to overtake Senna, but Senna took the defensive inside line. However, on lap 25 Prost overtook Senna for the lead, whilst Schumacher passed Senna for second position. Shortly after Senna and Schumacher pitted with Senna rejoining ahead.

Schumacher attempted to overtake Senna on lap 40 but came into contact with Senna's car and spun, retiring him from the race. Patrese was holding third position when he spun on lap 47 as Fittipaldi passed Lehto. Prost won the race with Senna in second position, Blundell in third, Fittipaldi in fourth and Lehto in fifth.

This was the final South African Grand Prix to date.

=== Round 2: Brazil ===
Brazilian qualifying ended with a Williams front row, with Prost on pole and Hill in second. Senna qualified in third, with Schumacher in fourth and Andretti in fifth. Senna got ahead of Hill at the beginning of the race as behind him Andretti collided with Berger after being challenged by Wendlinger. Andretti then hit the barriers launching him directly over Berger's car, both drivers were uninjured. This meant that they both retired from the race, as did Brundle and Barbazza.

On lap 4 Patrese retired due to suspension failure. Whilst Prost extended his lead, Senna was under pressure from Hill who overtook him for second place on lap 11. On lap 25 Senna was given a stop-go penalty after overtaking a backmarker under yellow flags, which meant he re-entered the race behind Schumacher. Heavy rain then caused many drivers to spin with Fittipaldi and Prost retiring. Fittipaldi spun on lap 30 and as he was returning to the track Prost crashed into him. After the accident the safety car was brought out with Hill leading the race.

As the track began to dry out drivers stopped for dry tyres and during Schumacher's pit-stop his car fell off its jack. Schumacher rejoined the race behind Senna with Herbert and Blundell gaining pace. Shortly after Senna overtook Hill for first position and quickly began to pull away. Behind him Schumacher and Alesi were given stop-go penalties for overtaking under a yellow flag. Schumacher re-entered the race in fifth position and Alesi in ninth. Schumacher quickly overtook Blundell and Herbert to finish third. Senna won his first race of the season, taking the lead of the championship from Prost, with Hill in second position, followed by Schumacher, Herbert, Blundell and Alessandro Zanardi. Zanardi's 6th place would be his only points finish in Formula One.

=== Round 3: Europe ===
After a deal to host a race at the newly constructed Autopolis circuit in Japan fell through, it was replaced with the European Grand Prix, which was held at the historic Donington Park in Leicestershire, United Kingdom, this being the first time this circuit had hosted Grand Prix cars since the late 1930s. Williams qualified 1–2 for the second race in a row, Prost once again taking pole position. Schumacher took third, Senna fourth and Wendlinger in fifth. The race began in damp conditions with Schumacher blocking Senna meaning that they both lost time to Wendlinger, who took third. During the following lap Senna overtook four cars in quick succession to lead the race. Senna took Schumacher in the third corner, Wendlinger at Craner Curves, Hill at Coppice Corner and then Prost at the Melbourne Hairpin.

Behind Senna, Schumacher passed Wendlinger quickly, but when Andretti tried to overtake Wendlinger he crashed straight into him, meaning that they both retired from the race. This accident meant that Andretti had retired from his third consecutive race due to collision damage. As the track began to dry the drivers pitted for dry tyres. Lehto retired from fifth position on lap 14 because of handling problems. Berger moved up to fifth but also retired on lap 22 due to suspension problems. As it started to rain again drivers pitted for wet tyres. Schumacher decided to stay out, but crashed out from the lead due to that decision. As the track began to dry again drivers pitted once again, with Senna suffering problems meaning that the lost twenty seconds in the pit-stop, in which time Prost retook the lead.

As the rain began to fall yet again the Williams pitted for wet tyres, with Senna staying out on dry tyres. Senna's decision proved correct as the track began to dry quickly. Prost suffered a problem in the pits when the Williams pitted for dry tyres. This pushed him down into fourth position, a full lap behind Senna. As it began to rain for the fourth time, Barrichello pitted, losing his second-place position to Hill. Barrichello quickly retired due to fuel pressure problems. Senna won the race (by over one minute) with Hill in second and Prost in third.

=== Round 4: San Marino ===
In San Marino Williams occupied the first two positions on the grid, with Prost taking his fourth consecutive pole position. Schumacher qualified third, Senna in fourth and Wendlinger in fifth. As the race began Prost was overtaken by Hill and Senna, Senna easily getting past Schumacher. By the end of the first lap Hill was leading, followed by Senna, Prost, Schumacher and Wendlinger.

Hill pulled away whilst Prost was stuck behind Senna. Prost overtook Senna on lap 8 and set off in pursuit of Hill. Soon it was time for pit stops with Senna passing Prost. On lap 17 Prost overtook both Hill and Senna whilst battling backmarkers. Senna also got ahead of Hill. Soon after, on lap 21, Hill retired with brake failure. As the race progressed both McLaren cars retired from the race with Andretti spinning out from fifth position on lap 33 and ten laps later Senna retired with a hydraulic failure. Alesi, who managed to take Andretti's fifth position soon spun off because of a clutch failure.

Schumacher had made it up to second position with Wendlinger close behind; however, Wendlinger retired on lap 49 with engine failure. Prost won the race with Schumacher in second, Brundle in third, Lehto in fourth and Alliot in fifth.

=== Round 5: Spain ===
In Spain Prost once again out-qualified Hill who was in second position on the grid. In third was Senna, fourth was Schumacher and Patrese took fifth position. Hill had an exceptionally good start to the race, overtaking his pole position teammate. By the end of the first lap Hill was comfortably in the lead followed by Prost, Senna, Schumacher and Patrese.

Hill and Prost had built up a large lead by lap 11 and continued to move ahead through the field during the pit stops. Hill even managed to extend his lead over Prost, whilst Schumacher was beginning to challenge Senna. Schumacher attempted an overtaking manoeuvre on Senna, but instead left the track, going over a sand trap. He lost fifteen seconds, but crucially not his race position. As Hill began to close in on Prost, after losing position, Prost's Williams began to handle oddly and on lap 41 Hill retired from the race due to engine failure.

The following lap Wendlinger retired from the race due to problems with his fuel system. Prost took his third victory of the season, followed by Senna, Schumacher, Patrese and Andretti.

=== Round 6: Monaco ===
At the Monaco Grand Prix Prost took pole once again, but his teammate, Hill, only managed to qualify in fourth position, failing to out-qualify Schumacher in second and Senna in third. Blundell was forced off the track at Sainte Devote with suspension damage in the second Ligier before he eventually crashed out by lap 4 as the first retirement. By the end of the first lap there was no change in position at the front of the grid with Prost leading, Schumacher in second, Senna third, Hill fourth and Alesi fifth.

Shortly after Prost was penalised for jumping the start and was issued with a stop-go penalty by the stewards. He entered the pits on lap 12 and then stalled his car when he exited the pits. By the time he was out of the pits again he was in seventeenth position and a lap down. Schumacher was now comfortably in the lead and pulling away as Alesi allowed his teammate Berger to pass him. By lap 33 Schumacher had slowed down considerably and then retired from the race with a hydraulics problem in a cloud of smoke. Behind him however Prost was easily making his way back through the field.

As cars started pitting there was no change in order of the race leaders. However Prost had now managed to get himself into seventh position. He gained another place shortly after as Patrese retired on lap 54 with an engine failure. Prost then passed Fittipaldi for fifth position. Herbert crashed out in the second Lotus with gearbox problems that he was having for more 20 laps (subsequently). On lap 71 Berger attempted to overtake Hill and ended up making contact. Hill quickly rejoined the race but Berger was forced to retire. Senna won his third race of the season, followed by Hill in second, Alesi third, Prost fourth and Fittipaldi fifth.

=== Round 7: Canada ===
For the only North American race in Montreal, Williams qualified first and second, with Prost taking pole position yet again. The Benettons of Schumacher and Patrese took third and fourth positions and the two Ferraris of Berger and Alesi taking fifth and sixth. Hill had a good start and beat Prost off the line, the Benettons were slow to start and were overtaken by Berger and Senna (Senna had qualified eight). By the end of the first lap Hill was leading followed by Prost, Berger, Senna and Schumacher.

On the second lap Senna overtook Berger to take third position. On lap 6 Prost took the lead from Hill. Shortly after Schumacher passed Berger and five laps later so did teammate Patrese. By lap 15 Prost was leading followed by Hill, Senna, Schumacher and Patrese.

During the pit stops Hill encountered a problem and his pace slowed allowing Senna and Schumacher to pass him. This gave Schumacher the opportunity to chase down Senna for second position. Senna, with Schumacher closing in fast, suffered an electrical failure, meaning he had to retire from the race. The race was won by Prost (celebrating his fourth win of the season) followed by Schumacher, Hill, Berger and Brundle, the first of a four-win streak which would see him distance himself from Senna in the battle for the championship.

=== Round 8: France ===
At the French Grand Prix there was a huge turnout of fans to see French driver Prost take his eighth consecutive pole position. However it was Hill that took pole position with Prost in second. Behind the Williams 1–2 were the two Ligiers of Brundle and Blundell with Senna taking fifth position on the grid. As the race started Schumacher managed to pass Alesi to get into sixth position with no change in order to the top five drivers.

The Williams cars pulled away from the rest of the pack with Brundle also pulling away from Blundell, who was keeping up Senna and Schumacher. However, on lap 21 Blundell spun off under pressure from Senna and had to retire. During the mid-race pit stops Prost managed to get ahead of Hill as Senna and Schumacher closed the gap behind Brundle.

During the second set of pit stops Prost was still leading, albeit by two-tenths of a second and Senna and Schumacher overtook the Ligier of Brundle. Shortly after Schumacher passed Senna in traffic and began to pull away. Prost won the race followed by Hill, Schumacher, Senna and Brundle.

At this point in the season (halfway through) Prost was leading the World Championship with 57 points. Senna was in second with 45 points. In third place was Hill with 28 points. Schumacher took fourth place with 24 points, and Brundle was in fifth place with 9 points. In the Constructors' Championship Williams were easily ahead of McLaren with 85 points compared to their 48. Benetton were third with 29 points, and Ligier were fourth with 15.

=== Round 9: Britain ===
As Nigel Mansell had retired from Formula One the previous year, the British crowd were mainly rooting for Damon Hill, considering his good start to the season. The Williams cars took their usual positions on the grid, 1–2, with Prost in pole position and Hill in second. Fellow Brit Martin Brundle took sixth position on the grid with Patrese in fifth, Senna in fourth and Schumacher in third. As the race began Hill managed to get ahead of Prost and Senna got ahead of Schumacher. An enthusiastic home crowd cheered as Hill completed the first lap in first position followed by Senna, Prost, Schumacher and Patrese.

Andretti spun off at Copse on the first lap ending his race immediately, while Hill was extending his lead both Prost and Schumacher were unable to pass Senna. Prost finally managed to overtake on the ninth lap, but Hill's lead at this point was over five seconds. On lap 13 Schumacher overtook Senna for third position and quickly pulled away from the Brazilian. Prost managed to close in on Hill, narrowing the gap to three seconds during the mid-race pit stops. Shortly after, Badoer retired with electrical failure, bringing out the Safety Car and reducing the three second gap between the Williams drivers to no gap at all. Two laps after the Safety Car Hill's engine blew, meaning he had to retire from the race. Fellow Brit Brundle's gearbox failed on lap 54.

On the final lap of the race Senna retired for the third consecutive season at Silverstone as his McLaren ran out of fuel. Prost took his sixth win of the season and the fiftieth of his career. In second position was Schumacher, Patrese third, fourth was Johnny Herbert (one of only three remaining Brits in the race) and Senna was classified fifth.

=== Round 10: Germany ===
Williams took the front row of the grid in Hockenheim with Prost in Pole Position. Schumacher took third followed by Senna and Blundell. Prost had a poor start with Hill easily passing him as the lights went out. Senna also had a poor start, spinning, sending him to the back of the grid. He almost immediately gained a place however when Brundle also spun, at the chicane. Hill led by the end of the first lap followed by Schumacher, Prost, Blundell and Patrese.

Prost picked up speed after his poor start, passing Schumacher on lap 6. By lap 9 he was near Hill. However behind him Berger attempted to overtake Suzuki ending in a collision with Suzuki spinning off. The Marshals waved yellow flags and Hill slowed down slightly. Prost saw and opportunity and overtook Hill for the lead. Shortly after he was given a stop-go penalty for overtaking under yellow flag conditions, sending him down the grid and into fifth position, where he was struck from behind by Benetton of Patrese. Meanwhile, Senna was making good progress through the pack following his spin at the beginning.

Unlike the rest of the cars on the track Senna and the two Williams did not pit meaning Hill had a fifteen-second lead over Prost, with Senna up to seventh. The Brazilian soon passed Berger for sixth position and then three laps later Patrese for fifth. By the penultimate lap Prost was seven second behind Hill when his left rear tyre punctured spinning him out and bringing his retirement from the race. Prost won his seventh and final race of the season. Schumacher finished second followed by Blundell, Senna and Patrese.

=== Round 11: Hungary ===
Prost secured pole in Hungary followed by teammate Hill. Schumacher took third position on the grid followed by Senna and Patrese. On the parade lap Prost stalled meaning that he had to start the race from the back of the grid. Schumacher had a poor start to the race and was quickly passed by Senna, Berger and Patrese. By the end of the first lap Hill was leading followed by Senna, Berger, Patrese and Schumacher.

Schumacher attempted to overtake Patrese on lap 4, but in the process spun, sending him down to tenth. Both McLaren cars were suffering with throttle problems and as Andretti slowed down in front of Schumacher on lap 16 he spun again forcing him down into fourteenth position, just behind Prost who was making his way back up the field. On lap 18 Senna was forced to retire with throttle problems. As cars pitted, Schumacher and the two Williams stayed out, closing the gap between Hill, Prost and Schumacher. By the end of this lap Hill was leading, followed by Patrese, Prost, Schumacher and Berger.

Shortly after Prost began suffering problems with his rear wing, forcing him to pit, rejoining the race seven laps behind. On lap 23 Alesi spun off and hit armco barrier over the gravel trap and retired whilst trying to lap backmarkers and Patrese let Schumacher past him. This put Schumacher into second place, however three laps later he had to retire because of fuel pump problems. Berger pitted from third and rejoined the race fifth, but quickly overtook Brundle and then Warwick to reclaim third position. Hill won the race, his first ever Formula One victory. Patrese finished in second followed by Berger, Warwick and Brundle.

=== Round 12: Belgium ===
Williams took another grid 1–2 with Prost out qualifying Hill again. Schumacher qualified third, Alesi fourth and Senna fifth. At the beginning of the race Schumacher suffered another poor start allowing Alesi and Senna to pass him. By the end of the first lap Prost was leading followed by Hill, Senna, Alesi and Schumacher.

On lap 4 Alesi was forced to retire because of problems with his suspension, allowing Schumacher to take fourth position. He then set off after Senna and overtook him on lap 10 by going on the grass to get around him. The first wave of pit stops did not change the order at the front of the pack with Prost still leading, followed by Hill, Schumacher, Senna and Suzuki. On lap 15 Suzuki's gearbox failed and he had to retire from the race. Prost had trouble in the pits during his second stop meaning that Senna and Schumacher rejoined the race ahead of him.

On lap 41 Prost beat the lap record while he was chasing down Schumacher discovering that since he was only one-tenth-of-a-second quicker he couldn't chase the other two down and thus had to settle for third. Hill won the race, ending the Constructors' Championship, with Schumacher second, Prost third, Senna fourth, and Herbert fifth.

The Belgian Grand Prix was three quarters of the way through 1993's calendar and Prost was leading the World Championship with 81 points. Senna was second with 54 points, Hill was third with 48 points, Schumacher was fourth with 42 points, and Patrese was fifth with 18 points. As a result of this race Williams had won the Constructors' Championship with 129 points ahead of Benetton with 60, and McLaren with 56 points.

=== Round 13: Italy ===
As usual the two Williams cars took the front two positions on the grid at Monza, with Prost again out qualifying Hill. Alesi qualified third, Senna fourth and Schumacher fifth. As the lights went out Alesi managed to get ahead of Hill and as Senna tried to do the same there was contact sending Senna into ninth place and Hill into tenth. Midway through the lap Schumacher took second position from Alesi and as they finished the first lap Prost was in the lead, followed by Schumacher, Alesi, Berger and Herbert.

At the end of lap 8 Prost was still leading ahead of his two main championship rivals Senna and Hill, who were both outside of the points. As Senna tried to take sixth position from Brundle they collided and the accident retired both of them from the race. Hill had gained two places as a result of the collision and was now in sixth. He gained a further two places when Johnny Herbert spun out into the tyre barrier at Parabolica on lap 15 and Berger's suspension failed on the following lap. On lap 18 he passed Alesi and on lap 22 Schumacher's engine failed. Blundell had also hit the barrier at Parabolica like Herbert and retired with a right rear puncture just after pitting by lap 21. This left Hill in second position, five seconds behind Prost.

At the end of lap 48, five from the end, Prost still led Hill by two seconds, and looked set to seal his fourth Drivers' Championship. But on lap 49, the Frenchman's engine failed. This allowed Hill to take his third consecutive win, with Alesi in a fine second, Andretti third, Wendlinger fourth and Patrese fifth.

=== Round 14: Portugal ===
Two major news stories broke as Formula One descended on Estoril, Portugal. Firstly Alain Prost announced that after only a year back in the sport that he would retire at the end of the 1993 season. Secondly Michael Andretti had been fired from McLaren after a very poor performance during the season (his podium finish in Italy was notwithstanding). Mika Häkkinen, the team's test driver, would be his replacement. Häkkinen would stay with the team until his retirement in 2001 after nine years.

The Williams cars qualified in their usual 1–2 position, but this time it was Hill that was in Pole Position with Prost in second. For his first race at McLaren Häkkinen qualified third ahead of Senna in fourth and Alesi in fifth. Despite being on Pole Position, Hill stalled his car during the parade lap and had to start the race from the back of the grid. As the lights went out Prost was overtaken by Alesi and the two McLarens with Alesi ahead of Senna and Senna ahead of Häkkinen. By the end of the first lap Alesi was in the lead followed by Senna, Häkkinen, Prost and Schumacher.

The top five stayed close together, however the two Williams's cars and Schumacher were on a one-stop strategy unlike the McLarens and the Ferraris. On lap 20, whilst Alesi, Häkkinen and Schumacher were in the pits, Senna's engine blew, meaning he had to retire from the race. Alesi lost position to Häkkinen and Schumacher during the pit stop. This left Prost leading ahead of Blundell, Hill, Häkkinen, and Schumacher. The German passed Häkkinen on lap 25 and began to pull away. Prost stopped on lap 29, however Schumacher rejoined the race ahead of him. When Hill stopped Schumacher was leading followed by Prost, Häkkinen, Hill and Alesi.

On lap 33 Häkkinen crashed into the wall at the last corner, and on lap 36 Berger's suspension failed. Blundell crashed out of the race from sixth position on lap 52 as Prost began to make a move on Schumacher. Second place, however, was all Prost needed to win the championship so he decided not to take any risks. Patrese was doing well in fifth position but on lap 64 he also crashed out of the race. Schumacher had a minor incident but continued, so he could keep the lead. Schumacher won his second Grand Prix Race (the first being the Belgian Grand Prix the year before). Prost finished second, making him the 1993 Formula One World Champion. Hill finished third, Alesi fourth, and Wendlinger fifth.

With only two races to follow the Portuguese Grand Prix, Prost, with a 34-point lead over Senna, was crowned the 1993 Formula One World Champion (his fourth World Championship). There was however still a battle for second position between Hill, Senna, and Schumacher. Hill was second with 62 points, Senna third with 53, Schumacher fourth with 52 and Patrese fifth with 20 points. Williams had already won the Constructors' Championship at the Belgian Grand Prix, but again there was still a battle for second between Benetton (72 points) and McLaren (60 points). Ferrari was fourth with 23 points.

Backmarker team Scuderia Italia withdrew from Formula One after this race.

=== Round 15: Japan ===
Prost took pole position at the Suzuka circuit in Japan. Senna had qualified second, Häkkinen third, Schumacher fourth and Berger fifth. Disappointingly Hill only managed to qualify sixth. At the beginning of the race Senna managed to pass Prost and Berger overtook Schumacher. Eddie Irvine (the fifth driver to occupy Jordan's second seat that year) managed to overtake Hill and then Schumacher. Hill briefly overtook Schumacher but the German very quickly regained his place. Senna was leading by the end of the first lap followed by Prost, Häkkinen, Berger and Irvine. Schumacher passed Irvine on the second lap with Hill passing him two laps later.

Schumacher and Hill then closed in on Berger. At the end of lap 9 the three cars came out of the final chicane nose to tail as Hill passed Schumacher on the main straight to take fifth position. On lap 11 Hill got a very good run at overtaking Berger going into the chicane. Berger took the inside line and Hill tried to overtake on the outside, but had to give up on the move. Schumacher having stayed on the inside was unable to stop in time and ended up hitting Hill's right rear tyre damaging his left front suspension and resulting in his retirement from the race. Hill came out of the accident unscathed and managed to make up a place on the following lap when Berger pitted.

At the front of the pack Prost had taken the lead when Senna pitted. Shortly after it began to rain, which was a major advantage for Prost and those drivers that hadn't pitted, as they would only have to do one less stop. Senna began to catch Prost as the track became wet and on lap 21 as the rain became heavier Senna overtook the Frenchman on the approach to the Spoon Curve. At the end of the lap Senna's lead was over two seconds and the pair pitted for wet tyres. Senna pulled away rapidly and by lap 27 his lead was over thirty seconds. Prost then left the track at the first corner, but was able to rejoin the race behind Senna, one lap down. Unable to lap Hill Senna was re-passed by Irvine, who had already been lapped, but was chasing Hill for fourth position. Irvine, who was also still on wets, challenged Hill going into the first corner, but was unable to complete the move, whilst Senna was being held up by the pair. Senna lost fifteen seconds behind the pair once he had forced his way through. At the end of lap 42 both Senna and Prost pitted for Slicks and Senna's lead was back up to twenty-four seconds.

Behind, Barrichello passed Irvine during the stop for wet tyres. On lap 41 Berger's engine failed resulting in his retirement. With four laps to go and battling Warwick for sixth position, Irvine ran into the back of him forcing Warwick to retire. Irvine managed to continue and scored a point in his first race. His debut was marred slightly by the events of the post-race meeting where he and Senna exchanged strong words and Senna punched him. Senna won the race followed by Prost in second, Häkkinen in third which was his first ever podium finish, Hill fourth, Barrichello's fifth-place finish was the best of his career to that point, with Irvine finishing sixth in his debut Formula One race.

=== Round 16: Australia ===
The last race of the 1993 season took place in Adelaide, South Australia. If Williams took pole position at this race they would have been on pole for the entire season, however in Adelaide it was Senna that started the race in pole position. Prost was second on the grid, Hill third, Schumacher fourth and Häkkinen fifth. As the race started the top four stayed in the same order, however Berger jumped Häkkinen for fifth position.

While Senna started to pull away slightly the two Williams and Schumacher stayed close together. Schumacher passed Hill on lap 8 and then set about passing Prost. He had to pit early, on lap 15, and rejoined fourth. However, his engine failed five laps later. During the first set of pit stops Häkkinen was slow and Alesi and Brundle managed to get ahead of him. Nine laps after Schumacher retired due to engine failure Häkkinen was forced to do the same.

During the second set of pit stops Senna kept his ten-second lead whilst Alesi managed to get ahead of Berger and Patrese passed Brundle. On lap 61 Hill attempted to overtake Prost by surprise for second place. However, as Prost moved over to block him Hill had to back off and ended up spinning, losing time but not his position. Patrese was set to finish sixth in his 256th and final race, but his fuel pressure dropped on the final lap. Senna won the final race of the season, with Prost finishing second in his final Formula One race. Hill finished third, followed by Alesi in fourth and Berger in fifth. This would be Senna's final ever victory in F1, before his death in 1994.

At the end of the season Prost finished his one-year return to Formula One with the World Championship and 99 career points. His rival, Senna, finished second with 73 points. In third was Hill with 69 points. Fourth was Schumacher with 52 points. Fifth place in the championship went to Patrese, who had earned 20 points. Williams dominated the Constructors' Championship throughout the year finishing first with 168 points. This was double the points of McLaren who finished second.

== Results and standings ==
=== Grands Prix ===
Round	Grand Prix	Pole position	Fastest lap	Winning driver	Winning constructor	Report
1	(South Africa) South African Grand Prix	(France) Alain Prost	(France) Alain Prost	(France) Alain Prost	(United Kingdom) Williams-Renault	Report
2	(Brazil) Brazilian Grand Prix	(France) Alain Prost	(Germany) Michael Schumacher	(Brazil) Ayrton Senna	(United Kingdom) McLaren-Ford	Report
3	(United Kingdom) European Grand Prix	(France) Alain Prost	(Brazil) Ayrton Senna	(Brazil) Ayrton Senna	(United Kingdom) McLaren-Ford	Report
4	(Italy) San Marino Grand Prix	(France) Alain Prost	(France) Alain Prost	(France) Alain Prost	(United Kingdom) Williams-Renault	Report
5	(Spain) Spanish Grand Prix	(France) Alain Prost	(Germany) Michael Schumacher	(France) Alain Prost	(United Kingdom) Williams-Renault	Report
6	Monaco Grand Prix	(France) Alain Prost	(France) Alain Prost	(Brazil) Ayrton Senna	(United Kingdom) McLaren-Ford	Report
7	(Canada) Canadian Grand Prix	(France) Alain Prost	(Germany) Michael Schumacher	(France) Alain Prost	(United Kingdom) Williams-Renault	Report
8	(France) French Grand Prix	(United Kingdom) Damon Hill	(Germany) Michael Schumacher	(France) Alain Prost	(United Kingdom) Williams-Renault	Report
9	(United Kingdom) British Grand Prix	(France) Alain Prost	(United Kingdom) Damon Hill	(France) Alain Prost	(United Kingdom) Williams-Renault	Report
10	(Germany) German Grand Prix	(France) Alain Prost	(Germany) Michael Schumacher	(France) Alain Prost	(United Kingdom) Williams-Renault	Report
11	(Hungary) Hungarian Grand Prix	(France) Alain Prost	(France) Alain Prost	(United Kingdom) Damon Hill	(United Kingdom) Williams-Renault	Report
12	(Belgium) Belgian Grand Prix	(France) Alain Prost	(France) Alain Prost	(United Kingdom) Damon Hill	(United Kingdom) Williams-Renault	Report
13	(Italy) Italian Grand Prix	(France) Alain Prost	(United Kingdom) Damon Hill	(United Kingdom) Damon Hill	(United Kingdom) Williams-Renault	Report
14	(Portugal) Portuguese Grand Prix	(United Kingdom) Damon Hill	(United Kingdom) Damon Hill	(Germany) Michael Schumacher	(United Kingdom) Benetton-Ford	Report
15	(Japan) Japanese Grand Prix	(France) Alain Prost	(France) Alain Prost	(Brazil) Ayrton Senna	(United Kingdom) McLaren-Ford	Report
16	(Australia) Australian Grand Prix	(Brazil) Ayrton Senna	(United Kingdom) Damon Hill	(Brazil) Ayrton Senna	(United Kingdom) McLaren-Ford	Report

=== Points scoring system ===
Points were awarded to the top six finishers in each race as follows:

Position	1st	2nd	3rd	4th	5th	6th	Ref
Points	10	6	4	3	2	1	

=== World Drivers' Championship standings ===
Pos.	Driver	RSA (South Africa)	BRA (Brazil)	EUR (United Kingdom)	SMR (Italy)	ESP (Spain)	MON (Monaco)	CAN (Canada)	FRA (France)	GBR (United Kingdom)	GER (Germany)	HUN (Hungary)	BEL (Belgium)	ITA (Italy)	POR (Portugal)	JPN (Japan)	AUS (Australia)	Points
1	(France) Alain Prost	1^{P}^{F}	Ret^{P}	3^{P}	1^{P}^{F}	1^{P}	4^{P}^{F}	1^{P}	1	1^{P}	1^{P}	12^{P}^{F}	3^{P}^{F}	12^{P}^{†}	2	2^{P}^{F}	2	99
2	(Brazil) Ayrton Senna	2	1	1^{F}	Ret	2	1	18^{†}	4	5^{†}	4	Ret	4	Ret	Ret	1	1^{P}	73
3	(United Kingdom) Damon Hill	Ret	2	2	Ret	Ret	2	3	2^{P}	Ret^{F}	15^{†}	1	1	1^{F}	3^{P}^{F}	4	3^{F}	69
4	(Germany) Michael Schumacher	Ret	3^{F}	Ret	2	3^{F}	Ret	2^{F}	3^{F}	2	2^{F}	Ret	2	Ret	1	Ret	Ret	52
5	(Italy) Riccardo Patrese	Ret	Ret	5	Ret	4	Ret	Ret	10	3	5	2	6	5	16^{†}	Ret	8^{†}	20
6	(France) Jean Alesi	Ret	8	Ret	Ret	Ret	3	Ret	Ret	9	7	Ret	Ret	2	4	Ret	4	16
7	(United Kingdom) Martin Brundle	Ret	Ret	Ret	3	Ret	6	5	5	14^{†}	8	5	7	Ret	6	9	6	13
8	(Austria) Gerhard Berger	6^{†}	Ret	Ret	Ret	6	14^{†}	4	14	Ret	6	3	10^{†}	Ret	Ret	Ret	5	12
9	(United Kingdom) Johnny Herbert	Ret	4	4	8^{†}	Ret	Ret	10	Ret	4	10	Ret	5	Ret	Ret	11	Ret	11
10	(United Kingdom) Mark Blundell	3	5	Ret	Ret	7	Ret	Ret	Ret	7	3	7	11^{†}	Ret	Ret	7	9	10
11	(United States) Michael Andretti	Ret	Ret	Ret	Ret	5	8	14	6	Ret	Ret	Ret	8	3				7
12	(Austria) Karl Wendlinger	Ret	Ret	Ret	Ret	Ret	13	6	Ret	Ret	9	6	Ret	4	5	Ret	15^{†}	7
13	(Finland) JJ Lehto	5	Ret	Ret	4^{†}	Ret	Ret	7	Ret	8	Ret	Ret	9	Ret	7	8	Ret	5
14	(Brazil) Christian Fittipaldi	4	Ret	7	Ret	8	5	9	8	12^{†}	11	Ret	Ret	8	9			5
15	(Finland) Mika Häkkinen														Ret	3	Ret	4
16	(United Kingdom) Derek Warwick	7^{†}	9	Ret	Ret	13	Ret	16	13	6	17	4	Ret	Ret	15^{†}	14^{†}	10	4
17	(France) Philippe Alliot	Ret	7	Ret	5	Ret	12	Ret	9	11	12	8	12	9	10			2
18	(Brazil) Rubens Barrichello	Ret	Ret	10^{†}	Ret	12	9	Ret	7	10	Ret	Ret	Ret	Ret	13	5	11	2
19	(Italy) Fabrizio Barbazza	Ret	Ret	6	6	Ret	11	Ret	Ret									2
20	(Italy) Alessandro Zanardi	Ret	6	8	Ret	14^{†}	7	11	Ret	Ret	Ret	Ret	DNQ					1
21	(France) Érik Comas	Ret	10	9	Ret	9	Ret	8	16^{†}	Ret	Ret	Ret	Ret	6	11	Ret	12	1
22	(United Kingdom) Eddie Irvine															6	Ret	1
—	(Italy) Pierluigi Martini									Ret	14	Ret	Ret	7	8	10	Ret	0
—	(Japan) Aguri Suzuki	Ret	Ret	Ret	9	10	Ret	13	12	Ret	Ret	Ret	Ret	Ret	Ret	Ret	7	0
—	(Italy) Luca Badoer	Ret	12	DNQ	7	Ret	DNQ	15	Ret	Ret	Ret	Ret	13	10	14			0
—	(Belgium) Thierry Boutsen			Ret	Ret	11	Ret	12	11	Ret	13	9	Ret					0
—	(Italy) Andrea de Cesaris	Ret	Ret	Ret	Ret	DSQ	10	Ret	15	NC	Ret	11	Ret	13^{†}	12	Ret	13	0
—	(Japan) Ukyo Katayama	Ret	Ret	Ret	Ret	Ret	Ret	17	Ret	13	Ret	10	15	14	Ret	Ret	Ret	0
—	(Italy) Michele Alboreto	Ret	11	11	DNQ	DNQ	Ret	DNQ	DNQ	DNQ	16	Ret	14	Ret	Ret			0
—	(Portugal) Pedro Lamy													11^{†}	Ret	13^{†}	Ret	0
—	(Japan) Toshio Suzuki															12	14	0
—	(France) Jean-Marc Gounon															Ret	Ret	0
—	(Italy) Ivan Capelli	Ret	DNQ															0
—	(Italy) Marco Apicella													Ret				0
—	(Italy) Emanuele Naspetti														Ret			0
Pos.	Driver	RSA (South Africa)	BRA (Brazil)	EUR (United Kingdom)	SMR (Italy)	ESP (Spain)	MON (Monaco)	CAN (Canada)	FRA (France)	GBR (United Kingdom)	GER (Germany)	HUN (Hungary)	BEL (Belgium)	ITA (Italy)	POR (Portugal)	JPN (Japan)	AUS (Australia)	Points

Key
Colour	Result
Gold	Winner
Silver	Second place
Bronze	Third place
Green	Other points position
Blue	Other classified position
Blue	Not classified, finished (NC)
Purple	Not classified, retired (Ret)
Red	Did not qualify (DNQ)
Black	Disqualified (DSQ)
White	Did not start (DNS)
White	Race cancelled (C)
Blank	Did not practice (DNP)
Blank	Excluded (EX)
Blank	Did not arrive (DNA)
Blank	Withdrawn (WD)
Blank	Did not enter (empty cell)
Annotation	Meaning
P	Pole position
F	Fastest lap

Notes:

- † – Driver did not finish the Grand Prix but was classified, as he completed more than 90% of the race distance.

=== World Constructors' Championship standings ===
Points are calculated as the sum of the points for the drivers of each team.

Pos.	Constructor	No.	RSA (South Africa)	BRA (Brazil)	EUR (United Kingdom)	SMR (Italy)	ESP (Spain)	MON (Monaco)	CAN (Canada)	FRA (France)	GBR (United Kingdom)	GER (Germany)	HUN (Hungary)	BEL (Belgium)	ITA (Italy)	POR (Portugal)	JPN (Japan)	AUS (Australia)	Points
1	(United Kingdom) Williams-Renault	0	Ret	2	2	Ret	Ret	2	3	2^{P}	Ret^{F}	15^{†}	1	1	1^{F}	3^{P}^{F}	4	3^{F}	168
1	(United Kingdom) Williams-Renault	2	1^{P}^{F}	Ret^{P}	3^{P}	1^{P}^{F}	1^{P}	4^{P}^{F}	1^{P}	1	1^{P}	1^{P}	12^{P}^{F}	3^{P}^{F}	12^{P}^{†}	2	2^{P}^{F}	2	168
2	(United Kingdom) McLaren-Ford	7	Ret	Ret	Ret	Ret	5	8	14	6	Ret	Ret	Ret	8	3	Ret	3	Ret	84
2	(United Kingdom) McLaren-Ford	8	2	1	1^{F}	Ret	2	1	18^{†}	4	5^{†}	4	Ret	4	Ret	Ret	1	1^{P}	84
3	(United Kingdom) Benetton-Ford	5	Ret	3^{F}	Ret	2	3^{F}	Ret	2^{F}	3^{F}	2	2^{F}	Ret	2	Ret	1	Ret	Ret	72
3	(United Kingdom) Benetton-Ford	6	Ret	Ret	5	Ret	4	Ret	Ret	10	3	5	2	6	5	16^{†}	Ret	8^{†}	72
4	(Italy) Ferrari	27	Ret	8	Ret	Ret	Ret	3	Ret	Ret	9	7	Ret	Ret	2	4	Ret	4	28
4	(Italy) Ferrari	28	6^{†}	Ret	Ret	Ret	6	14^{†}	4	14	Ret	6	3	10^{†}	Ret	Ret	Ret	5	28
5	(France) Ligier-Renault	25	Ret	Ret	Ret	3	Ret	6	5	5	14^{†}	8	5	7	Ret	6	9	6	23
5	(France) Ligier-Renault	26	3	5	Ret	Ret	7	Ret	Ret	Ret	7	3	7	11^{†}	Ret	Ret	7	9	23
6	(United Kingdom) Lotus-Ford	11	Ret	6	8	Ret	14^{†}	7	11	Ret	Ret	Ret	Ret	DNQ	11^{†}	Ret	13^{†}	Ret	12
6	(United Kingdom) Lotus-Ford	12	Ret	4	4	8^{†}	Ret	Ret	10	Ret	4	10	Ret	5	Ret	Ret	11	Ret	12
7	(Switzerland) Sauber	29	Ret	Ret	Ret	Ret	Ret	13	6	Ret	Ret	9	6	Ret	4	5	Ret	15^{†}	12
7	(Switzerland) Sauber	30	5	Ret	Ret	4^{†}	Ret	Ret	7	Ret	8	Ret	Ret	9	Ret	7	8	Ret	12
8	(Italy) Minardi-Ford	23	4	Ret	7	Ret	8	5	9	8	12^{†}	11	Ret	Ret	8	9	Ret	Ret	7
8	(Italy) Minardi-Ford	24	Ret	Ret	6	6	Ret	11	Ret	Ret	Ret	14	Ret	Ret	7	8	10	Ret	7
9	(United Kingdom) Footwork-Mugen-Honda	9	7^{†}	9	Ret	Ret	13	Ret	16	13	6	17	4	Ret	Ret	15^{†}	14^{†}	10	4
9	(United Kingdom) Footwork-Mugen-Honda	10	Ret	Ret	Ret	9	10	Ret	13	12	Ret	Ret	Ret	Ret	Ret	Ret	Ret	7	4
10	(France) Larrousse-Lamborghini	19	Ret	7	Ret	5	Ret	12	Ret	9	11	12	8	12	9	10	12	14	3
10	(France) Larrousse-Lamborghini	20	Ret	10	9	Ret	9	Ret	8	16^{†}	Ret	Ret	Ret	Ret	6	11	Ret	12	3
11	(Republic of Ireland) Jordan-Hart	14	Ret	Ret	10^{†}	Ret	12	9	Ret	7	10	Ret	Ret	Ret	Ret	13	5	11	3
11	(Republic of Ireland) Jordan-Hart	15	Ret	DNQ	Ret	Ret	11	Ret	12	11	Ret	13	9	Ret	Ret	Ret	6	Ret	3
—	(Italy) Lola-Ferrari	21	Ret	11	11	DNQ	DNQ	Ret	DNQ	DNQ	DNQ	16	Ret	14	Ret	Ret			0
—	(Italy) Lola-Ferrari	22	Ret	12	DNQ	7	Ret	DNQ	15	Ret	Ret	Ret	Ret	13	10	14			0
—	(United Kingdom) Tyrrell-Yamaha	3	Ret	Ret	Ret	Ret	Ret	Ret	17	Ret	13	Ret	10	15	14	Ret	Ret	Ret	0
—	(United Kingdom) Tyrrell-Yamaha	4	Ret	Ret	Ret	Ret	DSQ	10	Ret	15	NC	Ret	11	Ret	13	12	Ret	13	0
Pos.	Constructor	No.	RSA (South Africa)	BRA (Brazil)	EUR (United Kingdom)	SMR (Italy)	ESP (Spain)	MON (Monaco)	CAN (Canada)	FRA (France)	GBR (United Kingdom)	GER (Germany)	HUN (Hungary)	BEL (Belgium)	ITA (Italy)	POR (Portugal)	JPN (Japan)	AUS (Australia)	Points

Notes:

- † – Driver did not finish the Grand Prix but was classified, as he completed more than 90% of the race distance.

== Non-championship event results ==
The 1993 season also included a single event which did not count towards the World Championship, the Formula One Indoor Trophy at the Bologna Motor Show.

Race name	Venue	Date	Winning driver	Constructor	Report
(Italy) Formula One Indoor Trophy	Bologna Motor Show	4–5 December	(Brazil) Rubens Barrichello	(Republic of Ireland) Jordan	Report
