= 1993 Belgian Grand Prix =

- Race 12 of 16 in the 1993 Formula One World Championship
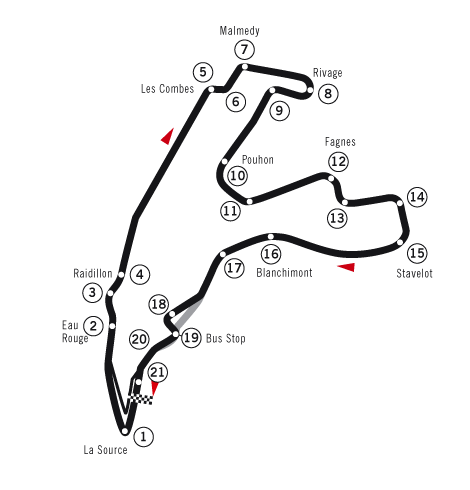

Race details
- Date: 29 August 1993
- Official name: LI Grand Prix de Belgique
- Location: Circuit de Spa-Francorchamps; Francorchamps, Wallonia, Belgium
- Course: Permanent racing facility
- Course length: 6.940 km (4.312 miles)
- Distance: 44 laps, 305.341 km (189.730 miles)
- Weather: Sunny and clear

Pole position
Driver	(France) Alain Prost	Williams-Renault
- Time: 1:47.571

Fastest lap
Driver	(France) Alain Prost	Williams-Renault
- Time: 1:51.095 on lap 41

Podium
First	(United Kingdom) Damon Hill	Williams-Renault
Second	(Germany) Michael Schumacher	Benetton-Ford
Third	(France) Alain Prost	Williams-Renault

The 1993 Belgian Grand Prix was a Formula One motor race held at Spa-Francorchamps on 29 August 1993. It was the twelfth race of the 1993 Formula One World Championship.

The 44-lap race was won by Briton Damon Hill, driving a Williams-Renault. Hill's French teammate, Alain Prost, took pole position and led the first 30 laps, before he suffered a slow pit stop and dropped to third behind Hill and German Michael Schumacher in the Benetton-Ford. Hill went on to win by 3.6 seconds from Schumacher with Prost a further 11 seconds back; the 1–3 finish secured Williams their second consecutive Constructors' Championship.

Lotus driver Alessandro Zanardi was withdrawn from the meeting following a huge crash in Friday practice, which ultimately ended his season. In the race itself, his team-mate Johnny Herbert scored the final points ever for Team Lotus with his 5th position. Local driver Thierry Boutsen retired from Formula One following the race (after his race ended on the first lap with a gearbox failure).

== Qualifying report ==
Once again, Alain Prost took pole position in his Williams-Renault with teammate Damon Hill alongside him on the front row of the grid, the two separated on this occasion by nearly nine-tenths of a second. On the second row were Michael Schumacher in the Benetton and Jean Alesi in the Ferrari, and on the third row were Ayrton Senna in the McLaren and Aguri Suzuki in the Footwork. Completing the top ten were Derek Warwick in the second Footwork, Riccardo Patrese in the second Benetton, JJ Lehto in the Sauber and Johnny Herbert in the Lotus.

=== Qualifying classification ===
Pos	No	Driver	Constructor	Q1	Q2	Gap
1	2	(France) Alain Prost	Williams-Renault	1:48.794	1:47.571	—
2	0	(United Kingdom) Damon Hill	Williams-Renault	1:48.716	1:48.466	+0.895
3	5	(Germany) Michael Schumacher	Benetton-Ford	1:50.305	1:49.075	+1.504
4	27	(France) Jean Alesi	Ferrari	1:52.159	1:49.825	+2.254
5	8	(Brazil) Ayrton Senna	McLaren-Ford	1:51.385	1:49.934	+2.363
6	10	(Japan) Aguri Suzuki	Footwork-Mugen-Honda	1:51.904	1:50.329	+2.758
7	9	(United Kingdom) Derek Warwick	Footwork-Mugen-Honda	1:52.730	1:50.628	+3.057
8	6	(Italy) Riccardo Patrese	Benetton-Ford	1:51.925	1:51.017	+3.446
9	30	(Finland) JJ Lehto	Sauber	1:52.210	1:51.048	+3.477
10	12	(United Kingdom) Johnny Herbert	Lotus-Ford	1:52.369	1:51.139	+3.568
11	25	(United Kingdom) Martin Brundle	Ligier-Renault	1:53.323	1:51.350	+3.779
12	29	(Austria) Karl Wendlinger	Sauber	1:53.139	1:51.440	+3.869
13	14	(Brazil) Rubens Barrichello	Jordan-Hart	1:53.235	1:51.711	+4.140
14	7	(United States) Michael Andretti	McLaren-Ford	1:53.554	1:51.833	+4.262
15	26	(United Kingdom) Mark Blundell	Ligier-Renault	1:53.030	1:51.916	+4.345
16	28	(Austria) Gerhard Berger	Ferrari	1:52.689	1:52.080	+4.509
17	4	(Italy) Andrea de Cesaris	Tyrrell-Yamaha	1:53.559	1:52.647	+5.076
18	19	(France) Philippe Alliot	Larrousse-Lamborghini	1:56.822	1:52.907	+5.336
19	20	(France) Érik Comas	Larrousse-Lamborghini	1:56.072	1:53.186	+5.615
20	15	(Belgium) Thierry Boutsen	Jordan-Hart	1:55.382	1:53.465	+5.894
21	24	(Italy) Pierluigi Martini	Minardi-Ford	1:54.968	1:53.526	+5.955
22	23	(Brazil) Christian Fittipaldi	Minardi-Ford	1:56.947	1:53.942	+6.371
23	3	(Japan) Ukyo Katayama	Tyrrell-Yamaha	1:55.271	1:54.551	+6.980
24	22	(Italy) Luca Badoer	Lola-Ferrari	1:57.599	1:54.978	+7.407
25	21	(Italy) Michele Alboreto	Lola-Ferrari	1:57.852	1:55.965	+8.394
NC	11	(Italy) Alessandro Zanardi	Lotus-Ford	—	—	—

== Race report ==
At the start, Senna got ahead of both Schumacher and Alesi with Alesi also getting by Schumacher. The order at the end of lap 1 was: Prost, Senna, Hill, Alesi, Schumacher and Suzuki.

Alesi retired then with suspension troubles on lap 4, releasing Schumacher. Schumacher then set off after Senna and overtook him on the grass during the first round of pitstops. The first stops did not change anything, with Prost leading from Hill, Schumacher and Senna. Suzuki was a distant fifth until his gearbox failed on lap 15. Prost had a slow second stop, which allowed Hill to take the lead. Schumacher then overtook Prost to claim second. Prost smashed the lap record on lap 41 in his chase of Schumacher, but he found out that he was just a tenth quicker and settled for third. Hill won, wrapping up the Constructors Championship for Williams with Schumacher and Prost close behind. Senna was a lonely fourth, while Herbert and Patrese, who spun after his pitstop, took the final points. Herbert's 2 points for 5th place would turn out to be the last points finish for a Team Lotus driver.

Thus, with three-quarters of the season gone, Prost was a full 28 points ahead and could sense the championship, having 81 points to Senna's 53. Hill was third with 48, Schumacher was fourth with 42, Patrese was fifth with 18, Brundle was sixth with 11, Herbert was seventh with 11 and Blundell was eighth with 10. In the Constructors Championship, Williams were World Champions with 129 points ahead of Benetton who were second with 60, McLaren close behind in third with 56 and Ligier fourth with 21 – their best performance in some years.

=== Race classification ===
Pos	No	Driver	Constructor	Laps	Time/Retired	Grid	Points
1	0	(United Kingdom) Damon Hill	Williams-Renault	44	1:24:32.124	2	10
2	5	(Germany) Michael Schumacher	Benetton-Ford	44	+ 3.668	3	6
3	2	(France) Alain Prost	Williams-Renault	44	+ 14.988	1	4
4	8	(Brazil) Ayrton Senna	McLaren-Ford	44	+ 1:39.763	5	3
5	12	(United Kingdom) Johnny Herbert	Lotus-Ford	43	+ 1 lap	10	2
6	6	(Italy) Riccardo Patrese	Benetton-Ford	43	+ 1 lap	8	1
7	25	(United Kingdom) Martin Brundle	Ligier-Renault	43	+ 1 lap	11	
8	7	(United States) Michael Andretti	McLaren-Ford	43	+ 1 lap	14	
9	30	(Finland) JJ Lehto	Sauber	43	+ 1 lap	9	
10	28	(Austria) Gerhard Berger	Ferrari	42	Collision	16	
11	26	(United Kingdom) Mark Blundell	Ligier-Renault	42	Collision	15	
12	19	(France) Philippe Alliot	Larrousse-Lamborghini	42	+ 2 laps	18	
13	22	(Italy) Luca Badoer	Lola-Ferrari	42	+ 2 laps	24	
14	21	(Italy) Michele Alboreto	Lola-Ferrari	41	+ 3 laps	25	
15	3	(Japan) Ukyo Katayama	Tyrrell-Yamaha	40	+ 4 laps	23	
Ret	20	(France) Érik Comas	Larrousse-Lamborghini	37	Fuel pump	19	
Ret	9	(United Kingdom) Derek Warwick	Footwork-Mugen-Honda	28	Engine	7	
Ret	29	(Austria) Karl Wendlinger	Sauber	27	Engine	12	
Ret	4	(Italy) Andrea de Cesaris	Tyrrell-Yamaha	24	Engine	17	
Ret	23	(Brazil) Christian Fittipaldi	Minardi-Ford	15	Accident	22	
Ret	24	(Italy) Pierluigi Martini	Minardi-Ford	15	Spun off	21	
Ret	10	(Japan) Aguri Suzuki	Footwork-Mugen-Honda	14	Gearbox	6	
Ret	14	(Brazil) Rubens Barrichello	Jordan-Hart	11	Wheel bearing	13	
Ret	27	(France) Jean Alesi	Ferrari	4	Suspension	4	
Ret	15	(Belgium) Thierry Boutsen	Jordan-Hart	0	Gearbox	20	
DNQ	11	(Italy) Alessandro Zanardi	Lotus-Ford				

== Championship standings after the race ==
Drivers' Championship standings

Pos	Driver	Points
1	(France) **Alain Prost***	81
2	(Brazil) **Ayrton Senna***	53
3	(United Kingdom) **Damon Hill***	48
4	(Germany) **Michael Schumacher***	42
5	(Italy) Riccardo Patrese	18

Constructors' Championship standings

	Pos	Constructor	Points
	1	(United Kingdom) **Williams-Renault**	129
1	2	(United Kingdom) Benetton-Ford	60
1	3	(United Kingdom) McLaren-Ford	56
	4	(France) Ligier-Renault	21
	5	(Italy) Ferrari	14

- Note: Only the top five positions are included for both sets of standings.
- **Bold text** indicates the 1993 World Constructors' Champions.
- Competitors in bold and marked with an asterisk still had a mathematical chance of becoming World Champion.

Previous race: 1993 Hungarian Grand Prix	FIA Formula One World Championship; 1993 season	Next race: 1993 Italian Grand Prix
Previous race: 1992 Belgian Grand Prix	Belgian Grand Prix	Next race: 1994 Belgian Grand Prix
