= 1993 Hungarian Grand Prix =

- Race 11 of 16 in the 1993 Formula One World Championship

Race details
- Date: 15 August 1993
- Official name: IX Marlboro Magyar Nagydíj
- Location: Hungaroring; Mogyoród, Pest, Hungary
- Course: Permanent racing facility
- Course length: 3.968 km (2.466 miles)
- Distance: 77 laps, 305.536 km (189.851 miles)

Pole position
Driver	(France) Alain Prost	Williams-Renault
- Time: 1:14.631

Fastest lap
Driver	(France) Alain Prost	Williams-Renault
- Time: 1:19.633 on lap 52

Podium
First	(United Kingdom) Damon Hill	Williams-Renault
Second	(Italy) Riccardo Patrese	Benetton-Ford
Third	(Austria) Gerhard Berger	Ferrari

The 1993 Hungarian Grand Prix was a Formula One motor race held at Hungaroring on 15 August 1993. It was the eleventh race of the 1993 Formula One World Championship.

The 77-lap race was won by Damon Hill, driving a Williams-Renault. After retiring from the lead in the previous two races, Hill finally took his first Formula One victory, becoming the first son of a World Champion to win a race himself. Riccardo Patrese finished second in a Benetton-Ford, achieving his final podium finish, with Gerhard Berger third in a Ferrari. Another F1 veteran, Derek Warwick, scored his final points by finishing fourth in a Footwork-Mugen-Honda.

Hill's teammate and Drivers' Championship leader, Alain Prost, took pole position, but stalled on the warm-up lap and had to start from the back of the grid. He subsequently lost several laps due to a faulty rear wing - giving an interview for French television while the Williams team worked on his car.

== Report ==
=== Qualifying ===
The two Williamses were 1-2 in qualifying in Hungary, with Prost on pole ahead of Hill, Schumacher, Senna, Patrese and Berger.

=== Race ===
Prost stalled on the parade lap, and had to start at the back. At the start, Schumacher got pushed down by Senna, Berger (who was already ahead of Patrese) and Patrese. Hill was leading Senna, Berger, Patrese, Schumacher and Alesi.

Schumacher tried to pass Berger on lap 4 but spun and dropped back to 10th. Both McLarens had throttle problems, Andretti slowing down in front of Schumacher on lap 16 and making Schumacher spin again, dropping down to 14th, right behind the recovering Prost. Senna also retired on lap 18 with throttle problems marking the first time since the race was introduced in 1986 that he failed to finish either 1st or 2nd, as everyone pitted except the Williamses and Schumacher. This left Hill ahead of Patrese, Prost, Schumacher, Berger and Alesi.

Then, Prost had to go into the pits because of problems with his rear wing. He rejoined seven laps behind. On lap 23, Alesi spun off as he hit the armco barrier and retired as a result of backmarkers just in front of the French Sicilian, meanwhile Patrese waved through Schumacher who took second. However, he retired three laps later with fuel pump problems. Berger pitted from third and rejoined in fifth but he quickly passed Brundle and then Warwick to get back third. Pierluigi Martini looked sure for scoring his first point since San Marino the previous year before the Minardi driver would later crash out of 6th position with only 18 laps to go. Hill took his first ever win ahead of Patrese, Berger, Warwick, Brundle and Wendlinger. It would also be the last race that former Williams driver Thierry Boutsen would finish, as the Belgian veteran retired from Formula 1 at the very next race after 10 years in the sport.

== Classification ==
=== Qualifying ===
Pos	No	Driver	Constructor	Q1	Q2	Gap
1	2	(France) Alain Prost	Williams-Renault	1:15.488	1:14.631	—
2	0	(United Kingdom) Damon Hill	Williams-Renault	1:16.135	1:14.835	+0.204
3	5	(Germany) Michael Schumacher	Benetton-Ford	1:16.005	1:15.228	+0.597
4	8	(Brazil) Ayrton Senna	McLaren-Ford	1:18.260	1:16.451	+1.820
5	6	(Italy) Riccardo Patrese	Benetton-Ford	1:17.755	1:16.561	+1.930
6	28	(Austria) Gerhard Berger	Ferrari	1:19.379	1:16.939	+2.308
7	24	(Italy) Pierluigi Martini	Minardi-Ford	1:19.129	1:17.366	+2.735
8	27	(France) Jean Alesi	Ferrari	1:19.438	1:17.480	+2.849
9	9	(United Kingdom) Derek Warwick	Footwork-Mugen-Honda	1:20.780	1:17.682	+3.051
10	10	(Japan) Aguri Suzuki	Footwork-Mugen-Honda	1:19.533	1:17.693	+3.062
11	7	(United States) Michael Andretti	McLaren-Ford	1:20.088	1:18.107	+3.476
12	26	(United Kingdom) Mark Blundell	Ligier-Renault	1:20.770	1:18.388	+3.757
13	25	(United Kingdom) Martin Brundle	Ligier-Renault	1:19.277	1:18.392	+3.761
14	23	(Brazil) Christian Fittipaldi	Minardi-Ford	1:20.953	1:18.446	+3.815
15	30	(Finland) JJ Lehto	Sauber	1:24.596	1:18.638	+4.007
16	14	(Brazil) Rubens Barrichello	Jordan-Hart	1:20.658	1:18.721	+4.090
17	29	(Austria) Karl Wendlinger	Sauber	1:20.590	1:18.840	+4.209
18	20	(France) Érik Comas	Larrousse-Lamborghini	1:21.049	1:19.305	+4.674
19	19	(France) Philippe Alliot	Larrousse-Lamborghini	1:20.959	1:19.320	+4.689
20	12	(United Kingdom) Johnny Herbert	Lotus-Ford	1:20.527	1:19.444	+4.813
21	11	(Italy) Alessandro Zanardi	Lotus-Ford	1:19.673	1:19.485	+4.854
22	4	(Italy) Andrea de Cesaris	Tyrrell-Yamaha	1:22.489	1:19.560	+4.929
23	3	(Japan) Ukyo Katayama	Tyrrell-Yamaha	1:22.668	1:20.270	+5.639
24	15	(Belgium) Thierry Boutsen	Jordan-Hart	1:21.484	1:20.482	+5.851
25	21	(Italy) Michele Alboreto	Lola-Ferrari	1:23.560	1:21.502	+6.871
26	22	(Italy) Luca Badoer	Lola-Ferrari	1:23.543	1:22.655	+8.024

=== Race ===
Pos	No	Driver	Constructor	Laps	Time/Retired	Grid	Points
1	0	(United Kingdom) Damon Hill	Williams-Renault	77	1:47:39.098	2	10
2	6	(Italy) Riccardo Patrese	Benetton-Ford	77	+ 1:11.915	5	6
3	28	(Austria) Gerhard Berger	Ferrari	77	+ 1:18.042	6	4
4	9	(United Kingdom) Derek Warwick	Footwork-Mugen-Honda	76	+ 1 Lap	9	3
5	25	(United Kingdom) Martin Brundle	Ligier-Renault	76	+ 1 Lap	13	2
6	29	(Austria) Karl Wendlinger	Sauber	76	+ 1 Lap	17	1
7	26	(United Kingdom) Mark Blundell	Ligier-Renault	76	+ 1 Lap	12	
8	19	(France) Philippe Alliot	Larrousse-Lamborghini	75	+ 2 Laps	19	
9	15	(Belgium) Thierry Boutsen	Jordan-Hart	75	+ 2 Laps	24	
10	3	(Japan) Ukyo Katayama	Tyrrell-Yamaha	73	+ 4 Laps	23	
11	4	(Italy) Andrea de Cesaris	Tyrrell-Yamaha	72	+ 5 Laps	22	
12	2	(France) Alain Prost	Williams-Renault	70	+ 7 Laps	1	
Ret	24	(Italy) Pierluigi Martini	Minardi-Ford	59	Accident	7	
Ret	20	(France) Érik Comas	Larrousse-Lamborghini	54	Engine	18	
Ret	11	(Italy) Alessandro Zanardi	Lotus-Ford	45	Gearbox	21	
Ret	10	(Japan) Aguri Suzuki	Footwork-Mugen-Honda	41	Spun Off	10	
Ret	21	(Italy) Michele Alboreto	Lola-Ferrari	39	Overheating	25	
Ret	12	(United Kingdom) Johnny Herbert	Lotus-Ford	38	Spun Off	20	
Ret	22	(Italy) Luca Badoer	Lola-Ferrari	37	Spun Off	26	
Ret	5	(Germany) Michael Schumacher	Benetton-Ford	26	Fuel Pump	3	
Ret	23	(Brazil) Christian Fittipaldi	Minardi-Ford	22	Suspension	14	
Ret	27	(France) Jean Alesi	Ferrari	22	Spun Off	8	
Ret	30	(Finland) JJ Lehto	Sauber	18	Engine	15	
Ret	8	(Brazil) Ayrton Senna	McLaren-Ford	17	Throttle	4	
Ret	7	(United States) Michael Andretti	McLaren-Ford	15	Throttle	11	
Ret	14	(Brazil) Rubens Barrichello	Jordan-Hart	0	Accident	16	

== Championship standings after the race ==
Drivers' Championship standings

	Pos	Driver	Points
	1	(France) **Alain Prost***	77
	2	(Brazil) **Ayrton Senna***	50
1	3	(United Kingdom) **Damon Hill***	38
1	4	(Germany) **Michael Schumacher***	36
	5	(Italy) Riccardo Patrese	17

Constructors' Championship standings

Pos	Constructor	Points
1	(United Kingdom) **Williams-Renault***	115
2	(United Kingdom) **McLaren-Ford***	53
3	(United Kingdom) **Benetton-Ford***	53
4	(France) Ligier-Renault	21
5	(Italy) Ferrari	14

- Note: Only the top five positions are included for both sets of standings.
- Competitors in bold and marked with an asterisk still had a mathematical chance of becoming World Champion.

Previous race: 1993 German Grand Prix	FIA Formula One World Championship; 1993 season	Next race: 1993 Belgian Grand Prix
Previous race: 1992 Hungarian Grand Prix	Hungarian Grand Prix	Next race: 1994 Hungarian Grand Prix
