= 1993 German Grand Prix =

- Race 10 of 16 in the 1993 Formula One World Championship

Race details
- Date: 25 July 1993
- Official name: Grosser Mobil 1 Preis von Deutschland
- Location: Hockenheimring; Hockenheim, Baden-Württemberg, Germany
- Course: Permanent racing facility
- Course length: 6.815 km (4.251 miles)
- Distance: 45 laps, 306.675 km (191.313 miles)
- Weather: Dry

Pole position
Driver	(France) Alain Prost	Williams-Renault
- Time: 1:38.748

Fastest lap
Driver	(Germany) Michael Schumacher	Benetton-Ford
- Time: 1:41.859 on lap 40

Podium
First	(France) Alain Prost	Williams-Renault
Second	(Germany) Michael Schumacher	Benetton-Ford
Third	(United Kingdom) Mark Blundell	Ligier-Renault

The 1993 German Grand Prix was a Formula One motor race held at Hockenheim on 25 July 1993. It was the tenth race of the 1993 Formula One World Championship.

The 45-lap race was won by Frenchman Alain Prost, driving a Williams-Renault, after he started from pole position. Prost's British teammate Damon Hill led for most of the race, only to be denied his first F1 win by a tyre failure on the penultimate lap. Prost duly took his seventh win of the season, and his 51st and final Grand Prix victory overall, with local driver Michael Schumacher second in a Benetton-Ford and another Briton, Mark Blundell, third in a Ligier-Renault.

== Qualifying changes ==
From this race all 26 cars would be permitted to qualify and start the race.

== Report ==
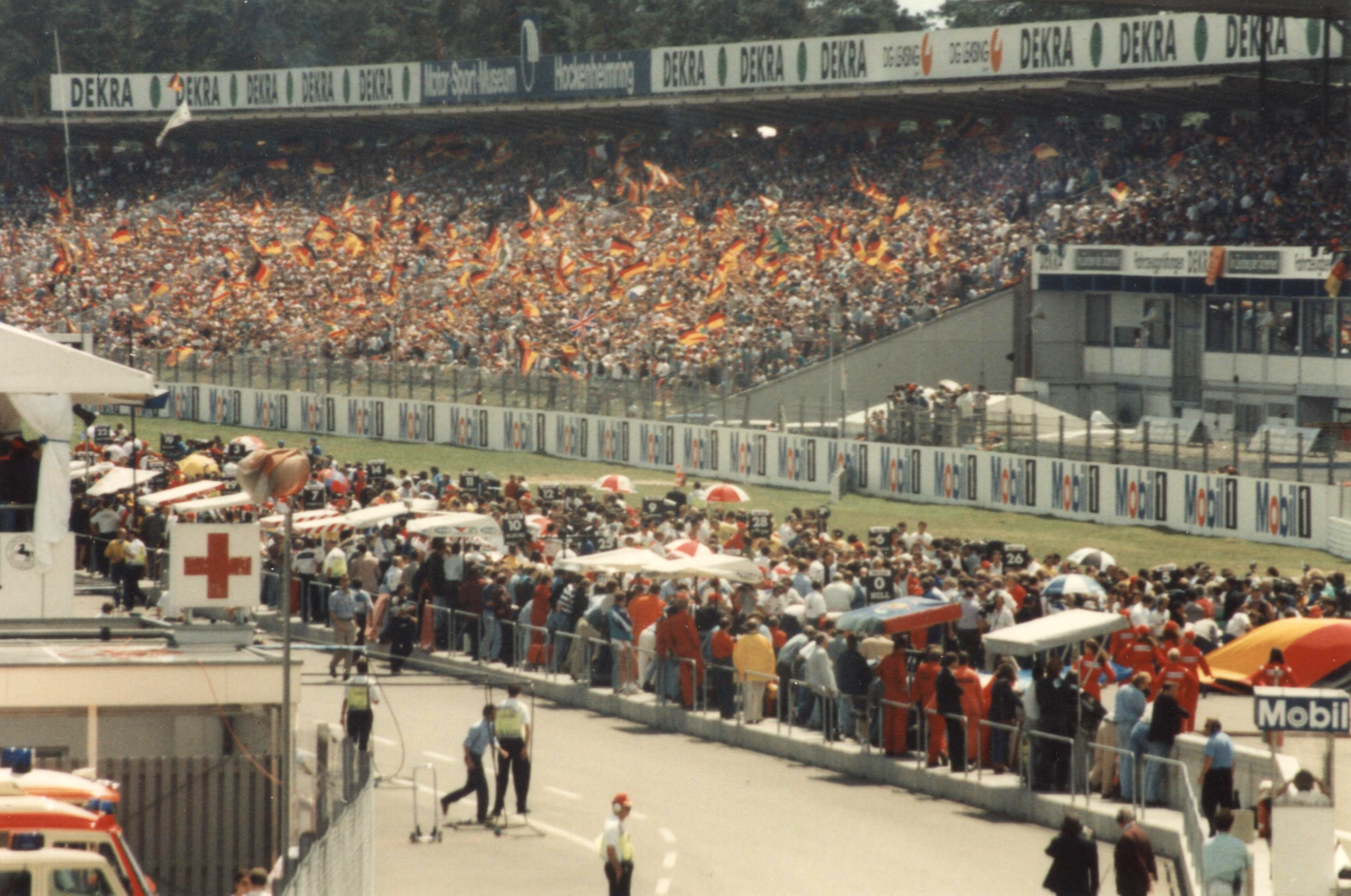
Start grid

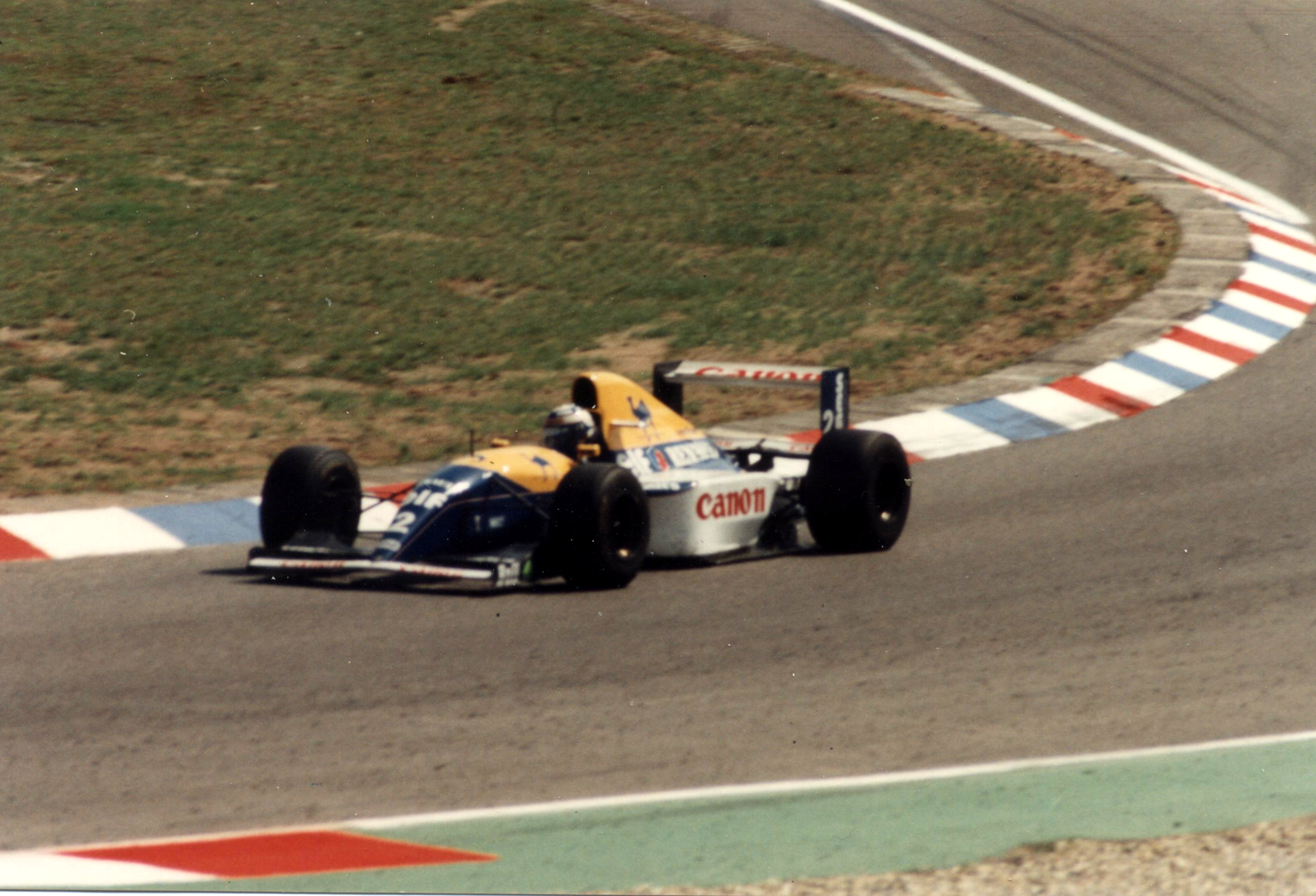
Race winner Alain Prost driving a Williams-Renault FW15C

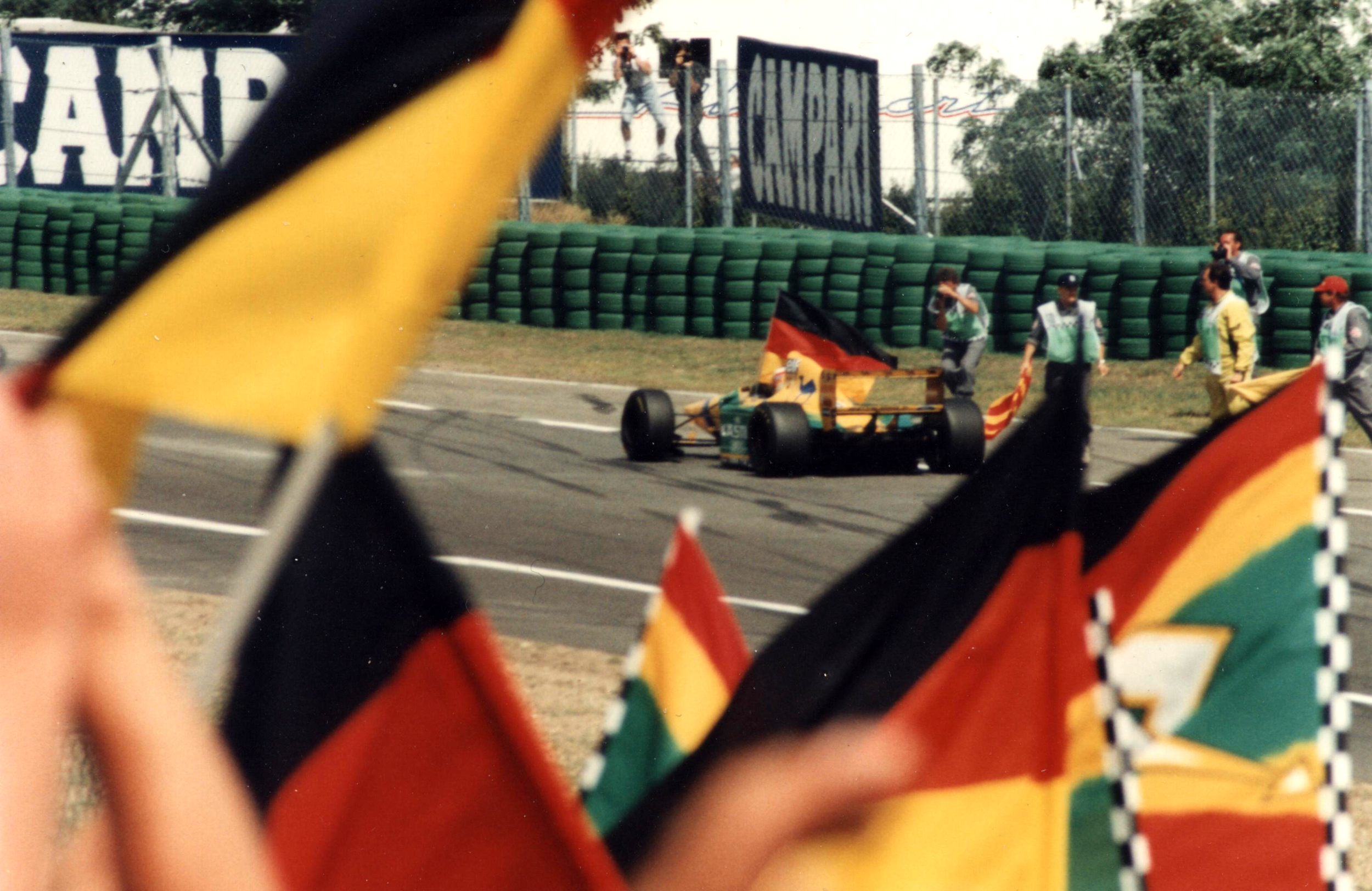
Michael Schumacher after finishing 2nd at his home race

The two Williams were 1st and 2nd in qualifying with Prost on pole ahead of Hill, Schumacher, Senna, Blundell and Brundle. Prost had a poor start and was passed by Hill, Schumacher and Senna. Prost reclaimed third from Senna on the run down to the first chicane, which they entered side by side. Exiting the chicane, Senna spun and had to wait for the entire field to pass by before he could rejoin. Fourth placed Brundle then spun as well at the second chicane forcing Prost to take evasive action and bypass part of the track. Both would serve 10-second stop-and-go penalties for this later in the race. At the end of the first lap, Hill led Schumacher, Prost, Brundle, Blundell, Patrese, Berger and Alesi.

Prost was on a charge, passing Schumacher on lap 6. He closed up on Hill three laps later. Behind, on the next lap, Berger tried to pass Suzuki and they collided, with Suzuki spinning off. Yellow flags were waved and Hill slowed down a little on the next lap. Prost took his chance and passed Hill to lead. He then served his controversial stop-go penalty (which he called a scandal in the press conference later that day) on the next lap and dropped to sixth behind Patrese.

Schumacher was the first of the leaders to pit for tyres, resuming in fourth place, behind Prost and Blundell and just in front of teammate Patrese. He then passed Blundell for third in the first chicane on the next lap, Brundle having dropped back to midfield due to serving his stop-go penalty on lap 12. Senna had worked his way up to seventh but was unable to pass Berger's Ferrari, eventually choosing to pit for tyres, as did first Patrese and Blundell, leaving the order midway through the race: Hill, Prost, Schumacher, Berger, Blundell, Patrese and Senna, neither Williams choosing to come in for tyres in this race. Blundell on new tyres was able to pass Berger for fourth only for the Austrian to repass him on the next straight with some fierce slipstreaming. Blundell eventually passed Berger for good coming into the stadium section, with Patrese and Senna both closing rapidly on the Austrian. Senna gained fifth place, passing both Patrese and Berger on the following lap, with Patrese also able to slipstream past the Ferrari, which was suffering increasingly on its aging tyres. Schumacher then stopped for a third set of tyres dropping him further behind the two Williams cars while still half a minute clear of Blundell in fourth position, who preserved a slight gap to Senna's McLaren in fifth.

In the closing laps Prost closed on Hill, while Schumacher set a string of fastest lap times to close to within 17s of Prost. Senna - still unable to pass Blundell - came in for an unscheduled tyre stop on lap 41, rejoining safely in front of Patrese. Hill's lead was reduced to 8 seconds by the penultimate lap but appeared to be cruising to victory until, coming out of the Ostkurve, his left rear tyre deflated, Hill having to retire his car before reaching the pits. Instead of Hill taking his first victory, Prost took what was to be his 51st and final win in front of a typically delighted Schumacher followed by Blundell, Senna, Patrese and Berger.

== Classification ==
=== Qualifying ===
Pos	No	Driver	Constructor	Q1	Q2	Gap
1	2	(France) Alain Prost	Williams-Renault	1:39.046	1:38.748	
2	0	(United Kingdom) Damon Hill	Williams-Renault	1:40.211	1:38.905	+0.157
3	5	(Germany) Michael Schumacher	Benetton-Ford	1:39.640	1:39.580	+0.832
4	8	(Brazil) Ayrton Senna	McLaren-Ford	1:40.642	1:39.616	+0.868
5	26	(United Kingdom) Mark Blundell	Ligier-Renault	1:40.279	1:40.135	+1.387
6	25	(United Kingdom) Martin Brundle	Ligier-Renault	1:40.916	1:40.855	+2.107
7	6	(Italy) Riccardo Patrese	Benetton-Ford	1:41.101	1:41.292	+2.353
8	10	(Japan) Aguri Suzuki	Footwork-Mugen-Honda	1:41.138	1:41.220	+2.390
9	28	(Austria) Gerhard Berger	Ferrari	1:41.290	1:41.242	+2.494
10	27	(France) Jean Alesi	Ferrari	1:41.304	1:41.726	+2.556
11	9	(United Kingdom) Derek Warwick	Footwork-Mugen-Honda	1:42.977	1:41.449	+2.701
12	7	(United States) Michael Andretti	McLaren-Ford	1:41.531	1:42.468	+2.783
13	12	(United Kingdom) Johnny Herbert	Lotus-Ford	1:41.564	1:42.970	+2.816
14	29	(Austria) Karl Wendlinger	Sauber	1:41.922	1:41.642	+2.894
15	11	(Italy) Alessandro Zanardi	Lotus-Ford	1:41.858	1:43.561	+3.110
16	20	(France) Érik Comas	Larrousse-Lamborghini	1:42.086	1:41.945	+3.197
17	14	(Brazil) Rubens Barrichello	Jordan-Hart	1:42.152	1:42.025	+3.277
18	30	(Finland) JJ Lehto	Sauber	1:42.845	1:42.032	+3.284
19	4	(Italy) Andrea de Cesaris	Tyrrell-Yamaha	1:43.471	1:42.203	+3.455
20	23	(Brazil) Christian Fittipaldi	Minardi-Ford	1:42.658	1:44.058	+3.910
21	3	(Japan) Ukyo Katayama	Tyrrell-Yamaha	1:46.709	1:42.682	+3.934
22	24	(Italy) Pierluigi Martini	Minardi-Ford	1:42.786	1:43.353	+4.038
23	19	(France) Philippe Alliot	Larrousse-Lamborghini	1:42.912	1:42.910	+4.162
24	15	(Belgium) Thierry Boutsen	Jordan-Hart	1:43.476	1:43.007	+4.259
25	22	(Italy) Luca Badoer	Lola-Ferrari	1:43.345	1:44.641	+4.597
26	21	(Italy) Michele Alboreto	Lola-Ferrari	1:44.198	1:44.166	+5.418

=== Race ===
Pos	No	Driver	Constructor	Laps	Time/Retired	Grid	Points
1	2	(France) Alain Prost	Williams-Renault	45	1:18:40.885	1	10
2	5	(Germany) Michael Schumacher	Benetton-Ford	45	+ 16.664	3	6
3	26	(United Kingdom) Mark Blundell	Ligier-Renault	45	+ 59.349	5	4
4	8	(Brazil) Ayrton Senna	McLaren-Ford	45	+ 1:08.229	4	3
5	6	(Italy) Riccardo Patrese	Benetton-Ford	45	+ 1:31.516	7	2
6	28	(Austria) Gerhard Berger	Ferrari	45	+ 1:34.754	9	1
7	27	(France) Jean Alesi	Ferrari	45	+ 1:35.841	10	
8	25	(United Kingdom) Martin Brundle	Ligier-Renault	44	+ 1 lap	6	
9	29	(Austria) Karl Wendlinger	Sauber	44	+ 1 lap	14	
10	12	(United Kingdom) Johnny Herbert	Lotus-Ford	44	+ 1 lap	13	
11	23	(Brazil) Christian Fittipaldi	Minardi-Ford	44	+ 1 lap	20	
12	19	(France) Philippe Alliot	Larrousse-Lamborghini	44	+ 1 lap	23	
13	15	(Belgium) Thierry Boutsen	Jordan-Hart	44	+ 1 lap	24	
14	24	(Italy) Pierluigi Martini	Minardi-Ford	44	+ 1 lap	22	
15	0	(United Kingdom) Damon Hill	Williams-Renault	43	Tyre	2	
16	21	(Italy) Michele Alboreto	Lola-Ferrari	43	+ 2 laps	26	
17	9	(United Kingdom) Derek Warwick	Footwork-Mugen-Honda	42	+ 3 laps	11	
Ret	14	(Brazil) Rubens Barrichello	Jordan-Hart	34	Wheel bearing	17	
Ret	3	(Japan) Ukyo Katayama	Tyrrell-Yamaha	28	Halfshaft	21	
Ret	30	(Finland) JJ Lehto	Sauber	22	Spun off	18	
Ret	11	(Italy) Alessandro Zanardi	Lotus-Ford	19	Spun off	15	
Ret	10	(Japan) Aguri Suzuki	Footwork-Mugen-Honda	9	Collision	8	
Ret	7	(United States) Michael Andretti	McLaren-Ford	4	Collision	12	
Ret	22	(Italy) Luca Badoer	Lola-Ferrari	4	Suspension	25	
Ret	4	(Italy) Andrea de Cesaris	Tyrrell-Yamaha	1	Gearbox	19	
Ret	20	(France) Érik Comas	Larrousse-Lamborghini	0	Gearbox	16	

- Alain Prost and Martin Brundle both received a ten-second time penalty for leaving the track and gaining an advantage.

== Championship standings after the race ==
Drivers' Championship standings

	Pos	Driver	Points
	1	(France) Alain Prost	77
	2	(Brazil) Ayrton Senna	50
	3	(Germany) Michael Schumacher	36
	4	(United Kingdom) Damon Hill	28
1	5	(Italy) Riccardo Patrese	11

Constructors' Championship standings

	Pos	Constructor	Points
	1	(United Kingdom) Williams-Renault	105
	2	(United Kingdom) McLaren-Ford	53
	3	(United Kingdom) Benetton-Ford	47
	4	(France) Ligier-Renault	19
1	5	(Italy) Ferrari	10

- Note: Only the top five positions are included for both sets of standings.

Previous race: 1993 British Grand Prix	FIA Formula One World Championship; 1993 season	Next race: 1993 Hungarian Grand Prix
Previous race: 1992 German Grand Prix	German Grand Prix	Next race: 1994 German Grand Prix
