= 2011 Volkswagen Scirocco R-Cup =

Seasons
- ← 2010 2012 →

The 2011 Volkswagen Scirocco R-Cup season was the second Volkswagen Scirocco R-Cup season, the replacement for the ADAC Volkswagen Polo Cup. It began on 30 April at the Hockenheimring and concluded at the same venue on 22 October, after eight race weekends and a total of ten races.

== Drivers ==
- All cars are powered by Volkswagen engines and use Volkswagen Scirocco chassis.

No.	Driver	Class	Rounds
2	(Germany) Nino Müller	J	All
3	(Denmark) Maiken Rasmussen	J	All
4	(United States) Dennis Trebing	J	All
5	(Germany) Jonas Giesler	J	All
6	(Switzerland) Fabian Danz	J	All
7	(Germany) Moritz Oestreich	J	All
8	(Poland) Mateusz Lisowski	P	All
9	(Luxembourg) Daniel Bohr	J	All
10	(Germany) Nicolas Schneider	J	All
11	(United Kingdom) Daniel Lloyd	J	All
12	(Germany) Thomas Schöffler	J	All
14	(India) Aditya Patel	P	All
15	(Turkey) Berke Bayındır	P	All
16	(Germany) Jann-Hendrik Ubben	P	All
17	(United States) J. D. Mobley	P	All
18	(Germany) Michael Müller	P	All
19	(Poland) Adam Gładysz	P	All
20	(India) Sailesh Bolisetti	P	All
21	(Italy) Stefano Proetto	P	All
22	(Germany) Eve Scheer	P	All
23	(Sweden) Ola Nilsson	P	All
24	(Denmark) Kurt Thiim	L	1
25	(Germany) Klaus Niedzwiedz	L	1
26	(Italy) Nicola Larini	L	1
27	(Venezuela) Johnny Cecotto	L	1
28	(Germany) Uwe Alzen	L	1
29	(Germany) Sven Hannawald	L	2
30	(Austria) Michael Walchhofer	L	2
31	(Austria) Hans Knauß	L	2
32	(Austria) Thomas Morgenstern	L	2
34	(Czech Republic) Jakub Rejlek	L	2
35	(Austria) Xaver Hiebner	L	2
36	(Germany) Dirk Raudies	L	3
37	(Germany) Max Neukirchner	L	3
38	(Germany) Ralf Waldmann	L	3
40	(Spain) Aleix Espargaró	L	3
41	(Germany) Edgar Mielke	L	3
42	(Germany) Willi Balz	L	3
43	(Germany) Frank Biela	L	4
44	(Denmark) John Nielsen	L	4
45	(Netherlands) Jan Lammers	L	4
46	(Belgium) Marc Duez	L	4
47	(Germany) Uwe Nittel	L	5
48	(Germany) Niki Schelle	L	5
50	(Germany) Christian Riedemann	L	5
51	(Netherlands) Hans Weijs	L	5
52	(Germany) Axel Stein	G	5
71	(Germany) Axel Stein	G	8
53	(Germany) Matthias Malmedie	G	5
54	(United Kingdom) Johnny Herbert	L	6
55	(United Kingdom) Mark Blundell	L	6
56	(United Kingdom) Tiff Needell	L	6
57	(United Kingdom) Mark Higgins	L	6
59	(United Kingdom) Owen Mildenhall	G	6
60	(United Kingdom) Anthony Hamilton	G	6
61	(United Kingdom) Nicolas Hamilton	G	6
62	(Germany) Andreas Ahn	L	7
63	(Germany) Jacques Schulz	L	7
64	(Germany) Philipp Sohmer	L	7
65	(Germany) Daniel la Rosa	L	7
66	(Netherlands) Arie Luyendyk	L	8
67	(Austria) Mathias Lauda	L	8
68	(Finland) Juha Kankkunen	L	8
69	(France) Patrick Tambay	L	8
72	(Germany) Christoph Kragenings	G	8

Icon	Class
G	Guest
J	Junior Cup
L	Legend Cup
P	Pro Cup

== Race calendar and results ==
Round		Circuit	Date	Pole position	Fastest lap	Winning driver
1	R	(Germany) Hockenheimring	30 April	(United Kingdom) Daniel Lloyd	(Italy) Nicola Larini	(Poland) Mateusz Lisowski
2	R1	(Austria) Red Bull Ring	4 June	(Poland) Mateusz Lisowski	(United Kingdom) Daniel Lloyd	(Poland) Mateusz Lisowski
2	R2	(Austria) Red Bull Ring	5 June		(Italy) Stefano Proetto	(Italy) Stefano Proetto
3	R	(Germany) Lausitzring	18 June	(United States) J. D. Mobley	(United Kingdom) Daniel Lloyd	(United Kingdom) Daniel Lloyd
4	R	(Germany) Norisring	2 July	(Sweden) Ola Nilsson	(Italy) Stefano Proetto	(Sweden) Ola Nilsson
5	R	(Germany) Nürburgring	6 August	(Poland) Mateusz Lisowski	(Poland) Mateusz Lisowski	(Poland) Mateusz Lisowski
6	R	(United Kingdom) Brands Hatch	3 September	(Germany) Jann-Hendrik Ubben	(Sweden) Ola Nilsson	(Sweden) Ola Nilsson
7	R1	(Germany) Motorsport Arena Oschersleben	17 September	(Poland) Mateusz Lisowski	(Poland) Mateusz Lisowski	(Poland) Mateusz Lisowski
7	R2	(Germany) Motorsport Arena Oschersleben	18 September		(Sweden) Ola Nilsson	(India) Aditya Patel
8	R	(Germany) Hockenheimring	22 October	(Poland) Mateusz Lisowski	(India) Aditya Patel	(United Kingdom) Daniel Lloyd

== Championship standings ==
Scoring system

Position	1st	2nd	3rd	4th	5th	6th	7th	8th	9th	10th	11th	12th	13th	14th	15th	16th	17th	18th	19th	20th
Points	60	48	40	34	32	30	28	26	24	22	20	18	16	14	12	10	8	6	4	2

- In order to not disadvantage new drivers to the series, half-points are awarded at the opening two races of the season.

=== Drivers' Championship ===
Pos	Driver	HOC (Germany)	RBR (Austria)		LAU (Germany)	NOR (Germany)	NÜR (Germany)	BRH (United Kingdom)	OSC (Germany)		HOC (Germany)	Points
1	(Poland) Mateusz Lisowski	1	**1**	2	3	3	**1**	3	**1**	3	**7**	416
2	(Sweden) Ola Nilsson	6	3	9	5	**1**	4	1	4	4	3	355
3	(United Kingdom) Daniel Lloyd	**2**	10	8	1	4	2	8	6	5	1	351
4	(Italy) Stefano Proetto	10	8	1	8	2	8	7	2	6	5	326
5	(India) Aditya Patel	4	11	4	4	5	3	6	9	1	6	319
6	(Germany) Moritz Oestreich	12	4	10	12	11	7	4	5	2	4	275
7	(Poland) Adam Gładysz	8	5	6	6	6	5	11	17	12	10	225
8	(Germany) Jann-Hendrik Ubben	Ret	Ret	11	7	12	9	**2**	3	9	14	222
9	(United States) Dennis Trebing	14	6	3	21	18	18	18	11	10	2	197
10	(United States) J. D. Mobley	7	2	5	**2**	Ret	11	17	Ret	Ret	11	172
11	(Germany) Nicolas Schneider	17	20	12	14	16	14	10	12	7	12	172
12	(Luxembourg) Daniel Bohr	21	17	13	15	13	15	9	13	13	18	150
13	(Germany) Jonas Giesler	22	Ret	16	9	20	10	12	15	16	8	136
14	(Germany) Thomas Schöffler	11	7	7	24	8	6	Ret	16	Ret	Ret	125
15	(India) Sailesh Bolisetti	13	13	14	13	14	16	14	19	18	13	110
16	(Turkey) Berke Bayındır	19	Ret	25	20	15	12	24	8	11	Ret	103
17	(Denmark) Maiken Rasmussen	9	Ret	17	18	19	Ret	DNS	14	8	17	94
18	(Switzerland) Fabian Danz	20	12	19	17	23	Ret	21	18	14	9	94
19	(Germany) Eve Scheer	23	9	15	22	15	Ret	15	Ret	15	16	89
20	(Germany) Nino Müller	Ret	21	22	19	Ret	20	13	10	19	15	86
21	(Germany) Michael Müller	24	18	24	Ret	21	24	23	20	17	20	46
guest drivers ineligible for championship points
—	(Italy) Nicola Larini	3										0
—	(Germany) Uwe Alzen	5										0
—	(United Kingdom) Johnny Herbert							5				0
—	(Germany) Daniel la Rosa								7	DNS		0
—	(Denmark) John Nielsen					7						0
—	(Germany) Frank Biela					9						0
—	(Austria) Hans Knauß		10	Ret								0
—	(Germany) Ralf Waldmann				10							0
—	(Netherlands) Jan Lammers					10						0
—	(Venezuela) Johnny Cecotto	11										0
—	(Spain) Aleix Espargaró				11							0
—	(United Kingdom) Tiff Needell							12				0
—	(Germany) Max Neukirchner				13							0
—	(Germany) Uwe Nittel						13					0
—	(Austria) Xaver Hiebner		14	23								0
—	(Germany) Christian Riedemann						14					0
—	(Germany) Klaus Niedzwiedz	15										0
—	(Czech Republic) Jakub Rejlek		16	DNS								0
—	(Denmark) Kurt Thiim	16										0
—	(Netherlands) Hans Weijs						17					0
—	(Germany) Sven Hannawald		Ret	18								0
—	(Austria) Michael Walchhofer		19	21								0
—	(United Kingdom) Mark Higgins							19				0
—	(Finland) Juha Kankkunen										19	0
—	(Austria) Thomas Morgenstern		Ret	20								0
—	(Germany) Andreas Ahn								20	DNS		0
—	(United Kingdom) Owen Mildenhall							20				0
—	(Germany) Niki Schelle						21					0
—	(Germany) Christoph Kragenings										21	0
—	(Germany) Axel Stein						22				23	0
—	(Belgium) Marc Duez					22						0
—	(United Kingdom) Mark Blundell							22				0
—	(Netherlands) Arie Luyendyk										22	0
—	(Germany) Dirk Raudies				23							0
—	(Germany) Matthias Malmedie						23					0
—	(France) Patrick Tambay										24	0
—	(Germany) Philipp Sohmer								Ret	DNS		0
—	(Germany) Edgar Mielke				Ret							0
—	(Austria) Mathias Lauda										Ret	0
—	(Germany) Jacques Schulz								DNS	DNS		0
—	(Germany) Willi Balz				DNS							0
—	(United Kingdom) Anthony Hamilton							DNS				0
—	(United Kingdom) Nicolas Hamilton							DNS				0
Pos	Driver	HOC (Germany)	RBR (Austria)		LAU (Germany)	NOR (Germany)	NÜR (Germany)	BRH (United Kingdom)	OSC (Germany)		HOC (Germany)	Points

Colour	Result
Gold	Winner
Silver	Second place
Bronze	Third place
Green	Points classification
Blue	Non-points classification
Blue	Non-classified finish (NC)
Purple	Retired, not classified (Ret)
Red	Did not qualify (DNQ)
Red	Did not pre-qualify (DNPQ)
Black	Disqualified (DSQ)
White	Did not start (DNS)
White	Withdrew (WD)
White	Race cancelled (C)
Blank	Did not practice (DNP)
Blank	Did not arrive (DNA)
Blank	Excluded (EX)

**Bold** – Pole
Italics – Fastest Lap

=== Junior Cup ===
Pos	Driver	HOC (Germany)	RBR (Austria)		LAU (Germany)	NOR (Germany)	NÜR (Germany)	BRH (United Kingdom)	OSC (Germany)		HOC (Germany)	Points
1	(Germany) Moritz Oestreich	12	4	10	12	11	7	4	5	2	4	466
2	(United States) Dennis Trebing	14	6	3	21	18	18	18	11	10	2	353
3	(Germany) Nicolas Schneider	17	20	12	14	16	16	10	12	7	12	325
4	(Luxembourg) Daniel Bohr	21	17	13	15	13	15	9	13	13	18	308
5	(Germany) Jonas Giesler	22	Ret	16	9	20	10	14	15	16	8	299
6	(Germany) Thomas Schöffler	13	7	7	24	8	6	Ret	16	Ret	Ret	258
7	(Germany) Nino Müller	Ret	21	22	19	Ret	20	13	10	19	15	232
8	(Switzerland) Fabian Danz	20	12	19	17	23	Ret	21	18	14	9	232
9	(Denmark) Maiken Rasmussen	9	Ret	17	18	19	Ret	Ret	14	8	17	216
Pos	Driver	HOC (Germany)	RBR (Austria)		LAU (Germany)	NOR (Germany)	NÜR (Germany)	BRH (United Kingdom)	OSC (Germany)		HOC (Germany)	Points
