= 2010 Volkswagen Scirocco R-Cup =

Seasons
- ← 2009 2011 →

The 2010 Volkswagen Scirocco R-Cup was the first Volkswagen Scirocco R-Cup season, the replacement for the ADAC Volkswagen Polo Cup. It began on April 24 at the Hockenheimring and ended again at the Hockenheimring on October 16, after seven race weekends and a total of nine races.

== Drivers ==
- All cars are powered by Volkswagen engines and use Volkswagen Scirocco chassis.

No	Driver	Class	Rounds
2	(Germany) Jann-Hendrik Ubben	J	All
3	(Germany) Sönke Schmidt	J	1
4	(Germany) Kris Heidorn	J	All
5	(Germany) Arne Larisch	J	All
6	(Germany) Dennis Rieger	J	All
7	(Czech Republic) Isabelle Biela	J	All
8	(Germany) Christian Schweiger	J	1–4, 6–7
9	(Germany) Daniel Bohr	J	All
10	(Germany) Nicolas Schneider	J	All
11	(Germany) Philipp Glauner	J	1–3
12	(Sweden) Ola Nilsson	J	All
14	(India) Aditya Patel	P	All
15	(Turkey) Berke Bayındır	P	All
16	(Germany) Peter Schleifer	P	All
17	(United States) Timmy Megenbier	P	All
18	(Germany) Felix Tigges	P	All
19	(Poland) Adam Gładysz	P	All
20	(Poland) Maciek Steinhof	P	All
21	(Italy) Stefano Proetto	P	All
22	(Germany) Eve Scheer	P	All
24	(United Kingdom) Martin Brundle	L	1
52	(United Kingdom) Martin Brundle	L	5
25	(Spain) Carlos Sainz	L	1
26	(France) Jacques Laffite	L	1
27	(Germany) Frank Biela	L	1, 6
28	(Germany) Harald Grohs	L	2
44	(Germany) Harald Grohs	L	4
29	(Germany) Klaus Niedzwiedz	L	2
30	(Denmark) Kurt Thiim	L	2
31	(Netherlands) Jan Lammers	L	2
32	(Sweden) Slim Borgudd	L	2
33	(Germany) Martin Westerhoff	G	2
34	(Germany) Christian Gebhardt	G	2
35	(Germany) Christian Abt	L	3
36	(Switzerland) Marc Surer	L	3
37	(Poland) Krzysztof Hołowczyc	L	3
38	(Germany) Bertram Schäfer	L	3
39	(Germany) Ralf Kelleners	L	3
40	(Germany) Miriam Höller	G	3
41	(Germany) Altfrid Heger	L	4
42	(Germany) Sabine Schmitz	L	4
43	(Germany) Olaf Manthey	L	4
45	(Germany) Uwe Alzen	L	4
46	(Germany) Axel Stein	G	4
47	(Switzerland) Rahel Frey	G	4
48	(Germany) Johannes Stuck	G	4
49	(Germany) Edgar Mielke	G	4
50	(United Kingdom) Derek Bell	L	5
51	(United Kingdom) Johnny Herbert	L	5, 7
54	(United Kingdom) Mark Blundell	L	5
55	(United Kingdom) John Barker	G	5
56	(United Kingdom) Adam Hay-Nicholls	G	5
57	(United States) Andy Lee	P	5
58	(Germany) Marco Werner	L	6
59	(Australia) David Brabham	L	6
60	(Germany) René Rast	G	6
61	(France) Cyril Despres	L	6
62	(Germany) Michael Hess	P	6–7
63	(Germany) Dieter Serowy	G	6
64	(South Africa) Mathew Hodges	G	6
65	(Germany) Jörg Janzen	G	6
66	(South Africa) Giniel de Villiers	L	7
67	(Finland) Juha Kankkunen	L	7
69	(Germany) Willi Bergmeister	L	7
70	(Germany) Mario Kotaska	G	7
71	(Japan) Osarnu Hatakenaka	G	7
72	(Germany) Daniel la Rosa	G	7
73	(United States) J. D. Mobley	G	7
74	(Germany) Frank Schneider	G	7
75	(United States) Dennis Trebing	G	7

Icon	Class
G	Guest
J	Junior Cup
L	Legend Cup
P	Pro Cup

== Race calendar and results ==
Round		Circuit	Date	Pole position	Fastest lap	Winning driver
1	R	(Germany) Hockenheimring	April 24	(Germany) Kris Heidorn	(Germany) Kris Heidorn	(Poland) Maciek Steinhof
2	R	(Germany) EuroSpeedway Lausitz	June 5	(Poland) Maciek Steinhof	(Germany) Kris Heidorn	(Poland) Maciek Steinhof
3	R	(Germany) Norisring	July 3	(Poland) Krzysztof Hołowczyc	(Italy) Stefano Proetto	(Italy) Stefano Proetto
4	R1	(Germany) Nürburgring	August 7	(India) Aditya Patel	(Germany) Uwe Alzen	(India) Aditya Patel
4	R2	(Germany) Nürburgring	August 8		(Switzerland) Rahel Frey	(Germany) Arne Larisch
5	R	(United Kingdom) Brands Hatch	September 4	(Germany) Kris Heidorn	(United Kingdom) Mark Blundell	(Germany) Kris Heidorn
6	R1	(Germany) Motorsport Arena Oschersleben	September 18	(Germany) René Rast	(Germany) René Rast	(Germany) René Rast
6	R2	(Germany) Motorsport Arena Oschersleben	September 19		(Germany) Jann-Hendrik Ubben	(Germany) René Rast
7	R	(Germany) Hockenheimring	October 16	(United Kingdom) Johnny Herbert	(Germany) Daniel la Rosa	(Germany) Daniel la Rosa

== Championship standings ==
Pos	Driver	HOC (Germany)	LAU (Germany)	NOR (Germany)	NÜR (Germany)		BRH (United Kingdom)	OSC (Germany)		HOC (Germany)	Points
1	(Germany) Kris Heidorn	**2**	2	7	4	9	**1**	2	10	4	356
2	(Germany) Jann-Hendrik Ubben	9	19	5	5	2	2	6	2	13	301
3	(Poland) Maciek Steinhof	1	**1**	2	2	Ret	4	3	7	Ret	276
4	(Germany) Arne Larisch	13	5	11	6	1	15	13	13	12	243
5	(Italy) Stefano Proetto	10	Ret	1	12	16	8	4	6	20	229
6	(Sweden) Ola Nilsson	4	4	8	Ret	Ret	9	9	4	5	223
7	(Poland) Adam Gładysz	5	10	Ret	8	3	12	14	14	7	202
8	(United States) Timmy Megenbier	8	6	14	13	15	10	16	12	8	196
9	(Germany) Felix Tigges	16	12	21	10	Ret	13	5	5	6	192
10	(Turkey) Berke Bayındır	14	14	19	11	8	16	15	8	11	186
11	(Germany) Dennis Rieger	11	3	12	21	10	6	18	15	17	184
12	(India) Aditya Patel	6	7	13	**1**	4	Ret	Ret	17	25	170
13	(Germany) Daniel Bohr	22	21	20	14	12	20	11	20	16	133
14	(Germany) Christian Schweiger	18	23	3	Ret	13		17	16	14	131
15	(Germany) Nicolas Schneider	20	Ret	22	16	7	17	22	19	10	131
16	(Germany) Eve Scheer	19	18	16	7	DSQ	19	19	21	18	114
17	(Czech Republic) Isabelle Biela	Ret	13	15	Ret	14	18	21	22	23	93
18	(Germany) Peter Schleifer	23	22	24	18	19	23	26	27	21	69
19	(Germany) Philipp Glauner	21	16	18							29
20	(Germany) Michael Hess							25	25	19	28
21	(United States) Andy Lee						11				26
22	(Germany) Sönke Schmidt	15									9
guest drivers ineligible for championship points
–	(Germany) René Rast							**1**	1		0
–	(Germany) Daniel la Rosa									1	0
–	(United Kingdom) Johnny Herbert						5			**2**	0
–	(United Kingdom) Martin Brundle	3					7				0
–	(Australia) David Brabham							7	3		0
–	(Germany) Olaf Manthey				3	Ret					0
–	(United Kingdom) Mark Blundell						3				0
–	(United States) J. D. Mobley									3	0
–	(Poland) Krzysztof Hołowczyc			**4**							0
–	(Germany) Uwe Alzen				Ret	5					0
–	(Switzerland) Rahel Frey				20	6					0
–	(Germany) Ralf Kelleners			6							0
–	(Germany) Frank Biela	7						12	9		0
–	(South Africa) Mathew Hodges							8	11		0
–	(Denmark) Kurt Thiim		8								0
–	(Germany) Altfrid Heger				9	Ret					0
–	(Germany) Klaus Niedzwiedz		9								0
–	(Switzerland) Marc Surer			9							0
–	(United States) Dennis Trebing									9	0
–	(Germany) Marco Werner							10	18		0
–	(Germany) Christian Abt			10							0
–	(Germany) Harald Grohs		24		Ret	11					0
–	(Netherlands) Jan Lammers		11								0
–	(Spain) Carlos Sainz	12									0
–	(United Kingdom) John Barker						14				0
–	(Germany) Sabine Schmitz				15	18					0
–	(Sweden) Slim Borgudd		15								0
–	(Finland) Juha Kankkunen									15	0
–	(Germany) Axel Stein				17	17					0
–	(France) Jacques Laffite	17									0
–	(Germany) Christian Gebhardt		17								0
–	(Germany) Bertram Schäfer			17							0
–	(Germany) Edgar Mielke				19	Ret					0
–	(Germany) Dieter Serowy							20	23		0
–	(Germany) Martin Westerhoff		20								0
–	(United Kingdom) Adam Hay-Nicholls						21				0
–	(United Kingdom) Derek Bell						22				0
–	(Germany) Willi Bergmeister									22	0
–	(Germany) Jörg Janzen							23	24		0
–	(Germany) Miriam Höller			23							0
–	(France) Cyril Despres							24	26		0
–	(Japan) Osarnu Hatakenaka									24	0
–	(Germany) Mario Kotaska									27	0
–	(South Africa) Giniel de Villiers									Ret	0
–	(Germany) Johannes Stuck				DNS	DNS					0
Pos	Driver	HOC (Germany)	LAU (Germany)	NOR (Germany)	NÜR (Germany)		BRH (United Kingdom)	OSC (Germany)		HOC (Germany)	Points

Colour	Result
Gold	Winner
Silver	Second place
Bronze	Third place
Green	Points classification
Blue	Non-points classification
Blue	Non-classified finish (NC)
Purple	Retired, not classified (Ret)
Red	Did not qualify (DNQ)
Red	Did not pre-qualify (DNPQ)
Black	Disqualified (DSQ)
White	Did not start (DNS)
White	Withdrew (WD)
White	Race cancelled (C)
Blank	Did not practice (DNP)
Blank	Did not arrive (DNA)
Blank	Excluded (EX)

**Bold** – Pole
Italics – Fastest Lap

Position	1st	2nd	3rd	4th	5th	6th	7th	8th	9th	10th	11th	12th	13th	14th	15th	16th	17th	18th	19th	20th
Points	60	48	40	34	32	30	28	26	24	22	20	18	16	14	12	10	8	6	4	2

- No points are awarded for pole position or fastest race laps. Half-points of the values listed above are awarded for the first two races of the season.
