= Mark Blundell =

British racing driver (born 1966)

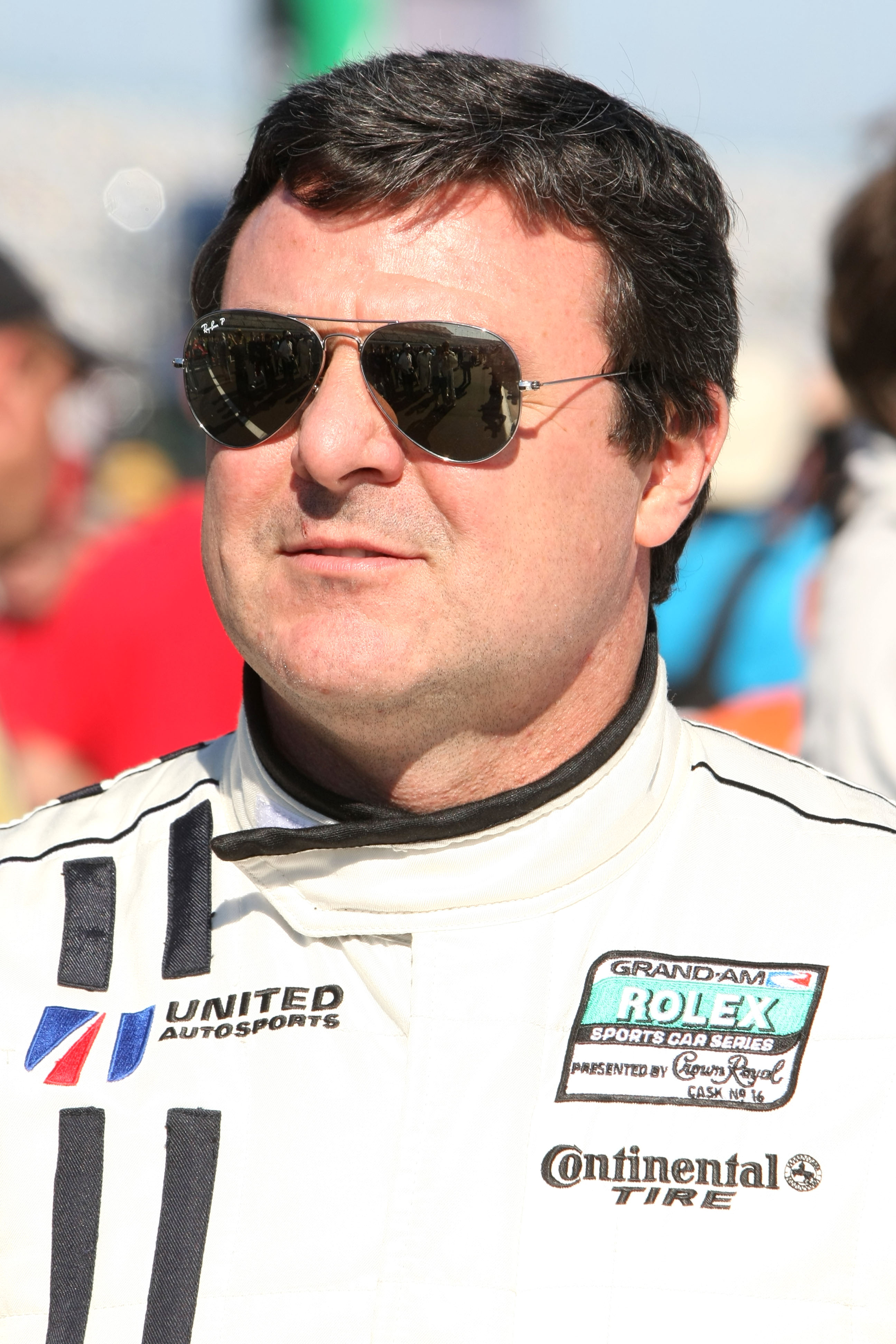
- Blundell in 2011
- Born: 8 April 1966 (age 60); Chipping Barnet, London, England
- Spouse: Deborah (m. 1995)
- Children: 2

Formula One World Championship career
- Nationality: (United Kingdom) British
- Active years: 1991, 1993–1995
- Team(s): Brabham, Ligier, Tyrrell, McLaren
- Entries: 63 (61 starts)
- Championships: 0
- Wins: 0
- Podiums: 3
- Career points: 32
- Pole positions: 0
- Fastest laps: 0
- First entry: 1991 United States Grand Prix
- Last entry: 1995 Australian Grand Prix

Champ Car career
- 81 races run over 5 years
- Team: PacWest
- Best finish: 6th (1997)
- First race: 1996 Grand Prix of Miami (Homestead–Miami)
- Last race: 2000 Marlboro 500 (California)
- First win: 1997 Budweiser/G. I. Joe's 200 (Portland)
- Last win: 1997 Marlboro 500 (California)
Wins	Podiums	Poles
3	5	0

24 Hours of Le Mans career
- Years: 1989–1990, 1992, 1995, 2001–2003
- Teams: Nissan, Peugeot, Gulf, MG, Bentley
- Best finish: 1st (1992)
- Class wins: 1 (1992)

Mark Blundell (born 8 April 1966) is a British former racing driver and broadcaster, who competed in Formula One from 1991 to 1995, and IndyCar from 1996 to 2000. In endurance racing, Blundell won the 24 Hours of Le Mans in 1992 with Peugeot.

Blundell was a Formula One presenter for the British broadcaster ITV until the end of the 2008 season when the TV broadcasting rights switched to the BBC. Blundell returned to the track in 2019, driving in the Kwik Fit British Touring Car Championship for the Trade Price Cars team.

== Background ==
Blundell was born in Barnet, London. He first dabbled in motor sport at the age of 14, racing motocross bikes across England. At the age of 17, he made the switch to four wheels, starting his driving career in Formula Ford. In his first season he placed second in both British Junior Formula Ford Championships. The following year, Blundell won both the Esso British and Snetterton Formula Ford 1600 crowns. The next year, he began racing in the more powerful Formula Ford 2000 category, and won the BBC Grandstand series. He returned to FF1600 to compete in the European Championship racing, taking pole, and finishing fourth overall. In 1986, he won another championship in Formula Ford 2000, this time the European title.

In 1987, Blundell moved on to racing in Formula 3000 and started a number of Formula Three races for TOM'S-Toyota. 1988 brought a switch to the works Lola team in F3000. Blundell completed the season in sixth place.

== Formula One ==
Blundell signed with the sports car team at Nissan for 1989, landing a factory seat. He also managed a test drive with Williams F1 Team. By 1990, Blundell left F3000 to concentrate on sports cars. That same year, he earned pole position at the 24 Hours of Le Mans race driving a Nissan R90CK. Blundell became the youngest driver to achieve pole position at the Le Mans 24 Hours, with a 6.040-second margin ahead of second place.

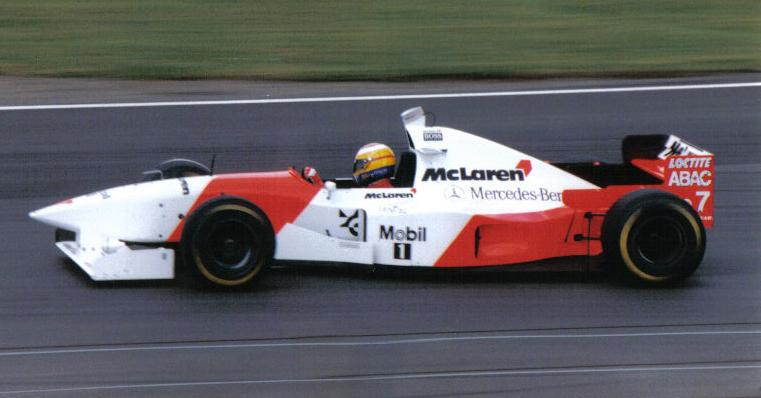
Blundell driving for McLaren at the 1995 British Grand Prix.

1991 marked Blundell's transition into Formula One. His debut season saw a sixth place in Belgium with the Brabham Yamaha team while also maintaining his testing deal with Williams. However, the following season, he was not retained by Brabham, and was left without a race seat in Formula One. He declined Williams' offer to stay on as their test driver for 1992, as he had his eyes solely on a full-time race seat. He told his contemporary Damon Hill about the vacant Williams test seat, which Hill eventually took. Having failed to land a drive for 1992, Blundell eventually signed a testing deal with McLaren. Whilst being a full-time tester for McLaren, he also continued to race sports cars. That year, with the factory Peugeot outfit, he won the Le Mans 24 Hours, adding to his earlier pole.

Blundell returned to Formula One in 1993. A drive with Ligier netted him his first two podium finishes in South Africa and Germany, and tenth in the final World Championship standings. It was a one-year deal with Ligier, however, and in 1994 Blundell signed with Tyrrell. Blundell managed only one podium finish in the 1994 Spanish Grand Prix, which was the last Formula One podium finish for Tyrrell. At the end of the season, owing to lack of sponsorship, Tyrrell released Blundell as the retirement of Nigel Mansell meant a return to McLaren, this time, in a race seat. Teamed with future two-time world champion Mika Häkkinen, Blundell recorded five points finishes and once again took tenth in the final standings. 1995 also saw continued success in sports cars with a fourth place showing in Le Mans, but was Blundell's final year in Formula One, owing to the signing of David Coulthard by McLaren.

Blundell achieved three podiums, and scored a total of 32 championship points.

Blundell came close to making a return to Formula One in 2001. He had advanced negotiations with Prost Grand Prix to be the team's test and development driver but the deal was not concluded.

== CART ==
Mark Blundell

CART World Series
- Years active: 1996–2000
- Teams: PacWest Racing
- Starts: 81
- Wins: 3
- Poles: 0
- Best finish: 6th in 1997

Awards
- 1997: Autosport British Driver of the Year

Out of Formula One, Blundell moved to the United States and joined the CART racing team PacWest, alongside fellow former Formula One driver Maurício Gugelmin. Early in the 1996 season, Blundell crashed head-on into a concrete wall in Rio at an estimated 122 g, resulting in a fractured foot and ankle, brain haematoma, and various injuries to internal organs, forcing him to miss three races. Despite this, he was third in the rookie standings with three top-six finishes in the U.S. 500, Detroit Grand Prix, and Michigan International Speedway races.

In 1997, Blundell came within one corner of winning the Detroit Belle Isle Grand Prix before running out of fuel, an event he described at the time as the worst disappointment of his career. In the next race, he passed Gil de Ferran on the final straight to win the Grand Prix of Portland by 0.027 seconds. Blundell recorded further race victories in Toronto and Fontana en route to sixth in the championship. That year, he was also named British Driver of the Year by Autosport magazine.

A crash whilst testing at Gateway in early 1999 left Blundell to miss eight races in the middle of the 1999 season. He returned to PacWest for a final season in 2000. However, after finishing 21st in the championship with 18 points, he left PacWest racing by mutual agreement.

== From driving to commentating ==
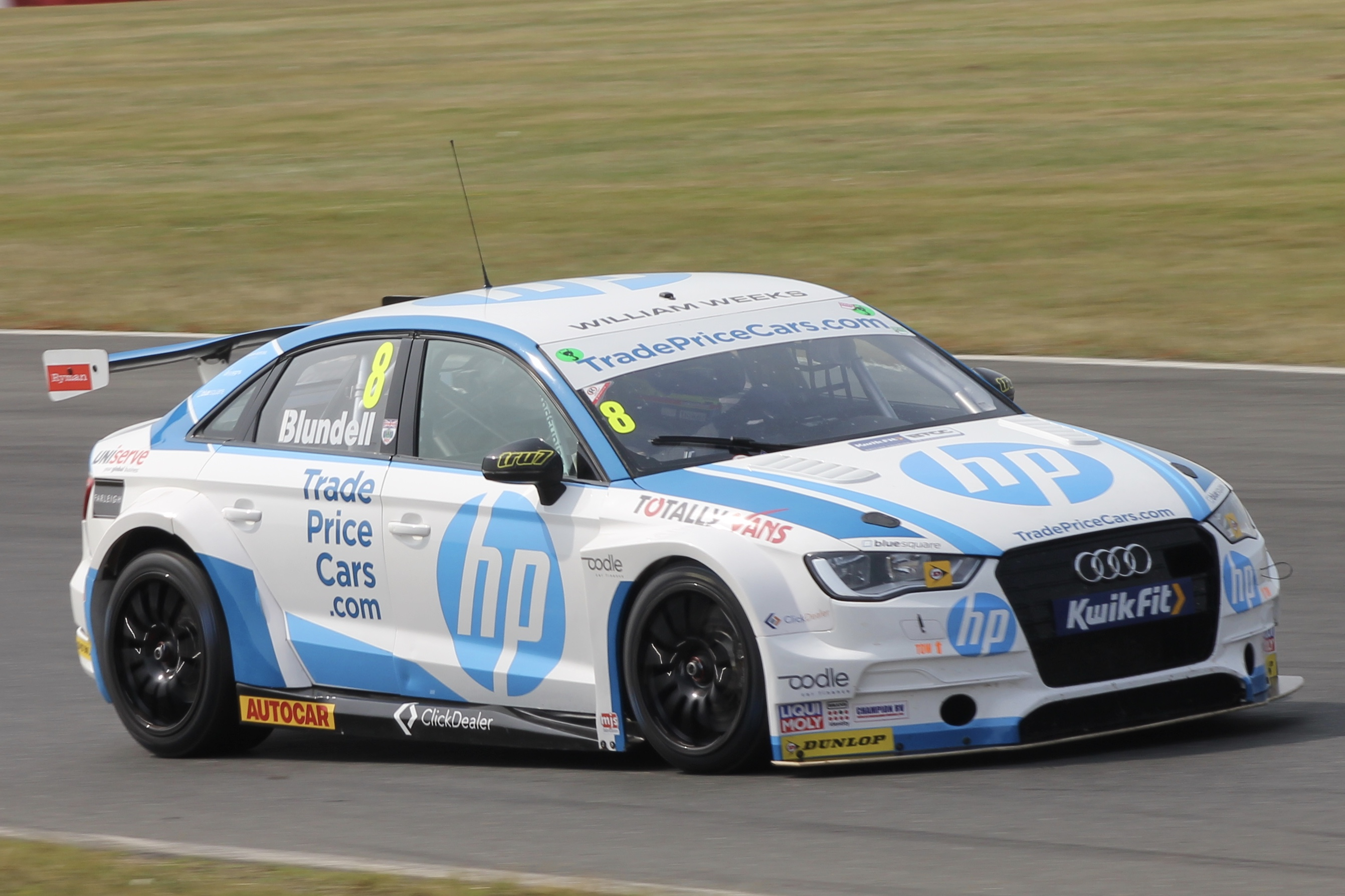
Blundell driving the Trade Price Racing Audi S3 at Snetterton during the 2019 British Touring Car Championship season.

Blundell again crossed the Atlantic to focus on his sports car racing. He failed to finish Le Mans with the MG Lola team, though he and his teammates impressed. Off-track, Blundell joined ITV television in Britain as an analyst for the 2002 Formula One season. This position lasted until the end of the 2008 Formula One season when ITV lost coverage to the BBC.

Since 2001, Blundell's racing involvement has steadily declined, with only the occasional event. He did test a Dale Coyne Champ Car to help prepare Darren Manning for a one-off in the first CART race in Britain at Rockingham, and raced in the British round of the World Rally Championship. In 2003, along with Johnny Herbert and David Brabham, he finished second at the 24 Hours of Le Mans, completing a 1–2 sweep by Bentley. In 2003, he finished third at the 12 Hours of Sebring driving for Bentley alongside Johnny Herbert and David Brabham.

From 2004, Blundell ran a management company, 2MB Sports Management, with fellow ex-F1 driver and friend Martin Brundle, until Brundle decided to devote more time to his television career. The company represent drivers including McLaren test driver Gary Paffett, British Formula 3 champion and IndyCar driver Mike Conway, Ferrari junior Callum Ilott, BMW backed racer Tom Blomqvist, IndyCar driver Jordan King, British F4 champion Kiern Jewiss and British GT driver Patrick Kibble.

== Helmet ==
Blundell's helmet is yellow with three red stripes and two yellow gaps in the middle, a blue stripe in the entire chin area and a blue circle on the top with his golden initials on it. The rear of his helmet bears the motto "The Will To Win" – a quote from his grandfather.

== Personal life ==
Blundell married his wife Deborah in 1995. Ron Dennis loaned him a McLaren F1 for the wedding, which was crashed by his best man Perry McCarthy, who played The Stig on Top Gear. They have two sons: Mark Jr. and Callum. In October 2025, Blundell was given five points on his driving licence and banned from driving for six months for excessive speeding in an incident which took place on 30 November 2024 where Blundell drove his Land Rover at 96 miles per hour in a 70 miles per hour zone.

== Racing record ==
=== Career summary ===
Season	Series	Team	Races	Wins	Poles	F/Laps	Podiums	Points	Position
1984	Formula Ford 2000		?	?	?	?	?	0	?
1985	Formula Ford 1600		?	6	?	?	?	?	**1st**
1985	Formula Ford 2000		?	6	?	?	?	?	?
1985	Formula Ford Festival		1	0	0	?	0	0	4th
1986	Formula Ford 2000		?	?	?	?	?	125	**1st**
1987	British Formula 3 Championship	TOM'S GB	6	0	0	0	1	6	13th
1987	International Formula 3000	Fleetray Racing	5	0	0	0	1	5	15th
1987	International Formula 3000	BS Automotive	4	0	0	0	0	5	15th
1988	International Formula 3000	Lola Motorsport	11	0	0	1	3	18	6th
1988	Japanese Formula 3000	Footwork Racing International	1	0	0	0	0	0	NC
1989	International Formula 3000	Middlebridge	8	0	0	0	1	8	11th
1989	World Sportscar Championship	Nissan Motorsports	5	0	0	0	2	27	11th
1989	24 Hours of Le Mans	Nissan Motorsports	1	0	0	0	0	N/A	DNF
1990	World Sportscar Championship	Nissan Motorsports International	8	0	0	0	3	16	11th
1990	24 Hours of Le Mans	Nissan Motorsports International	1	0	1	0	0	N/A	DNF
1991	Formula One	Motor Racing Developments Ltd	14	0	0	0	0	1	18th
1992	24 Hours of Le Mans	Peugeot Talbot Sport	1	1	0	0	1	N/A	**1st**
1993	Formula One	Ligier Gitanes Blondes	16	0	0	0	2	10	10th
1994	Formula One	Tyrrell	16	0	0	0	1	8	12th
1995	Formula One	Marlboro McLaren Mercedes	15	0	0	0	0	13	10th
1995	24 Hours of Le Mans	GTC Gulf Racing	1	0	0	0	1	N/A	4th
1996	PPG Indy Car World Series	PacWest Racing	13	0	0	0	0	41	16th
1997	PPG CART World Series	PacWest Racing	17	3	0	2	5	115	6th
1998	CART FedEx Championship Series	PacWest Racing	19	0	0	0	0	36	18th
1999	CART FedEx Championship Series	PacWest Racing	12	0	0	0	0	9	23rd
2000	CART FedEx Championship Series	PacWest Racing	20	0	0	0	0	18	21st
2001	24 Hours of Le Mans	MG Sport & Racing	1	0	0	0	0	N/A	DNF
2002	24 Hours of Le Mans	MG Sport & Racing	1	0	0	0	0	N/A	DNF
2002	World Rally Championship	MG Sport & Racing	1	0	0	0	0	0	NC
2003	24 Hours of Le Mans	Team Bentley	1	0	0	0	1	N/A	**2nd**
2003	American Le Mans Series	Team Bentley	1	0	0	0	1	19	21st
2010	Volkswagen Scirocco R-Cup	—N/a	1	0	0	1	1	0	NC†
2011	Rolex Sports Car Series	United Autosports w/ Michael Shank Racing	4	0	0	0	0	99	17th
2011	Volkswagen Scirocco R-Cup	—N/a	1	0	0	0	0	0	NC†
2011	24 Hours of Nürburgring - SP8	Volkswagen Motorsport	1	0	0	0	0	N/A	DNF
2012	Blancpain Endurance Series	United Autosports	4	0	0	0	0	0	NC
2012	Volkswagen Scirocco R-Cup	—N/a	1	0	0	0	0	0	NC†
2013	British GT Championship	United Autosports	2	0	0	0	0	0	NC
2017	Mini Challenge UK	United Autosports	3	0	0	0	0	0	NC†
2019	British Touring Car Championship	TradePriceCars.com	30	0	0	0	0	5	27th

^{†} As Blundell was a guest driver, he was ineligible for championship points.

=== Complete International Formula 3000 results ===
(key)

Year	Entrant	1	2	3	4	5	6	7	8	9	10	11	DC	Points
1987	Fleetray Racing	SIL; Ret	VAL; 6	SPA; 2	PAU	DON; 9		BRH; 6	BIR; DNQ				14th	5
1987	BS Automotive						PER; 9			IMO; Ret	BUG; Ret	JAR; 8	14th	5
1988	Lola Motorsport	JER; 2	VAL; 5	PAU; Ret	SIL; 9	MNZ; Ret	PER; Ret	BRH; 3	BIR; Ret	BUG; 7	ZOL; 2	DIJ; Ret	6th	18
1989	Middlebridge	SIL; 3	VAL; Ret	PAU; 6	JER; DNQ	PER; Ret	BRH; Ret	BIR; 5	SPA; DNS	BUG; Ret	DIJ; 6		11th	8

=== Complete Japanese Formula 3000 Championship results ===
(key)

Year	Entrant	1	2	3	4	5	6	7	8	DC	Points
1988	Footwork Racing International	SUZ	FUJ	MIN	SUZ	SUG	FUJ	SUZ	SUZ; Ret	NC	0

=== Complete 24 Hours of Le Mans results ===
Year	Team	Co-Drivers	Car	Class	Laps	Pos.	Class Pos.
1989	(Japan) Nissan Motorsports	(United Kingdom) Julian Bailey (United Kingdom) Martin Donnelly	Nissan R89C	C1	5	DNF	DNF
1990	(Japan) Nissan Motorsports International	(United Kingdom) Julian Bailey (Italy) Gianfranco Brancatelli	Nissan R90CK	C1	142	DNF	DNF
1992	(France) Peugeot Talbot Sport	(United Kingdom) Derek Warwick (France) Yannick Dalmas	Peugeot 905 Evo 1B	C1	352	**1st**	**1st**
1995	(United Kingdom) GTC Gulf Racing	(United Kingdom) Ray Bellm (Brazil) Maurizio Sandro Sala	McLaren F1 GTR	GT1	291	4th	**3rd**
2001	(United Kingdom) MG Sport & Racing Ltd.	(United Kingdom) Julian Bailey (United Kingdom) Kevin McGarrity	MG-Lola EX257	LMP675	92	DNF	DNF
2002	(United Kingdom) MG Sport & Racing Ltd.	(United Kingdom) Julian Bailey (United Kingdom) Kevin McGarrity	MG-Lola EX257	LMP675	219	DNF	DNF
2003	(United Kingdom) Team Bentley	(Australia) David Brabham (United Kingdom) Johnny Herbert	Bentley Speed 8	LMGTP	375	**2nd**	**2nd**

=== Complete Formula One results ===
(key)

Year	Entrant	Chassis	Engine	1	2	3	4	5	6	7	8	9	10	11	12	13	14	15	16	17	WDC	Pts.
1991	Motor Racing Developments Ltd	Brabham BT59Y	Yamaha V12	USA; Ret	BRA; Ret																18th	1
1991	Motor Racing Developments Ltd	Brabham BT60Y	Yamaha V12			SMR; 8	MON; Ret	CAN; DNQ	MEX; Ret	FRA; Ret	GBR; Ret	GER; 12	HUN; Ret	BEL; 6	ITA; 12	POR; Ret	ESP; Ret	JPN; DNPQ	AUS; 17		18th	1
1993	Ligier Gitanes Blondes	Ligier JS39	Renault V10	RSA; 3	BRA; 5	EUR; Ret	SMR; Ret	ESP; 7	MON; Ret	CAN; Ret	FRA; Ret	GBR; 7	GER; 3	HUN; 7	BEL; 11	ITA; Ret	POR; Ret	JPN; 7	AUS; 9		10th	10
1994	Tyrrell	Tyrrell 022	Yamaha V10	BRA; Ret	PAC; Ret	SMR; 9	MON; Ret	ESP; 3	CAN; 10	FRA; 10	GBR; Ret	GER; Ret	HUN; 5	BEL; 5	ITA; Ret	POR; Ret	EUR; 13	JPN; Ret	AUS; Ret		12th	8
1995	Marlboro McLaren Mercedes	McLaren MP4/10	Mercedes V10	BRA; 6	ARG; Ret	SMR	ESP														10th	13
1995	Marlboro McLaren Mercedes	McLaren MP4/10B	Mercedes V10					MON; 5	CAN; Ret	FRA; 11	GBR; 5	GER; Ret	HUN; Ret	BEL; 5	ITA; 4			PAC; 9	JPN; 7	AUS; 4	10th	13
1995	Marlboro McLaren Mercedes	McLaren MP4/10C	Mercedes V10													POR; 9	EUR; Ret				10th	13

=== Complete CART results ===
(key)

Year	Team	No.	Chassis	Engine	1	2	3	4	5	6	7	8	9	10	11	12	13	14	15	16	17	18	19	20	Rank	Points	Ref
1996	PacWest Racing	21	Reynard 96i	Ford XB V8 t	MIA; 17	RIO; 27	SRF; Inj	LBH; Inj	NZR; Inj	500; 5	MIL; 22	DET; 5	POR; 8	CLE; 11	TOR; 11	MIS; 6	MDO; 10	ROA; 20	VAN; 12	LS; 24					16th	41	
1997	PacWest Racing	18	Reynard 97i	Mercedes-Benz IC108D V8 t	MIA; 14	SRF; 8	LBH; 13	NZR; 19	RIO; 8	STL; 24	MIL; 12	DET; 17	POR; 1	CLE; 9	TOR; 1*	MIS; 2	MDO; 26	ROA; 16*	VAN; 7	LS; 2	FON; 1				6th	115	
1998	PacWest Racing	18	Reynard 97i	Mercedes-Benz IC108D V8 t	MIA; 12	MOT; 10	LBH; 7																		18th	36	
1998	PacWest Racing	18	Reynard 98i	Mercedes-Benz IC108E V8 t				NZR; 20	RIO; 11	STL; 10	MIL; 12	DET; 22	POR; 22	CLE; 10	TOR; 26	MIS; 17	MDO; 19	ROA; 7	VAN; 12	LS; 25	HOU; 14	SRF; 11	FON; 6		18th	36	
1999	PacWest Racing	18	Reynard 99i	Mercedes-Benz IC108E V8 t	MIA; 8	MOT; 24	LBH; 13	NZR; 17	RIO; Inj	STL; Inj	MIL; Inj	POR; Inj	CLE; Inj	ROA; Inj	TOR; Inj	MIS; Inj	DET; 10	MDO; 13	CHI; 21	VAN; 19	LS; 12	HOU; 24	SRF; 19	FON; 16	23rd	9	
2000	PacWest Racing	18	Reynard 2Ki	Mercedes-Benz IC108F V8 t	MIA; 13	LBH; 8	RIO; 7	MOT; 19	NZR; 17	MIL; 17	DET; 11	POR; 20	CLE; 12	TOR; 22	MIS; 19	CHI; 23	MDO; 14	ROA; 11	VAN; 25	LS; 13	STL; 23	HOU; 20	SRF; 11	FON; 15	21st	18	

=== Complete WRC results ===
Year	Entrant	Car	1	2	3	4	5	6	7	8	9	10	11	12	13	14	WDC	Points
2002	MG Sport & Racing	MG ZR S1600	MON	SWE	FRA	ESP	CYP	ARG	GRC	KEN	FIN	GER	ITA	NZL	AUS	GBR; Ret	NC	0

=== Complete American Le Mans Series results ===
Year	Entrant	Class	Chassis	Engine	1	2	3	4	5	6	7	8	9	Rank	Points	Ref
2003	Team Bentley	LMGTP	Bentley Speed 8	Bentley 4.0 L Turbo V8	SEB; 3	ATL	SON	TRO	MOS	AME	MON	MIA	PET	21st	19	

=== Complete British Touring Car Championship results ===
(key) Races in bold indicate pole position (1 point awarded – 2002–2003 all races, 2004–present just in first race) Races in italics indicate fastest lap (1 point awarded all races) * signifies that driver lead race for at least one lap (1 point awarded – 2002 just in feature races, 2003–present all races)

Year	Team	Car	1	2	3	4	5	6	7	8	9	10	11	12	13	14	15	16	17	18	19	20	21	22	23	24	25	26	27	28	29	30	DC	Pts
2019	TradePriceCars.com	Audi S3 Saloon	BRH; 1; 14	BRH; 2; 27	BRH; 3; 19	DON; 1; 23	DON; 2 Ret	DON; 3; 22	THR; 1; 27	THR; 2 Ret	THR; 3 Ret	CRO; 1; 21	CRO; 2; 26	CRO; 3; 19	OUL; 1 Ret	OUL; 2; 23	OUL; 3; 18	SNE; 1; 23	SNE; 2; 21	SNE; 3 Ret	THR; 1; 27	THR; 2; 26	THR; 3; 27	KNO; 1; 20	KNO; 2; 24	KNO; 3; 21	SIL; 1 Ret	SIL; 2; 18	SIL; 3; 13	BRH; 1; 22	BRH; 2 Ret	BRH; 3; 20	27th	5

Sporting positions
Preceded by Volker Weidler; Johnny Herbert; Bertrand Gachot	Winner of the 24 Hours of Le Mans; 1992; With: Derek Warwick & Yannick Dalmas	Succeeded by Geoff Brabham; Christophe Bouchut; Éric Hélary
Awards
Preceded by Damon Hill	Autosport; British Competition Driver of the Year; 1997	Succeeded by Dario Franchitti
