= Stefano Proetto =

Italian racing driver (born 1985)

- Nationality: (Italy) Italian
- Born: 8 March 1985 (age 41) Gräfelfing (Germany)

Volkswagen Scirocco R-Cup career
- Car number: 21

Stefano Proetto (born 8 March 1985 in Gräfelfing, Bavaria, Germany) is an Italian former racing driver based in Munich. He has competed in series such as the Formula Renault 3.5 Series, Formula 3 Euro Series and Formula Renault V6 Eurocup. He won the race at Germany's Norisring on the way to finishing fifth overall in the 2010 Volkswagen Scirocco R-Cup season. He was also the winner of the 2000 Margutti Cup. He has competed for French and Swiss racing teams.
