= 1995 Japanese Grand Prix =

Formula One motor race

Coordinates: 34°50′35″N 136°32′26″E

Race 16 of 17 in the 1995 Formula One World Championship
← Previous race	Next race →

Race details
- Date: 29 October 1995
- Official name: XXI Fuji Television Japanese Grand Prix
- Location: Suzuka Circuit; Suzuka, Mie, Japan
- Course: Permanent racing facility
- Course length: 5.859 km (3.641 miles)
- Distance: 53 laps, 310.588 km (192.990 miles)
- Weather: Rain, later dried out
- Attendance: 330,000

Pole position
Driver	(Germany) Michael Schumacher	Benetton-Renault
- Time: 1:38.023

Fastest lap
Driver	(Germany) Michael Schumacher	Benetton-Renault
- Time: 1:42.976 on lap 33

Podium
First	(Germany) Michael Schumacher	Benetton-Renault
Second	(Finland) Mika Häkkinen	McLaren-Mercedes
Third	(United Kingdom) Johnny Herbert	Benetton-Renault

The 1995 Japanese Grand Prix (formally the XXI Fuji Television Japanese Grand Prix) was a Formula One motor race held at the Suzuka Circuit, Suzuka on 29 October 1995. It was the sixteenth and penultimate race of the 1995 Formula One World Championship. The 53-lap race was won from pole position by German Michael Schumacher, driving a Benetton-Renault, with Finn Mika Häkkinen second in a McLaren-Mercedes and Schumacher's British teammate Johnny Herbert third.

Jean Alesi, driving for Ferrari, started second, alongside Schumacher. However, Alesi was forced to serve a 10-second stop-and-go penalty because his car moved forward before the start. Alesi climbed back up to second, before retiring on lap 25. Schumacher's rival in the Drivers' Championship, Damon Hill, started fourth amidst pressure from the British media after poor performances at previous races. Hill moved up to second because of Alesi's retirement, but spun off the track on lap 40.

Schumacher's win was his ninth of the season, matching the record set in 1992 by Nigel Mansell. Benetton was confirmed Constructors' Champions as Williams could not pass its points total in the one remaining race.

This was the last race before the 2007 Brazilian Grand Prix in which three Japanese drivers participated. This race marked that last time until 2010 Bahrain Grand Prix that 24 drivers and cars started a Grand Prix.

== Background ==
Heading into the penultimate race of the season, Benetton driver Michael Schumacher had already won the season's Drivers' Championship, having clinched the title at the previous race, the Pacific Grand Prix. Schumacher led the championship with 92 points; Damon Hill was second with 59 points. A maximum of 20 points were available for the remaining two races, which meant that Hill could not catch Schumacher. Although the Drivers' Championship was decided, the Constructors' Championship was not. Benetton were leading on 123 points and Williams were second with 102 points heading into the 16th race, with a maximum of 32 points available. In the week leading up to the race, Hill was criticised by the British media after poor performances in previous races; there was continued speculation that Williams were going to replace him with Heinz-Harald Frentzen or Gerhard Berger for the 1996 season. Despite the rumours, Williams team boss Frank Williams gave Hill "an unequivocal vote of confidence" heading into the race.

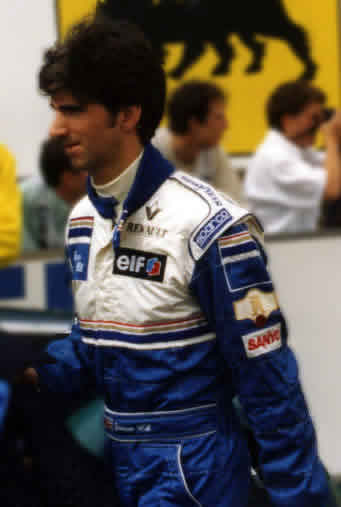
Damon Hill was criticised by the British media after poor performances

There were two driver changes heading into the race. Having been in one of the two Sauber cars since the fifth race of the season at Monaco, Jean-Christophe Boullion was released from the team and replaced by Karl Wendlinger. The Austrian was given another chance to prove himself after suffering an accident at the 1994 Monaco Grand Prix, which left him in a coma for weeks. The second driver change was Mika Häkkinen's return to McLaren after missing the Pacific Grand Prix because of an operation for appendicitis.

== Practice and qualifying ==
Two practice sessions were held before the race; the first was held on Friday morning and the second on Saturday morning. Both sessions lasted 1 hour and 45 minutes with weather conditions dry throughout. Schumacher was fastest in the first session, posting a time of 1:40.410, two-tenths of a second quicker than Häkkinen. The Williams and Ferrari cars occupied the remaining top six positions; Williams drivers Hill and David Coulthard third and fifth respectively. The Ferrari cars were fourth and sixth fastest; Jean Alesi ahead of Berger. Häkkinen lapped faster than Schumacher in the second practice session with a time of 1:40.389. Eddie Irvine took second place in the Jordan car, three-tenths of a second behind Häkkinen. Hill was third in the Williams, two-tenths behind Häkkinen, with Schumacher fourth behind Hill. The Ferrari cars were fifth and eighth; Alesi in front of Berger. Frentzen's Sauber and Coulthard's Williams split the Ferrari drivers. Despite both the Williams cars going off into the gravel, Hill and Coulthard made the top 10.

"Nobody is more disappointed than myself and the team. We have to investigate why we were not competitive. I was surprised by the performance of the McLaren and even more impressed by Michael's [Schumacher] performance at the end of the session."

— Damon Hill, commenting on his and Williams qualifying performance.

The qualifying session was split into two one-hour sessions; the first was held on Friday afternoon with the second held on Saturday afternoon. The fastest time from either sessions counted towards their final grid position. Schumacher clinched his tenth career pole position, in his Benetton B195, with a time of 1:38.023. He was joined on the front row by Alesi, who was eight-tenths of a second behind. Schumacher was particularly pleased with the performance of his Benetton, saying that "I have rarely had such a good car ... I think I can be confident for the race". Alesi was satisfied about his performance, but worried about a mechanical problem which had caused him to crash on Friday, accusing the Ferrari team of withholding information from him. Alesi was scheduled to leave Ferrari for Benetton in a swap with Schumacher at the end of the season, and the relationship between him and the team was becoming increasingly strained. Häkkinen was third in the McLaren, with Hill fourth, a second slower than Schumacher. Despite Häkkinen's best qualifying effort of the season alongside his Belgium third place, his teammate, Mark Blundell, had a disappointing qualifying session. In the first part of qualifying, Blundell crashed into the wall, meaning he could not set a time as his car was too badly damaged. Blundell had his second crash of the weekend at the 130R corner in Saturday practice, which was more serious than the first. Following medical advice, Blundell did not participate in the second qualifying session. He was unable to set a time, leaving him at the back of the grid. Aguri Suzuki crashed his Ligier during Saturday qualifying; he was unable to start the race since he was in a hospital with a broken rib.

=== Qualifying classification ===
Pos	No	Driver	Constructor	Q1	Q2	Gap
1	1	(Germany) Michael Schumacher	Benetton-Renault	1:38.428	1:38.023	
2	27	(France) Jean Alesi	Ferrari	1:39.127	1:38.888	+0.865
3	8	(Finland) Mika Häkkinen	McLaren-Mercedes	1:39.127	1:38.954	+0.931
4	5	(United Kingdom) Damon Hill	Williams-Renault	1:39.032	1:39.158	+1.009
5	28	(Austria) Gerhard Berger	Ferrari	1:40.305	1:39.040	+1.017
6	6	(United Kingdom) David Coulthard	Williams-Renault	1:39.155	1:39.368	+1.132
7	15	(United Kingdom) Eddie Irvine	Jordan-Peugeot	1:40.153	1:39.621	+1.598
8	30	(Germany) Heinz-Harald Frentzen	Sauber-Ford	1:40.010	1:40.380	+1.987
9	2	(United Kingdom) Johnny Herbert	Benetton-Renault	1:40.349	1:40.391	+2.326
10	14	(Brazil) Rubens Barrichello	Jordan-Peugeot	1:40.381	1:40.413	+2.358
11	26	(France) Olivier Panis	Ligier-Mugen-Honda	1:40.838	1:41.081	+2.815
12	4	(Finland) Mika Salo	Tyrrell-Yamaha	1:41.355	1:41.637	+3.332
13	25	(Japan) Aguri Suzuki	Ligier-Mugen-Honda	1:42.561	1:41.592	+3.569
14	3	(Japan) Ukyo Katayama	Tyrrell-Yamaha	1:41.977	1:42.273	+3.954
15	9	(Italy) Gianni Morbidelli	Footwork-Hart	1:42.623	1:42.059	+4.036
16	29	(Austria) Karl Wendlinger	Sauber-Ford	1:43.634	1:42.912	+4.889
17	23	(Portugal) Pedro Lamy	Minardi-Ford	1:43.387	1:43.102	+5.079
18	24	(Italy) Luca Badoer	Minardi-Ford	1:43.940	1:43.542	+5.519
19	10	(Japan) Taki Inoue	Footwork-Hart	1:44.386	1:44.074	+6.051
20	17	(Italy) Andrea Montermini	Pacific-Ford	1:46.869	1:46.097	+8.074
21	21	(Brazil) Pedro Diniz	Forti-Ford	1:46.654	1:47.166	+8.631
22	22	(Brazil) Roberto Moreno	Forti-Ford	1:50.097	1:48.267	+10.244
23	16	(France) Bertrand Gachot	Pacific-Ford	1:48.824	1:48.289	+10.266
24	7	(United Kingdom) Mark Blundell	McLaren-Mercedes	16:42.640	no time	+15:04.617

== Warm-up ==
The drivers took to the track at 09:30 JST (GMT +9) for a 30-minute warmup session. Despite underperforming in qualifying, both Williams cars performed better in the wet weather warmup session; Hill had the fastest time of 2:00.025. Coulthard was third in the other Williams car; Schumacher split them in second position. Alesi completed the top four, eight-tenths of a second behind Hill.

== Race ==
The track surface was damp for most of the race, which meant that lap times were slower than the previous days' qualifying sessions. Though 24 cars qualified for the race, only 22 took the start: Suzuki was unable to start because of his crash in qualifying and Roberto Moreno's Forti car suffered a gearbox problem. For the first time since the Japanese Grand Prix was held at Suzuka in 1987, tickets for the race did not sell out, despite the fact that three Japanese drivers entered the race.

The race started at 14:00 JST. All of the drivers opted to start on wet-weather tyres as the track was damp from the morning rain. Schumacher, from pole position on the grid, held onto the lead into the first corner. Alesi, who started alongside Schumacher, was judged to have jumped the start, and served a 10-second stop-and-go penalty on lap three, from which he returned to the race in tenth place. Alesi's teammate Berger also jumped the start and received the same penalty. Gianni Morbidelli, near the back of the field in one of the Footwork cars, spun at the first corner on lap one after being hit from behind by Wendlinger's Sauber. Morbidelli stalled his car in the process, forcing him to retire from the race. On lap seven, Alesi stopped at the pits to change to dry weather slick tyres, as the track was beginning to dry. On returning to the race, he began to make his way through the field constantly recording fastest laps; the first of which was 1:54.416, five seconds faster than the remainder of the field. Schumacher made a pit stop on lap 10 for slicks, handing the lead to Häkkinen for a lap before he too pitted. Alesi's progress was interrupted when he spun attempting to pass Pedro Lamy's Minardi for 15th place, but he made his way up to second by lap 10, overtaking Hill around the outside in the final chicane to take the place. Alerted by Alesi's pace on the slick tyres, the other drivers came into the pits to change to slick tyres.

The two Jordan cars collided on lap 15. Rubens Barrichello spun in the final chicane when he attempted to brake later than his teammate Irvine. Barrichello hit a wall, which damaged his car's rear wing and caused him to retire from the race. Irvine was involved in another collision at the chicane on lap 20 when Frentzen hit him from behind. Irvine continued without damage, but Frentzen had to pit for a new front wing. At the front, Alesi was lapping faster than Schumacher, even though Schumacher was on dry tyres. Alesi was only six seconds behind Schumacher when his Ferrari 412T2 suffered an apparent differential failure on lap 25. It was later discovered that the problem was a driveshaft failure, possibly as a result of his earlier spin. Schumacher made a pit stop for a second time on lap 31, returning to the race in second place behind Hill. Schumacher set the fastest lap of the race on lap 33, and regained his lead on the next lap when Hill made his pit stop. Behind them, Häkkinen and Coulthard were third and fourth respectively before their pit stops, but Coulthard pitted six laps later than Häkkinen and returned to the track in third place, one place ahead of the Finn. Johnny Herbert was fifth in the second Benetton car after the second round of pit stops, with Irvine rounding out the point-scoring places in sixth.

At this stage, the rain began to fall again, but only at the Spoon Curve end of the track. The Williams drivers were second and third until Hill ran off the track at Spoon Curve two laps after his pit stop. He damaged his front wing in the process and returned to the track in fourth. Hill returned to the pits to let his pit crew replace the damaged wing. He rejoined fifth, but was then given a ten-second stop-and-go penalty for speeding in the pitlane. Coulthard made the same mistake as his teammate by running through the gravel trap at the Spoon Curve but looked like he was going to escape with only minor damage. However, as he braked for 130R, the next corner, the gravel which had entered his sidepods flew out, causing him to lose control and get his car stuck in the gravel trap. Hill was told by his team on the radio to speed up as he had not yet taken his stop-and-go penalty, but later that lap he spun off at Spoon Curve and retired from the race without having taken the penalty. Blundell, Irvine and Frentzen also left the track at Spoon Curve but all finished the race. With his closest challenger out, Schumacher won the race after 53 laps to secure his ninth victory of the season in a time of 1:36:52.930. The win, along with Herbert's third place and the retirements of Hill and Coulthard, gave Benetton the 1995 Constructors' Championship. Häkkinen finished second in his McLaren, 20 seconds behind Schumacher. Irvine was fourth in his Jordan with Olivier Panis fifth in his Ligier. Mika Salo took sixth place and the final point in his Tyrrell. Despite starting last, Blundell finished in seventh, just 1.6 seconds behind Salo. The delayed Frentzen, Luca Badoer, Wendlinger, Lamy and Taki Inoue completed the finishers.

== Post-race ==
"It's a really great feeling now, because I fulfilled the promises that I made to the team at the beginning of the season to get both titles [Drivers' and Constructors']."

— Michael Schumacher, commenting on Benetton's 1995 season.

This was Schumacher's last win for Benetton, as he moved to the Ferrari team for the 1996 season. Herbert reiterated Schumacher's opinion by stating that Benetton did "a fantastic job". Hill was disappointed about the race and the season as a whole; he said afterwards:

Just when you think that it couldn't get any worse, it does. There is no easy way out of this, you just have to keep pressing on. The easiest thing to do is to give up, and it would probably be less painful that way, but that is not an option. While we were in the race we were competitive and I was in with a shout, I suppose, all the time I was on the track. But things took a massive turn for the worse, I am afraid. I drove through the rain and the second time I spun off I think it was oil rather than rain. It is not a glorious end to the season but the ingredients are all there and there is no reason why we should not get into the winning habit again.

As a result of Hill not taking his 10-second stop-and-go penalty because of his retirement, Williams were fined $10,000 by Formula One's governing body, the Fédération Internationale de l'Automobile (FIA). In an interview with Motor Sport magazine in 2008, Hill said that the 1995 season, as a whole, "went down, mentally, and it all just got to me". He also said he believed that it was in 1995 that Frank Williams and Patrick Head decided to replace him for the 1997 season.

1980 Formula One World Champion Alan Jones praised Alesi's performance, saying that it "will go down as one of the great drives in Grand Prix racing". Alesi stated that if his driveshaft had not failed, he would "have fought for it, all the way to the end". Alesi added that he believed he did not jump the start, but admitted that "the car crept forwards by a few centimetres" because of the downhill slope of the grid. In an interview with Autosport magazine in 2009, Alesi said that he went to see the race director before the race to see how he could avoid a penalty at the downhill start and that he was "totally fed up" with the penalty decision given. Berger also questioned his penalty, claiming that his car did not move before the green light went on. Alesi has mentioned several times that this was "the race of my life".

=== Race classification ===
Pos	No	Driver	Constructor	Laps	Time/Retired	Grid	Points
1	1	(Germany) Michael Schumacher	Benetton-Renault	53	1:36:52.930	1	10
2	8	(Finland) Mika Häkkinen	McLaren-Mercedes	53	+ 19.337	3	6
3	2	(United Kingdom) Johnny Herbert	Benetton-Renault	53	+ 1:23.804	9	4
4	15	(United Kingdom) Eddie Irvine	Jordan-Peugeot	53	+ 1:42.136	7	3
5	26	(France) Olivier Panis	Ligier-Mugen-Honda	52	+ 1 lap	11	2
6	4	(Finland) Mika Salo	Tyrrell-Yamaha	52	+ 1 lap	12	1
7	7	(United Kingdom) Mark Blundell	McLaren-Mercedes	52	+ 1 lap	23	
8	30	(Germany) Heinz-Harald Frentzen	Sauber-Ford	52	+ 1 lap	8	
9	24	(Italy) Luca Badoer	Minardi-Ford	51	+ 2 laps	17	
10	29	(Austria) Karl Wendlinger	Sauber-Ford	51	+ 2 laps	15	
11	23	(Portugal) Pedro Lamy	Minardi-Ford	51	+ 2 laps	16	
12	10	(Japan) Taki Inoue	Footwork-Hart	51	+ 2 laps	18	
Ret	5	(United Kingdom) Damon Hill	Williams-Renault	40	Spun off	4	
Ret	6	(United Kingdom) David Coulthard	Williams-Renault	39	Spun off	6	
Ret	21	(Brazil) Pedro Diniz	Forti-Ford	32	Spun off	20	
Ret	27	(France) Jean Alesi	Ferrari	24	Driveshaft	2	
Ret	17	(Italy) Andrea Montermini	Pacific-Ford	23	Spun off	19	
Ret	28	(Austria) Gerhard Berger	Ferrari	16	Electrical	5	
Ret	14	(Brazil) Rubens Barrichello	Jordan-Peugeot	15	Spun off	10	
Ret	3	(Japan) Ukyo Katayama	Tyrrell-Yamaha	12	Spun off	13	
Ret	16	(France) Bertrand Gachot	Pacific-Ford	6	Halfshaft	22	
Ret	22	(Brazil) Roberto Moreno	Forti-Ford	1	Gearbox	21	
Ret	9	(Italy) Gianni Morbidelli	Footwork-Hart	0	Spun off	14	
DNS	25	(Japan) Aguri Suzuki	Ligier-Mugen-Honda	0	Accident		

== Championship standings after the race ==
- **Bold text** indicates the World Champions.

Drivers' Championship standings

	Pos	Driver	Points
	1	(Germany) **Michael Schumacher**	102
	2	(United Kingdom) Damon Hill	59
	3	(United Kingdom) David Coulthard	49
1	4	(United Kingdom) Johnny Herbert	45
1	5	(France) Jean Alesi	42

Constructors' Championship standings

Pos	Constructor	Points
1	(United Kingdom) **Benetton-Renault**	137
2	(United Kingdom) Williams-Renault	102
3	(Italy) Ferrari	73
4	(United Kingdom) McLaren-Mercedes	27
5	(Republic of Ireland) Jordan-Peugeot	21

- Note: Only the top five positions are included for both sets of standings.

Previous race: 1995 Pacific Grand Prix	FIA Formula One World Championship; 1995 season	Next race: 1995 Australian Grand Prix
Previous race: 1994 Japanese Grand Prix	Japanese Grand Prix	Next race: 1996 Japanese Grand Prix
