= Pacific Grand Prix =

Formula One Grand Prix

- Laguna Seca Raceway (1960–1963); TI Circuit (1994–1995)
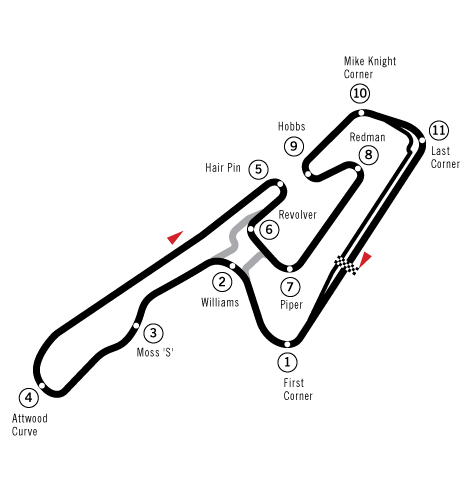

Race information
- Number of times held: 6
- First held: 1960
- Last held: 1995
- Most wins (drivers): (Germany) Michael Schumacher (2) (United Kingdom) Stirling Moss (2)
- Most wins (constructors): (United Kingdom) Benetton (2) (United Kingdom) Lotus (2)
- Circuit length: 3.703 km (2.300 miles)
- Race length: 307.349 km (192.093 miles)
- Laps: 83

Last race (1995)

Pole position
- (United Kingdom) David Coulthard; Williams-Renault; 1:14.013

Podium
- 1. (Germany) Michael Schumacher; Benetton-Renault; 1:48:49.972; 2. (United Kingdom) David Coulthard; Williams-Renault; +14.920; 3. (United Kingdom) Damon Hill; Williams-Renault; +48.333

Fastest lap
- (Germany) Michael Schumacher; Benetton-Renault; 1:16.374

The Pacific Grand Prix (Japanese: パシフィックグランプリ) was a round of the Formula One World Championship twice in the mid-1990s and non-championship events in the 1960s. The non-championship events were held at Laguna Seca in the United States from 1960 through 1963. The two championship races in 1994 and 1995 were held at the Tanaka International Aida circuit (now Okayama International Circuit), a slow and twisty 3.7-kilometre (2.3-mile) track in the countryside of Aida, Japan, under the title Pacific Grand Prix as the title of Japanese Grand Prix was held by a race held at the Suzuka circuit which was also located in Japan.

== Championship races ==
The inaugural Championship race in 1994 saw Michael Schumacher take an easy victory after Ayrton Senna was involved in a first corner accident with Mika Häkkinen and Nicola Larini. Schumacher overtook Senna into the first corner and was never threatened for the lead from that point onward. Schumacher could have lapped second placed Gerhard Berger in the last third of the race, but chose not to. The fastest lap was set on lap 3. The race was notable for the Jordan team and Rubens Barrichello's first podium finishes in F1 with third place. The more recent Pacific Grand Prix in 1995 was a more eventful affair, with some close racing throughout the field. Following the 1995 Kobe earthquake, the Pacific Grand Prix was moved from early in the calendar to the end of the calendar. The race culminated in a tactical victory for Michael Schumacher, securing his second World Championship, and making him the youngest double World Champion at the time (later surpassed by Fernando Alonso and Sebastian Vettel).

This race made Japan one of only nine countries (the others being Great Britain, Spain, Germany, Italy, France, the United States, and, as a result of emergency schedule realignment for the 2020 season due to COVID-19 pandemic, Austria and Bahrain) to host multiple Grands Prix in the same year. It was discontinued primarily due to the TI Circuit's location in a remote area of Japan; a similar criticism precluded Autopolis' plans (under "Asian Grand Prix" name) to host a second Japanese race in 1993. A proposed attempt to continue the event's name with a race in Sentul International Circuit in Indonesia was considered for 1996 (with date scheduled for 13 October), but it was cancelled as the corners were deemed too tight and unsuitable for Formula 1.

With the announcement that the Japanese Grand Prix would switch from the Suzuka Circuit to the Fuji Speedway from 2007, there had been media speculation that Suzuka may retain a race under a resurrection of the Pacific Grand Prix title. However, it was later announced that the Japanese Grand Prix would alternate between Fuji and Suzuka from 2009 onward although the alternation was cancelled as Toyota, the current Fuji Speedway owner discontinued further F1 races at Fuji, having pulled out of F1 at the end of 2009.

== Winners ==
=== By year ===
Layout of Laguna Seca at the time the event was held there as a non-championship event.

A pink background indicates an event which was not part of the Formula One World Championship.

Year	Driver	Constructor	Location	Report
1960	(United Kingdom) Stirling Moss	Lotus-Climax	Laguna Seca	Report
1961	(United Kingdom) Stirling Moss	Lotus-Climax	Laguna Seca	Report
1962	(United States) Roger Penske	Zerex Special–Climax	Laguna Seca	Report
1963	(United States) Dave MacDonald	Cooper-Ford	Laguna Seca	Report
1964 – 1993	Not held			
1994	(Germany) Michael Schumacher	Benetton-Ford	TI Circuit	Report
1995	(Germany) Michael Schumacher	Benetton-Renault	TI Circuit	Report

=== Repeat winners (drivers) ===
A pink background indicates an event which was not part of the Formula One World Championship.

Wins	Driver	Years won
2	(United Kingdom) Stirling Moss	1960, 1961
2	(Germany) Michael Schumacher	1994, 1995

=== Repeat winners (constructors) ===
A pink background indicates an event which was not part of the Formula One World Championship.

Wins	Constructor	Years won
2	(United Kingdom) Lotus	1960, 1961
2	(United Kingdom) Benetton	1994, 1995

=== Repeat winners (engine manufacturers) ===
A pink background indicates an event which was not part of the Formula One World Championship.

Wins	Manufacturer	Years won
3	(United Kingdom) Climax	1960, 1961, 1962
2	(United States) Ford *	1963, 1994

* Built by Cosworth
