= 1995 Pacific Grand Prix =

Formula One motor race held in 1995

Race 15 of 17 in the 1995 Formula One World Championship
← Previous race	Next race →
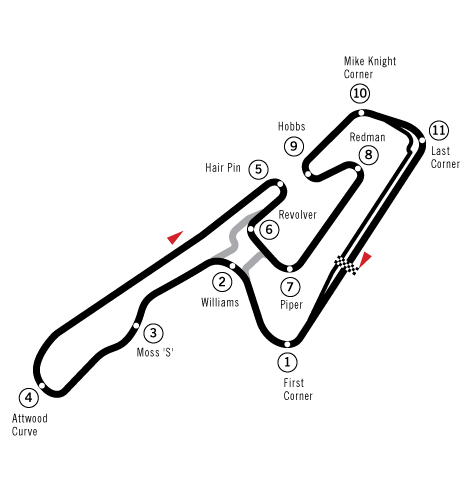

Race details
- Date: 22 October 1995
- Official name: II Pacific Grand Prix
- Location: TI Circuit, Aida, Japan
- Course: Permanent racing facility
- Course length: 3.704 km (2.314 miles)
- Distance: 83 laps, 307.349 km (192.093 miles)
- Weather: Cloudy, dry

Pole position
Driver	(United Kingdom) David Coulthard	Williams-Renault
- Time: 1:14.013

Fastest lap
Driver	(Germany) Michael Schumacher	Benetton-Renault
- Time: 1:16.374 on lap 40

Podium
First	(Germany) Michael Schumacher	Benetton-Renault
Second	(United Kingdom) David Coulthard	Williams-Renault
Third	(United Kingdom) Damon Hill	Williams-Renault

The 1995 Pacific Grand Prix (formally the II Pacific Grand Prix) was a Formula One motor race held on 22 October 1995 at the TI Circuit, Aida, Japan. It was the fifteenth round of the 1995 Formula One World Championship. Michael Schumacher for the Benetton team won the 83-lap race starting from third position. David Coulthard, who started the Grand Prix from pole position, finished second in a Williams car, with Damon Hill third in the other Williams. Schumacher's win confirmed him as 1995 Drivers' Champion, as Hill could not pass Schumacher's points total with only two races remaining. This was also the last race for Jean-Christophe Boullion.

Hill started the race alongside Coulthard on the front row, amidst pressure from the British media for not being "forceful" enough in battles. Schumacher attempted to drive around the outside of Hill at the first corner, but Hill held Schumacher off as Jean Alesi, driving for Ferrari, got past both on the inside line to take second position. As a result, Hill dropped down to third and Schumacher dropped down to fifth behind Gerhard Berger. Schumacher then managed to get past Alesi and Hill during the first of three pit stops. This allowed him, on a new set of slick tyres, to close on Coulthard who was on a two-stop strategy. Schumacher opened up a gap of 21 seconds by lapping two seconds faster per lap than Coulthard, so that when his third stop came, he still led the race.

== Background ==
The race, originally scheduled to be held as the third round of the season on 16 April 1995, was moved to October as the local infrastructure and communications were badly damaged from the Great Hanshin earthquake.

Heading into the 15th race of the season, Benetton driver Michael Schumacher was leading the Drivers' Championship with 82 points; Williams driver Damon Hill was second on 55 points, 27 points behind Schumacher. A maximum of 30 points were available for the remaining three races, which meant that Hill could still win the title. Schumacher only needed a fourth-place finish to become Drivers' Champion as, even if Hill won, Schumacher would be more than 20 points ahead of Hill with two races remaining. Behind Hill and Schumacher in the Drivers' Championship, David Coulthard was third on 43 points in a Williams, with Johnny Herbert and Jean Alesi both on 40 points. In the Constructors' Championship, Benetton were leading on 112 points and Williams were second on 92 points, with a maximum of 48 points available. In the two weeks leading up to the race, there was heavy criticism towards Damon Hill, with pundits feeling that Hill had not been "forceful" enough in his battle at the European Grand Prix against Schumacher. In an interview leading up to the race, part-time Ligier driver Martin Brundle said:

Damon has to do two things. First, he has to establish himself as the No1 at Williams for next year so the team can give him their full support. Second, he has to re-establish himself as a racer. Maybe he needs to lose a front wheel once or twice to re-establish himself.

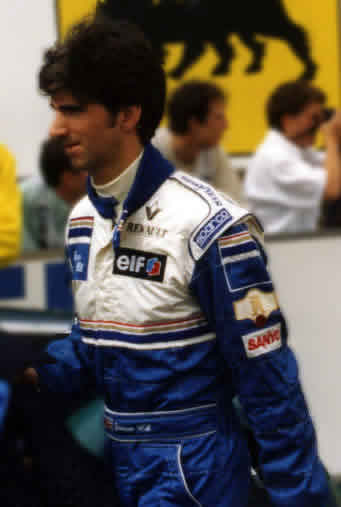
Damon Hill, who was criticised by pundits leading into the race

Schumacher, his title-rival, said that Hill made "half-hearted attempts" to overtake, which led to him "getting into trouble". The comments were prompted after a series of battles between Hill and Schumacher in previous race meetings, most notably at the Belgian Grand Prix, where Hill accused Schumacher of blocking him. At a Fédération Internationale de l'Automobile (FIA) World Motor Sport Council meeting on October 19 to discuss driver etiquette, they opted against introducing new rules on the issue. Formula One's governing body emphasised that the International Sporting Code would be enforced on the basis that drivers are free to drive as they wish "provided they do not deliberately endanger another driver or repeatedly obstruct him on a straight", following incidents during the year involving Hill and Schumacher.

Williams were favourites to win the race due to the nature of the track—their Williams FW17 car was more suited to high-downforce tracks like Aida, and thus had the advantage over Benetton. In an attempt to match the pace of the Williams cars, Benetton introduced a revised rear suspension geometry to the Benetton B195 for the race.

There were five driver changes heading into the race. Having been in one of the two Ligier cars since the tenth race of the season at Germany, Martin Brundle was replaced by Aguri Suzuki as part of the two sharing the drive for the season. Jan Magnussen was drafted into the McLaren team to replace Mika Häkkinen because of the Finn's operation for appendicitis. The third driver change was Ukyo Katayama's return to Tyrrell after missing the European Grand Prix due to a crash at the Portuguese Grand Prix. Gianni Morbidelli returned to the Footwork team replacing Max Papis, while at Pacific, Bertrand Gachot came back to replace Jean-Denis Délétraz, both men having driven for these teams at the start of the season. Délétraz was replaced as he had not made agreed payment instalments to the Pacific team for the privilege of the drive. Pacific had originally intended to run local driver Katsumi Yamamoto in place of Délétraz, but he was not granted an FIA Super Licence and so Gachot retook the seat. Similarly, the Forti team's plans to replace Roberto Moreno with Hideki Noda came to nought for the same reason, even though Noda had started three Grands Prix for the Larrousse team the previous year.

== Practice and qualifying ==
"For me it was just a case of going out for my last run and trying to do better just in case Michael improved. But it was so close to the end of the session that I had to be out on the circuit; there wasn't time to see if Michael went quicker, then go out and try for a time if he did."

— David Coulthard, commenting on using a new set of slick tyres at the end of the session.

Two practice sessions were held before the race; the first was held on Friday morning and the second on Saturday morning. Both sessions lasted 1 hour and 45 minutes with weather conditions dry throughout. Schumacher set the fastest time in the first session, posting a lap of 1:16.057, three-tenths of a second quicker than Hill and Coulthard, in second and third places respectively. The Ferrari cars were fourth and fifth fastest; Gerhard Berger ahead of Jean Alesi, with McLaren driver Mark Blundell rounding out the top six. Coulthard lapped faster than Schumacher in the second practice session with a time of 1:15.730. Hill was second in the Williams, three-tenths of a second behind Coulthard. Eddie Irvine in the Jordan car was fourth, seven-tenths behind Coulthard. He was split by the Ferrari cars who were third and fifth; Alesi in front of Berger. The Benetton cars were sixth and seventh; Schumacher in front of Herbert. Heinz-Harald Frentzen and Jean-Christophe Boullion were eighth and tenth in the Sauber cars, with Rubens Barrichello ninth in the Jordan, two seconds off the pace.

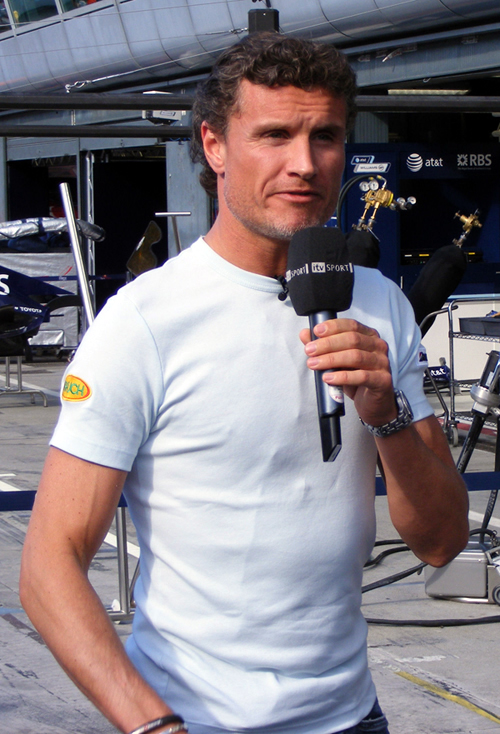
David Coulthard, who took pole position in his Williams car (picture taken in 2007, while driving at Red Bull Racing)

The qualifying session was split into two one-hour sessions; the first was held on Friday afternoon with the second held on Saturday afternoon. The fastest time from either sessions counted towards their final grid position. Coulthard clinched his fourth consecutive pole position, in his Williams, with a time of 1:14.013. He was joined on the front row by teammate Hill, who was two-tenths of a second behind. Schumacher was third in the Benetton, edging closer to the Williams drivers throughout both days of qualifying by steadily reducing the downforce on his car. His last run, right at the end of the second session, pressured Coulthard into leaving the pit lane to cover the German. The pole position man thus used an additional set of slick tyres, meaning that out of the allocation of seven sets of slick tyres as set out by the FIA, he had only two sets of brand-new rubber for the race, whereas Schumacher had the advantage of three sets of new rubber. Hill, concerned about starting from the dirty side of the track (the side of the track that is opposite to the racing line), had only two sets of brand new tyres for the race.

Berger took fourth despite going off into the gravel late in the second part of qualifying. Berger's teammate Alesi was fifth, with Irvine completing the top six for his best qualifying position of the season. Rookie Magnussen qualified 12th, only two places behind teammate Blundell, after not making a mistake in either of the two sessions. Returning drivers Suzuki, Katayama, Morbidelli and Gachot qualified 13th, 17th, 19th and 24th respectively, with the grid covered by 7.392 seconds.

=== Qualifying classification ===
Pos	No	Driver	Constructor	Q1 Time	Q2 Time	Gap
1	6	(United Kingdom) David Coulthard	Williams-Renault	1:14.182	1:14.013	—
2	5	(United Kingdom) Damon Hill	Williams-Renault	1:14.289	1:14.213	+0.200
3	1	(Germany) Michael Schumacher	Benetton-Renault	1:14.524	1:14.284	+0.271
4	27	(France) Jean Alesi	Ferrari	1:14.919	1:15.131	+0.906
5	28	(Austria) Gerhard Berger	Ferrari	1:14.974	1:15.125	+0.961
6	15	(United Kingdom) Eddie Irvine	Jordan-Peugeot	1:15.696	1:15.354	+1.341
7	2	(United Kingdom) Johnny Herbert	Benetton-Renault	1:15.561	1:15.556	+1.543
8	30	(Germany) Heinz-Harald Frentzen	Sauber-Ford	1:15.942	1:15.561	+1.548
9	26	(France) Olivier Panis	Ligier-Mugen-Honda	1:17.071	1:15.621	+1.608
10	7	(United Kingdom) Mark Blundell	McLaren-Mercedes	1:15.652	1:16.166	+1.639
11	14	(Brazil) Rubens Barrichello	Jordan-Peugeot	1:16.263	1:15.774	+1.761
12	8	(Denmark) Jan Magnussen	McLaren-Mercedes	1:16.339	1:16.368	+2.326
13	25	(Japan) Aguri Suzuki	Ligier-Mugen-Honda	1:17.019	1:16.519	+2.506
14	23	(Portugal) Pedro Lamy	Minardi-Ford	1:17.224	1:16.596	+2.583
15	29	(France) Jean-Christophe Boullion	Sauber-Ford	1:16.646	1:23.791	+2.633
16	24	(Italy) Luca Badoer	Minardi-Ford	1:17.612	1:16.887	+2.874
17	3	(Japan) Ukyo Katayama	Tyrrell-Yamaha	1:17.265	1:17.014	+3.001
18	4	(Finland) Mika Salo	Tyrrell-Yamaha	1:17.213	1:17.235	+3.200
19	9	(Italy) Gianni Morbidelli	Footwork-Hart	1:18.288	1:18.114	+4.101
20	10	(Japan) Taki Inoue	Footwork-Hart	1:19.471	1:18.212	+4.199
21	21	(Brazil) Pedro Diniz	Forti-Ford	1:20.555	1:19.579	+5.566
22	22	(Brazil) Roberto Moreno	Forti-Ford	1:19.745	1:19.779	+5.732
23	17	(Italy) Andrea Montermini	Pacific-Ford	1:22.096	1:20.093	+6.080
24	16	(France) Bertrand Gachot	Pacific-Ford	1:22.710	1:21.405	+7.392

== Warm-up ==
The drivers took to the track at 09:30 JST (GMT +9) for a 30-minute warm-up session. Both Williams cars maintained their good performance from qualifying; Coulthard had the fastest time of 1:16.831. Hill was third in the other Williams car; Boullion split them in the Sauber for second position. Olivier Panis completed the top four in a Ligier car, eight-tenths of a second behind Hill. Hill drove the spare Williams car along the inside of the start–finish straight in an effort to clean up his grid position on the dusty side of the track. Schumacher finished the session in eighth, despite going off the track, damaging his race car in the process.

== Race ==
The conditions for the race were dry with the air temperature 21 °C (70 °F). The remote and inaccessible nature of the circuit and the fact that the Japanese Grand Prix took place just one week later resulted in a meagre race-day crowd of only 15,000 spectators. The race started at 14:00 JST. Coulthard, from pole position on the grid, held onto the lead into the first corner. Hill, who started alongside Coulthard, had a bad start. Schumacher attempted to go around the outside of Hill at the first corner, but Hill held Schumacher off. Both drivers ran off the racing line in the process, allowing Alesi through into second place. At the end of lap one, Coulthard led Alesi by 2.8 seconds, with Hill a further three-tenths back. Berger was fourth, with Schumacher demoted to fifth. Bertrand Gachot in the Pacific became the first person to retire from the race with a gearbox problem on lap two. He was followed by Suzuki and Boullion, who both spun off the track and were unable to continue. Boullion blamed his spin on Minardi driver Pedro Lamy, whom he accused of weaving in front of him. Schumacher passed Berger for fourth position on lap five, and immediately began closing on Hill in third, who himself was only a few tenths behind Alesi. Schumacher attempted to pass Hill on lap 11 for third place at the hairpin, but Hill held him off. As Hill and Schumacher were held up by the slower Ferrari cars, Coulthard pulled away by more than a second a lap in the first eight laps. By lap 18, Coulthard's gap to second place was 14 seconds, and it appeared that he would win the race comfortably.

Alesi, Hill and Schumacher all made pit stops for their first of three stops on lap 18. The Benetton pitcrew made a quick stop for Schumacher, allowing him to get out ahead of Alesi and Hill. Hill lost additional time with a sticking refuelling valve, causing his stop to last almost twice as long as Schumacher's. Schumacher exited the pit stop in fourth place (behind Coulthard, and the yet-to-stop Berger and Herbert), with Alesi in seventh place (split from Schumacher by Irvine) and Hill in tenth place (separated from Alesi by Frentzen and Blundell). With Alesi and Hill held up by the slower runners on two-stop strategies in front, Schumacher pulled away and closed in on Coulthard. Blundell made a pit stop on the next lap, and Hill passed Frentzen on lap 22. On the following lap, Alesi passed Irvine at the hairpin; Hill tried to follow Alesi through but his front wing hit the rear of Irvine's car, causing minor damage. Irvine made a pit stop at the end of lap 25, allowing Hill to resume his chase of Alesi unimpeded. Like his teammate, Coulthard was scheduled to make three stops, but his pit strategy was changed to make only two by staying out six laps longer than originally scheduled, and then taking onboard more fuel than first planned at his first stop on lap 24. As a result of a lighter fuel load for Schumacher because of the different strategies, Schumacher began to consistently lap faster than the Scotsman.

Schumacher made his second stop on lap 38, and came out of the pit lane just in front of third-placed Alesi, but over twenty seconds behind Coulthard. Schumacher immediately began setting fastest laps and began to close in on Coulthard once more. Hill managed to move up to third, in front of Alesi, during their second pit stops on laps 38 and 39 respectively. The Ferrari of Alesi then dropped further back as teammate Berger passed him at the hairpin for fourth position on lap 45. Coulthard made his second and final stop for new tyres on lap 49; exiting 14 seconds behind Schumacher, who continued to extend the margin between the two. Coulthard was unable to capitalise on the performance advantage offered by the new tyres after the stop due to lapped traffic getting in his way. The German made his third and final pit stop on lap 60 with a 21-second advantage, exiting in front of Coulthard to lead the race. Schumacher opened the gap to 15 seconds, and won the race after 83 laps to secure his eighth victory of the season in a time of 1:48:49.972s. Schumacher was crowned the 1995 Drivers' Champion as Hill could not catch his points total with two races remaining. He also became the youngest double Drivers' Champion in Formula One history. Coulthard finished second in his Williams, 14 seconds behind Schumacher, with teammate Hill third. The Ferrari cars of Berger and Alesi were fourth and fifth respectively, but off the pace as Schumacher lapped them both in the closing stages. Berger suffered from a misfiring engine throughout the race. Herbert took the final point in sixth place for Benetton, ahead of Frentzen, Panis and Blundell. Throughout the race, Barrichello and Magnussen engaged in a battle for tenth and eleventh positions, with Magnussen keeping Barrichello behind until lap 37 when the Brazilian managed to overtake him into the hairpin. Magnussen finished in tenth place, but Barrichello subsequently retired on lap 67 with an engine problem. Magnussen's first race was described as "highly accomplished" by the year's Autocourse annual. After his impressive qualifying performance, Irvine was heading for eighth place, but made an unscheduled pit stop on lap 72 and dropped to eleventh. The attrition rate was low, with 17 of the 24 starters finishing the race.

== Post-race ==
After the race, it was revealed that Schumacher endured a downshift problem after his final stop, and that he was lucky to complete the final lap as warning lights had activated on his steering wheel. Schumacher praised his pitcrew for doing a "perfect" first stop which helped him move in front of Alesi and Hill. He said he "never saw anything like this team and its ability to come up with strategies" and that they never made "one mistake this season". Off-camera while going through parc fermé, Schumacher and Hill renewed their argument from the Belgian Grand Prix over what degree of blocking was acceptable after their first corner incident. Schumacher told Hill that he was unhappy with Hill's driving throughout the race, most notably during Schumacher's overtaking attempts on lap one and lap eleven where Schumacher felt Hill had "brake tested" him. Hill refuted Schumacher's claims, saying:

Michael wasn't happy with what I did a couple of times in the race and he has told me that he is unhappy with my driving. I find that extraordinary. The situation now is that we are completely free to drive as we like as long as it is not deliberately dangerous, So I drove in that style and he didn't like it. He should have no complaints ... somehow or other, when we got into the braking area at the end of the back straight I did something wrong. But I can't see what I did wrong. It seems that there is one rule for him and another for everybody else at times. I just think that either you agree to that, and there should be no complaints, or there are rules and you should stick to them. I think that I am a better, stronger driver this year than I was last year and can build on that for next year. Clearly Michael has an advantage over everyone and if I want to win, then I am going to have to overhaul him.

Despite Hill's comments, he endured continued criticism by the British media after the poor performance; speculation brewed that Williams were going to replace him with Frentzen for the 1996 season. Despite the rumours, Williams team boss Frank Williams gave Hill "an unequivocal vote of confidence" heading into the next race, the Japanese Grand Prix. Schumacher subsequently changed his opinion of the incident after watching video footage prior to the Japanese race and no longer blamed Hill for it.

During an interview Coulthard, who finished second, revealed that it was his decision to change to a two-stop strategy from a three-stop strategy, telling the Williams pitcrew to delay his stop. Afterwards, he said that in hindsight he would have stayed on a three-stop strategy, and wished he could "blame someone else for this decision, but I can't". The 1995 race was the last held at the Aida circuit, and the last Formula One race to date held under the Pacific Grand Prix banner, with the manager of the TI Circuit unable to keep the venue financially profitable.

=== Race classification ===
Pos	No	Driver	Constructor	Laps	Time/Retired	Grid	Points
1	1	(Germany) Michael Schumacher	Benetton-Renault	83	1:48:49.972	3	10
2	6	(United Kingdom) David Coulthard	Williams-Renault	83	+14.920	1	6
3	5	(United Kingdom) Damon Hill	Williams-Renault	83	+48.333	2	4
4	28	(Austria) Gerhard Berger	Ferrari	82	+1 lap	5	3
5	27	(France) Jean Alesi	Ferrari	82	+1 lap	4	2
6	2	(United Kingdom) Johnny Herbert	Benetton-Renault	82	+1 lap	7	1
7	30	(Germany) Heinz-Harald Frentzen	Sauber-Ford	82	+1 lap	8	
8	26	(France) Olivier Panis	Ligier-Mugen-Honda	81	+2 laps	9	
9	7	(United Kingdom) Mark Blundell	McLaren-Mercedes	81	+2 laps	10	
10	8	(Denmark) Jan Magnussen	McLaren-Mercedes	81	+2 laps	12	
11	15	(United Kingdom) Eddie Irvine	Jordan-Peugeot	81	+2 laps	6	
12	4	(Finland) Mika Salo	Tyrrell-Yamaha	80	+3 laps	18	
13	23	(Portugal) Pedro Lamy	Minardi-Ford	80	+3 laps	14	
14	3	(Japan) Ukyo Katayama	Tyrrell-Yamaha	80	+3 laps	17	
15	24	(Italy) Luca Badoer	Minardi-Ford	80	+3 laps	16	
16	22	(Brazil) Roberto Moreno	Forti-Ford	78	+5 laps	22	
17	21	(Brazil) Pedro Diniz	Forti-Ford	77	+6 laps	21	
Ret	14	(Brazil) Rubens Barrichello	Jordan-Peugeot	67	Electrical	11	
Ret	9	(Italy) Gianni Morbidelli	Footwork-Hart	63	Engine	19	
Ret	10	(Japan) Taki Inoue	Footwork-Hart	38	Electrical	20	
Ret	17	(Italy) Andrea Montermini	Pacific-Ford	14	Gearbox	23	
Ret	25	(Japan) Aguri Suzuki	Ligier-Mugen-Honda	10	Spun off	13	
Ret	29	(France) Jean-Christophe Boullion	Sauber-Ford	7	Spun off	15	
Ret	16	(France) Bertrand Gachot	Pacific-Ford	2	Gearbox	24	

== Championship standings after the race ==
- **Bold text** indicates who still had a theoretical chance of becoming World Champion

Drivers' Championship standings

	Pos	Driver	Points
	1	(Germany) **Michael Schumacher**	92
	2	(United Kingdom) Damon Hill	59
	3	(United Kingdom) David Coulthard	49
1	4	(France) Jean Alesi	42
1	5	(United Kingdom) Johnny Herbert	41

Constructors' Championship standings

Pos	Constructor	Points
1	(United Kingdom) **Benetton-Renault**	123
2	(United Kingdom) **Williams-Renault**	102
3	(Italy) Ferrari	73
4	(United Kingdom) McLaren-Mercedes	21
5	(Republic of Ireland) Jordan-Peugeot	18

- Note: Only the top five positions are included for both sets of standings

Previous race: 1995 European Grand Prix	FIA Formula One World Championship; 1995 season	Next race: 1995 Japanese Grand Prix
Previous race: 1994 Pacific Grand Prix	Pacific Grand Prix	Next race: N/A
