= 2000 Rio 200 =

(Brazil) 2000 Rio 200
Race details
- Race 3 of 20 in the 2000 CART season
- Date: April 30, 2000
- Location: Emerson Fittipaldi Speedway, Rio de Janeiro, Brazil
- Course: Permanent racing facility 1.864 mi / 3.000 km
- Distance: 108 laps 201.312 mi / 323.980 km
- Weather: Hot and sunny

Pole position
- Driver: (Canada) Alex Tagliani (Forsythe Racing)
- Time: 38.587 (173.91 mph)

Fastest lap
- Driver: (Canada) Alex Tagliani (Forsythe Racing)
- Time: 39.445 (on lap 70 of 108)

Podium
- First: (Mexico) Adrián Fernández (Patrick Racing)
- Second: (United States) Jimmy Vasser (Chip Ganassi Racing)
- Third: (Canada) Paul Tracy (Team Green)

The 2000 Rio 200 was a Championship Auto Racing Teams (CART) auto race held at the trapezoid-shaped Emerson Fittipaldi Speedway, Rio de Janeiro, Brazil on April 30, 2000. It was the third race of the 2000 CART FedEx Championship Series, the fifth (and last) running of the event, and the first round of the year to be held outside of the United States. The 108-lap race was won by Patrick Racing driver Adrián Fernández after he started from 16th. Jimmy Vasser of Chip Ganassi Racing finished second with Team Green's Paul Tracy third.

Tagliani set the fastest overall lap time in qualifying to start the race from pole position. He led for a total of 76 laps, more than any driver. However, Tagliani lost traction in his car on the 100th lap and spun in the second corner, promoting Fernández to the lead. The race ended under caution and no overtaking was permitted after Tagliani spun for a second time at the end of lap 105. Fernández thus won the race, his first of the season, and the sixth of his career. There were five cautions and eight lead changes among five different drivers during the course of the event.

The result of the race reduced Tracy's lead the Drivers' Championship to six points over Vasser. Roberto Moreno moved clear of Max Papis in their early season duel for third and Fernández's victory promoted him to fifth place. Ford Cosworth took the Manufacturers' Championship lead from Honda, with Toyota and Mercedes-Benz third and fourth with seventeen races left in the season.

== Background ==
The Rio 200 was confirmed as part of CART's 2000 series schedule in November 1999. It was the fifth consecutive year the Rio 200 was part of the series, the first of four straight oval track events, and the first round held outside of the United States. The Rio 200 was the third of twenty scheduled races for 2000 by CART, and was held at the 1.864-mile (3.000 km) four-turn Autódromo de Jacarepaguá trapezoid-shaped speedway on April 30. Drivers regarded the Autódromo de Jacarepaguá as "demanding" due to braking and shifting down gears being prioritized for the first and third turns. This led CART to mandate all teams run the high-downforce specification of the Handford MkII wings to attempt to alleviate stress placed on the car's brakes and gearboxes by increasing the amount of drag produced to slow vehicles. Additionally, sand was blown on the track by local wind conditions for most of the year, reducing grip and visibility.

Coming into the race from Long Beach two weeks earlier, Team Green driver Paul Tracy led the Drivers' Championship with 34 points. His nearest rival Jimmy Vasser of Chip Ganassi Racing was eight points adrift in second. Team Rahal's Max Papis and Roberto Moreno for Patrick Racing tied for third with 20 points apiece with the latter given priority in the points standings because of him winning the season-opening round at Homestead–Miami Speedway. Gil de Ferran of Team Penske was fifth with 18 points. In the Manufacturers' Championship, Honda were leading with 38 points, six ahead of the second-placed Ford Cosworth. Toyota were third with 26 points and Mercedes-Benz were fourth with eight points. Reynard topped the Constructors' Championship with 44 points, followed by Lola and Swift with 26 and 10 points, respectively. In terms of driver changes, Memo Gidley filled in for Patrick Carpentier at Forsythe Racing for the second successive round after Carpentier broke his left wrist at his Las Vegas home prior to Long Beach through losing his balance while carrying a heavy suitcase.

Tracy, the 1997 race winner, was circumspect about the prospects but spoke his belief he would keep the championship lead until the season-finale at California Speedway by employing a race-by-race approach: "We're only two races into a very long season, but I've got say that I like the way things have gone so far for the Team KOOL Green crew. Leading the championship makes you think about winning the title, but we know we've got a long way to go to reach that goal." Vasser stated he was comfortable with his new car package and aimed to continue his recent form into the Rio 200: "Obviously, it's way too early to be looking at the point standings but, as you learn pretty quickly, every point is important." Alex Tagliani aimed to maintain Forsythe Racing's strong form after Tracy's and Greg Moore's success at Rio in the late 1990s and would attempt to use this to maintain the team's strong record at the track, "We're all pulling in the same direction and I think that spirit of collaboration is evident in the results that we've been able to produce so far."

== Practice ==
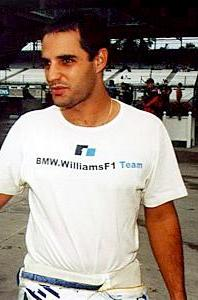
Juan Pablo Montoya (pictured in 2002) set the fastest overall lap time in the duo of Friday practice sessions.

There were three practice sessions preceding Sunday's race: two on Friday and one on Saturday. The first session ran for 90 minutes, the second 60 minutes, and the third 75 minutes. Conditions during the Friday practice sessions were hot and sunny. De Ferran set the first practice session's fastest lap at 39.610 seconds, followed by Tagliani, Tracy, Hélio Castroneves, Kenny Bräck, Vasser, Papis, Cristiano da Matta, Moreno, and Christian Fittipaldi. Five yellow flags were waved. The first was for Takuya Kurosawa whose engine failed on the exit of turn four. He turned left to leave the main straight and allow safety officials to extinguish a fire in the engine compartment. The next two cautions were necessitated when Luiz Garcia Jr. and Mark Blundell stalled on the track separately. Both were towed back to pit road by circuit officials. Gualter Salles caused the fourth yellow flag with a heavily crash against the right-hand barrier at the first corner. Salles was not injured but his car sustained heavy damage to its right-side suspension. He stopped in the centre of the circuit in turn two. The last caution was activated for Fittipaldi who stalled on track.

In the second practice session, Juan Pablo Montoya set the day's fastest lap with a time of 38.922 seconds and was the only driver to go below 39 seconds. He was almost three-tenths of a second faster than Bräck in second and Tagliani was third. Fittipaldi, Castroneves, Vasser, Da Matta, Papis, de Ferran, and Michael Andretti were in positions four through ten. The first three cautions came within half an hour of each other because debris and fluids were observed lying on the track and separate track inspections were needed to inspect and clean it. De Ferran caused the fourth caution by spinning in the third turn but avoided car damage. The final caution came out after Maurício Gugelmin spun in turn four and collided against a left-hand tire barrier with the rear of his car. Gugelmin was unhurt.

== Qualifying ==
Conditions remained hot and sunny during Saturday morning's practice session. The first caution came out for debris on the backstraight that needed clearing. Montoya prompted the second caution when he spun 360 degrees in turn four but did not damage his car. Bräck caused a third yellow flag after he stalled on the exit of pit road. Six minutes later, a fourth caution was waved for debris leaving the pit lane that course officials removed. The fifth yellow flags were necessitated after Moreno broke his right-front wheel and wing endplate in a collision with the turn one outside barrier. Bryan Herta stalled on the backstraight and triggered the final caution with 14 minutes to go. Tagliani continued to perform well with the fastest lap of the session at 38.694 seconds. Montoya was one-tenth of a second slower in second, and Tracy replicated his first practice result in third. Bräck, Fittipaldi, Papis, Tony Kanaan, Castroneves, Vasser, and Adrián Fernández completed the top ten ahead of qualifying.

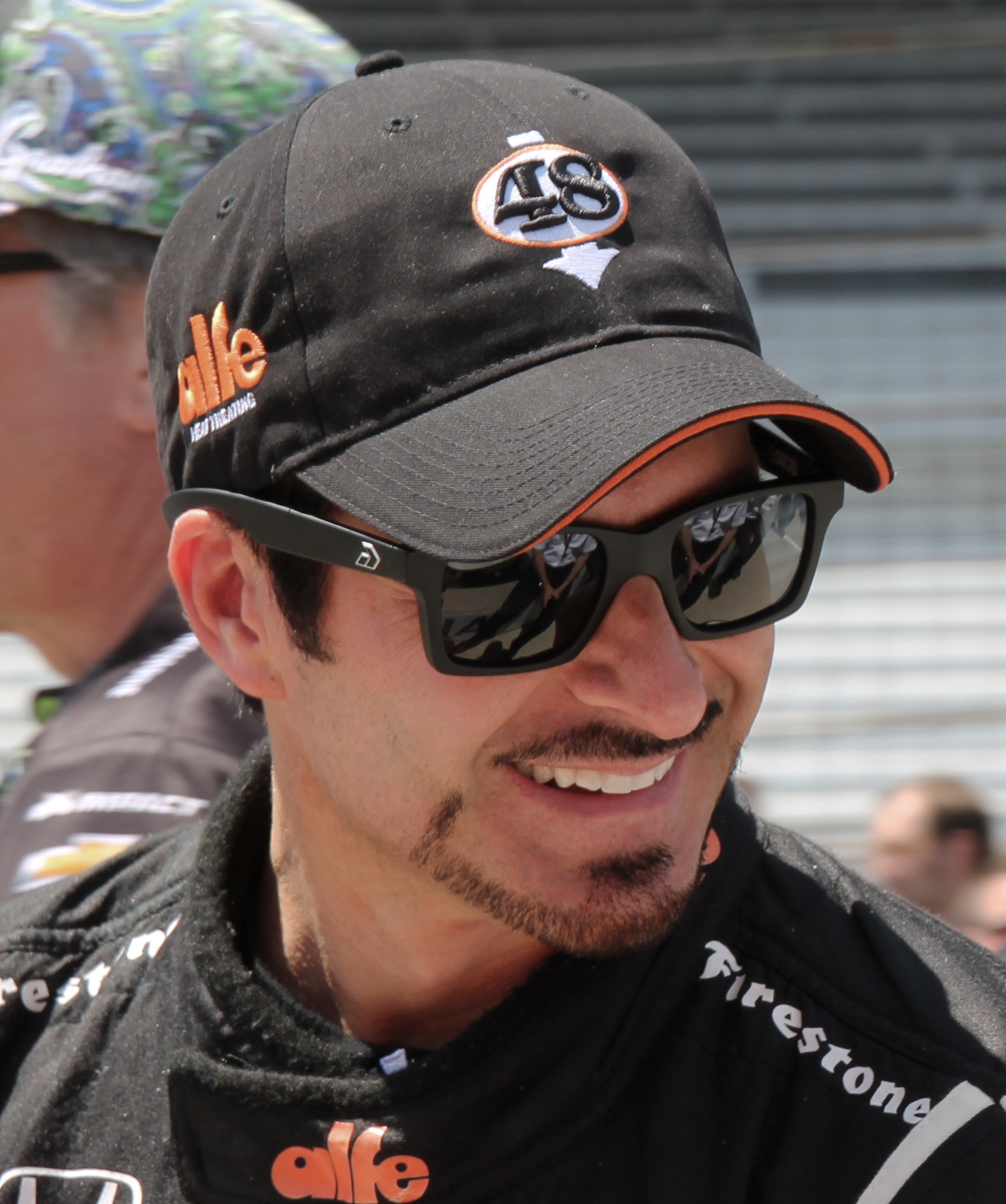
Alex Tagliani (pictured in 2015) won the first pole position of his career.

Saturday afternoon's 135 minute qualifying session began with the slowest driver in the weekend's combined practice sessions going out first and the quickest competitor ventured out last. Each driver was restricted to two timed laps and the starting order was determined by the competitor's fastest lap times. One point was awarded to the pole position winner. Tagliani took the first pole position of his career with a lap of 38.587 seconds. He was joined on the grid's front row by Montoya who was 0.109 seconds slower because of an oversteer in the first corner. Tracy's car steeped out of him once he accelerated out of turn one and took third. Bräck was fourth, and the fastest Brazilian was Fittipaldi in fifth. Vasser changed the set-up of his car to go sixth. Castroneves was unhappy with the set-up of his vehicle and took seventh. Dario Franchitti ran slightly wide by driving too fast into turn four on his fastest lap and was eighth. Rounding out the top ten were Kanaan and Papis.

Gidley was the fastest driver not to qualify in the top ten; his fastest time of 39.246 seconds was nearly seven-tenths of a second slower than Tagliani because he had to control his car from spinning going off turn four. Moreno went to his back-up car to suit his driving style and set the 12th-fastest time. A car setup fault restricted De Ferran to 13th. Oriol Servià, Andretti and Fernández qualified in positions 14 to 16. Da Matta (17th) and Norberto Fontana (18th) were required to qualify with a second run after mechanical issues hindered them on their first tyres. Kurosawa and Herta took 19th and 20th. Gugelmin and his PacWest teammate Blundell had a large amount of push in the centre of the corners and too much oversteer coming out of them left them in 21st and 23rd. The pair were separated by Michel Jourdain Jr. in 22nd after he lost some straight line speed but was faster in the turns despite an oversteer leaving them. Garcia's lack of on-circuit time in his car meant he began from 24th. Salles did not set a lap time because his team continued to repair his car following his first practice session crash. After qualifying, Garcia's best lap time was annulled because his car failed post-race inspection for minimum weight requirements. Garcia was consequently ordered to start from the back of the grid.

=== Qualifying classification ===
Final qualifying classification
Pos	No.	Driver	Team	Time	Speed	Gap
1	33	Alex Tagliani (CAN)	Forsythe Racing	38.587	173.903	—
2	1	Juan Pablo Montoya (COL)	Chip Ganassi Racing	38.696	173.403	+0.109
3	26	Paul Tracy (CAN)	Team Green	38.843	172.757	+0.256
4	8	Kenny Bräck (SWE)	Team Rahal	38.876	172.610	+0.289
5	11	Christian Fittipaldi (BRA)	Newman/Haas Racing	38.879	172.597	+0.292
6	12	Jimmy Vasser (USA)	Chip Ganassi Racing	38.943	172.313	+0.356
7	3	Hélio Castroneves (BRA)	Team Penske	38.985	172.128	+0.396
8	27	Dario Franchitti (GBR)	Team Green	39.026	171.947	+0.439
9	55	Tony Kanaan (BRA)	Mo Nunn Racing	39.101	171.617	+0.514
10	7	Max Papis (ITA)	Team Rahal	39.227	171.066	+0.640
11	32	Memo Gidley (USA)	Forsythe Racing	39.246	170.983	+0.659
12	20	Roberto Moreno (BRA)	Patrick Racing	39.265	170.900	+0.678
13	2	Gil de Ferran (BRA)	Team Penske	39.298	170.757	+0.711
14	96	Oriol Servià (ESP)	PPI Motorsports	39.306	170.722	+0.719
15	6	Michael Andretti (USA)	Newman/Haas Racing	39.340	170.574	+0.753
16	40	Adrián Fernández (MEX)	Patrick Racing	39.391	170.354	+0.804
17	97	Cristiano da Matta (BRA)	PPI Motorsports	39.419	170.233	+0.832
18	10	Norberto Fontana (ARG)	Della Penna Motorsports	39.504	169.866	+0.917
19	19	Takuya Kurosawa (JPN)	Dale Coyne Racing	39.590	169.497	+1.003
20	5	Bryan Herta (USA)	Walker Motorsport	39.620	169.369	+1.033
21	17	Maurício Gugelmin (BRA)	PacWest Racing	39.682	169.104	+1.095
22	16	Michel Jourdain Jr. (MEX)	Bettenhausen Racing	39.856	168.366	+1.269
23	18	Mark Blundell (GBR)	PacWest Racing	40.073	167.454	+1.486
24	34	Gualter Salles (BRA)	Dale Coyne Racing	No time	No speed	—
25	25	Luiz Garcia Jr. (BRA)	Arciero Racing	No time	No speed	—^{1}

Notes

- ^1 — Luiz Garcia Jr. was sent to the rear of the field for failing a post-qualifying weight check.

== Warm-up ==
A half hour warm-up session was held in hot and sunny weather on the Sunday morning of the race. Although de Ferran was suffering from a head cold, he set the session's fastest lap at 39.289 seconds. Vasser was 0.002 seconds slower in second. The third-fastest time was set by Bräck while the fourth position was the pole position winner Tagliani. The quartet of Brazilians of da Matta. Kanaan, Fittipaldi and Gugelmin filled positions five through eight, with Tracy and Montoya ninth and tenth. Castroneves caused the session's first caution when he stopped with a faulty transmission between turns one and two. Bräck lost control of his car in the fourth corner, and he slid into a right-hand side tire barrier with his right-front wheel, damaging his front wing and suspension.

== Race ==
Weather conditions at the start of the race were dry and sunny. The air temperature throughout the race was between 85–88 °F (29–31 °C) and the track temperature ranged from 112–121 °F (44–49 °C). Emerson Fittipaldi, a two-time Formula One World Champion, commanded the drivers to start their engines. The race began at 1:37 p.m. BRT (UTC+03:00). Immediately, the first caution of the race was shown because Tagliani moved too far away from Montoya as every other car went across the start/finish line. Concurrently, Servià lost control of his car leaving turn four, and hit the inside tire barrier at the start of the main straightaway, retiring instantly. Green flag racing got under way on the fifth lap with Tagliani leading Montoya and Tracy. Bräck steered left to pass Tracy for third position at turn three 17 laps later. However, he could not retain the position as Tracy retook the place at the next corner, but Bräck made his original manoeuvre stick on the main straightaway. Fontana was deemed by race control to have overtaken Fernández before the start/finish line on the lap five start. He was given a black flag on lap 17 which ordered him to serve a drive-through penalty. On the 23rd lap, Castroneves retired in the pit lane because of a gearbox problem rendering him unable to downshift.

Montoya retired with a broken shifter cable on lap 30. Green flag pit stops for fuel and tires began on lap 33, when Tagliani and Bräck entered pit road, handing the lead to Tracy. Vasser assumed the lead when Tracy made his pit stop four laps later. Franchitti damaged his car when he slid backwards into the pit wall, and sustained light damage to the right-front wing endplate. Fernández led on laps 38 and 39 before he entered pit road for his first stop. After the pit stops, Tagliani retook the lead. On lap 55, Herta stalled at the bottom of the track between the first and second turns, prompting the second caution. Herta retired when he could not restart his car. All of the cars on the lead lap except for Tagliani made pit stops under caution. Racing was due to continue on lap 60, but the yellow flags were again needed when Garcia delayed the field, enabling Tagliani to get too far away from all other drivers. The race recommenced on the next lap with Tagliani holding first position. On lap 63, ninth-placed Papis cut a tire from contact with another car. He went a lap down during a pit stop for a replacement wheel. Kanaan retired with a mechanical problem six laps later. Andretti took the lead when Tagliani made his pit stop on the 75th lap.

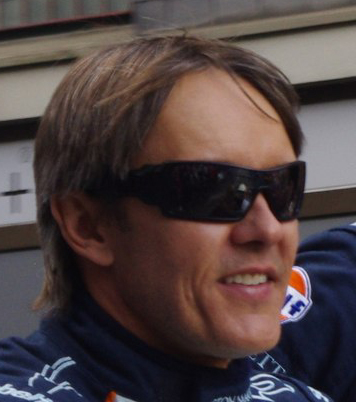
Adrián Fernández (pictured in 2011) took the sixth victory of his career after Tagliani spun on the 100th lap.

Brack took the lead when Andretti entered pit road two laps later. At Andretti's pit stop, crew members Todd Tice and John Littlefield were moving way from the side of his car when Andretti had been instructed to leave his pit stall. This meant the fuelling vent hose Tice attempted to detach was pulled from his grip, and he jumped after it, only to become entangled in Andretti's right-rear wheel, breaking his right ankle and leg. Tice was evaluated on the scene by CART physician Terry Trammell, and was flown to Indianapolis on 1 May for further surgery. Littlefield was not seriously injured with bruising to his left leg. Andretti was penalized for the incident; he incurred a drive-through penalty which he took on the 81st lap. Ten laps later, Bräck's lead of 9.144 seconds was reduced to nothing when the third caution came out for Jourdain who stalled at the bottom of turn two. Jourdain had assistance from course officials in restarting his car. During the caution, several drivers, including Bräck, made pit stops for tires and fuel. Tagliani chose not to make a pit stop, and he led the field back up to speed at the restart on lap 98.

Two laps later, the fourth caution was given. Tagliani lost traction in his car in turn one and spun at the next corner. Franchitti and Andretti scrambled for space to avoid a collision with Tagliani's car only for them to make contact with each other. Although all three drivers, flat-spotted their tires, they elected not to enter the pit lane for new tires or repairs, as safety workers cleared debris on the track. The green flag was waved on lap 105, but it was immediately replaced when Tagliani spun for a second time going into turn four because of heavy wear on his rear tires and stalled. This ended the race under caution, with overtaking forbidden. Fernández thus achieved his first victory of the season, and the sixth of his career. Vasser followed 0.931 seconds later in second, and Tracy finished in third. Off the podium, the Brazilian trio of da Matta, Fittipaldi, Moreno were fourth to sixth. Blundell, Gidley, Andretti, and Bräck, Franchitti and Garcia were the final finishers. There were eight lead changes among five drivers during the course of the race. Tagliani's 76 laps led was the most of any driver. Fernández led twice for a total of 11 laps.

=== Post-race ===
The top three drivers appeared on the podium to collect their trophies and appeared later at a press conference. Fernández said his victory was important since he had not finished a race until that point in the season, "But we kept working on the car, and tried a new set-up for the warm-up. That was pretty good, and it gave me some ideas on some changes to make during the race. I passed some cars early on, but then I got stuck – not stuck, really, but I got behind Cristiano da Matta, who was going very fast, and I couldn't get past him. I was getting frustrated, but in these races you have to be patient and try to think ahead." Vasser said he observed Tagliani spinning in front of him and he chose to swerve right to avoid a collision, "It was basically a 50–50 chance. It was more luck than anything." Third placed Tracy stated his car was running with more downforce than he desired, "I thought the field would be closer than it was but Juan and Alex just took off and I was slower down the straight. But the car was good by the end of the race. I was able to get by traffic and caught up to Jimmy and Adrian and I was really happy with the job the team did."

Tagliani spoke of his race as a positive rather than a negative after he lost the opportunity to achieve his first victory, "I'm very proud of my race, except for my mistake. Until then, it had been a perfect weekend for Player's/Forsythe Racing, and I feel very, very bad for my guys.", and, "I was trying very hard to stay up front, and I tried a little too hard. I ran up into the marbles and tried to bring it back down into a spin, but I didn't make it. I'm very sad in my heart." After 12 days, CART chief steward Kirk Russell annulled four of the points Andretti scored and ordered him to pay his ninth-place prize money earnings of $17,500 back to the series for Andretti violating the CART Rule Book, which states, "Unsafe acts will be penalized." after the injuries sustained by Tice and Littlefield at his second pit stop. Russell stated that Andretti would not be disqualified and there would be no redistribution of his points and prize money, "Given the nature and severity of the incident, we would have excluded the no. 6 car from the remainder of the event. However, the information available at the time of the event did not support the action. We have to make call based on the best information at the time."

The result reduced Tracy's lead in the Drivers' Championship to six points over Vasser. Moreno moved clear of Papis in the early battle for third position, and Fernández's victory advanced him to fifth. Ford Cosworth assumed the Manufacturers' Championship lead with 54 points. Honda fell to second with two less points, Toyota were another ten points adrift in third, Mercedes-Benz were still fourth. In the Constructors' Championship, Reynard's 66 points accumulated meant they continued to top the standings with Lola another twenty points behind in second. Swift maintained its hold on third with seventeen races left in the season. This was the last race to be held in Rio as the planned race for the 2001 season was canceled when the Rio municipal government missed a deadline for guaranteeing payment of sanctioning fees, and failed to grant race promoter Emerson Fittipaldi access to the facility so he could begin to prepare for the race.

=== Race classification ===
Drivers who scored championship points are denoted in bold.

Final race classification
Pos	No	Driver	Team	Laps	Time/retired	Grid	Points
1	**40**	Adrián Fernández (MEX)	**Patrick Racing**	**108**	**1:37.12.490**	**16**	**20**
2	12	Jimmy Vasser (USA)	**Chip Ganassi Racing**	**108**	**+0.931**	**6**	**16**
3	**26**	Paul Tracy (CAN)	**Team Green**	**108**	**+1.338**	**3**	**14**
4	**97**	Cristiano da Matta (BRA)	**PPI Motorsports**	**108**	**+1.581**	**17**	**12**
5	11	Christian Fittipaldi (BRA)	**Newman/Haas Racing**	**108**	**+2.356**	**5**	**10**
6	**20**	Roberto Moreno (BRA)	**Patrick Racing**	**108**	**+3.687**	**12**	**8**
7	**18**	Mark Blundell (GBR)	**PacWest Racing**	**108**	**+5.079**	**23**	**6**
8	**32**	Memo Gidley (USA)	**Forsythe Racing**	**108**	**+6.504**	**11**	**5**
9	**6**	Michael Andretti (USA)	**Newman/Haas Racing**	**107**	**+1 Lap**	**15**	
10	**8**	Kenny Bräck (SWE)	**Team Rahal**	**107**	**+1 Lap**	**4**	**3**
11	**27**	Dario Franchitti (GBR)	**Team Green**	**107**	**+1 Lap**	**8**	**2**
12	**25**	Luiz Garcia Jr. (BRA)	**Arciero Racing**	**104**	**+4 Laps**	**25**	**1**
13	**33**	Alex Tagliani (CAN)	**Forsythe Racing**	**102**	**Crash**	**1**	**2**^{2}
14	34	Gualter Salles (BRA)	Dale Coyne Racing	98	Engine	24	—
15	16	Michel Jourdain Jr. (MEX)	Bettenhausen Racing	90	Oil pressure	22	—
16	7	Max Papis (ITA)	Team Rahal	90	Gearbox	10	—
17	2	Gil de Ferran (BRA)	Team Penske	79	Exhaust	13	—
18	55	Tony Kanaan (BRA)	Mo Nunn Racing	69	Gearbox	9	—
19	19	Takuya Kurosawa (JPN)	Dale Coyne Racing	64	Mechanical	19	—
20	5	Bryan Herta (USA)	Walker Motorsport	54	Gearbox	20	—
21	17	Maurício Gugelmin (BRA)	PacWest Racing	53	Engine	21	—
22	1	Juan Pablo Montoya (COL)	Chip Ganassi Racing	30	Shifter cable	2	—
23	10	Norberto Fontana (ARG)	Della Penna Motorsports	29	Mechanical	18	—
24	3	Hélio Castroneves (BRA)	Team Penske	22	Gearbox	7	—
25	96	Oriol Servià (ESP)	PPI Motorsports	0	Crash	14	—

Notes

- **^2**— Includes one bonus point for leading the most laps.

== Standings after the race ==
Drivers' Championship standings
Rank	+/–	Driver	Points
1		Paul Tracy (CAN)	48
2		Jimmy Vasser (USA)	42 (−6)
3	1	Roberto Moreno (BRA)	28 (−20)
4	1	Max Papis (ITA)	20 (−28)
5	21	Adrián Fernández (MEX)	20 (−28)

Constructors' standings
Rank	+/–	Constructor	Points
1		Reynard (GBR)	66
2		Lola (GBR)	42 (−24)
3		Swift (USA)	0 (−66)

Manufacturers' standings
Rank	+/–	Manufacturer	Points
1	1	Ford Cosworth (UK)	54
2	1	Honda (JPN)	52 (−2)
3		Toyota (JPN)	42 (−12)
4		Mercedes-Benz (DEU)	14 (−40)

- Note: Only the top five positions are included for the drivers' standings.

Previous race: 2000 Toyota Grand Prix of Long Beach	CART FedEx Championship Series; 2000 season	Next race: 2000 Firestone Firehawk 500
Previous race: 1999 Rio 200	Rio 200	Next race: N/A
