= Maciej Steinhof =

Polish racing driver (born 1985)

- Nationality: (Poland) Polish
- Born: 14 November 1985 (age 40) Kraków (Poland)

Volkswagen Scirocco R-Cup career
- Car number: 20

Championship titles
- 2009: ADAC Volkswagen Polo Cup

Maciej Steinhof (born 14 November 1985 in Kraków) is a Polish racing driver. He won the ADAC Volkswagen Polo Cup series in 2009.
