= Jacques Schulz =

German television presenter and journalist

- Born: Jacques Arno Schulz; 1 April 1967 (age 59); Heidelberg, West Germany
- Occupations: Commentator journalist
- Years active: 1993–present
- Employer(s): DF1; Sky Deutschland

Jacques Arno Schulz (born 1 April 1967) is a German sports commentator and journalist who commentated on Formula One in Germany between 1996 and 2012.

== Formula One ==
In 1993, Schulz began his Formula One commentating career by commentating races for Eurosport in Germany, and moved to the German channel DF1 for 1996, pairing with Swiss Formula One driver Marc Surer. His first Formula One commentary was at the 1996 German Grand Prix and his last was the 2012 Brazilian Grand Prix, coinciding with Michael Schumacher's final race. In February 2013, he announced his withdrawal from commentating for personal reasons. He was replaced by Sascha Roos.

== After Formula One ==
Two months later after his withdrawal, Schulz went on to commentate for the German ADAC GT Masters alongside Patrick Simon.

== Other sports commentaries ==
In 2006 and 2007, Schulz commentated live broadcasts of the races of the NASCAR Nextel Cup, which were also shown at Premiere. Experts Klaus Graf and Christian Kuhn were his co-commentators.

In 2008, Schulz also commentated on individual races of the NASCAR Sprint Cup races, as well as on the Formula 1 free weekends, as well as the IndyCar Series. In the winter of 2009/10, he also occasionally commentated ice hockey games for Sky Deutschland.

In 2011, Schulz commentated on the Race of Champions from Düsseldorf on Sat.1.
