= Aditya Patel =

Indian racing driver

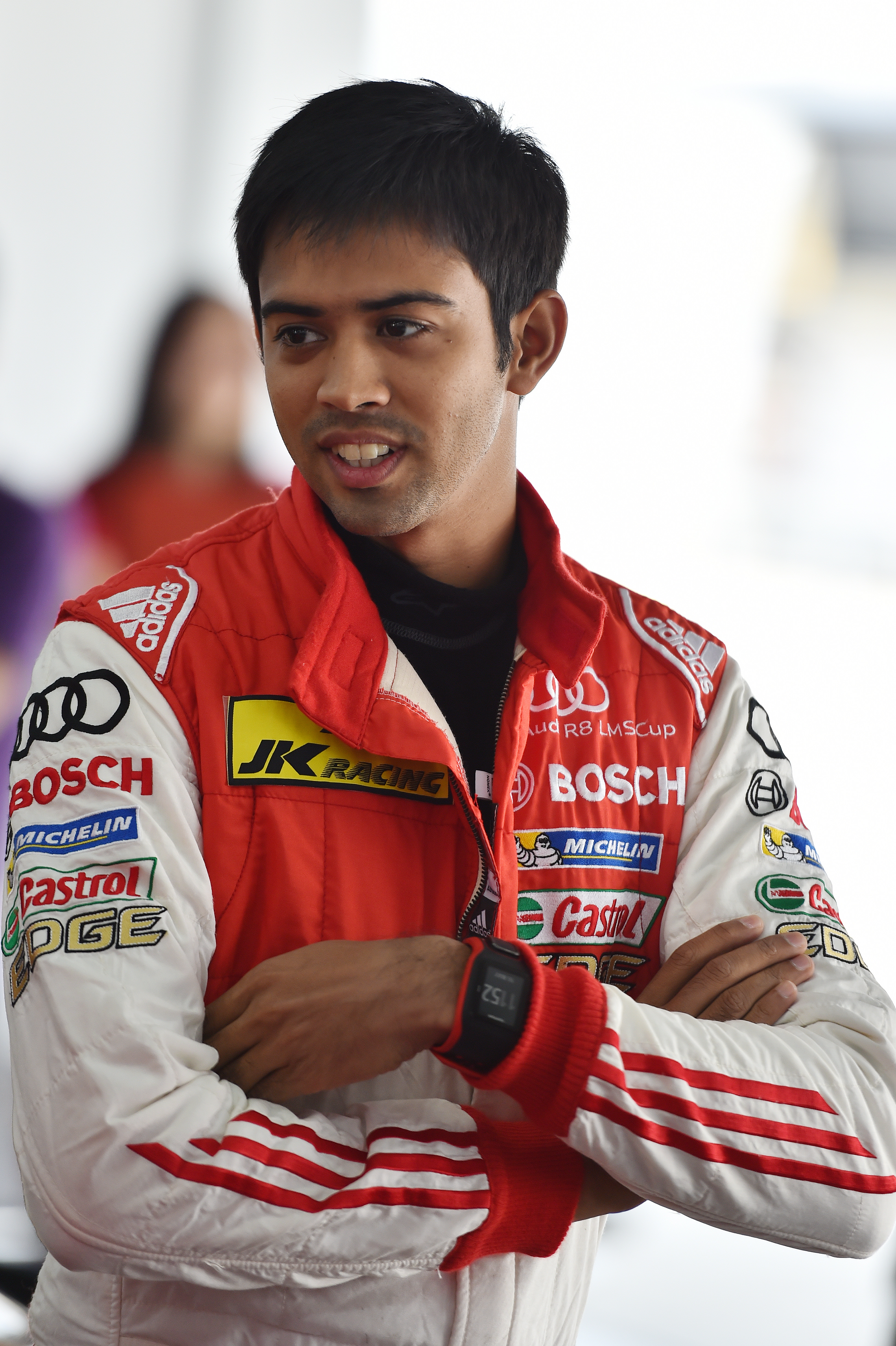
- Patel in 2015
- Nationality: (India) Indian
- Born: 8 July 1988 (age 38) Chennai, India
- Categorisation: FIA Silver

Aditya Patel (born 8 July 1988) is an Indian racing driver who has competed in the Volkswagen Scirocco R-Cup, Polo Cup, Formula BMW Pacific and the 24 Hours of Nürburgring.

Patel's international career began with a bang, notching up a third-place finish on his debut in the Formula BMW Pacific Championship in 2008. After a year of racing in Asia, Patel was given an offer to race in the Volkswagen Polo cup in Germany, which he accepted due to budget constraints in Single Seater racing. From there on, he continued to race in tin-tops in the Scirocco R Cup in Germany with two wins and two podium finishes to his name.

In 2012, Patel raced the 24 hours of Nurburgring in an Audi TT for Pro Handicap ev (with teammates Oliver Rudolf and Wolfgang Muller) and won in the SP4T category. He was then given a drive in the JK Racing Asia series where he notched up four podium finishes and a win, becoming the first Indian to climb on the podium and win an International event at the Buddh International Circuit.

Patel participated in the ADAC GT Masters series in Germany with Team MS Racing in an Audi R8 LMS. He was joined in the car by Daniel Dobistch who has been racing in the series for three years now. Together, they made considerable progress and had a few top-ten finishes over a span of 16 races in eight weekends.

In 2014, Patel raced with Team Novadriver alongside teammate, Cesar Campanico in the International GT Open Series. The duo finished on the podium a total of five times through the year, and stood sixth overall in the GT3 Pro-Am category.

2015 saw Patel make a move into the Asian motorsport scene by entering the Audi R8 LMS Cup with team Audi China. After a successful beginning to the season, Patel capped off the season with a win in the final race and ended fourth in the overall standings.

Patel participated in the Audi R8 LMS Cup once again in 2016 with team Audi China, finishing sixth in the overall driver's standings.

== Blancpain GT Series Asia ==
Patel's foray into the Blancpain GT Series Asia began with a commanding win at the Sepang International circuit. Partnering Malaysian driver, Mitch Gilbert, Patel put in a string of performances finishing on the podium eight times out of twelve races in 2017 which included three wins. A huge tyre blowout saw a sure win being snatched away from them at the third round of the championship in Suzuka. The duo then fought back over the course of the season, but lost the driver's championship to Hunter Abbott by a single point.

== Indian Racing League ==
In 2019, with fellow Indian driver, Armaan Ebrahim, Patel created the X1 Racing, the world's first professional franchise-based motorsport league. In 2021, Patel and Ebrahim, along with their partners at RPPL, launched the Formula Regional Indian Championship as well as the F4 Indian Championship that would run along the all new Indian Racing League in 2022 across four cities over five weekends.

== See also ==
- Amanpreet Ahluwalia
