= Volkswagen Scirocco R-Cup =

One-make Volkswagen racing championship.

- Category: One-make racing by Volkswagen
- Country: Germany
- Inaugural season: 2004
- Folded: 2014
- Drivers: 24
- Constructors: Volkswagen
- Engine suppliers: Volkswagen
- Tyre suppliers: Dunlop
- Last Drivers' champion: (South Africa) Jordan Pepper
- Official website: volkswagen-motorsport.com

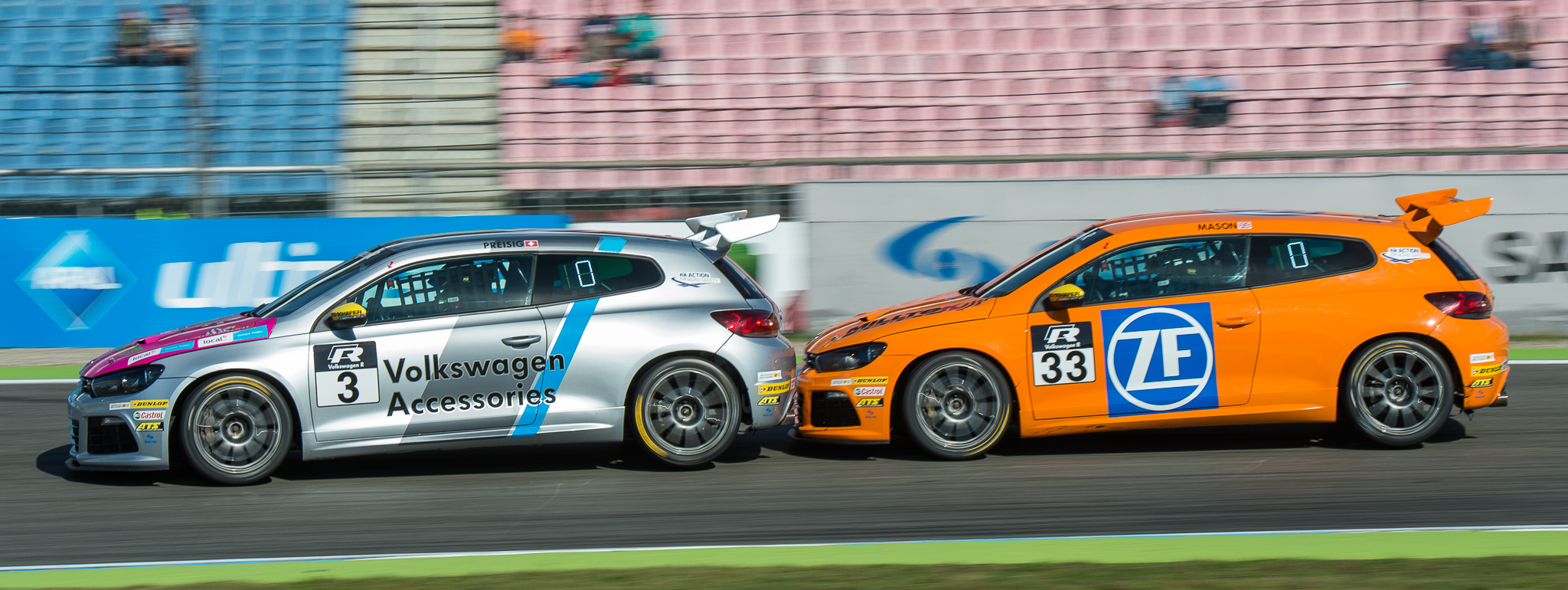
Two Volkswagen Scirocco R-Cup at Hockenheim in 2014

Volkswagen Scirocco R-Cup was a one-make racing series by Volkswagen based in Germany, which used the Volkswagen Scirocco model. The first season was in 2010, having replaced the previous ADAC Volkswagen Polo Cup which had run since 2004. It was a support series for the Deutsche Tourenwagen Masters, and was replaced in 2015 by the Audi Sport TT Cup.

== Specifications ==
- Engine displacement: 1,984 cc (121 cu in) DOHC inline-4
- Gearbox: Production-based 6-speed paddle shift gearbox
- Weight: 1,210 kg (2,668 lb)
- Power output: 173 kW (232 hp)
- Fuel: Aral Ultimate Racing 102 RON unleaded
- Fuel capacity: Undisclosed
- Fuel delivery: Natural gas multi-point injection
- Aspiration: Single-turbocharged
- Length: 4,256 mm (168 in)
- Width: 1,810 mm (71 in)
- Wheelbase: 1,380 mm (54 in)
- Steering: Electromechanically supported rack and pinion steering

== Drivers ==
A number of well-established drivers have passed through this series. These include World Touring Car Championship drivers Jaap van Lagen, Marin Colak and Jason Watt, ex-Champ Car driver Jan Heylen, 1986 Deutsche Tourenwagen Meisterschaft champion Kurt Thiim, 2005 champion René Rast, and 2009 Dakar Rally winner Giniel de Villiers. In 2010, "legend drivers" are going to be competing. So far, ex-Formula One regulars Martin Brundle and Jacques Laffite, the 1990 and 1992 World Rally Champion Carlos Sainz and five-time 24 Hours of Le Mans winner Frank Biela have all made appearances.

== Scoring system ==
- In 2010, points were awarded to the top twenty race finishers. No points were awarded for pole position or fastest race laps. Half-points of the values listed below were awarded for the first two races of the 2010 season. All results count towards the championship.

Position	1st	2nd	3rd	4th	5th	6th	7th	8th	9th	10th	11th	12th	13th	14th	15th	16th	17th	18th	19th	20th
Points	60	48	40	34	32	30	28	26	24	22	20	18	16	14	12	10	8	6	4	2

== Champions ==
Season	Series Name	Champion
2004	ADAC Volkswagen Polo Cup	(Germany) Matthias Meyer
2005	ADAC Volkswagen Polo Cup	(Germany) René Rast
2006	ADAC Volkswagen Polo Cup	(Sweden) Jimmy Johansson
2007	ADAC Volkswagen Polo Cup	(Germany) Constantin Dressler
2008	ADAC Volkswagen Polo Cup	(Germany) Alexander Rambow
2009	ADAC Volkswagen Polo Cup	(Poland) Maciek Steinhof
2010	Volkswagen Scirocco R-Cup	(Germany) Kris Heidorn
2011	Volkswagen Scirocco R-Cup	(Poland) Mateusz Lisowski
2012	Volkswagen Scirocco R-Cup	(Sweden) Ola Nilsson
2013	Volkswagen Scirocco R-Cup	(South Africa) Kelvin van der Linde
2014	Volkswagen Scirocco R-Cup	(South Africa) Jordan Pepper
