= Sauber C12 =

Formula One racing car

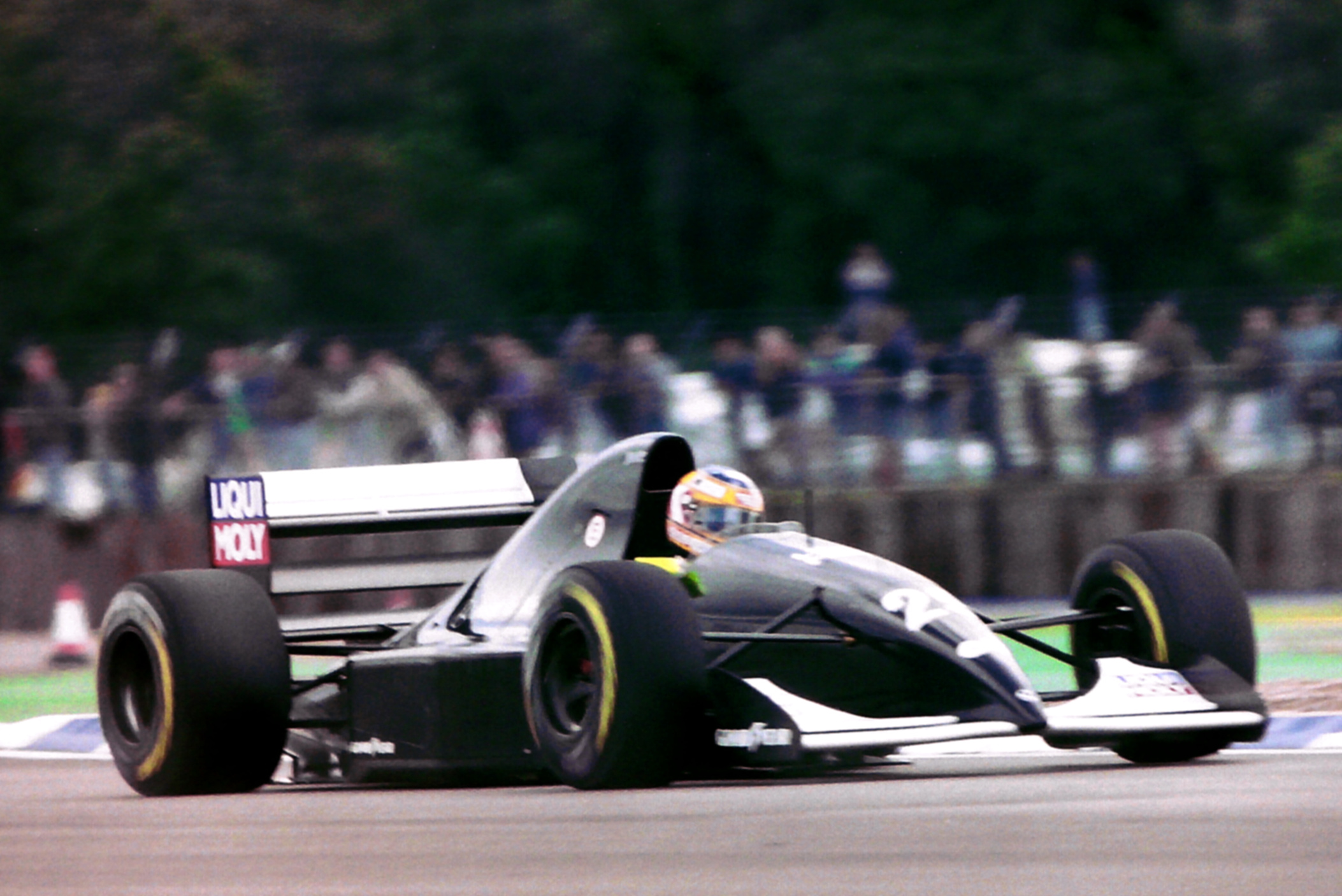
- Karl Wendlinger driving the C12 at Silverstone.
- Category: Formula One
- Constructor: Sauber
- Designers: Harvey Postlethwaite (Technical Director); Leo Ress (Chief Designer); Mike Gascoyne (Head of Aerodynamics); Mario Illien (Chief Engine Designer, Ilmor)
- Successor: Sauber C13

Technical specifications
- Chassis: Carbon fibre monocoque
- Suspension (front): Double wishbones, pushrod
- Suspension (rear): Double wishbones, pushrod
- Axle track: Front: 1,690 mm (67 in); Rear: 1,610 mm (63 in)
- Wheelbase: 2,930 mm (115 in)
- Engine: Ilmor 2175A, 3,496 cc (213.3 cu in), 75° V10, NA, mid-engine, longitudinally mounted
- Transmission: Sauber / XTrac T 6-speed semi-automatic
- Weight: 505 kg (1,113 lb)
- Fuel: Elf
- Lubricants: Liqui Moly
- Tyres: Goodyear

Competition history
- Notable entrants: Team Sauber Formula 1
- Notable drivers: 29. (Austria) Karl Wendlinger; 30. (Finland) JJ Lehto
- Debut: 1993 South African Grand Prix
- Last event: 1993 Australian Grand Prix
| Races | Wins | Poles | F/Laps |
|---|---|---|---|
| 16 | 0 | 0 | 0 |
- Constructors' Championships: 0
- Drivers' Championships: 0

The Sauber C12 was the car with which the Sauber Formula One team made its FIA Formula One World Championship debut in 1993. Its design was led by Leo Ress.

== Overview ==
=== Engine ===
Power was provided by a Sauber-branded 3.5-litre V10 built by Ilmor in partnership with Mercedes. The C12 was given the prominence of "Concept by Mercedes-Benz" stickers on the engine cowling due to the two parties' close relationship from their World Sportscar Championship program. The engines were re-branded in 1994 to reflect the partnership.

=== Drivers ===
Karl Wendlinger was re-united with his former WSC team in preparation for its Grand Prix debut. He already had two seasons of Formula One experience, having made his debut in the 1991 Japanese Grand Prix with Leyton House, while JJ Lehto (Jyrki Järvilehto) had started 38 Grands Prix (not including failures to qualify) between 1989 and 1992.

== Racing history ==
Lehto contributed to a promising start with a 5th-place finish in the South African GP at Kyalami and improved on that with a 4th place classification at Imola, home of the San Marino GP, despite an engine problem.

The C12 had a somewhat mixed record with a total of 12 DNFs due to mechanical failure, including seven engine failures (not including Imola, where Lehto was classified as a finisher). Driver-related incidents accounted for six more DNFs.

The C12 achieved six points finishes and eight non-scoring finishes from 32 starts. It achieved a points total of 12 and 7th place in the Constructors' World Championship standings.

It was replaced at the start of the 1994 season by the Sauber C13.

== Livery ==
The C12 sported a black livery, reminiscent of the C9 Group C prototype sportscar from 1987.

== Complete Formula One results ==
(key) (results in bold indicate pole position)

| Year | Team | Engine | Tyres | Drivers | 1 | 2 | 3 | 4 | 5 | 6 | 7 | 8 | 9 | 10 | 11 | 12 | 13 | 14 | 15 | 16 | Points | WCC |
|---|---|---|---|---|---|---|---|---|---|---|---|---|---|---|---|---|---|---|---|---|---|---|
| 1993 | Team Sauber Formula 1 | SauberV10 | **G** | | RSA | BRA | EUR | SMR | ESP | MON | CAN | FRA | GBR | GER | HUN | BEL | ITA | POR | JPN | AUS | **12** | **7th** |
| 1993 | Team Sauber Formula 1 | SauberV10 | **G** | (Austria) Karl Wendlinger | Ret | Ret | Ret | Ret | Ret | 13 | 6 | Ret | Ret | 9 | 6 | Ret | 4 | 5 | Ret | 15 | **12** | **7th** |
| 1993 | Team Sauber Formula 1 | SauberV10 | **G** | (Finland) JJ Lehto | 5 | Ret | Ret | 4 | Ret | Ret | 7 | Ret | 8 | Ret | Ret | 9 | Ret | 7 | 8 | Ret | **12** | **7th** |
