= Sauber C13 =

Formula One racing car

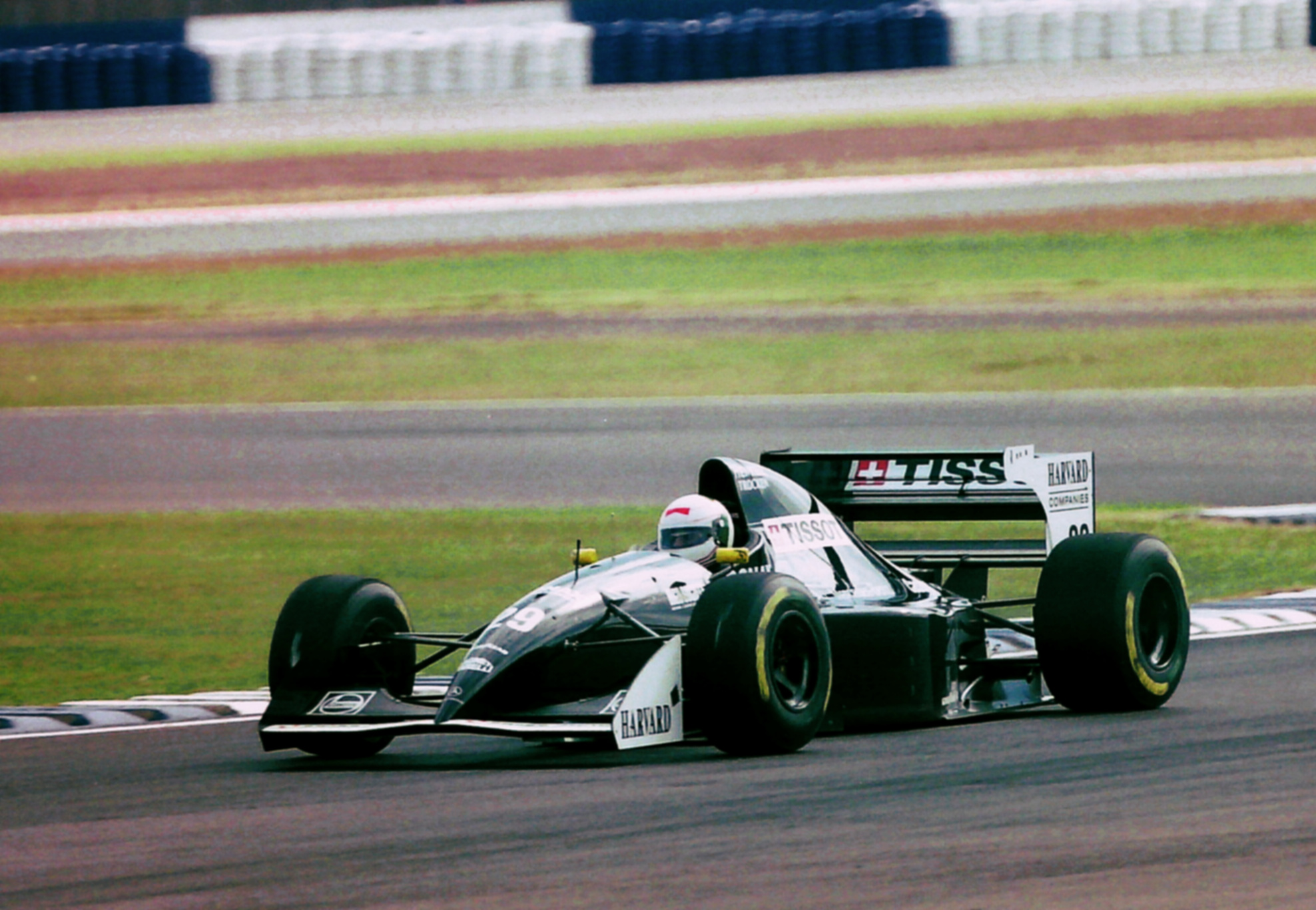
- Andrea de Cesaris driving the Sauber C13 at Silverstone during the 1994 British Grand Prix.
- Category: Formula One
- Constructor: Sauber
- Designers: André de Cortanze (Technical Director); Leo Ress (Chief Designer); Heinz Zoellner (Head of Aerodynamics); Mario Illien (Chief Engine Designer, Ilmor)
- Predecessor: Sauber C12
- Successor: Sauber C14

Technical specifications
- Chassis: Carbon fibre monocoque
- Engine: Mercedes-Benz 2175B, 3,496 cc (213.3 cu in), 75° V10, NA, mid-engine, longitudinally mounted
- Transmission: Sauber / XTrac T 6-speed semi-automatic
- Power: 720–755 hp (536.9–563.0 kW) @ 14,000 rpm
- Fuel: Castrol
- Tyres: Goodyear

Competition history
- Notable entrants: Broker Sauber Mercedes (Rounds 1-6); Sauber Mercedes (Rounds 7-16)
- Notable drivers: 29. (Austria) Karl Wendlinger; 29. (Italy) Andrea de Cesaris; 29. (Finland) JJ Lehto; 30. (Germany) Heinz-Harald Frentzen
- Debut: 1994 Brazilian Grand Prix
- Last event: 1994 Australian Grand Prix
Races	Wins	Podiums	Poles	F/Laps
16	0	0	0	0
- Constructors' Championships: 0
- Drivers' Championships: 0

The Sauber C13 was a Formula One car designed by André de Cortanze and Leo Ress for use by the Sauber team in the 1994 Formula One World Championship.

== Overview ==
=== Engine ===
The car was powered by an Ilmor 3.5L V10 engine badged as a Mercedes-Benz. The development of this car signalled Mercedes-Benz's return to Formula One, providing their first engine for an F1 car since 1955.

=== Drivers ===
Drivers for the team throughout the season were Karl Wendlinger, Andrea de Cesaris, JJ Lehto and Heinz-Harald Frentzen. Only Frentzen drove for the entire season.

== Racing history ==
From the Spanish Grand Prix, the car ran with higher cockpit sides after Wendlinger suffered severe injuries in a side-on accident during qualifying at the Monaco Grand Prix which left him in a coma. Higher cockpit sides were later made mandatory for all cars in the 1996 season, and were still in use up to 2017, when they were integrated with the "halo" system.

The C13 was replaced for the 1995 season by the Sauber C14.

== Sponsorship and livery ==
Broker served as the team's main sponsor until the French Grand Prix, when Tissot replaced them on the car. By the German Grand Prix, the dots and an image of the wristwatch were added for remainder of the season.

At the Canadian Grand Prix, the sidepods of de Cesaris' car featured "Forza Andrea" ("Go Andrea"), "200 Gran Premi" ("200 Grands Prix") and "In bocca al lupo!" ("Good luck!"), marking his 200th race start.

== Race results ==
(key)

Year	Entrant	Engine	Tyres	Drivers	1	2	3	4	5	6	7	8	9	10	11	12	13	14	15	16	Points	WCC
1994	Broker Sauber Mercedes (Rounds 1-6); Sauber Mercedes (Rounds 7-16)	Mercedes-Benz 2175B 3.5 V10	G		BRA	PAC	SMR	MON	ESP	CAN	FRA	GBR	GER	HUN	BEL	ITA	POR	EUR	JPN	AUS	12	8th
1994	Broker Sauber Mercedes (Rounds 1-6); Sauber Mercedes (Rounds 7-16)	Mercedes-Benz 2175B 3.5 V10	G	(Austria) Karl Wendlinger	6	Ret	4	DNS													12	8th
1994	Broker Sauber Mercedes (Rounds 1-6); Sauber Mercedes (Rounds 7-16)	Mercedes-Benz 2175B 3.5 V10	G	(Italy) Andrea de Cesaris						Ret	6	Ret	Ret	Ret	Ret	Ret	Ret	Ret			12	8th
1994	Broker Sauber Mercedes (Rounds 1-6); Sauber Mercedes (Rounds 7-16)	Mercedes-Benz 2175B 3.5 V10	G	(Finland) JJ Lehto															Ret	10	12	8th
1994	Broker Sauber Mercedes (Rounds 1-6); Sauber Mercedes (Rounds 7-16)	Mercedes-Benz 2175B 3.5 V10	G	(Germany) Heinz-Harald Frentzen	Ret	5	7	WD	Ret	Ret	4	7	Ret	Ret	Ret	Ret	Ret	6	6	7	12	8th
