= Sauber C14 =

Formula One racing car

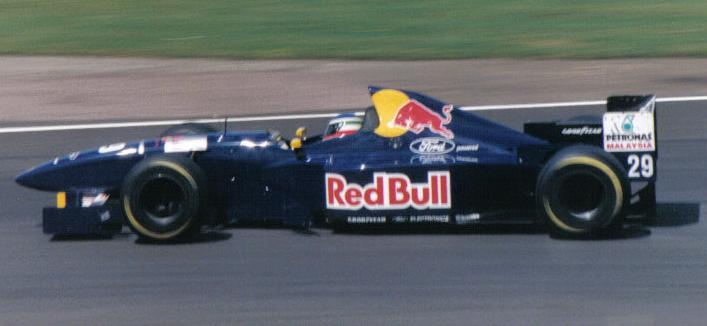
- Jean-Christophe Boullion driving the C14 at the 1995 British Grand Prix
- Category: Formula One
- Constructor: Sauber
- Designers: André de Cortanze (Technical Director); Leo Ress (Chief Designer); Heinz Zoellner (Head of Aerodynamics); Geoff Goddard (Chief Engine Designer, Ford Cosworth)
- Predecessor: Sauber C13
- Successor: Sauber C15

Technical specifications
- Chassis: Carbon fibre monocoque
- Suspension (front): Double wishbones, pushrod
- Suspension (rear): As front
- Axle track: Front: 1,680 mm (66.1 in); Rear: 1,610 mm (63.4 in)
- Wheelbase: 2,920 mm (115.0 in)
- Engine: Ford ECA Zetec-R, 2,999 cc (183.0 cu in), 90° V8, NA, mid-engine, longitudinally mounted
- Transmission: Sauber / XTrac transverse 6-speed semi-automatic
- Power: 600–630 hp (447.4–469.8 kW) @ 14,000 rpm
- Weight: 595 kg (1,311.8 lb) (including driver)
- Fuel: Castrol (Note: Petronas branding appeared on C14, but the car used Castrol fuels and lubricants.)
- Tyres: Goodyear

Competition history
- Notable entrants: Red Bull Sauber Ford
- Notable drivers: 29. (Austria) Karl Wendlinger; 29. (France) Jean-Christophe Boullion; 30. (Germany) Heinz-Harald Frentzen
- Debut: 1995 Brazilian Grand Prix
- Last event: 1995 Australian Grand Prix
Races	Wins	Podiums	Poles	F/Laps
17	0	1	0	0
- Constructors' Championships: 0
- Drivers' Championships: 0

The Sauber C14 was the Formula One car with which the Sauber team competed in the 1995 Formula One World Championship. The number 29 seat was initially taken by Austrian driver Karl Wendlinger, while the number 30 seat was taken by Germany's Heinz-Harald Frentzen. However, Wendlinger underperformed and was replaced by Frenchman Jean-Christophe Boullion for most of the remainder of the year. The team's test driver was Argentine Norberto Fontana.

The C14 was the only V8 powered Sauber F1 car until the BMW Sauber F1.06 in 2006 and also the last Hinwil-based car to utilize Castrol-branded lubricant products until the Audi R26 in the 2026 season.

== Overview ==
The car was launched and raced in the season's early races with a distinctive narrow and drooping nose. At the San Marino GP, this was replaced by a more conventional raised nose carrying the front wing underneath on twin supports. Thus the car became a largely unremarkable mid-1990s F1 midfielder, although it was notable for being the only 1995 F1 car to feature the raised cockpit sides which would be mandated from 1996, and for achieving Sauber's first F1 podium finish with Frentzen 3rd in Italy.

== Livery ==
The C14 featured a dark navy blue livery with a main sponsorship from the Austrian energy drink brand Red Bull. Despite running on Castrol fuels and lubricants, Petronas was only the team sponsorship and would utilize fuels and lubricants from the 1996 season onwards. It was added on the rear wing from the Monaco Grand Prix.

== Complete Formula One results ==
(key)

Year	Team	Engine	Tyres	Drivers	1	2	3	4	5	6	7	8	9	10	11	12	13	14	15	16	17	Pts.	WCC
1995	Red Bull Sauber Ford	Ford ECA Zetec-R; V8	G		BRA	ARG	SMR	ESP	MON	CAN	FRA	GBR	GER	HUN	BEL	ITA	POR	EUR	PAC	JPN	AUS	18	7th
1995	Red Bull Sauber Ford	Ford ECA Zetec-R; V8	G	(Austria) Karl Wendlinger	Ret	Ret	Ret	13												10	Ret	18	7th
1995	Red Bull Sauber Ford	Ford ECA Zetec-R; V8	G	(France) Jean-Christophe Boullion					8	Ret	Ret	9	5	10	11	6	12	Ret	Ret			18	7th
1995	Red Bull Sauber Ford	Ford ECA Zetec-R; V8	G	(Germany) Heinz-Harald Frentzen	Ret	5	6	8	6	Ret	10	6	Ret	5	4	3	6	Ret	7	8	Ret	18	7th
