= Karl Wendlinger =

Austrian racing driver (born 1968)

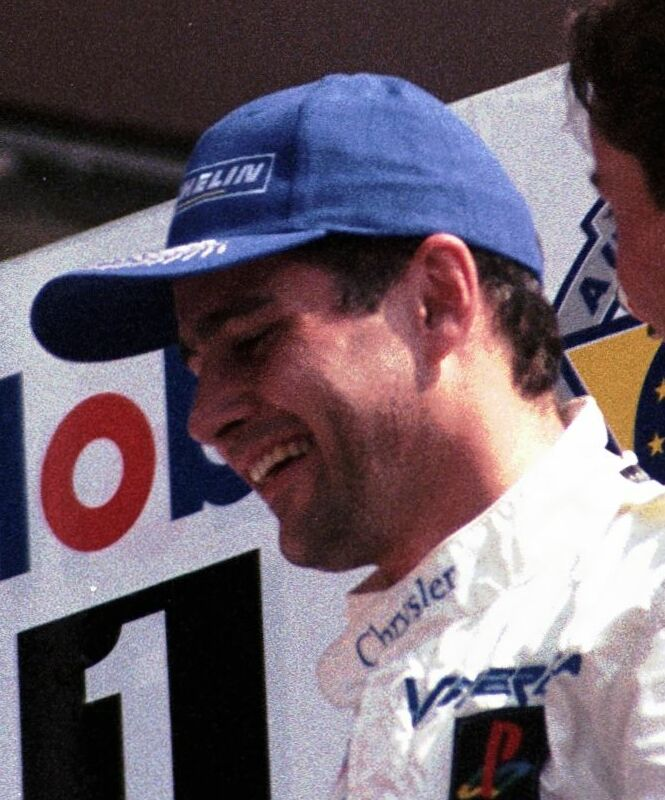
- Wendlinger in 1999
- Born: 20 December 1968 (age 57) Kufstein, Austria
Karl Wendlinger
Formula One World Championship career
- Nationality: (Austria) Austrian
- Active years: 1991–1995
- Team(s): Leyton House, March, Sauber
- Entries: 42 (41 starts)
- Championships: 0
- Wins: 0
- Podiums: 0
- Career points: 14
- Pole positions: 0
- Fastest laps: 0
- First entry: 1991 Japanese Grand Prix
- Last entry: 1995 Australian Grand Prix

FIA GT1 World Championship career
- Debut season: 2010
- Current team: Swiss Racing Team
- Categorisation: FIA Platinum (until 2016); FIA Gold (2017–)
- Car number: 3
- Starts: 20
- Wins: 0
- Poles: 0
- Fastest laps: 0
- Best finish: 43rd in 2010
24 Hours of Le Mans career
- Years: 1991–1992, 1996–2001, 2008
- Teams: Team Sauber Mercedes, Peugeot Talbot Sport, Porsche AG, Roock Racing, Viper Team Oreca
- Best finish: 3rd (1996)
- Class wins: 2 (1999 and 2000)

Previous series
- 2004–09 2002–03 2001 1999 1998–99 1997 1996 1991–95 1990–91 1990–92 1989–90 1988–89 1988: FIA GT Championship; DTM; V8Star Series; American Le Mans Series; FIA GT Championship; Italian Superturismo; Super Tourenwagen Cup; Formula One; International Formula 3000; World Sportscars; DTM; German F3; Austrian F3

Championship titles
- 1999 1989 1988: FIA GT Championship; German F3; Austrian F3

Karl Wendlinger (German pronunciation: [kaʁl ˈvɛndlɪŋɐ]; born 20 December 1968) is an Austrian professional racing and former Formula One driver.

== Mercedes Juniors ==
Born in Kufstein, Wendlinger started his career in karting and in Formula Ford before entering the German Formula 3 Championship in 1988. After managing tenth place in that inaugural season, Wendlinger won the crown in 1989, which earned him also a drive in the Mercedes-Benz sportscar team for 1990.

Driving the Sauber-Mercedes C11 – alongside Michael Schumacher, Heinz-Harald Frentzen, Mauro Baldi and Jean-Louis Schlesser – the quintet managed to achieve fifth place in the 1990 World Sportscar Championship standings.

In 1991, Wendlinger continued to race with Mercedes sportscars — alongside a Formula 3000 programme with the Helmut Marko team. Towards the end of the year, Mercedes's team boss Jochen Neerpasch placed two of his protégés in Formula One. Schumacher went to the Jordan team before signing for Benetton, whilst Wendlinger made a low key Formula One debut with the Leyton House outfit for the final two Grands Prix of the season.

== Formula One ==
=== 1991–1992: Leyton House/March ===
Wendlinger's Formula One debut came at the 1991 Japanese Grand Prix at Suzuka, bringing some money to the beleaguered Leyton House team in place of long-serving Ivan Capelli. He qualified in 22nd place in a field of 26, but was unable to convert that into anything more, after he retired due to a big collision at turn one, between himself, JJ Lehto, Andrea de Cesaris and Emanuele Pirro. His second race didn't fare much better as the Adelaide circuit was a wash-out, torrential rain leading to a curtailed event. Wendlinger was classified in 20th place, two laps down on eventual winner Ayrton Senna, after aquaplaning on some of the huge puddles of water present that day.

Wendlinger was kept at the renamed March team in 1992, alongside Paul Belmondo. The team were struggling financially due to the withdrawal of the Leyton House organisation, the only modifications to the 1991 car being reworking the cockpit to accommodate Wendlinger's tall frame. The results were very encouraging, including starting seventh at the opening South African Grand Prix but results were limited by the team's financial restraints. For example, at the Spanish Grand Prix the drying track at the start saw the Footwork team make a late change of tyres to their cars on the starting grid, incurring a fine but finishing fifth and seventh. Wendlinger was eighth, March being unable to afford the fine for changing his tyres at the same time. However, at the Canadian Grand Prix in Montreal, a race of attrition allowed Wendlinger to bring the car home in fourth position, albeit a lap down — but nonetheless a huge result considering the financial troubles his team were in. These three points allowed Wendlinger to finish 12th in the Drivers' Championship ahead of respected names such as Ivan Capelli, Thierry Boutsen, Johnny Herbert and former Brabham and Tyrrell driver Stefano Modena.

=== 1993–1995: Sauber ===
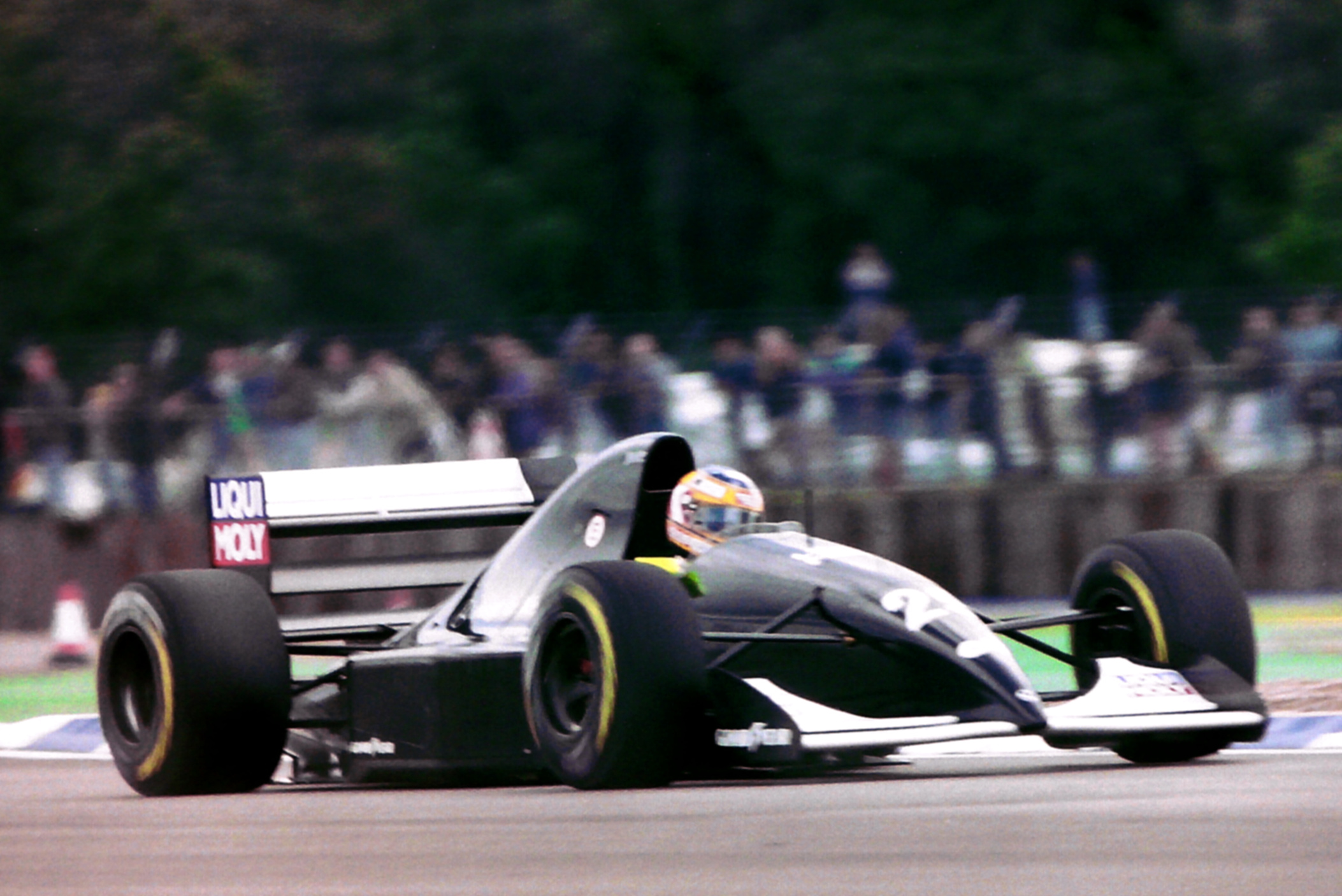
Wendlinger driving for Sauber at the 1993 British Grand Prix.

For 1993, Wendlinger was re-united with Peter Sauber, who that year had become a Formula One team owner. Much was expected of the team and early on Wendlinger and teammate JJ Lehto mixed with the front runners. Initially, he was out-paced by Lehto, who scored points in two of the first four races, though some of this was down to bad luck; Wendlinger had qualified fifth at Donington for example, only to be eliminated by Michael Andretti on the first lap. At the Monaco Grand Prix, Wendlinger and Lehto collided, the team blaming Lehto. After that, Wendlinger's results improved. He scored his first point of the season in the next round and added three more points scores — the best being fourth at the Italian Grand Prix after a long battle with Andretti. Other points finishes in Portugal and Hungary helped give Wendlinger 12th in the Drivers' Championship again with seven points — two points and a place ahead of the more experienced Lehto.

For 1994, Wendlinger was retained as Mercedes made their official return to Formula One, buying a stake in Ilmor and becoming the team's engine supplier. Heinz-Harald Frentzen arrived in place of Lehto. The season started well for Wendlinger: He scored a point in the first race of the year at Interlagos and drove to fourth place in the San Marino race, an event marred by the deaths of both Wendlinger's countryman Roland Ratzenberger and the three-time world champion Ayrton Senna.

The next race was in Monaco for the fourth round of the Championship. During the first practice session, Wendlinger exited the tunnel and lost control of the car under braking for the Nouvelle Chicane. The Sauber, sliding sideways, hit a barrier with considerable force; the barrier was protected by large plastic containers that were supposed to be filled with water but were not. Although his vital signs were quickly stabilized, he remained in a coma for several weeks and did not drive in a race for the rest of the year. He had planned to make his comeback at the Japanese Grand Prix, but pre-race testing revealed his neck was not strong enough.

Wendlinger recovered from his injuries before the start of the 1995 Formula One season, where he would be driving at Sauber (now with Ford engines) alongside Frentzen. However, he performed poorly and was reluctantly replaced in the team before the Monaco Grand Prix, a year on from the accident, by Jean-Christophe Boullion. Peter Sauber then recalled Wendlinger for the final two races of the season in one last attempt to regain his pre-accident form, without success. Wendlinger later recounted that he had admitted to himself that his Monaco crash had left him unable to "withstand the stresses and strains of Formula One".

== After Formula One ==
Since then, Wendlinger has competed successfully in sports cars and touring cars, winning the FIA GT Championship (with Olivier Beretta) in 1999. After a spell racing for Abt-Audi in DTM in 2002 and 2005, he raced for JMB Racing in FIA GT again, driving a Maserati MC12 with Andrea Bertolini.

Since 2006, Wendlinger has been part of the JetAlliance Racing team, competing again in the FIA GT Championship. His teammate in 2006 was Phillip Peter, and in 2007 his teammate was Scottish driver, Ryan Sharp.

In 2007, Wendlinger competed at the 24 Hours of Daytona with Sigal Sport team in a BMW powered Riley DP. He crashed during the night on his in lap at the end of his second stint and was sent to the hospital as a precaution. The car eventually was retired from the damage.

=== 2008 ===
Wendlinger competed for JetAlliance Racing in 2008 alongside Ryan Sharp. They started well at the RAC Tourist Trophy round from Silverstone. Wendlinger and Sharp won the GT1 class and overall race ahead of Michael Bartels and Andrea Bertolini's Maserati MC12.

== Personal life ==
Wendlinger is married and has two children. His son Jonas Wendlinger is a professional footballer who plays as a goalkeeper for Dutch side Almere City FC.

== Racing record ==
=== Career summary ===
Season	Series	Team	Races	Wins	Poles	F/Laps	Podiums	Points	Position
1987	German Formula Ford 1600		?	?	?	?	?	208	7th
1987	European Formula Ford 1600		?	?	?	?	?	8	15th
1988	Austrian Formula Three Championship	Krafft Walzen Team	?	?	?	?	?	?	**1st**
1988	German Formula Three Championship	Krafft Walzen Team	11	0	0	0	0	69	11th
1988	Macau Grand Prix	Krafft Walzen Team	1	0	0	0	0	N/A	DNF
1989	Deutsche Tourenwagen Meisterschaft	Star-Marko RSM	16	0	0	0	0	20	30th
1989	German Formula Three Championship	Krafft Walzen Team Marko RSM	11	2	1	2	5	164	**1st**
1989	Macau Grand Prix	Krafft Walzen Team Marko RSM	1	0	0	0	0	N/A	DNF
1990	International Formula 3000	RSM Marko	6	0	0	0	0	2	19th
1990	Deutsche Tourenwagen Meisterschaft	AMG Motorenbau GmbH	5	0	0	0	0	0	NC
1990	World Sportscar Championship	Team Sauber Mercedes	4	1	0	0	3	21	5th
1991	World Sportscar Championship	Team Sauber Mercedes	5	1	1	0	2	43	9th
1991	International Formula 3000 Championship	RSM Marko	5	0	0	0	1	6	12th
1991	Formula One	Leyton House Racing	2	0	0	0	0	0	NC
1991	24 Hours of Le Mans	Team Sauber Mercedes	1	0	1	0	0	N/A	5th
1992	Formula One	March F1	14	0	0	0	0	3	12th
1992	24 Hours of Le Mans	Peugeot Talbot Sport	1	0	0	0	0	N/A	DNF
1993	Formula One	Team Sauber Formula 1	16	0	0	0	0	7	12th
1994	Formula One	Broker Sauber Mercedes	3	0	0	0	0	4	19th
1995	Formula One	Red Bull Sauber Ford	6	0	0	0	0	0	NC
1995	BPR Global GT Series	March One Racing	1	0	0	0	0	0	NC
1996	Super Tourenwagen Cup	A.Z.K./ROC Competition	18	0	0	0	3	366	5th
1996	24 Hours of Le Mans - LMGT1	Porsche AG	1	0	0	0	1	N/A	**3rd**
1997	Italian Superturismo Championship	Audi Sport Italia	20	0	0	0	7	156	5th
1997	24 Hours of Le Mans - LMGT1	Roock Racing	1	0	0	0	0	N/A	DNF
1998	FIA GT Championship - GT2	Viper Team Oreca	9	1	0	0	6	38	**3rd**
1998	24 Hours of Le Mans - LMGT2	Viper Team Oreca	1	0	0	0	0	N/A	DNF
1999	FIA GT Championship	Chrysler Viper Team Oreca	9	6	4	4	9	78	**1st**
1999	American Le Mans Series - GTS	Viper Team Oreca	6	3	0	1	6	137	**2nd**
1999	24 Hours of Le Mans - LMGTS	Viper Team Oreca	1	1	0	0	1	N/A	**1st**
2000	American Le Mans Series - GTS	Viper Team Oreca	12	9	2	3	11	264	**2nd**
2000	24 Hours of Le Mans - LMGTS	Viper Team Oreca	1	1	1	0	1	N/A	**1st**
2001	V8Star Series	Zakspeed Motorsport	9	0	1	0	2	142	11th
2001	24 Hours of Le Mans - LMP900	Team PlayStation	1	0	0	0	1	N/A	**3rd**
2001	American Le Mans Series - GT	Schnitzer Motorsport	1	0	0	0	0	22	33rd
2002	Deutsche Tourenwagen Masters	Abt Sportsline	9	0	0	0	0	3	14th
2003	Deutsche Tourenwagen Masters	Abt Sportsline	10	0	0	0	0	1	16th
2003	24 Hours of Nürburgring - E1-XP	Abt Sportsline	1	0	?	?	1	N/A	**2nd**
2004	FIA GT Championship - GT1	JMB Racing	11	1	0	1	3	50.5	8th
2005	FIA GT Championship - GT1	JMB Racing	11	1	0	0	5	71	4th
2005	Rolex Sports Car Series - GT	Red Bull Ebimotors	1	1	0	0	0	7	172nd
2006	FIA GT Championship - GT1	Race Alliance	10	1	0	0	2	32.5	14th
2007	FIA GT Championship - GT1	Jetalliance Racing	10	3	3	0	4	57	**2nd**
2007	Le Mans Series - GT1	Jetalliance Racing	1	0	0	0	0	4	25th
2007	Rolex Sports Car Series - DP	Sigalsport BMW	1	0	0	0	0	6	79th
2008	FIA GT Championship - GT1	Jetalliance Racing	8	3	3	0	4	44	6th
2008	24 Hours of Le Mans - GT1	Aston Martin Racing	1	0	0	0	0	N/A	4th
2008	24 Hours of Nürburgring - SP8		1	0	0	0	0	N/A	9th
2009	FIA GT Championship - GT1	K plus K Motorsport	4	1	1	0	1	10	18th
2010	GT1 World Championship	Swiss Racing Team	20	0	0	0	0	2	43rd
2011	GT1 World Championship	Swiss Racing Team	8	0	0	0	0	31	16th
2012	International GT Open	Seyffarth Motorsport	2	0	0	0	0	0	NC
2012	ADAC GT Masters	Seyffarth Motorsport	2	0	0	0	0	0	NC
2012	Blancpain Endurance Series - Pro	KRK Racing	2	0	0	0	1	21	16th
2013	Blancpain Endurance Series - Pro	Fortec Motorsport	1	0	0	0	0	0	NC
2015	Blancpain Endurance Series - Pro-Am	Car Collection Motorsport	1	0	0	0	0	0	NC
2015	24H Series - A6	Car Collection Motorsport							
2016	ADAC GT Masters	Car Collection Motorsport	4	0	0	0	0	0	NC

=== Complete German Formula Three results ===
(key) (Races in bold indicate pole position) (Races in italics indicate fastest lap)

Year	Entrant	Engine	Class	1	2	3	4	5	6	7	8	9	10	11	12	DC	Pts
1988	Krafft Walzen Team	Alfa Romeo	A	ZOL; Ret	HOC; Ret	NÜR; 6	BRN; 6	HOC; 11	MFA; 15	NOR; C	WUN; Ret	SAL; 16	NÜR; 4	HUN; 6	HOC; Ret	11th	69
1989	Krafft Walzen Team	Alfa Romeo	A	HOC; DNS	NÜR; 4	AVU; 1	BRN; 4	ÖST; 4	**HOC**; 2	WUN; 4	HOC; 1	DIE; 3	NÜR; 2	NÜR; 7	HOC; 14	1st	164

=== Complete International Formula 3000 results ===
(key) (Races in bold indicate pole position; races in italics indicate fastest lap.)

Year	Entrant	Chassis	Engine	1	2	3	4	5	6	7	8	9	10	11	Pos.	Pts
1990	RSM Marko	Lola T90/50	Cosworth	DON; DNQ	SIL; 14	PAU	JER; DNQ	MNZ; Ret	PER; Ret	HOC; 5	BRH; DNQ	BIR; 10	BUG	NOG; 9	21st	2
1991	RSM Marko	Reynard 91D	Cosworth	VAL	PAU	JER; 5	MUG	PER; Ret	HOC; 3	BRH	SPA; Ret	BUG; Ret	NOG		12th	6

=== Complete Formula One results ===
(key)

Year	Entrant	Chassis	Engine	1	2	3	4	5	6	7	8	9	10	11	12	13	14	15	16	17	WDC	Pts
1991	Leyton House Racing	Leyton House CG911	Ilmor 2175A 3.5 V10	USA	BRA	SMR	MON	CAN	MEX	FRA	GBR	GER	HUN	BEL	ITA	POR	ESP	JPN; Ret	AUS; 20		NC	0
1992	March F1	March CG911	Ilmor 2175A 3.5 V10	RSA; Ret	MEX; Ret	BRA; Ret	ESP; 8	SMR; 12	MON; Ret	CAN; 4	FRA; Ret	GBR; Ret	GER; 16	HUN; Ret	BEL; 11	ITA; 10	POR; Ret	JPN	AUS		12th	3
1993	Team Sauber Formula 1	Sauber C12	Sauber 2175A 3.5 V10	RSA; Ret	BRA; Ret	EUR; Ret	SMR; Ret	ESP; Ret	MON; 13	CAN; 6	FRA; Ret	GBR; Ret	GER; 9	HUN; 6	BEL; Ret	ITA; 4	POR; 5	JPN; Ret	AUS; 15		12th	7
1994	Broker Sauber Mercedes	Sauber C13	Mercedes-Benz 2175B 3.5 V10	BRA; 6	PAC; Ret	SMR; 4	MON; DNS	ESP	CAN	FRA	GBR	GER	HUN	BEL	ITA	POR	EUR	JPN	AUS		19th	4
1995	Red Bull Sauber Ford	Sauber C14	Ford ECA Zetec-R 3.0 V8	BRA; Ret	ARG; Ret	SMR; Ret	ESP; 13	MON	CAN	FRA	GBR	GER	HUN	BEL	ITA	POR	EUR	PAC	JPN; 10	AUS; Ret	NC	0

=== 24 Hours of Le Mans results ===
Year	Team	Co-Drivers	Car	Class	Laps	Pos.	Class Pos.
1991	(Germany) Team Sauber Mercedes	(Germany) Michael Schumacher (Germany) Fritz Kreutzpointner	Mercedes-Benz C11	C2	355	5th	5th
1992	(France) Peugeot Talbot Sport	(Belgium) Eric van de Poele (France) Alain Ferté	Peugeot 905 Evo 1B	C1	208	DNF	DNF
1996	(Germany) Porsche AG	(France) Yannick Dalmas (Canada) Scott Goodyear	Porsche 911 GT1	GT1	341	**3rd**	**2nd**
1997	(Germany) Roock Racing	(France) Stéphane Ortelli (United Kingdom) Allan McNish	Porsche 911 GT1	GT1	8	DNF	DNF
1998	(France) Viper Team Oreca	(Belgium) Marc Duez (Netherlands) Patrick Huisman	Chrysler Viper GTS-R	GT2	28	DNF	DNF
1999	(France) Viper Team Oreca	(Monaco) Olivier Beretta (France) Dominique Dupuy	Chrysler Viper GTS-R	GTS	325	10th	**1st**
2000	(France) Viper Team Oreca	(Monaco) Olivier Beretta (France) Dominique Dupuy	Chrysler Viper GTS-R	GTS	333	7th	**1st**
2001	(France) Team PlayStation	(Monaco) Olivier Beretta (Portugal) Pedro Lamy	Chrysler LMP	LMP900	298	4th	**3rd**
2008	(United Kingdom) Aston Martin Racing	(Germany) Heinz-Harald Frentzen (Italy) Andrea Piccini	Aston Martin DBR9	GT1	339	16th	4th

=== Complete Deutsche Tourenwagen Meisterschaft/Masters results ===
(key) (Races in bold indicate pole position) (Races in italics indicate fastest lap)

Year	Team	Car	1	2	3	4	5	6	7	8	9	10	11	12	13	14	15	16	17	18	19	20	21	22	Pos.	Pts
1989	Star-Marko RSM	Mercedes 190 E 2.3-16	ZOL; 1; 27	ZOL; 2 Ret	HOC; 1; 23	HOC; 2; 16	NÜR; 1; 23	NÜR; 2 DNS	MFA; 1; 17	MFA; 2; 14	AVU; 1; 25	AVU; 2 DNS	NÜR; 1	NÜR; 2	NOR; 1 Ret	NOR; 2 DNS	HOC; 1; 18	HOC; 2; 19	DIE; 1; 22	DIE; 2; 14	NÜR; 1; 17	NÜR; 2 Ret	HOC; 1; 17	HOC; 2; 20	30th	20
1990	AMG Motorenbau GmbH	Mercedes 190 E 2.5-16 Evo	ZOL; 1	ZOL; 2	HOC; 1	HOC; 2	NÜR; 1	NÜR; 2	AVU; 1	AVU; 2	MFA; 1	MFA; 2	WUN; 1	WUN; 2	NÜR; 1	NÜR; 2	NOR; 1; 23	NOR; 2; 15	DIE; 1; 12	DIE; 2; 13	NÜR; 1	NÜR; 2			NC	0
1990	AMG Motorenbau GmbH	Mercedes 190 E 2.5-16 Evo II																					HOC; 1 Ret	HOC; 2 DNS	NC	0
2002	Abt Sportsline	Abt-Audi TT-R	HOC; QR; 10	HOC; CR; 6	ZOL; QR; 12	ZOL; CR; 18	DON; QR; 7	DON; CR; 5	SAC; QR; 21†	SAC; CR; DNS	NOR; QR; Ret	NOR; CR; 12	LAU; QR; 10	LAU; CR; Ret	NÜR; QR; 6	NÜR; CR; 12	A1R; QR; 13	A1R; CR; 16	ZAN; QR; 9	ZAN; CR; 19	HOC; QR; 4	HOC; CR; Ret			14th	3
2003	Abt Sportsline	Abt-Audi TT-R	HOC; 15	ADR; 12	NÜR; 16	LAU; 13	NOR; 11	DON; 15	NÜR; 11	A1R; 16	ZAN; 8	HOC; 17													16th	1

- † — Retired, but was classified as he completed 90% of the winner's race distance.

=== Complete Super Tourenwagen Cup results ===
(key) (Races in bold indicate pole position) (Races in italics indicate fastest lap)

Year	Team	Car	1	2	3	4	5	6	7	8	9	10	11	12	13	14	15	16	17	18	Pos.	Pts
1996	A.Z.K./ROC	Audi A4 Quattro	ZOL; 1; 5	ZOL; 2 Ret	ASS; 1; 5	ASS; 2; 5	HOC; 1; 3	HOC; 2; 2	SAC; 1; 4	SAC; 2; 4	WUN; 1; 3	WUN; 2; 4	ZWE; 1; 7	ZWE; 2 Ret	SAL; 1; 12	SAL; 2; 13	AVU; 1; 6	AVU; 2; 5	NÜR; 1; 10	NÜR; 2; 5	5th	366

=== Complete Italian Touring Car Championship results ===
(key) (Races in bold indicate pole position) (Races in italics indicate fastest lap)

Year	Team	Car	1	2	3	4	5	6	7	8	9	10	11	12	13	14	15	16	17	18	19	20	Pos.	Pts
1997	Audi Sport Italia	Audi A4 Quattro	MNZ; 1; 3	MNZ; 2; 4	MUG; 1; 3	MUG; 2; 4	MAG; 1 Ret	MAG; 2 Ret	IMO; 1; 6	IMO; 2; 6	IMO; 1; 3	IMO; 2; 7	BIN; 1; 3	BIN; 2; 3	PER; 1; 4	PER; 2; 5	VAR; 1; 3	VAR; 2; 3	MIS; 1 Ret	MIS; 2; 5	VAL; 1; 7	VAL; 2; 6	5th	156

=== Complete FIA GT Championship results ===
(key) (Races in bold indicate pole position) (Races in italics indicate fastest lap)

Year	Team	Car	Class	1	2	3	4	5	6	7	8	9	10	11	Pos.	Pts
1998	Viper Team Oreca	Chrysler Viper GTS-R	GT2	OSC; 2	SIL; Ret	HOC; 2	DIJ; 2	HUN; Ret	SUZ; 2	DON; 3	A1R; 1	HOM; Ret	LAG; DNS		3rd	38
1999	Chrysler Viper Team Oreca	Chrysler Viper GTS-R	GT2	**MNZ**; 1	**SIL**; 1	HOC	**HUN**; 2	ZOL; 1	OSC; 1	DON; 1	**HOM**; 2	GLN; 2	ZHU; 1		1st	78
2004	JMB Racing	Ferrari 575-GTC Maranello	GT	MNZ; Ret	VAL; 4	MAG; 2	HOC; 11	BRN; 2	DON; 1	SPA; 4	IMO; 9	OSC; 4	DUB; Ret	ZHU; 5	8th	50.5
2005	JMB Racing	Maserati MC12 GT1	GT1	MNZ; 5	MAG; 1	SIL; 4	IMO; 4	BRN; 2	SPA; 2	OSC; 2	IST; 3	ZHU; 6	DUB; 4	BHR; Ret	4th	71
2006	Race Alliance	Aston Martin DBR9	GT1	SIL; Ret	BRN; Ret	OSC; 7	SPA; 8	PRI; 4	DIJ; 2	MUG; 1	HUN; Ret	ADR; Ret	DUB; 5		14th	32.5
2007	Jetalliance Racing	Aston Martin DBR9	GT1	ZHU; 9	SIL; 4	BUC; 4	**MNZ**; 1	OSC; Ret	SPA; Ret	**ADR**; 1	BRN; 2	NOG; 5	**ZOL**; 1		2nd	57
2008	Jetalliance Racing	Aston Martin DBR9	GT1	SIL; 1	MNZ; 7	ADR; Ret	**OSC**; 1	SPA; Ret	BUC; DNS	BUC	**BRN**; 1	NOG; 5	**ZOL**; 3	SAN	9th	44
2009	K plus K Motorsport	Saleen S7R	GT1	**SIL**; 1	ADR; Ret	OSC; 10	SPA	BUC; DSQ	ALG	PRI	ZOL				18th	10

=== Complete GT1 World Championship results ===
Year	Team	Car	1	2	3	4	5	6	7	8	9	10	11	12	13	14	15	16	17	18	19	20	Pos.	Points
2010	Swiss Racing Team	Nissan GT-R GT1	ABU; QR; 9	ABU; CR; 14	SIL; QR; 15	SIL; CR; Ret	BRN; QR; 12	BRN; CR; 10	PRI; QR; 21	PRI; CR; 15	SPA; QR; 16	SPA; CR; 12	NÜR; QR; 14	NÜR; CR; 10	ALG; QR; Ret	ALG; CR; 20	NAV; QR; 14	NAV; CR; Ret	INT; QR; 17	INT; CR; 18	SAN; QR; 7	SAN; CR; Ret	43rd	2
2011	Swiss Racing Team	Lamborghini Murciélago LP 670 R-SV	ABU; QR; 10	ABU; CR; 7	ZOL; QR; 4	ZOL; CR; 4	ALG; QR; 10	ALG; CR; 5	SAC; QR; 12	SAC; CR; Ret	SIL; QR	SIL; CR	NAV; QR	NAV; CR	PRI; QR	PRI; CR	ORD; QR	ORD; CR	BEI; QR	BEI; CR	SAN; QR	SAN; CR	16th	31

== Helmet ==
Wendlinger's helmet is yellow with 2 blue parallel lines in the middle of the helmet, a blue circle on the top and 3 red white red arrows between the parallel lines.

Sporting positions
Preceded by Franz Binder	Austria Formula 3 Cup; Champion; 1988	Succeeded by Josef Neuhauser
Preceded by Joachim Winkelhock	German Formula Three Champion; 1989	Succeeded by Michael Schumacher
Preceded by Klaus Ludwig; Ricardo Zonta	FIA GT Championship; Champion; 1999; With: Olivier Beretta	Succeeded by Julian Bailey; Jamie Campbell-Walter
