= JJ Lehto =

Finnish racing driver (born 1966)

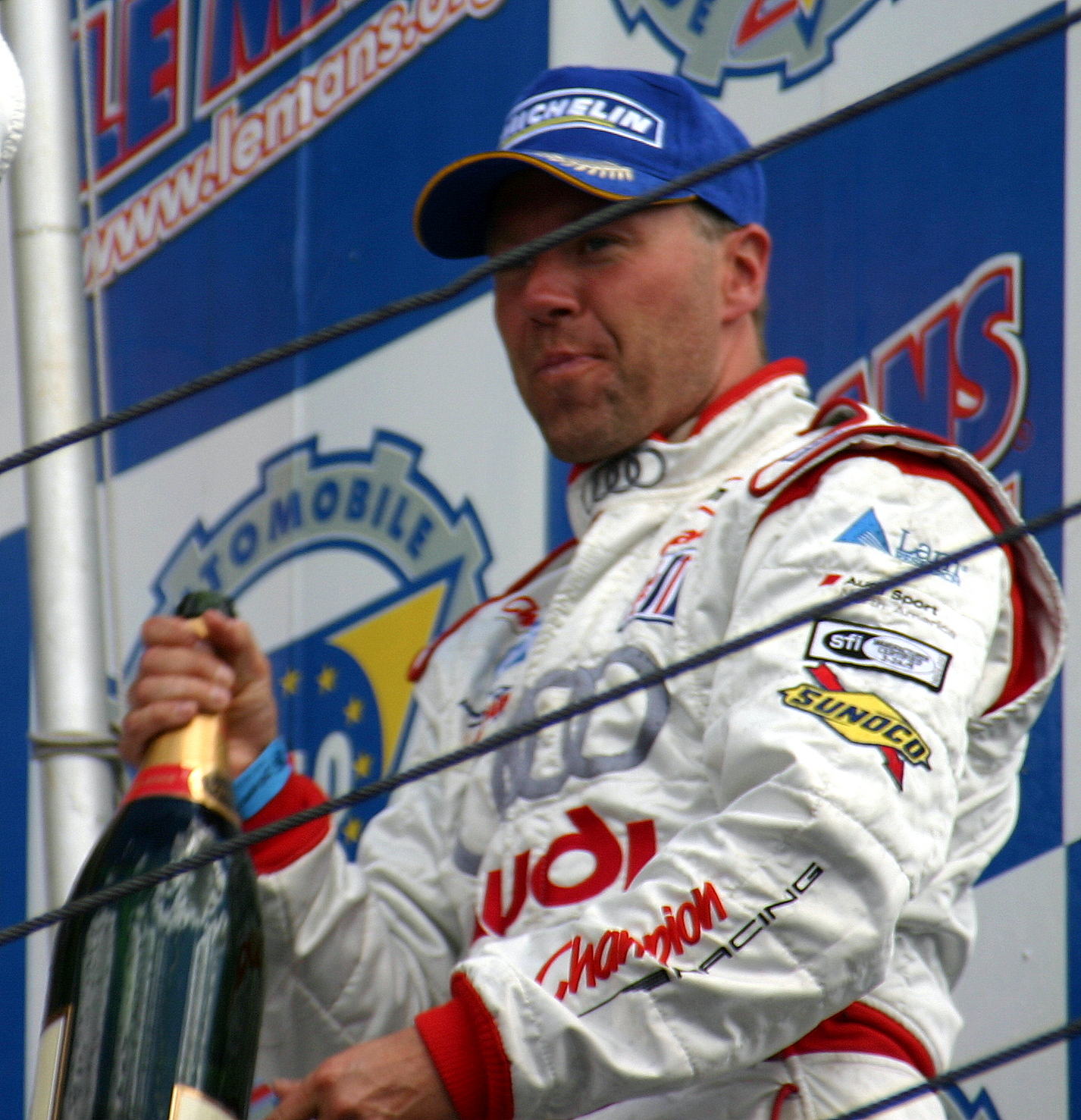
- Lehto at the 2004 24 Hours of Le Mans
- Born: Jyrki Juhani Järvilehto; 31 January 1966 (age 60); Espoo, Uusimaa, Finland

Formula One World Championship career
- Nationality: (Finland) Finnish
- Active years: 1989–1994
- Team(s): Onyx, Scuderia Italia, Sauber, Benetton
- Entries: 70 (62 starts)
- Championships: 0
- Wins: 0
- Podiums: 1
- Career points: 10
- Pole positions: 0
- Fastest laps: 0
- First entry: 1989 Portuguese Grand Prix
- Last entry: 1994 Australian Grand Prix

American Le Mans Series career
- Years active: 1999–2005
- Teams: BMW, Cadillac, Champion
- Starts: 60
- Championships: 1 (2004)
- Wins: 23
- Podiums: 49

24 Hours of Le Mans career
- Years: 1990–1991, 1995–1997, 1999, 2002–2005
- Teams: RLR, Porsche, McLaren, Gulf, BMW, Cadillac, Champion
- Best finish: 1st (1995, 2005)
- Class wins: 3 (1995, 2003, 2005)

Jyrki Juhani Järvilehto (Finnish pronunciation: [ˈjyrki ˈjærʋilehto]; born 31 January 1966), commonly known as JJ Lehto, is a Finnish former racing driver and broadcaster, who competed in Formula One from 1989 to 1994. In sportscar racing, Lehto won the American Le Mans Series in 2004 and is a two-time winner of the 24 Hours of Le Mans in 1995 and 2005, as well as a two-time winner of the 12 Hours of Sebring in 1999 and 2005.

Born and raised in Espoo, Lehto began competitive kart racing aged eight before graduating to Formula Ford in 1981. A protégé of 1982 World Drivers' Champion Keke Rosberg, Lehto won several national and continental Formula Ford titles prior to dominating the 1988 British Formula Three Championship with Pacific. Lehto competed at 70 Formula One Grands Prix for Onyx, Italia, Sauber and Benetton, making his debut at the 1989 Portuguese Grand Prix with the former. He achieved a podium finish with Italia at the 1991 San Marino Grand Prix.

Upon retiring from motor racing, Lehto became a commentator and pundit for MTV3. In June 2010, Lehto was injured in a boating incident in Ekenäs, during which an unnamed associate was killed. Lehto was found guilty of negligent homicide and driving under the influence, and sentenced to 28 months in prison. He appealed the conviction to the Turku Court of Appeal, who overturned the verdict in November 2012, due to inconclusive evidence that Lehto was driving the boat.

== Early career ==
Like many racing drivers, Lehto began in karts at the age of eight, winning numerous events, before graduating to Formula Ford at the early age of 15. A switch to single seaters saw him dominate the Scandinavian Formula Ford. He then won the British and European Formula 2000 championship in 1987 and went on to win the coveted British Formula 3 title in 1988, driving for Pacific Racing. In 1989, Lehto drove in Formula 3000, again for Pacific Racing. The season was not successful and he failed to score any podium finishes. He did not participate in the last race which was held in Dijon-Prenois. He was a protégé of Finnish 1982 Formula One World Champion Keke Rosberg, who first suggested that Jyrki Järvilehto should abbreviate his name to the more manageable JJ Lehto.

== Formula One career ==
In 1989, Lehto tested for Ferrari before making his Formula One debut for the Onyx team as a late-season replacement for Bertrand Gachot. Though he failed to prequalify for his first race at Estoril he impressed with his speed in the tough sessions and made his first start in the following meeting. In the wet season finale at Adelaide, he ran as high as fifth before retiring with waterlogged electrics. Over the summer, Onyx were sold to Swiss racer turned businessman Peter Monteverdi. Lehto, marked by many as a star of the future, was paired with Gregor Foitek but financial difficulties hampered his season, leading to the team's withdrawal after the Hungarian Grand Prix (one of five events the Finn failed to qualify for – though he had been hindered by the team's poor preparation, including a driveshaft being fitted the wrong way around for several meetings, and favouritism towards Foitek, whose father was involved with the buyout).

For 1991, Lehto was signed by the ambitious Scuderia Italia team, financed by Beppe Lucchini with a Dallara chassis, Judd V10 engines and Emanuele Pirro in the second car. Due to poor results in 1990, the cars had to prequalify but soon established themselves as decent midfield runners. In the wet San Marino Grand Prix, Lehto impressed by lasting in a race of attrition to finish third, scoring his first F1 points. He impressed elsewhere but did not score again through poor reliability and bad luck (only finishing on four other occasions). He stayed with the team in 1992, now paired with Pierluigi Martini and using Ferrari V12 engines but the new Dallara B192 chassis had severe handling problems. Lehto's best result was seventh at Spa, his worst a failure to qualify at the Hungaroring.

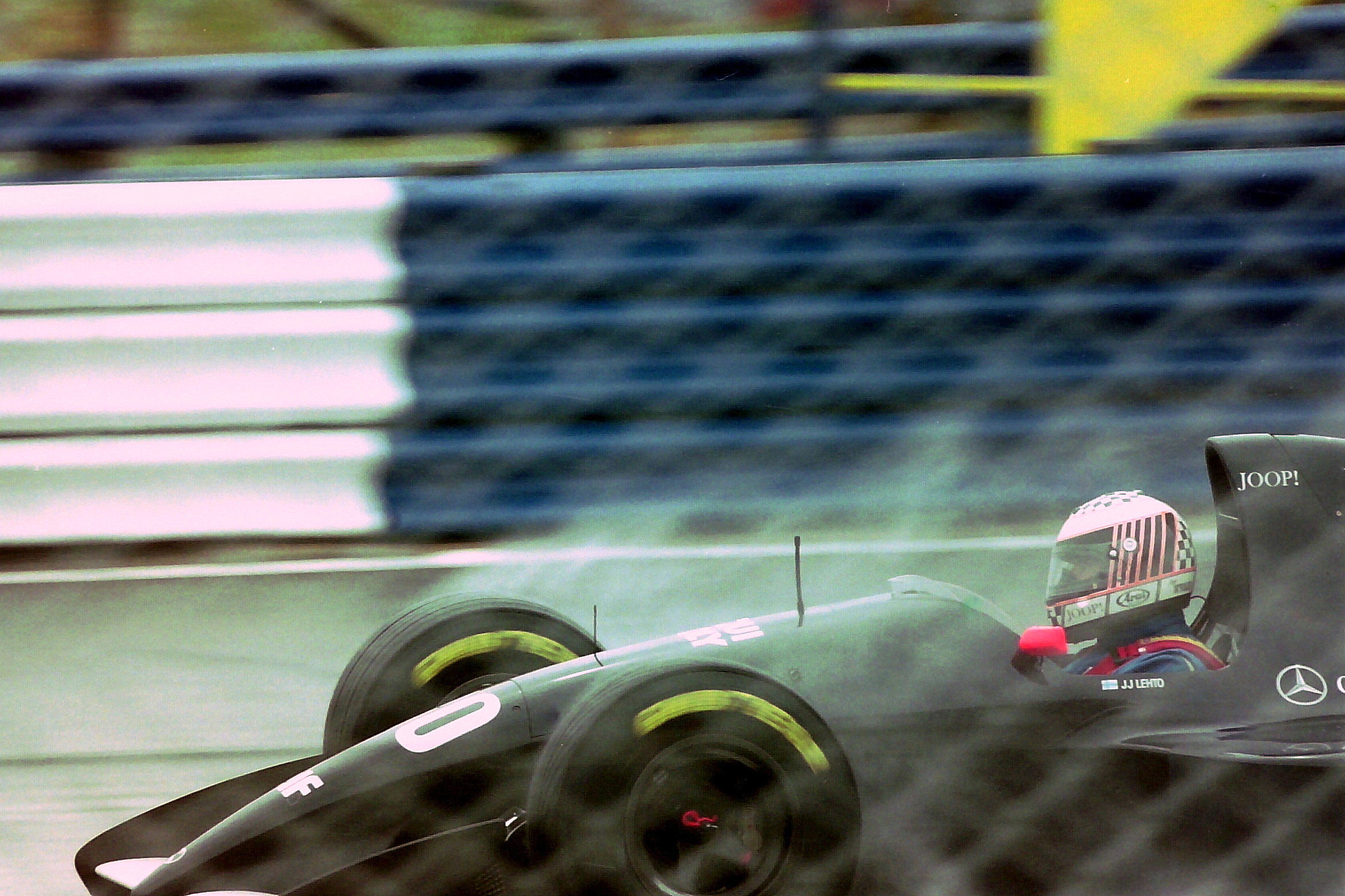
Lehto driving for Sauber at the 1993 British Grand Prix.

Lehto landed the second seat (alongside Austrian Karl Wendlinger) at the new, much-anticipated Sauber team for 1993, running Ilmor engines. The season started very well as Lehto survived a late downpour at Kyalami to score fifth place on the team's debut, then finished fourth at Imola despite a late engine failure. However, after a collision with Wendlinger at Monaco, his relationship with both his teammate and Sauber became frosty and his season tailed off with no more points scored.

For 1994, Lehto saw off competition from Michele Alboreto and Luca Badoer to land the second seat at Benetton alongside Michael Schumacher. However, he injured his neck testing the new B194 in pre-season with test driver Jos Verstappen taking his place for the first two rounds of the championship. Lehto returned to the cockpit for the ill-fated San Marino Grand Prix despite some question marks over his fitness. He qualified fifth but stalled on the grid, his car being struck from behind by Pedro Lamy's Lotus. Despite running third in Spain before an engine failure and scoring a point in Canada (after the disqualification of Christian Fittipaldi) it was clear his injuries had not healed fully and he was replaced once again by Verstappen for the French Grand Prix. He returned to the cockpit for the Italian and Portuguese rounds in place of the suspended Schumacher but did not impress and was released entirely soon afterwards when the team signed Johnny Herbert. This freed him up to drive in the last two rounds for Sauber – Wendlinger's injuries from an accident in practice before the 1994 Monaco GP had failed to heal and his previous replacement Andrea de Cesaris was unreachable.

== Post-Formula One career ==
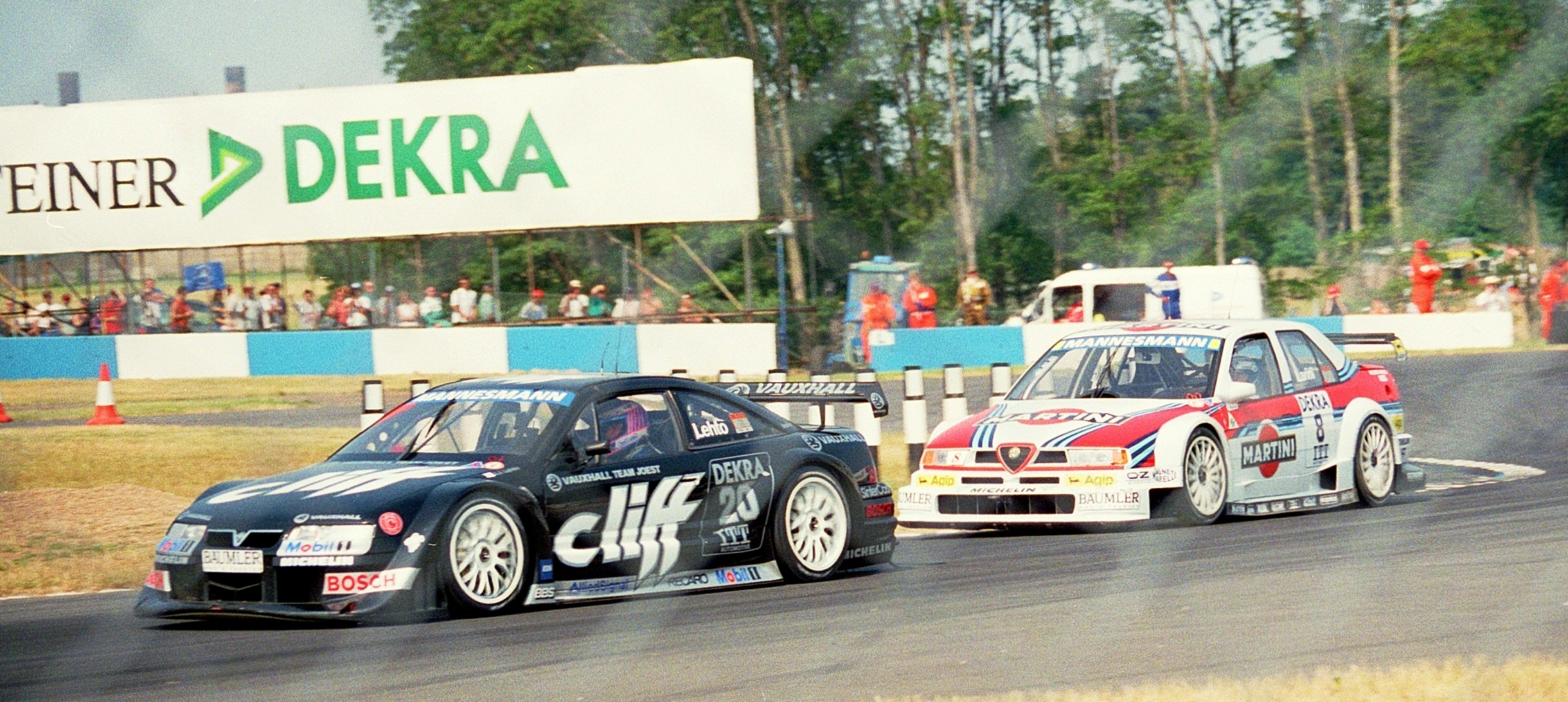
JJ Lehto - Opel Calibra V6 4x4 leads Nicola Larini - Alfa Romeo 155 V6 Ti at Donington 1995

After his Formula One career stalled, and advised by his manager Keke Rosberg, Lehto joined the German Touring Car Championship, DTM, in 1995 and 1996. Even though rated highly, victories eluded him, but this loss was probably made up by his successes in GT and sports car racing.

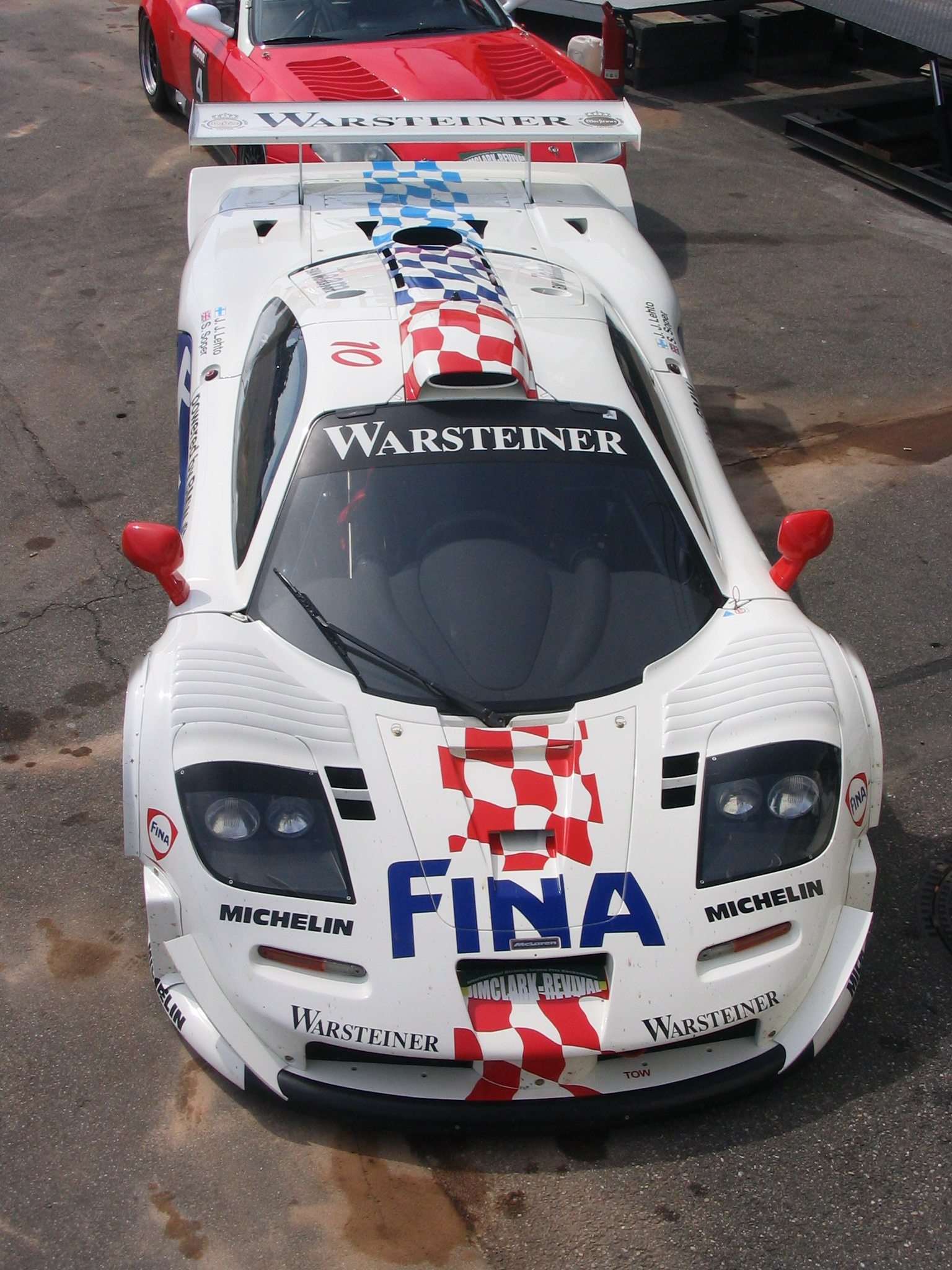
An ex-Lehto McLaren F1 GTR

Lehto was a late addition to the 1995 edition of the 24 Hours of Le Mans in a McLaren F1 GTR, but he won the race outright, at his third attempt, sharing the car with Yannick Dalmas and Masanori Sekiya. Lehto was an integral part of the win, gaining the lead for the team by driving a few stints during the rainy night. While others were driving cautiously, Lehto was seen to be sliding the car, lapping at times 30sec faster than everyone else. He had three more guest appearances in the same car the next year, winning another race, before he got picked up by BMW to join the factory squad in the inaugural FIA GT season, partnering Steve Soper. Even though success came initially easily, including a win in front of his home crowd at the Thunder In Helsinki event, the might of Mercedes-Benz caught up with the McLarens and left Lehto conceding the title to former DTM rival Bernd Schneider.

After an unsuccessful 1998 campaign as a Mercedes-Benz factory driver in the American-based single-seater CART series with Team Hogan, Lehto stayed Stateside but returned to the BMW camp, which entered their V12 LMR sportscar racer in the American Le Mans Series, ALMS. Even though he ended up winning four races, Lehto lost the title on the account of a formality (he was not awarded the points gained for winning the 12 Hours of Sebring because he did not have an American racing license at that time). 2000 proved less successful as the near-unbeatable Audi R8 entered the scene.

BMW and Lehto stayed in the ALMS series, but stepped down to the GT-class with the controversial M3 GTR. The team was virtually unbeatable but Lehto lost out in the championship to the driver he shared the car with, Jörg Müller, as the latter had more fastest laps and laps in the lead to his name.

Lehto found the M3 already not fast enough to his liking, so it was not surprising when Lehto turned down BMW's offer to join them in the European Touring Car Championship (ETCC) the following year, having to race a near standard 320i tin-top racer. 2002 started with unemployment, but he was picked up by Cadillac as an addition to their Northstar LMP sportscar programme at Le Mans and in the ALMS series. Although the car was not on the pace of the Audi R8s or Panoz LMPs, the car's fortunes did seem to turn for the better when it started to notch up regular podium finishes in the second half of the year. Cadillac's mother company General Motors pulled the plug on the project, leaving Lehto again without a job if it had not been for Champion Racing, who offered him a drive in their Audi R8.

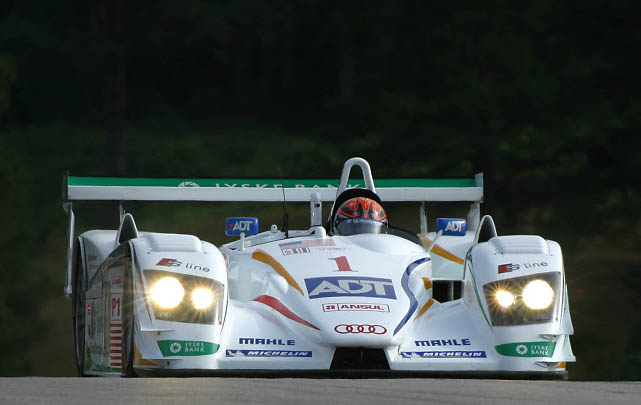
JJ Lehto at 2005 Petit Le Mans.

Lehto won four times in 2003 (including the prestigious Petit Le Mans event at Road Atlanta), but it was not until the factory Audi squad left the ALMS series that he was finally able to reap full rewards in 2004 and score his first championship success since his 1988 title in the British Formula Three, picking up six victories on the way.

A disappointing second half of the 2005 season prevented him from scoring double championship success, but nonetheless he managed to end his last year in full-time racing on an impressive note when winning both the 12 Hours of Sebring and the 24 Hours of Le Mans again.

In 2006 it was announced the Solaroli team would purchase two Porsche RS Spyders to be entered in the ALMS series. One car would be driven by Lehto, partnered by Johnny Herbert. However, even though getting confirmation about the deal going through in early 2007, nothing ever materialised.

Lehto did show up at the 2007 edition of the 24 Hours of Daytona to team up with Colin Braun and Max Papis in the Krohn Racing Pontiac-Riley. His first participation in the event was not a success though as the car suffered from a misfire, and after having spent a long time in the pits, finished 17th.

In 2008, Lehto made an unexpected return to the race tracks when he showed up at the Malaysian Grand Prix to drive in the Speedcar support race, taking over the No. 90 car previously vacated by Narain Karthikeyan.

In 2001, Lehto joined Finnish television as an expert race commentator and remained a mainstay at MTV3's Finnish Formula One race broadcasts (and also for the pay-channel MTV3 MAX) until 2010, alongside Oskari Saari.

== Boating incident ==
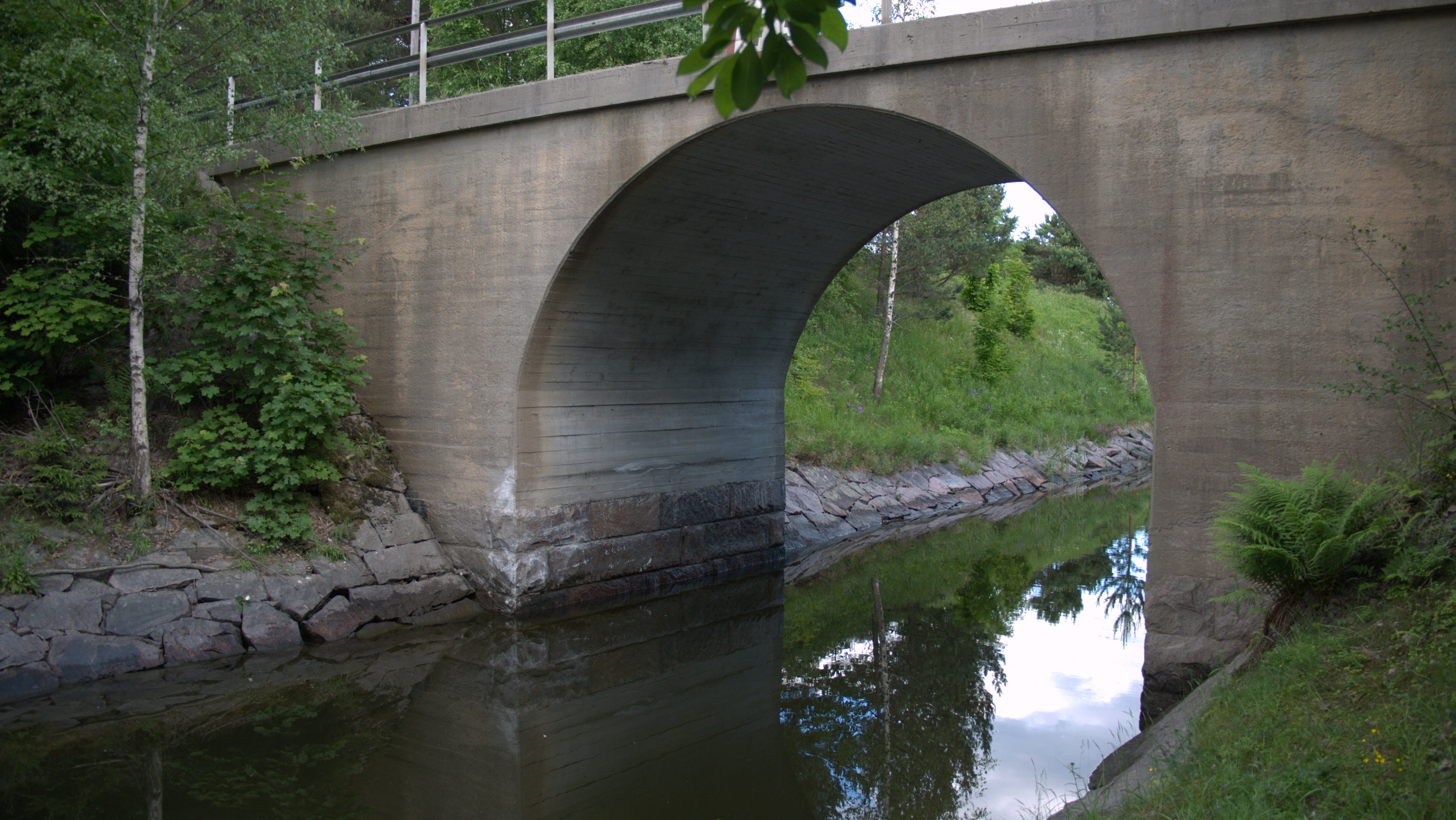
The scene of the boating incident

On 17 June 2010, Lehto was involved in a boating incident in Ekenäs. The incident happened when the boat carrying Lehto and his friend, whose identity was not released, hit the base of a bridge in a canal. Lehto was injured and the other man was killed in the incident. Lehto had been drinking throughout the day and was heavily intoxicated at the time of the incident.

In January 2011, Ilta-Sanomat reported that the police investigations had concluded that no one besides Lehto could have been driving the boat at the time of the incident. Lehto faced charges of negligent homicide, reckless driving and driving under the influence. Regardless of the pending trial, Lehto made a return to sportscasting on the Finnish sports-channel URHOtv, commentating on a DTM event. On 14 December 2011, the District Court found Lehto guilty of drunk sailing and negligent homicide, and sentenced him to two years and four months in prison. Lehto however appealed the decision, and on 30 November 2012, the Turku Court of Appeal cleared him of all charges relating to the incident, finding the evidence regarding who had been driving the boat inconclusive.

== Racing record ==
=== Career summary ===
Season	Series	Team	Races	Wins	Poles	F/Laps	Podiums	Points	Position
1985	Formula Ford Finland		5	0	?	?	3	31	4th
1985	Nordic Formula Ford		1	0	0	0	0	4	13th
1986	Formula Ford Finland	Formula Ford Finland	?	?	?	?	?	?	**1st**
1986	EFDA Formula Ford 1600		5	3	?	?	3	70	**1st**
1986	Formula Ford Festival		1	0	0	0	0	N/A	NC
1987	Formula Ford 2000 Europe	Pacific Racing	7	6	?	4	6	128	**1st**
1987	Formula Ford 2000 Great Britain	Pacific Racing	?	?	?	?	?	?	**1st**
1987	Formula Ford 2000 Netherlands		?	?	?	?	?	40	5th
1988	British Formula Three	Pacific Racing	18	8	6	11	14	164	**1st**
1988	Macau Grand Prix	Pacific Racing w/ Marlboro Theodore Racing	1	0	0	0	0	N/A	DNF
1989	International Formula 3000	Pacific Racing	9	0	0	0	0	6	14th
1989	Formula One	Moneytron Onyx Formula One	2	0	0	0	0	0	NC
1990	Formula One	Monteverdi Onyx Formula One	5	0	0	0	0	0	NC
1990	24 Hours of Le Mans	Richard Lloyd Racing	1	0	0	0	0	N/A	DNF
1990	24 Hours of Le Mans	Italya Sport	1	0	0	0	0	N/A	DNF
1991	Formula One	Scuderia Italia SpA	16	0	0	0	1	4	12th
1991	24 Hours of Le Mans	Porsche Kremer Racing	1	0	0	0	0	N/A	9th
1992	Formula One	Scuderia Italia SpA	15	0	0	0	0	0	NC
1993	Formula One	Team Sauber Formula 1	16	0	0	0	0	5	13th
1994	Formula One	Mild Seven Benetton Ford	8	0	0	0	0	1	24th
1994	Formula One	Sauber Mercedes	8	0	0	0	0	1	24th
1995	Deutsche Tourenwagen Meisterschaft	Opel Team Joest	14	0	0	0	0	36	13th
1995	International Touring Car Series	Opel Team Joest	10	0	0	0	1	26	11th
1995	BPR Global GT Series	Toyota Team Tom's	1	0	0	0	0	0	NC
1995	24 Hours of Le Mans	Kokusai Kaihatsu Racing	1	1	0	0	1	N/A	**1st**
1996	International Touring Car Championship	Team Rosberg Opel	25	0	0	0	5	148	5th
1996	BPR Global GT Series	Gulf Racing/GTC Motorsport	2	1	1	0	2	55	32nd
1996	24 Hours of Le Mans	Gulf Racing/GTC Racing	1	0	0	0	0	N/A	9th
1997	FIA GT Championship	BMW Motorsport	11	4	3	1	8	59	**2nd**
1997	24 Hours of Le Mans	BMW Motorsport	1	0	0	0	0	N/A	DNF
1998	CART FedEx Championship Series	Hogan Racing	19	0	0	0	0	25	20th
1999	American Le Mans Series	BMW Motorsport	6	4	3	3	6	123	4th
1999	24 Hours of Le Mans	BMW Motorsport	1	0	0	0	0	N/A	DNF
2000	American Le Mans Series	BMW Motorsport	11	2	1	0	8	220	6th
2001	American Le Mans Series	BMW Motorsport	10	4	2	0	7	180	**2nd**
2002	American Le Mans Series	Team Cadillac	5	0	0	0	4	101	13th
2002	24 Hours of Le Mans	Team Cadillac	1	0	0	0	0	N/A	12th
2002	Deutsche Tourenwagen Masters	OPC Euroteam	2	0	0	0	0	0	21st
2003	American Le Mans Series	Champion Racing	9	4	2	2	8	163	**3rd**
2003	24 Hours of Le Mans	Champion Racing	1	0	0	0	1	N/A	**3rd**
2004	American Le Mans Series	Champion Racing	9	6	1	6	9	164	**1st**
2004	24 Hours of Le Mans	Champion Racing	1	0	0	0	1	N/A	**3rd**
2005	American Le Mans Series	Champion Racing	10	3	0	2	7	148	**3rd**
2005	24 Hours of Le Mans	Champion Racing	1	1	0	0	1	N/A	**1st**
2007	Rolex Sports Car Series	Krohn Racing	1	0	0	0	0	20	66th
2008	Speedcar Series	Speedcar Team	6	0	0	0	0	1	16th

=== Complete British Formula Three Championship results ===
(key) (Races in bold indicate pole position) (Races in italics indicate fastest lap)

Year	Entrant	Engine	Class	1	2	3	4	5	6	7	8	9	10	11	12	13	14	15	16	17	18	DC	Pts	Ref
1988	Pacific Racing	Toyota	A	THR; 1	**SIL**; 1	THR; Ret	BRH; 24	DON; 2	SIL; 1	BRH; 1	THR; Ret	**SIL**; 1	**DON**; 1	SIL; 3	SNE; 3	**OUL**; 2	**SIL**; 1	BRH; Ret	SPA; 1	**THR**; 2	SIL; 3	**1st**	**164**	

=== Complete Macau Grand Prix results ===
Year	Team	Chassis/Engine	Qualifying	Race1	Race2	Overall ranking
1988	(United Kingdom) Pacific Racing w/ Marlboro Theodore Racing	Reynard・Toyota	2nd	4	DNF	DNF

=== Complete International Formula 3000 results ===
(key)

Year	Entrant	1	2	3	4	5	6	7	8	9	10	DC	Points
1989	Pacific Racing	SIL; DSQ	VAL; Ret	PAU; 4	JER; 6	PER; Ret	BRH; Ret	BIR; Ret	SPA; 5	BUG; Ret	DIJ	14th	6

=== Complete Formula One results ===
(key)

Year	Entrant	Chassis	Engine	1	2	3	4	5	6	7	8	9	10	11	12	13	14	15	16	WDC	Pts
1989	Moneytron Onyx Formula One	Onyx ORE-1	Ford V8	BRA	SMR	MON	MEX	USA	CAN	FRA	GBR	GER	HUN	BEL	ITA	POR; DNPQ	ESP; Ret	JPN; DNPQ	AUS; Ret	NC	0
1990	Monteverdi Onyx Formula One	Onyx ORE-1	Ford V8	USA; DNQ	BRA; DNQ															NC	0
1990	Monteverdi Onyx Formula One	Onyx ORE-1B	Ford V8			SMR; 12	MON; Ret	CAN; Ret	MEX; Ret	FRA; DNQ	GBR; DNQ	GER; NC	HUN; DNQ	BEL	ITA	POR	ESP	JPN	AUS	NC	0
1991	Scuderia Italia SpA	Dallara BMS-191	Judd V10	USA; Ret	BRA; Ret	SMR; 3	MON; 11	CAN; Ret	MEX; Ret	FRA; Ret	GBR; 13	GER; Ret	HUN; Ret	BEL; Ret	ITA; Ret	POR; Ret	ESP; 8	JPN; Ret	AUS; 12	12th	4
1992	Scuderia Italia SpA	Dallara BMS-192	Ferrari V12	RSA; Ret	MEX; 8	BRA; 8	ESP; Ret	SMR; 11	MON; 9	CAN; 9	FRA; 9	GBR; 13	GER; 10	HUN; DNQ	BEL; 7	ITA; 11	POR; Ret	JPN; 9	AUS; Ret	NC	0
1993	Team Sauber Formula 1	Sauber C12	Sauber V10	RSA; 5	BRA; Ret	EUR; Ret	SMR; 4	ESP; Ret	MON; Ret	CAN; 7	FRA; Ret	GBR; 8	GER; Ret	HUN; Ret	BEL; 9	ITA; Ret	POR; 7	JPN; 8	AUS; Ret	13th	5
1994	Mild Seven Benetton Ford	Benetton B194	Ford V8	BRA	PAC	SMR; Ret	MON; 7	ESP; Ret	CAN; 6	FRA	GBR	GER	HUN	BEL	ITA; 9	POR; Ret	EUR			24th	1
1994	Sauber Mercedes	Sauber C13	Mercedes V10															JPN; Ret	AUS; 10	24th	1

=== Complete 24 Hours of Le Mans results ===
Year	Team	Co-Drivers	Car	Class	Laps	Pos.	Class Pos.
1990	(United Kingdom) Richard Lloyd Racing (Italy) Italya Sport	(Germany) Manuel Reuter (United Kingdom) James Weaver	Porsche 962C GTi	C1	181	DNF	DNF
1991	(Germany) Porsche Kremer Racing	(Germany) Manuel Reuter (Finland) Harri Toivonen	Porsche 962CK6	C2	343	9th	9th
1995	(United Kingdom) Kokusai Kaihatsu Racing	(France) Yannick Dalmas (Japan) Masanori Sekiya	McLaren F1 GTR	GT1	298	**1st**	**1st**
1996	(United Kingdom) Gulf Racing (United Kingdom) GTC Racing	(United Kingdom) Ray Bellm (United Kingdom) James Weaver	McLaren F1 GTR	GT1	323	9th	7th
1997	(Germany) Team BMW Motorsport (Germany) BMW Team Schnitzer	(United Kingdom) Steve Soper (Brazil) Nelson Piquet	McLaren F1 GTR	GT1	236	DNF	DNF
1999	(Germany) Team BMW Motorsport	(Denmark) Tom Kristensen (Germany) Jörg Müller	BMW V12 LMR	LMP	304	DNF	DNF
2002	(United States) Team Cadillac	(France) Éric Bernard (France) Emmanuel Collard	Cadillac Northstar LMP02	LMP900	334	12th	10th
2003	(United States) Champion Racing	(Italy) Emanuele Pirro (Sweden) Stefan Johansson	Audi R8	LMP900	372	**3rd**	**1st**
2004	(United States) ADT Champion Racing	(Germany) Marco Werner (Italy) Emanuele Pirro	Audi R8	LMP900	368	**3rd**	**3rd**
2005	(United States) ADT Champion Racing	(Denmark) Tom Kristensen (Germany) Marco Werner	Audi R8	LMP900	370	**1st**	**1st**

=== Complete Deutsche Tourenwagen Meisterschaft/Masters results ===
Year	Team	Car	1	2	3	4	5	6	7	8	9	10	11	12	13	14	15	16	17	18	19	20	Pos.	Pts
1995	Opel Team Joest	Opel Calibra V6 4x4	HOC; 1; 8	HOC; 2; 4	AVU; 1; 10	AVU; 2; 20	NOR; 1; 7	NOR; 2 Ret	DIE; 1; 15	DIE; 2; 8	NÜR; 1 NC	NÜR; 2 Ret	ALE; 1 Ret	ALE; 2; 8	HOC; 1; 6	HOC; 2; 6							13th	36
2002	OPC Euroteam	Opel Astra V8 Coupé 2001	HOC; QR	HOC; CR	ZOL; QR	ZOL; CR	DON; QR	DON; CR	SAC; QR	SAC; CR	NOR; QR	NOR; CR	LAU; QR	LAU; CR	NÜR; QR	NÜR; CR	A1R; QR; 18	A1R; CR; 10	ZAN; QR	ZAN; CR	HOC; QR	HOC; CR	21st	0

=== Complete International Touring Car Championship ===
Year	Team	Car	1	2	3	4	5	6	7	8	9	10	11	12	13	14	15	16	17	18	19	20	21	22	23	24	25	26	Pos.	Pts
1995	Opel Team Joest	Opel Calibra V6 4x4	MUG; 1; 11	MUG; 2; 8	HEL; 1; 3	HEL; 2 Ret	DON; 1; 14	DON; 2; 11	EST; 1; 11	EST; 2; 11	MAG; 1; 8	MAG; 2; 5																	11th	26
1996	Team Rosberg Opel	Opel Calibra V6 4x4	HOC; 1; 15	HOC; 2 Ret	NÜR; 1; 5	NÜR; 2; 2	EST; 1; 16	EST; 2 Ret	HEL; 1; 5	HEL; 2; 3	NOR; 1; 4	NOR; 2; 3	DIE; 1; 7	DIE; 2 Ret	SIL; 1; 5	SIL; 2; 2	NÜR; 1; 7	NÜR; 2; 5	MAG; 1; 5	MAG; 2; 3	MUG; 1; 9	MUG; 2; 15	HOC; 1; 5	HOC; 2; 8	INT; 1; 6	INT; 2; 9	SUZ; 1 Ret	SUZ; 2; 8	5th	148

=== American open-wheel racing results ===
(key)

==== CART ====
Year	Team	No.	Chassis	Engine	1	2	3	4	5	6	7	8	9	10	11	12	13	14	15	16	17	18	19	Rank	Points	Ref
1998	Hogan Racing	9	Reynard 98i	Mercedes-Benz IC108E	MIA; 14	MOT; 29	LBH; 18	NZR; 16	RIO; 10	STL; 9	MIL; 19	DET; 26	POR; 25	CLE; 28	TOR; 24	MIS; 20	MDO; 15	ROA; 18	VAN; 8	LS; 28	HOU; 10	SRF; 5	FON; 21	**20th**	**25**	

=== Complete American Le Mans Series results ===
Year	Entrant	Class	Chassis	Engine	1	2	3	4	5	6	7	8	9	10	11	12	Rank	Points	Ref
1999	BMW Motorsport	LMP	BMW V12 LMR	BMW S70 6.0 L V12	SEB; 1	ATL	MOS	SON; 1	POR; 2	PET; 3	MON; 1	LSV; 1					4th	123	
2000	BMW Motorsport	LMP	BMW V12 LMR	BMW S70 6.0 L V12	SEB; 3	CHA; 1	SIL; 1	NÜR; 2	SON; 3	MOS; 2	TEX; 4	ROS; 3	PET; 5	MON; 3	LSV; 9	ADE	6th	220	
2001	BMW Motorsport	GT	BMW M3	BMW 3.2L I6	TEX; 5												**2nd**	**180**	
2001	BMW Motorsport	GT	BMW M3 GTR	BMW 4.0L V8		SEB; 3	DON; Ret	JAR; 2	SON; 1	POR; 3	MOS; 1	MID; 1	MON; 1	PET; 4			**2nd**	**180**	
2002	Team Cadillac	LMP900	Cadillac Northstar LMP02	Cadillac Northstar 4.0L Turbo V8	SEB; Ret	SON	MID	AME	WAS	TRO	MOS; 3	MON; 3	MIA; 2	PET; 3			13th	101	
2003	ADT Champion Racing	LMP900	Audi R8	Audi 3.6L Turbo V8	SEB; 2	ATL; 1	SON; 2	TRO; 2	MOS; 4	AME; 1	MON; 3	MIA; 1	PET; 1				3rd	163	
2004	ADT Champion Racing	LMP1	Audi R8	Audi 3.6L Turbo V8	SEB; 2	MID; 1	LIM; 1	SON; 1	POR; 1	MOS; 2	AME; 1	PET; 1	MON; 2				1st	164	
2005	ADT Champion Racing	LMP1	Audi R8	Audi 3.6L Turbo V8	SEB; 1	ATL; 1	MID; 5	LIM; 1	SON; 3	POR; Ret	AME; 3	MOS; 2	PET; 3	MON; 4			3rd	148	

Sporting positions
Preceded by Johnny Herbert	British Formula Three Champion; 1988	Succeeded by David Brabham
Preceded by Yannick Dalmas; Hurley Haywood; Mauro Baldi	Winner of the 24 Hours of Le Mans; 1995; With: Yannick Dalmas & Masanori Sekiya	Succeeded by Manuel Reuter; Davy Jones; Alexander Wurz
Preceded by Inaugural	Race of Champions; Nations' Cup Winner; 1999; With: Tommi Mäkinen & Kari Tiainen	Succeeded by Régis Laconi; Yvan Muller; Gilles Panizzi
Preceded by Frank Biela; Marco Werner	American Le Mans Series; Champion; 2004; With: Marco Werner	Succeeded by Frank Biela; Emanuele Pirro
Preceded by Seiji Ara; Tom Kristensen; Rinaldo Capello	Winner of the 24 Hours of Le Mans; 2005; With: Marco Werner & Tom Kristensen	Succeeded by Frank Biela; Emanuele Pirro; Marco Werner
Awards and achievements
Preceded by Johnny Herbert	Autosport; National Racing Driver of the Year; 1988	Succeeded by Allan McNish
