= 2005 FIA GT Motorcity GT 500 =

The layout of the Dubai Autodrome.

The 2005 FIA GT Motorcity GT 500 was the tenth race for the 2005 FIA GT Championship season. It took place at the Dubai Autodrome, United Arab Emirates, on November 18, 2005.

== Official results ==
Class winners in bold. Cars failing to complete 70% of winner's distance marked as Not Classified (NC).

| Pos | Class | No | Team | Drivers | Chassis | Tyre | Laps |
| Pos | Class | No | Team | Drivers | Engine | Tyre | Laps |
|---|---|---|---|---|---|---|---|
| 1 | **GT1** | **11** | **(France) Larbre Compétition** | **(Switzerland) Gabriele Gardel (Portugal) Pedro Lamy** | **Ferrari 550-GTS Maranello** | MI | **89** |
| 1 | **GT1** | **11** | **(France) Larbre Compétition** | **(Switzerland) Gabriele Gardel (Portugal) Pedro Lamy** | **Ferrari 5.9L V12** | MI | **89** |
| 2 | GT1 | 9 | (Germany) Vitaphone Racing Team | (Germany) Michael Bartels (Germany) Timo Scheider | Maserati MC12 GT1 | P | 89 |
| 2 | GT1 | 9 | (Germany) Vitaphone Racing Team | (Germany) Michael Bartels (Germany) Timo Scheider | Maserati 6.0L V12 | P | 89 |
| 3 | GT1 | 6 | (Belgium) GLPK-Carsport | (Belgium) Bert Longin (Belgium) Anthony Kumpen (Netherlands) Mike Hezemans | Chevrolet Corvette C5-R | MI | 89 |
| 3 | GT1 | 6 | (Belgium) GLPK-Carsport | (Belgium) Bert Longin (Belgium) Anthony Kumpen (Netherlands) Mike Hezemans | Chevrolet LS7-R 7.0L V8 | MI | 89 |
| 4 | GT1 | 15 | (Monaco) JMB Racing | (Italy) Andrea Bertolini (Austria) Karl Wendlinger | Maserati MC12 GT1 | P | 89 |
| 4 | GT1 | 15 | (Monaco) JMB Racing | (Italy) Andrea Bertolini (Austria) Karl Wendlinger | Maserati 6.0L V12 | P | 89 |
| 5 | GT1 | 10 | (Germany) Vitaphone Racing Team | (Italy) Fabio Babini (Italy) Thomas Biagi | Maserati MC12 GT1 | P | 89 |
| 5 | GT1 | 10 | (Germany) Vitaphone Racing Team | (Italy) Fabio Babini (Italy) Thomas Biagi | Maserati 6.0L V12 | P | 89 |
| 6 | GT1 | 2 | (Italy) GPC Sport | (Switzerland) Jean-Denis Délétraz (Italy) Andrea Piccini (Belgium) Stéphane Lemeret | Ferrari 575-GTC Maranello | P | 89 |
| 6 | GT1 | 2 | (Italy) GPC Sport | (Switzerland) Jean-Denis Délétraz (Italy) Andrea Piccini (Belgium) Stéphane Lemeret | Ferrari 6.0L V12 | P | 89 |
| 7 | GT1 | 14 | (United Kingdom) Lister Racing | (United Kingdom) Justin Keen (United States) Liz Halliday | Lister Storm GT | D | 86 |
| 7 | GT1 | 14 | (United Kingdom) Lister Racing | (United Kingdom) Justin Keen (United States) Liz Halliday | Jaguar 7.0L V12 | D | 86 |
| 8 | **GT2** | **88** | **(United Kingdom) GruppeM Racing** | **(United Kingdom) Tim Sugden (France) Emmanuel Collard** | **Porsche 911 GT3-RSR** | MI | **86** |
| 8 | **GT2** | **88** | **(United Kingdom) GruppeM Racing** | **(United Kingdom) Tim Sugden (France) Emmanuel Collard** | **Porsche 3.6L Flat-6** | MI | **86** |
| 9 | GT1 | 18 | (Russia) Russian Age Racing | (Russia) Alexey Vasilyev (Russia) Nikolai Fomenko | Ferrari 550-GTS Maranello | MI | 85 |
| 9 | GT1 | 18 | (Russia) Russian Age Racing | (Russia) Alexey Vasilyev (Russia) Nikolai Fomenko | Ferrari 5.9L V12 | MI | 85 |
| 10 | GT1 | 12 | (France) Larbre Compétition | (Switzerland) Steve Zacchia (France) Jean-Luc Blanchemain (Belgium) Vincent Vosse | Ferrari 550-GTS Maranello | MI | 84 |
| 10 | GT1 | 12 | (France) Larbre Compétition | (Switzerland) Steve Zacchia (France) Jean-Luc Blanchemain (Belgium) Vincent Vosse | Ferrari 5.9L V12 | MI | 84 |
| 11 | GT2 | 90 | (Netherlands) Spyker Squadron | (Netherlands) Jeroen Bleekemolen (Netherlands) Donny Crevels | Spyker C8 Spyder GT2-R | D | 84 |
| 11 | GT2 | 90 | (Netherlands) Spyker Squadron | (Netherlands) Jeroen Bleekemolen (Netherlands) Donny Crevels | Audi 3.8L V8 | D | 84 |
| 12 | GT1 | 16 | (Monaco) JMB Racing | (Austria) Philipp Peter (Netherlands) Peter Kutemann (Netherlands) Dick Waaijenberg | Maserati MC12 GT1 | P | 84 |
| 12 | GT1 | 16 | (Monaco) JMB Racing | (Austria) Philipp Peter (Netherlands) Peter Kutemann (Netherlands) Dick Waaijenberg | Maserati 6.0L V12 | P | 84 |
| 13 | GT2 | 89 | (Monaco) JMB Racing | (Germany) Albert von Thurn und Taxis (United Kingdom) Chris Buncombe (Italy) Mauro Casadei | Ferrari 360 Modena GTC | P | 81 |
| 13 | GT2 | 89 | (Monaco) JMB Racing | (Germany) Albert von Thurn und Taxis (United Kingdom) Chris Buncombe (Italy) Mauro Casadei | Ferrari 3.6L V8 | P | 81 |
| 14 | GT2 | 69 | (Germany) Proton Competition | (Germany) Christian Ried (Germany) Gerold Ried | Porsche 911 GT3-RS | D | 80 |
| 14 | GT2 | 69 | (Germany) Proton Competition | (Germany) Christian Ried (Germany) Gerold Ried | Porsche 3.6L Flat-6 | D | 80 |
| 15 | GT1 | 17 | (Russia) Russian Age Racing | (France) Christophe Bouchut (France) Stéphane Ortelli | Aston Martin DBR9 | MI | 78 |
| 15 | GT1 | 17 | (Russia) Russian Age Racing | (France) Christophe Bouchut (France) Stéphane Ortelli | Aston Martin 6.0L V12 | MI | 78 |
| 16 | GT2 | 74 | (Italy) Ebimotors | (Italy) Luigi Moccia (Italy) Emanuele Busnelli | Porsche 911 GT3-RSR | D | 78 |
| 16 | GT2 | 74 | (Italy) Ebimotors | (Italy) Luigi Moccia (Italy) Emanuele Busnelli | Porsche 3.6L Flat-6 | D | 78 |
| 17 | **G2** | **105** | **(Belgium) Belgian Racing** | **(Belgium) Vanina Ickx (Belgium) Bas Leinders (Belgium) Renaud Kuppens** | **Gillet Vertigo Streiff** | D | **69** |
| 17 | **G2** | **105** | **(Belgium) Belgian Racing** | **(Belgium) Vanina Ickx (Belgium) Bas Leinders (Belgium) Renaud Kuppens** | **Alfa Romeo 3.6L V6** | D | **69** |
| 18 | **G3** | **132** | **(France) Jonathan Sicart** | **(France) Jonathan Sicart (France) Carine Sicart (France) Ange Barde** | **Ferrari 360 Modena Challenge** | P | **63** |
| 18 | **G3** | **132** | **(France) Jonathan Sicart** | **(France) Jonathan Sicart (France) Carine Sicart (France) Ange Barde** | **Ferrari 3.6L V8** | P | **63** |
| 19 DNF | GT2 | 57 | (Slovakia) Autoracing Club Bratislava | (Slovakia) Miro Konopka (Slovakia) Štefan Rosina | Porsche 911 GT3-RSR | D | 48 |
| 19 DNF | GT2 | 57 | (Slovakia) Autoracing Club Bratislava | (Slovakia) Miro Konopka (Slovakia) Štefan Rosina | Porsche 3.6L Flat-6 | D | 48 |
| 20 DNF | GT2 | 56 | (Czech Republic) Czech National Team | (Czech Republic) Jan Vonka (Belgium) Armand Fumal (Austria) Manfred Jurasz | Porsche 911 GT3-R | D | 47 |
| 20 DNF | GT2 | 56 | (Czech Republic) Czech National Team | (Czech Republic) Jan Vonka (Belgium) Armand Fumal (Austria) Manfred Jurasz | Porsche 3.6L Flat-6 | D | 47 |
| 21 DNF | GT1 | 4 | (Germany) Konrad Motorsport | (Czech Republic) Adam Lacko (Austria) Franz Konrad | Saleen S7-R | P | 45 |
| 21 DNF | GT1 | 4 | (Germany) Konrad Motorsport | (Czech Republic) Adam Lacko (Austria) Franz Konrad | Ford 7.0L V8 | P | 45 |
| 22 DNF | GT2 | 66 | (United Kingdom) GruppeM Racing | (Germany) Marc Lieb (Germany) Mike Rockenfeller | Porsche 911 GT3-RSR | MI | 38 |
| 22 DNF | GT2 | 66 | (United Kingdom) GruppeM Racing | (Germany) Marc Lieb (Germany) Mike Rockenfeller | Porsche 3.6L Flat-6 | MI | 38 |
| 23 DNF | GT2 | 97 | (Netherlands) Lammertink Racing | (Germany) Wolfgang Kaufmann (Italy) Luca Moro | Porsche 911 GT3-RSR | MI | 32 |
| 23 DNF | GT2 | 97 | (Netherlands) Lammertink Racing | (Germany) Wolfgang Kaufmann (Italy) Luca Moro | Porsche 3.6L Flat-6 | MI | 32 |
| 24 DNF | GT1 | 3 | (Italy) GPC Sport | (Italy) Marco Cioci (Italy) Andrea Montermini | Ferrari 575-GTC Maranello | P | 17 |
| 24 DNF | GT1 | 3 | (Italy) GPC Sport | (Italy) Marco Cioci (Italy) Andrea Montermini | Ferrari 6.0L V12 | P | 17 |
| 25 DNF | GT1 | 5 | (Germany) Konrad Motorsport | (Austria) Robert Lechner (Italy) Paolo Ruberti | Saleen S7-R | P | 17 |
| 25 DNF | GT1 | 5 | (Germany) Konrad Motorsport | (Austria) Robert Lechner (Italy) Paolo Ruberti | Ford 7.0L V8 | P | 17 |
| 26 DNF | GT2 | 86 | (Italy) GPC Sport | (Italy) Luca Drudi (Italy) Gabrio Rosa (Italy) Marco Lambertini | Ferrari 360 Modena GTC | P | 10 |
| 26 DNF | GT2 | 86 | (Italy) GPC Sport | (Italy) Luca Drudi (Italy) Gabrio Rosa (Italy) Marco Lambertini | Ferrari 3.6L V8 | P | 10 |

== Statistics ==
- Pole Position – #17 Russian Age Racing – 1:55.215
- Fastest Lap – #11 Larbre Compétition – 1:56.015
- Average Speed – 159.030 km/h

FIA GT Championship
| Previous race: 2005 FIA GT Zhuhai Supercar 500 | 2005 season | Next race: 2005 FIA GT Bahrain Supercar 500 |
