= 1993 Italian Grand Prix =

- Race 13 of 16 in the 1993 Formula One World Championship
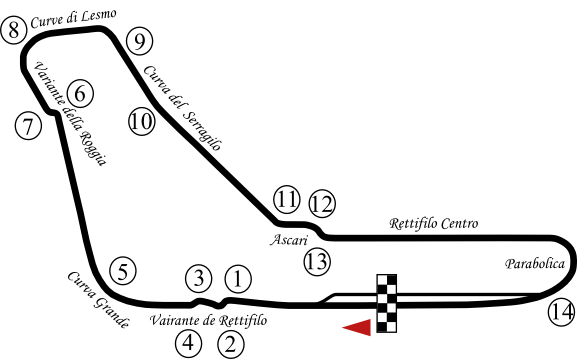

Race details
- Date: 12 September 1993
- Official name: Pioneer 64º Gran Premio d'Italia
- Location: Autodromo Nazionale di Monza; Monza, Lombardy, Italy
- Course: Permanent racing facility
- Course length: 5.800 km (3.604 miles)
- Distance: 53 laps, 307.400 km (191.01 miles)
- Weather: Hot and sunny

Pole position
| Driver | (France) Alain Prost | Williams-Renault |
- Time: 1:21.179

Fastest lap
| Driver | (United Kingdom) Damon Hill | Williams-Renault |
- Time: 1:23.575 on lap 45

Podium
| First | (United Kingdom) Damon Hill | Williams-Renault |
| Second | (France) Jean Alesi | Ferrari |
| Third | (United States) Michael Andretti | McLaren-Ford |

The 1993 Italian Grand Prix (formally the Pioneer 64º Gran Premio d'Italia) was a Formula One motor race held at Monza on 12 September 1993. It was the thirteenth race of the 1993 Formula One World Championship.

The 53-lap race was won by British driver Damon Hill, driving a Williams-Renault, after he started from second position. Frenchman Jean Alesi finished second in a Ferrari, while American Michael Andretti finished third in a McLaren-Ford, in his final F1 race before returning to IndyCar. Hill's teammate, Frenchman Alain Prost, took pole position and led until suffering an engine failure with five laps to go, allowing Hill to take his third consecutive victory.

== Report ==
The Williams cars dominated qualifying, locking out the front row of the grid with Alain Prost on pole and Damon Hill alongside him. Jean Alesi took third in his Ferrari; he was joined on the second row by Ayrton Senna in the McLaren. Michael Schumacher in the Benetton and Gerhard Berger in the second Ferrari made up the third row. Further down the grid, Pedro Lamy was making his Grand Prix debut for the cash-strapped Lotus outfit, taking the place of the injured Alessandro Zanardi, while the Jordan team, needing a replacement for Thierry Boutsen following the Belgian's retirement from F1, had decided to evaluate Japanese Formula 3000 driver Marco Apicella, after their test driver Emanuele Naspetti had turned down the opportunity to race.

At the start, Alesi got ahead of a sluggish Hill and Senna tried to do the same, but there was contact between Hill and Senna, resulting in both drivers dropping back, with Senna ending up in 9th and Hill in 10th. Further back, two separate incidents saw five cars eliminated at the first chicane. In the first incident, the Footworks of Derek Warwick and Aguri Suzuki collided and took each other out. In the second incident, Sauber driver JJ Lehto, who had to start from the back of the grid, took himself and the Jordans of Rubens Barrichello and Apicella out of the race. Apicella's debut, which would also turn out to be his only Grand Prix start, had lasted no more than 800 metres, unofficially making him the driver with one of the shortest careers in Formula One. Prost led Alesi, Schumacher, Berger, Johnny Herbert and Martin Brundle into lap 2. On lap 4 Schumacher passed Alesi to take second position.

On lap 8, Senna collided with Brundle's Ligier, putting them both out. Prost's championship ambitions received a major boost with Senna's retirement. Johnny Herbert spun off and hit the tyre barriers at Parabolica as he retired from 5th position since Berger pitted for tyres on lap 15, putting Berger back in 5th position but soon retired from 5th position with suspension problems 1 lap later. Hill in the meantime had moved up to fourth place and passed Alesi for third on lap 10, as Blundell in the remaining Ligier like Herbert had clipped the barrier at Parabolica and retired with a left-rear puncture and damaging his left-rear suspension on lap 21 whilst battling Wendlinger for 7th. Before Hill moved up to second on lap 22 when Schumacher's engine failed. At this point, Prost led by nearly 20 seconds, but by lap 48 Hill had reduced this lead to two seconds. Then, on lap 49, five from the end, the Renault engine in Prost's car blew. Hill took his third consecutive win by 40 seconds from Alesi, with Michael Andretti third (achieving his only podium) and Karl Wendlinger, Riccardo Patrese (scoring his final points in F1) and Érik Comas completing the top six.

The Minardis of Pierluigi Martini and Christian Fittipaldi had approached the chequered flag with Fittipaldi closely following Martini. Fittipaldi's left front wheel made contact with his teammate's right rear wheel, and the contact launched Fittipaldi's car into the air. The car completed a back flip before landing back on its wheels and skidded across the line. Neither driver was hurt and both finished the race without losing a position.

This was the Williams team's seventh consecutive victory. Prior to the race weekend, Andretti and McLaren mutually agreed to part ways and that this would be his final race with the team. He would be replaced by the team's test driver, Mika Häkkinen. His final Formula One race returned his best result of the season with his third-place finish. By winning in Italy, Hill became the first Formula One driver to take their first three wins at consecutive Grands Prix, a feat only that has only been repeated twice, by Mika Häkkinen and Kimi Antonelli.

As of 2025, Andretti's podium finish remains the last for an American driver in Formula One.

== Classification ==
=== Qualifying ===
| Pos | No | Driver | Constructor | Q1 | Q2 | Gap |
|---|---|---|---|---|---|---|
| 1 | 2 | (France) Alain Prost | Williams-Renault | 1:22.163 | 1:21.179 | |
| 2 | 0 | (United Kingdom) Damon Hill | Williams-Renault | 1:22.283 | 1:21.491 | +0.318 |
| 3 | 27 | (France) Jean Alesi | Ferrari | 1:22.625 | 1:21.986 | +0.807 |
| 4 | 8 | (Brazil) Ayrton Senna | McLaren-Ford | 1:23.310 | 1:22.633 | +1.454 |
| 5 | 5 | (Germany) Michael Schumacher | Benetton-Ford | 1:23.888 | 1:22.910 | +1.731 |
| 6 | 28 | (Austria) Gerhard Berger | Ferrari | 1:23.750 | 1:23.150 | +1.971 |
| 7 | 12 | (United Kingdom) Johnny Herbert | Lotus-Ford | 1:25.463 | 1:23.769 | +2.590 |
| 8 | 10 | (Japan) Aguri Suzuki | Footwork-Mugen-Honda | 1:26.127 | 1:23.856 | +2.677 |
| 9 | 7 | (United States) Michael Andretti | McLaren-Ford | 1:25.348 | 1:23.899 | +2.720 |
| 10 | 6 | (Italy) Riccardo Patrese | Benetton-Ford | 1:26.082 | 1:23.918 | +2.739 |
| 11 | 9 | (United Kingdom) Derek Warwick | Footwork-Mugen-Honda | 1:24.673 | 1:24.048 | +2.869 |
| 12 | 25 | (United Kingdom) Martin Brundle | Ligier-Renault | 1:24.608 | 1:24.137 | +2.958 |
| 13 | 30 | (Finland) JJ Lehto | Sauber | 1:24.298 | 1:24.419 | +3.119 |
| 14 | 26 | (United Kingdom) Mark Blundell | Ligier-Renault | 1:25.238 | 1:24.344 | +3.165 |
| 15 | 29 | (Austria) Karl Wendlinger | Sauber | 1:25.016 | 1:24.473 | +3.294 |
| 16 | 19 | (France) Philippe Alliot | Larrousse-Lamborghini | 1:25.529 | 1:24.807 | +3.628 |
| 17 | 3 | (Japan) Ukyo Katayama | Tyrrell-Yamaha | 1:26.300 | 1:24.886 | +3.707 |
| 18 | 4 | (Italy) Andrea de Cesaris | Tyrrell-Yamaha | 1:25.482 | 1:24.916 | +3.737 |
| 19 | 14 | (Brazil) Rubens Barrichello | Jordan-Hart | 1:26.664 | 1:25.144 | +3.965 |
| 20 | 20 | (France) Érik Comas | Larrousse-Lamborghini | 1:26.323 | 1:25.257 | +4.078 |
| 21 | 21 | (Italy) Michele Alboreto | Lola-Ferrari | 1:26.287 | 1:25.368 | +4.189 |
| 22 | 24 | (Italy) Pierluigi Martini | Minardi-Ford | 1:25.903 | 1:25.478 | +4.299 |
| 23 | 15 | (Italy) Marco Apicella | Jordan-Hart | 1:51.300 | 1:25.672 | +4.493 |
| 24 | 23 | (Brazil) Christian Fittipaldi | Minardi-Ford | 1:26.135 | 1:25.699 | +4.520 |
| 25 | 22 | (Italy) Luca Badoer | Lola-Ferrari | 1:26.049 | 1:25.957 | +4.778 |
| 26 | 11 | (Portugal) Pedro Lamy | Lotus-Ford | 1:26.380 | 1:26.324 | +5.145 |

=== Race ===
| Pos | No | Driver | Constructor | Laps | Time/Retired | Grid | Points |
|---|---|---|---|---|---|---|---|
| 1 | 0 | (United Kingdom) Damon Hill | Williams-Renault | 53 | 1:17:07.509 | 2 | 10 |
| 2 | 27 | (France) Jean Alesi | Ferrari | 53 | + 40.012 | 3 | 6 |
| 3 | 7 | (United States) Michael Andretti | McLaren-Ford | 52 | + 1 lap | 9 | 4 |
| 4 | 29 | (Austria) Karl Wendlinger | Sauber | 52 | + 1 lap | 15 | 3 |
| 5 | 6 | (Italy) Riccardo Patrese | Benetton-Ford | 52 | + 1 lap | 10 | 2 |
| 6 | 20 | (France) Érik Comas | Larrousse-Lamborghini | 52 | + 1 lap | 20 | 1 |
| 7 | 24 | (Italy) Pierluigi Martini | Minardi-Ford | 51 | + 2 laps | 22 | |
| 8 | 23 | (Brazil) Christian Fittipaldi | Minardi-Ford | 51 | + 2 laps | 24 | |
| 9 | 19 | (France) Philippe Alliot | Larrousse-Lamborghini | 51 | + 2 laps | 16 | |
| 10 | 22 | (Italy) Luca Badoer | Lola-Ferrari | 51 | + 2 laps | 25 | |
| 11 | 11 | (Portugal) Pedro Lamy | Lotus-Ford | 49 | Electrical | 26 | |
| 12 | 2 | (France) Alain Prost | Williams-Renault | 48 | Engine | 1 | |
| 13 | 4 | (Italy) Andrea de Cesaris | Tyrrell-Yamaha | 47 | Oil pressure | 18 | |
| 14 | 3 | (Japan) Ukyo Katayama | Tyrrell-Yamaha | 47 | + 6 laps | 17 | |
| Ret | 21 | (Italy) Michele Alboreto | Lola-Ferrari | 23 | Suspension | 21 | |
| Ret | 5 | (Germany) Michael Schumacher | Benetton-Ford | 21 | Engine | 5 | |
| Ret | 26 | (United Kingdom) Mark Blundell | Ligier-Renault | 20 | Accident damage | 14 | |
| Ret | 28 | (Austria) Gerhard Berger | Ferrari | 15 | Suspension | 6 | |
| Ret | 12 | (United Kingdom) Johnny Herbert | Lotus-Ford | 14 | Spun off | 7 | |
| Ret | 25 | (United Kingdom) Martin Brundle | Ligier-Renault | 8 | Collision | 12 | |
| Ret | 8 | (Brazil) Ayrton Senna | McLaren-Ford | 8 | Collision | 4 | |
| Ret | 10 | (Japan) Aguri Suzuki | Footwork-Mugen-Honda | 0 | Collision | 8 | |
| Ret | 9 | (United Kingdom) Derek Warwick | Footwork-Mugen-Honda | 0 | Collision | 11 | |
| Ret | 30 | (Finland) JJ Lehto | Sauber | 0 | Collision | 13 | |
| Ret | 14 | (Brazil) Rubens Barrichello | Jordan-Hart | 0 | Collision | 19 | |
| Ret | 15 | (Italy) Marco Apicella | Jordan-Hart | 0 | Collision | 23 | |

== Championship standings after the race ==
Drivers' Championship standings

| | Pos | Driver | Points |
|---|---|---|---|
| | 1 | (France) **Alain Prost*** | 81 |
| 1 | 2 | (United Kingdom) **Damon Hill*** | 58 |
| 1 | 3 | (Brazil) **Ayrton Senna*** | 53 |
| | 4 | (Germany) Michael Schumacher | 42 |
| | 5 | (Italy) Riccardo Patrese | 20 |

Constructors' Championship standings

| Pos | Constructor | Points |
|---|---|---|
| 1 | (United Kingdom) **Williams-Renault** | 139 |
| 2 | (United Kingdom) Benetton-Ford | 62 |
| 3 | (United Kingdom) McLaren-Ford | 60 |
| 4 | (France) Ligier-Renault | 21 |
| 5 | (Italy) Ferrari | 20 |

- Note: Only the top five positions are included for both sets of standings.
- **Bold text** indicates the 1993 World Constructors' Champions.
- Competitors in bold and marked with an asterisk still had a mathematical chance of becoming World Champion.

| Previous race: 1993 Belgian Grand Prix | FIA Formula One World Championship; 1993 season | Next race: 1993 Portuguese Grand Prix |
| Previous race: 1992 Italian Grand Prix | Italian Grand Prix | Next race: 1994 Italian Grand Prix |
