= André de Cortanze =

French motorsport engineer (born 1941)

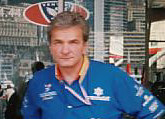
- De Cortanze at the 1996 Monaco Grand Prix.
- Born: 30 March 1941 (age 85)

André de Cortanze (born 30 March 1941) is a French motorsport engineer.

== Career ==
De Cortanze graduated in 1967 with an engineering degree and joined Alpine, a car manufacturer, where he drove and designed racing cars.

He also experienced success in Formula Three and Formula Two and designed a test chassis for Renault's initial foray into Formula One.

In the 1980s, he moved to Peugeot Talbot Sport as Technical Director, enjoying victories in rallying and Le Mans.

In 1993, he moved to the new Sauber F1 team, where he helped design the Sauber C13 and was an engineer at the team during the 1994 Formula One season.

At the start of the season, he was joined by Tim Wright. Wright was only there for a year. At the end of 1995, he moved to Ligier, but then moved to Toyota Europe when the team was sold to Alain Prost.

He then designed the 1998–1999 Toyota TS020 (GT-One) that entered the 24 Hours of Le Mans.

In 2000 he became the initial Technical Director of the Toyota F1 team, working with aerodynamicist Robert Choulet.

He was the Technical Director of the Pescarolo Sport team.

In 1978 de Cortanze designed a revolutionary 750cc motorcycle which had no orthodox frame. The engine became the frame, with both wheels and suspension being attached to it. The project was financed by French state owned oil company Elf Aquitaine with de Cortanze being the chief designer of the bike. The bike was characterised by kingpin steering with no direct connection between the handlebar and the wheel hub but a steering with a track rod that required an up and down movement of the handlebar for cornering. The car-like front hub was mounted on a single sided parallel leading arm suspension eliminating any tendency for nose diving under braking. The bike also had no conventional frame but attached the steering head to the front of the engine and the single sided swing arm to the rear with no frame in between. To put the centre of gravity as low as possible the fuel tank was located under the engine so the exhaust had to be run on top of the engine under the fairing. The project was run on a shoestring budget and regarding these circumstances the bikes were astonishingly successful and created the attention Elf Aquitaine had desired.
