= 1993 Portuguese Grand Prix =

- Race 14 of 16 in the 1993 Formula One World Championship
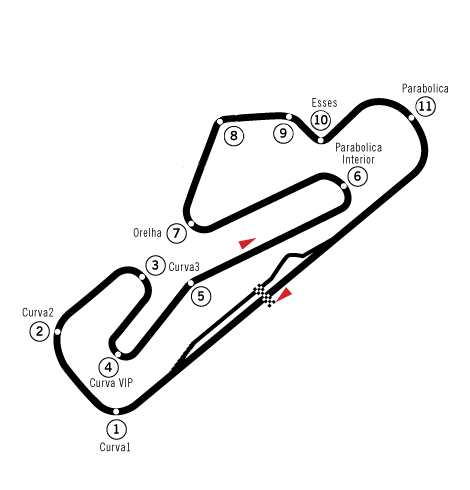

Race details
- Date: 26 September 1993
- Official name: XXII Grande Premio de Portugal
- Location: Autódromo do Estoril; Estoril, Portugal
- Course: Permanent racing facility
- Course length: 4.349 km (2.703 miles)
- Distance: 71 laps, 308.779 km (191.913 miles)
- Weather: Dry, sunny, windy

Pole position
Driver	(United Kingdom) Damon Hill	Williams-Renault
- Time: 1:11.494

Fastest lap
Driver	(United Kingdom) Damon Hill	Williams-Renault
- Time: 1:14.859 on lap 68

Podium
First	(Germany) Michael Schumacher	Benetton-Ford
Second	(France) Alain Prost	Williams-Renault
Third	(United Kingdom) Damon Hill	Williams-Renault

The 1993 Portuguese Grand Prix was a Formula One motor race held at Estoril on 26 September 1993. It was the fourteenth race of the 1993 Formula One World Championship.

The 71-lap race was won by German driver Michael Schumacher, driving a Benetton-Ford. Frenchman Alain Prost finished second in his Williams-Renault, a result which secured him his fourth Drivers' Championship. Prost's British teammate Damon Hill finished third, having taken pole position before stalling on the dummy grid and having to start from the back.

The BMS Scuderia Italia team withdrew from the championship after this race. As a result of this the Formula One involvement of their chassis supplier and technical partner Lola was also ended with immediate effect until they made a brief ill-fated return with their own team at the 1997 Australian Grand Prix where they failed to qualify. Thus, this make the 1993 Portuguese Grand Prix the last time a Lola chassis actually started a Grand Prix.

== Background ==
In between the Italian and Portuguese Grands Prix, Michael Andretti left Formula One to return to the United States, his McLaren seat being taken by Mika Häkkinen. On the Friday before the Portuguese race, Alain Prost announced his retirement from Formula One at the end of the season, with Ayrton Senna set to take his place at Williams alongside Damon Hill.

== Qualifying report ==
Once again, the Williams-Renaults filled the front row of the grid, but on this occasion Hill took pole position from Prost by just under 0.2 seconds. Häkkinen was third in the McLaren, surprisingly ahead of teammate Senna by just under 0.05 seconds, with Jean Alesi fifth in the Ferrari and Michael Schumacher sixth in the Benetton. Riccardo Patrese was seventh in the second Benetton and Gerhard Berger eighth in the second Ferrari, with Derek Warwick in the Footwork and Mark Blundell in the Ligier completing the top ten.

=== Qualifying classification ===
Pos	No	Driver	Constructor	Q1	Q2	Gap
1	0	(United Kingdom) Damon Hill	Williams-Renault	1:12.290	1:11.494	
2	2	(France) Alain Prost	Williams-Renault	1:11.683	1:12.762	+0.189
3	7	(Finland) Mika Häkkinen	McLaren-Ford	1:12.956	1:12.443	+0.949
4	8	(Brazil) Ayrton Senna	McLaren-Ford	1:12.954	1:12.491	+0.997
5	27	(France) Jean Alesi	Ferrari	1:13.682	1:13.101	+1.607
6	5	(Germany) Michael Schumacher	Benetton-Ford	1:13.403	1:14.135	+1.909
7	6	(Italy) Riccardo Patrese	Benetton-Ford	1:14.206	1:13.863	+2.369
8	28	(Austria) Gerhard Berger	Ferrari	1:14.159	1:13.933	+2.439
9	9	(United Kingdom) Derek Warwick	Footwork-Mugen-Honda	1:15.200	1:14.388	+2.894
10	26	(United Kingdom) Mark Blundell	Ligier-Renault	1:14.591	1:14.577	+3.083
11	25	(United Kingdom) Martin Brundle	Ligier-Renault	1:14.779	1:14.708	+3.214
12	30	(Finland) JJ Lehto	Sauber	1:14.978	1:14.833	+3.339
13	29	(Austria) Karl Wendlinger	Sauber	1:15.016	1:15.070	+3.522
14	12	(United Kingdom) Johnny Herbert	Lotus-Ford	1:15.831	1:15.183	+3.689
15	14	(Brazil) Rubens Barrichello	Jordan-Hart	1:15.479	1:15.433	+3.939
16	10	(Japan) Aguri Suzuki	Footwork-Mugen-Honda	1:15.968	1:15.491	+3.997
17	4	(Italy) Andrea de Cesaris	Tyrrell-Yamaha	1:16.072	1:15.904	+4.410
18	11	(Portugal) Pedro Lamy	Lotus-Ford	1:17.198	1:15.920	+4.426
19	24	(Italy) Pierluigi Martini	Minardi-Ford	1:15.942	1:16.323	+4.448
20	19	(France) Philippe Alliot	Larrousse-Lamborghini	1:16.777	1:16.144	+4.650
21	3	(Japan) Ukyo Katayama	Tyrrell-Yamaha	1:16.655	1:16.186	+4.692
22	20	(France) Érik Comas	Larrousse-Lamborghini	1:16.417	1:16.998	+4.923
23	15	(Italy) Emanuele Naspetti	Jordan-Hart	1:17.845	1:16.566	+5.072
24	23	(Brazil) Christian Fittipaldi	Minardi-Ford	1:16.651	1:16.864	+5.157
25	21	(Italy) Michele Alboreto	Lola-Ferrari	1:17.778	1:17.118	+5.624
26	22	(Italy) Luca Badoer	Lola-Ferrari	1:19.064	1:17.739	+6.245

== Race report ==
Hill's engine refused to fire on the parade lap and he had to start at the back. At the start, Prost got squeezed out by the McLarens and Alesi, with Alesi getting ahead of the McLarens with Senna ahead of Häkkinen. Alesi led Senna, Häkkinen, Prost, Schumacher and Berger.

The top six stayed together but the Williamses and Schumacher were on a one-stop strategy unlike the McLarens and Ferraris. On lap 20, Senna's engine blew as Alesi, Häkkinen and Schumacher pitted, with Alesi losing out to both. This left Prost leading from Blundell, Hill, Häkkinen, Schumacher and Alesi. Schumacher passed Häkkinen on lap 25 and pulled away. Prost would stop on lap 29 but Schumacher would rejoin ahead. When Hill stopped as well, Schumacher was leading from Prost, Häkkinen, Hill, Alesi and Berger.

On lap 33, Häkkinen crashed into the wall at the last corner. Three laps later, Berger's suspension failed dramatically at the exit of the pitlane, sending him across the start-finish straight, being nearly hit by a Footwork. Blundell crashed from sixth on lap 52 as Prost began to hassle Schumacher. However, second place was enough for Prost to win the championship, so the French driver did not take any risks. Patrese was fifth but he too crashed on lap 64 into the Footwork of Derek Warwick forcing both drivers to retire. Schumacher had a minor off but still just kept his lead. Schumacher won from new World Champion Prost, Hill, Alesi, Wendlinger and Brundle.

With only two more races to go, Prost was the World Champion with 87 points but there was battle for second between Hill, Senna and Schumacher. Hill was second with 62, Senna was third with 53 and Schumacher was fourth with 52. Behind, Patrese was fifth with 20, Alesi was sixth with 13, Brundle was seventh with 12 and Herbert was eighth with 11. In the Constructors Championship, Williams were the World Champions with 149 points but there was a battle for second between Benetton with 72 and McLaren with 60. Ferrari were fourth with 23.

=== Race classification ===
Pos	No	Driver	Constructor	Laps	Time/Retired	Grid	Points
1	5	(Germany) Michael Schumacher	Benetton-Ford	71	1:32:46.309	6	10
2	2	(France) Alain Prost	Williams-Renault	71	+ 0.982	2	6
3	0	(United Kingdom) Damon Hill	Williams-Renault	71	+ 8.206	1	4
4	27	(France) Jean Alesi	Ferrari	71	+ 1:07.605	5	3
5	29	(Austria) Karl Wendlinger	Sauber	70	+ 1 lap	13	2
6	25	(United Kingdom) Martin Brundle	Ligier-Renault	70	+ 1 lap	11	1
7	30	(Finland) JJ Lehto	Sauber	69	+ 2 laps	12	
8	24	(Italy) Pierluigi Martini	Minardi-Ford	69	+ 2 laps	19	
9	23	(Brazil) Christian Fittipaldi	Minardi-Ford	69	+ 2 laps	24	
10	19	(France) Philippe Alliot	Larrousse-Lamborghini	69	+ 2 laps	20	
11	20	(France) Érik Comas	Larrousse-Lamborghini	68	+ 3 laps	22	
12	4	(Italy) Andrea de Cesaris	Tyrrell-Yamaha	68	+ 3 laps	17	
13	14	(Brazil) Rubens Barrichello	Jordan-Hart	68	+ 3 laps	15	
14	22	(Italy) Luca Badoer	Lola-Ferrari	68	+ 3 laps	26	
15	9	(United Kingdom) Derek Warwick	Footwork-Mugen-Honda	63	Collision	9	
16	6	(Italy) Riccardo Patrese	Benetton-Ford	63	Collision	7	
Ret	11	(Portugal) Pedro Lamy	Lotus-Ford	61	Spun off	18	
Ret	12	(United Kingdom) Johnny Herbert	Lotus-Ford	60	Spun off	14	
Ret	26	(United Kingdom) Mark Blundell	Ligier-Renault	51	Collision	10	
Ret	21	(Italy) Michele Alboreto	Lola-Ferrari	38	Gearbox	25	
Ret	28	(Austria) Gerhard Berger	Ferrari	35	Suspension/accident	8	
Ret	7	(Finland) Mika Häkkinen	McLaren-Ford	32	Accident	3	
Ret	10	(Japan) Aguri Suzuki	Footwork-Mugen-Honda	27	Gearbox	16	
Ret	8	(Brazil) Ayrton Senna	McLaren-Ford	19	Engine	4	
Ret	3	(Japan) Ukyo Katayama	Tyrrell-Yamaha	12	Spun off	21	
Ret	15	(Italy) Emanuele Naspetti	Jordan-Hart	8	Engine	23	

== Championship standings after the race ==
Drivers' Championship standings

Pos	Driver	Points
1	(France) **Alain Prost**	87
2	(United Kingdom) Damon Hill	62
3	(Brazil) Ayrton Senna	53
4	(Germany) Michael Schumacher	52
5	(Italy) Riccardo Patrese	20

Constructors' Championship standings

	Pos	Constructor	Points
	1	(United Kingdom) **Williams-Renault**	149
	2	(United Kingdom) Benetton-Ford	72
	3	(United Kingdom) McLaren-Ford	60
1	4	(Italy) Ferrari	23
1	5	(France) Ligier-Renault	22

- Note: Only the top five positions are included for both sets of standings.
- **Bold text** indicates the 1993 World Champions.

Previous race: 1993 Italian Grand Prix	FIA Formula One World Championship; 1993 season	Next race: 1993 Japanese Grand Prix
Previous race: 1992 Portuguese Grand Prix	Portuguese Grand Prix	Next race: 1994 Portuguese Grand Prix
