= 1994 Portuguese Grand Prix =

- Race 13 of 16 in the 1994 Formula One World Championship
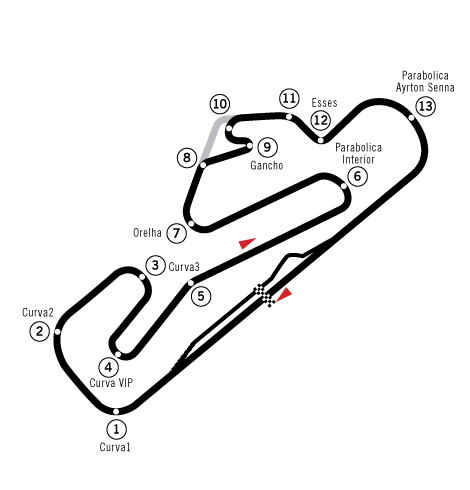

Race details
- Date: 25 September 1994
- Official name: XXIII Grande Premio de Portugal
- Location: Autódromo do Estoril; Estoril, Portugal
- Course: Permanent racing facility
- Course length: 4.360 km (2.725 miles)
- Distance: 71 laps, 309.560 km (193.475 miles)
- Weather: Sunny

Pole position
Driver	(Austria) Gerhard Berger	Ferrari
- Time: 1:20.608

Fastest lap
Driver	(United Kingdom) David Coulthard	Williams-Renault
- Time: 1:22.446 on lap 12

Podium
First	(United Kingdom) Damon Hill	Williams-Renault
Second	(United Kingdom) David Coulthard	Williams-Renault
Third	(Finland) Mika Häkkinen	McLaren-Peugeot

The 1994 Portuguese Grand Prix (formally the XXIII Grande Premio de Portugal) was a Formula One motor race held at Estoril on 25 September 1994. It was the thirteenth race of the 1994 Formula One World Championship.

The 71-lap race was won by Briton Damon Hill, driving a Williams-Renault. Teammate David Coulthard finished second, achieving his first podium finish, with Finn Mika Häkkinen third in a McLaren-Peugeot. The win, Hill's fifth of the season and third in succession, enabled him to move within one point of Drivers' Championship leader, German Michael Schumacher, while the 1–2 finish allowed Williams to take over the lead of the Constructors' Championship from Benetton.

As of 2026, this is the last race in Formula One history not to feature an active World Drivers' Champion on the grid.

== Background ==
With Michael Schumacher still banned, the Benetton team continued to run JJ Lehto alongside Jos Verstappen, while the financially-troubled Lotus team brought back Philippe Adams to partner Johnny Herbert.

== Qualifying report ==
During the Friday qualifying session, Eddie Irvine spun his Jordan and in the process collided with Damon Hill's Williams. Hill's car flipped upside down, but he escaped unhurt. Irvine was warned a similar incident would see his Super Licence revoked.

Gerhard Berger took pole position, his second of the season and the third for Ferrari, by 0.158 seconds from Hill. On the second row of the grid were David Coulthard in the other Williams and Mika Häkkinen in the McLaren, and on the third row were Jean Alesi in the other Ferrari and Ukyo Katayama in the Tyrrell. The top ten was completed by Martin Brundle in the other McLaren, Rubens Barrichello in the other Jordan, Heinz-Harald Frentzen in the Sauber, and Verstappen. Once again, the Pacifics of Bertrand Gachot and Paul Belmondo were the two non-qualifiers.

=== Qualifying classification ===
Pos	No	Driver	Constructor	Q1 Time	Q2 Time	Gap
1	28	(Austria) Gerhard Berger	Ferrari	1:20.608	1:21.863	
2	0	(United Kingdom) Damon Hill	Williams-Renault	1:20.803	1:20.766	+0.158
3	2	(United Kingdom) David Coulthard	Williams-Renault	1:21.120	1:21.033	+0.425
4	7	(Finland) Mika Häkkinen	McLaren-Peugeot	1:21.251	1:21.700	+0.643
5	27	(France) Jean Alesi	Ferrari	1:21.517	1:22.086	+0.909
6	3	(Japan) Ukyo Katayama	Tyrrell-Yamaha	1:21.590	4:03.441	+0.982
7	8	(United Kingdom) Martin Brundle	McLaren-Peugeot	1:21.656	1:22.035	+1.048
8	14	(Brazil) Rubens Barrichello	Jordan-Hart	1:21.839	1:21.796	+1.188
9	30	(Germany) Heinz-Harald Frentzen	Sauber-Mercedes	1:22.795	1:21.921	+1.313
10	6	(Netherlands) Jos Verstappen	Benetton-Ford	1:22.614	1:22.000	+1.392
11	9	(Brazil) Christian Fittipaldi	Footwork-Ford	1:22.636	1:22.132	+1.524
12	4	(United Kingdom) Mark Blundell	Tyrrell-Yamaha	1:22.288	1:22.971	+1.680
13	15	(United Kingdom) Eddie Irvine	Jordan-Hart	1:23.411	1:22.294	+1.686
14	5	(Finland) JJ Lehto	Benetton-Ford	1:22.613	1:22.369	+1.761
15	26	(France) Olivier Panis	Ligier-Renault	1:23.711	1:22.672	+2.064
16	10	(Italy) Gianni Morbidelli	Footwork-Ford	1:22.974	1:22.756	+2.148
17	29	(Italy) Andrea de Cesaris	Sauber-Mercedes	1:22.885	1:22.888	+2.277
18	23	(Italy) Pierluigi Martini	Minardi-Ford	1:23.243	1:23.464	+2.635
19	24	(Italy) Michele Alboreto	Minardi-Ford	1:23.364	1:24.186	+2.756
20	12	(United Kingdom) Johnny Herbert	Lotus-Mugen-Honda	no time	1:23.408	+2.800
21	25	(France) Éric Bernard	Ligier-Renault	1:25.039	1:23.699	+3.091
22	20	(France) Érik Comas	Larrousse-Ford	1:24.192	1:24.306	+3.584
23	19	(France) Yannick Dalmas	Larrousse-Ford	1:24.438	1:24.920	+3.830
24	31	(Australia) David Brabham	Simtek-Ford	1:24.527	1:24.514	+3.906
25	11	(Belgium) Philippe Adams	Lotus-Mugen-Honda	1:25.313	1:25.708	+4.705
26	32	(France) Jean-Marc Gounon	Simtek-Ford	1:25.686	1:25.649	+5.041
DNQ	34	(France) Bertrand Gachot	Pacific-Ilmor	1:27.960	1:27.385	+6.777
DNQ	33	(France) Paul Belmondo	Pacific-Ilmor	1:32.706	1:29.000	+8.392

== Race report ==
Gerhard Berger led in the early stages for Ferrari, ahead of Coulthard who had got ahead of Hill on the start. Berger retired on lap 8 with his gearbox failed, and Katayama's gearbox also failed by lap 27, which promoted Rubens Barrichello into the points for Jordan. Coulthard ran wide whilst trying to lap a backmarker on lap 33 which allowed Hill to edge ahead of the Scotsman. By lap 39 the other Ferrari of Jean Alesi had retired after colliding with the Simtek of David Brabham while trying to lap him. Soon afterwards, Jos Verstappen was able to pass Martin Brundle's McLaren for 5th. Damon Hill went on to take his third consecutive race win, ahead of Coulthard. The 1-2 finish gave Williams the lead in the Constructors Championship. Mika Hakkinen finished third for McLaren, Barrichello 4th for Jordan, Verstappen 5th for Benetton and Martin Brundle 6th in the second McLaren. Olivier Panis originally finished 9th but was disqualified for having illegal skidblock wear.

=== Race classification ===
Pos	No	Driver	Constructor	Laps	Time/Retired	Grid	Points
1	0	(United Kingdom) Damon Hill	Williams-Renault	71	1:45:10.146	2	10
2	2	(United Kingdom) David Coulthard	Williams-Renault	71	+ 0.603	3	6
3	7	(Finland) Mika Häkkinen	McLaren-Peugeot	71	+ 20.193	4	4
4	14	(Brazil) Rubens Barrichello	Jordan-Hart	71	+ 28.003	8	3
5	6	(Netherlands) Jos Verstappen	Benetton-Ford	71	+ 29.385	10	2
6	8	(United Kingdom) Martin Brundle	McLaren-Peugeot	71	+ 52.702	7	1
7	15	(United Kingdom) Eddie Irvine	Jordan-Hart	70	+ 1 lap	13	
8	9	(Brazil) Christian Fittipaldi	Footwork-Ford	70	+ 1 lap	11	
9	10	(Italy) Gianni Morbidelli	Footwork-Ford	70	+ 1 lap	16	
10	25	(France) Éric Bernard	Ligier-Renault	70	+ 1 lap	21	
11	12	(United Kingdom) Johnny Herbert	Lotus-Mugen-Honda	70	+ 1 lap	20	
12	23	(Italy) Pierluigi Martini	Minardi-Ford	69	+ 2 laps	18	
13	24	(Italy) Michele Alboreto	Minardi-Ford	69	+ 2 laps	19	
14	19	(France) Yannick Dalmas	Larrousse-Ford	69	+ 2 laps	23	
15	32	(France) Jean-Marc Gounon	Simtek-Ford	67	+ 4 laps	26	
16	11	(Belgium) Philippe Adams	Lotus-Mugen-Honda	67	+ 4 laps	25	
Ret	4	(United Kingdom) Mark Blundell	Tyrrell-Yamaha	61	Engine	12	
Ret	5	(Finland) JJ Lehto	Benetton-Ford	60	Spun off	14	
Ret	29	(Italy) Andrea de Cesaris	Sauber-Mercedes	54	Spun off	17	
Ret	27	(France) Jean Alesi	Ferrari	38	Collision	5	
Ret	31	(Australia) David Brabham	Simtek-Ford	36	Collision	24	
Ret	30	(Germany) Heinz-Harald Frentzen	Sauber-Mercedes	31	Differential	9	
Ret	20	(France) Érik Comas	Larrousse-Ford	27	Suspension	22	
Ret	3	(Japan) Ukyo Katayama	Tyrrell-Yamaha	26	Gearbox	6	
Ret	28	(Austria) Gerhard Berger	Ferrari	7	Gearbox	1	
DSQ	26	(France) Olivier Panis	Ligier-Renault	70	Illegal skid block	15	

== Championship standings after the race ==
Drivers' Championship standings

Pos	Driver	Points
1	(Germany) Michael Schumacher	76
2	(United Kingdom) Damon Hill	75
3	(Austria) Gerhard Berger	33
4	(Finland) Mika Häkkinen	22
5	(France) Jean Alesi	19

Constructors' Championship standings

Pos	Constructor	Points
1	(United Kingdom) Williams-Renault	89
2	(United Kingdom) Benetton-Ford	87
3	(Italy) Ferrari	58
4	(United Kingdom) McLaren-Peugeot	34
5	(Republic of Ireland) Jordan-Hart	20

Previous race: 1994 Italian Grand Prix	FIA Formula One World Championship; 1994 season	Next race: 1994 European Grand Prix
Previous race: 1993 Portuguese Grand Prix	Portuguese Grand Prix	Next race: 1995 Portuguese Grand Prix
