= Benetton B194 =

Formula One racing car

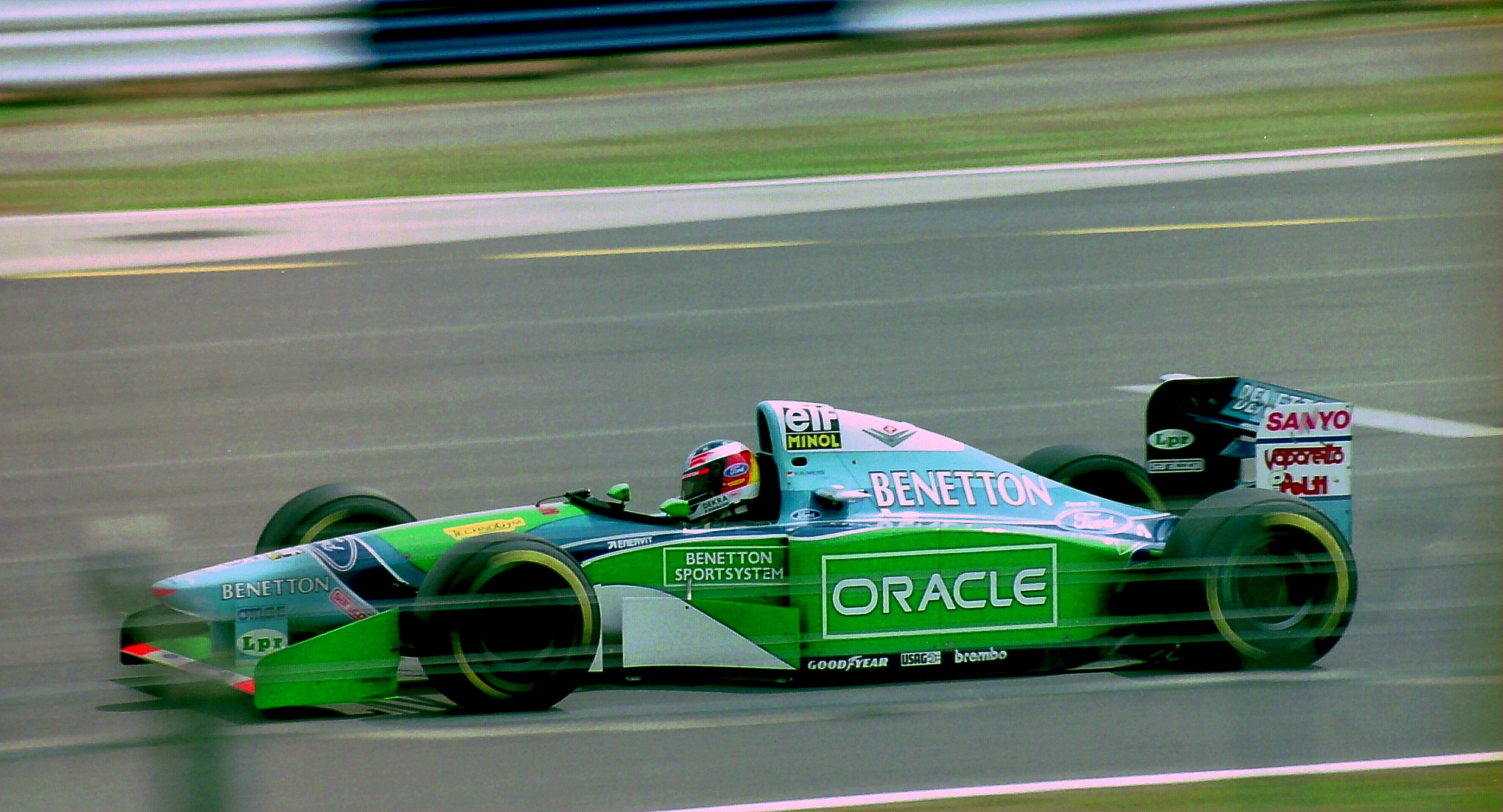
- Michael Schumacher driving the B194 at the 1994 British Grand Prix
- Category: Formula One
- Constructor: Benetton
- Designers: Ross Brawn (Technical Director); Rory Byrne (Chief Designer); Pat Symonds (Head of R&D); Willem Toet (Head of Aerodynamics); Geoff Goddard (Chief Engine Designer) (Ford-Cosworth)
- Predecessor: B193
- Successor: B195

Technical specifications
- Chassis: Carbon fibre monocoque
- Suspension (front): Double wishbones, pushrod
- Suspension (rear): Double wishbones, pushrod
- Axle track: Front: 1,690 mm (67 in); Rear: 1,618 mm (63.7 in)
- Wheelbase: 2,880 mm (113 in)
- Engine: Ford EC Zetec-R, 3,498 cc (213.5 cu in), 75° V8, NA, mid-engine, longitudinally mounted
- Transmission: Benetton transverse 6-speed sequential semi-automatic
- Power: 730–740 hp (544.4–551.8 kW) @ 14,500 rpm
- Weight: 515 kg (1,135 lb)
- Fuel: Elf
- Tyres: Goodyear

Competition history
- Notable entrants: Mild Seven Benetton Ford
- Notable drivers: 5. (Germany) Michael Schumacher; 6. (Netherlands) Jos Verstappen; 6. (Finland) JJ Lehto; 6. (United Kingdom) Johnny Herbert
- Debut: 1994 Brazilian Grand Prix
- First win: 1994 Brazilian Grand Prix
- Last win: 1994 European Grand Prix
- Last event: 1994 Australian Grand Prix
Races	Wins	Podiums	Poles	F/Laps
16	8	12	6	8
- Constructors' Championships: 0
- Drivers' Championships: 1 (1994, Michael Schumacher)

The Benetton B194 is a Formula One racing car designed by Rory Byrne for use by the Benetton team in the 1994 Formula One World Championship.

This was the last Ford-powered Benetton F1 car since the B187 in 1987, and is also the last Ford-powered Formula One car to win the Drivers' Championship overall to date.

== Design ==
The car was closely based on its predecessors, the B192 and B193, and powered by a Ford Zetec-R V8 engine (produced by Cosworth but funded by and badged as a Ford), designed and developed by Geoff Goddard. The electronic driver aids that had such an effect on F1 over the previous seasons were banned, so the car had to be redesigned with the new rules in mind. The B194 was a light and nimble car and was most competitive in the hands of Schumacher on twisty tracks, unlike the early Williams FW16 which proved difficult to drive thanks to Williams's dependence on electronic driving aids in the previous season. Michael Schumacher's B194 remained the most competitive driver/car combination until Williams introduced a B-spec car at the German Grand Prix. The car also gained an anhedral lower rear wing element, similar to the one on the FW16, starting at the Canadian Grand Prix.

=== Launch control controversy ===
Other teams suspected the B194 was not legal, due to the high competitiveness of such a comparatively underpowered car. The FIA launched an investigation and a start sequence (launch control) system was discovered in the cars' onboard computer systems but no traction control. In the end, the governing body could not prove the systems had been used so the complaints were dropped.

== Racing history ==
=== Schumacher ===
The car was very competitive in the hands of Michael Schumacher. Schumacher won six of the first seven races of the season after his initial main rival, Ayrton Senna, was killed at the San Marino Grand Prix. Schumacher himself was subject to controversy, after being disqualified from the British Grand Prix and then the Belgian Grand Prix which allowed Damon Hill to cut into the German's points lead and as they came to the final race in Australia, Hill and Schumacher were separated by one point. A contentious collision between Hill and Schumacher ended the 1994 drivers' title in Schumacher's favour.

Starting with the 1994 Pacific Grand Prix, Schumacher's car was adorned with small red accents, presumably to help spectators and television commentators distinguish his car from that of his teammates. During the preceding race, announcers from both ESPN and the BBC twice mistook the no. 6 Benetton as the no. 5 car. Schumacher commented years later that the B194 was actually quite a handful to drive, being twitchy at the rear end.

=== Teammates ===
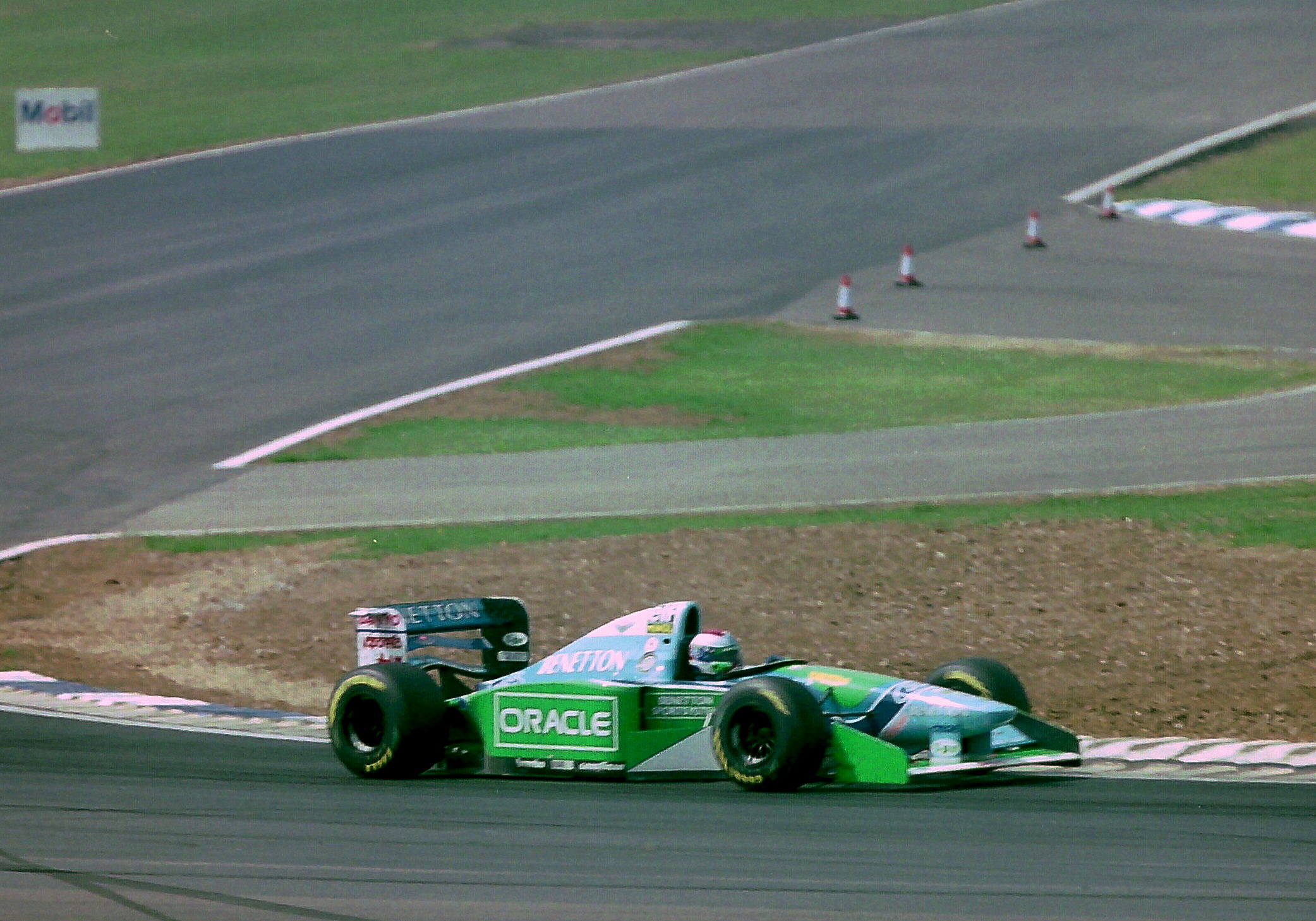
Jos Verstappen driving the B194

Schumacher had three team-mates—JJ Lehto, Jos Verstappen, and Johnny Herbert—during the course of the season. All found the B194 difficult to drive; Verstappen said in 1996 that "I must have a little the same driving style as Johnny because he said basically the same things about that car that I did and seems to have had the same feelings. It was a very difficult car. You could not feel the limit and so you were pushing and pushing and then suddenly it would have oversteer. Normally when you get oversteer you can control it but the Benetton would go very suddenly and so you ended up having a spin. I had big problems with that car."

The B194 was retired at the end of the season with eight wins and second place in the Constructors' Championship. The car was replaced by the B195 for 1995.

=== BOSS GP ===
The B194 was used in the BOSS GP Series with major success, winning the Open Class title in 2000 and 2002.

== Sponsorship and livery ==
The B194 sporting a new light blue livery, reflecting their new main sponsor Mild Seven, replacing Camel. Benetton used the 'Mild Seven' logos, except at the Canadian, British, German and French Grands Prix.

Throughout the season, the team gained several sponsors including Oracle and Minichamps. Beginning at the British Grand Prix, the B194 also had major sponsorship placed on its sidepods including Oracle (British GP), Minichamps (German GP) and Bitburger (Japanese and Australian GPs). Bitburger remained a major sponsor for Benetton into 1995.

== In popular culture ==
The Benetton B194 is featured in the F1 2020 video game as a DLC for the "Deluxe Schumacher Edition".

== Complete Formula One results ==
(key) (results in bold indicate pole position; results in italics indicate fastest lap)

Year	Team	Engine	Tyres	Drivers	1	2	3	4	5	6	7	8	9	10	11	12	13	14	15	16	Points	WCC
1994	Mild Seven Benetton Ford	Ford EC Zetec-R V8	**G**		BRA	PAC	SMR	MON	ESP	CAN	FRA	GBR	GER	HUN	BEL	ITA	POR	EUR	JPN	AUS	**103**	**2nd**
1994	Mild Seven Benetton Ford	Ford EC Zetec-R V8	**G**	Michael Schumacher	1	1	1	**1**	**2**	**1**	1	DSQ	Ret	**1**	DSQ			**1**	**2**	Ret	**103**	**2nd**
1994	Mild Seven Benetton Ford	Ford EC Zetec-R V8	**G**	Jos Verstappen	Ret	Ret					Ret	8	Ret	3	3	Ret	5	Ret			**103**	**2nd**
1994	Mild Seven Benetton Ford	Ford EC Zetec-R V8	**G**	JJ Lehto			Ret	7	Ret	6						9	Ret				**103**	**2nd**
1994	Mild Seven Benetton Ford	Ford EC Zetec-R V8	**G**	Johnny Herbert															Ret	Ret	**103**	**2nd**

Awards
Preceded by Williams FW15C	Autosport; Racing Car Of The Year; 1994	Succeeded by Williams FW17
