= Jean-Marc Gounon =

French racing driver (born 1963)

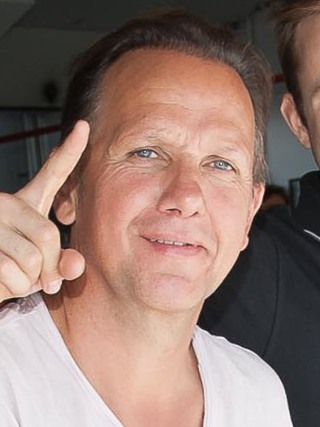
- Gounon in 2015
- Born: Jean-Marc André Gounon; 1 January 1963 (age 63); Aubenas, Ardèche, France
- Relatives: Jules Gounon (son)

Formula One World Championship career
- Nationality: (France) French
- Active years: 1993–1994
- Team(s): Minardi, Simtek
- Entries: 9
- Championships: 0
- Wins: 0
- Podiums: 0
- Career points: 0
- Pole positions: 0
- Fastest laps: 0
- First entry: 1993 Japanese Grand Prix
- Last entry: 1994 Portuguese Grand Prix

Jean-Marc André Gounon (born 1 January 1963) is a French racing driver. He raced in Formula One in 1993 and 1994, participating in a total of 9 Grands Prix and scoring no championship points. He is the father of fellow racing driver Jules Gounon.

== Career ==
After winning the French Formula 3 Championship in 1989, Gounon moved into International Formula 3000 in 1990. He was the only man to win F3000 races in a non-Reynard in 1991 and 1992, in a RALT and Lola respectively. He also became known for his quick starts, and might have had another win at Enna in 1991, but was controversially adjudged to have jumped the start in the era before electronic detection.

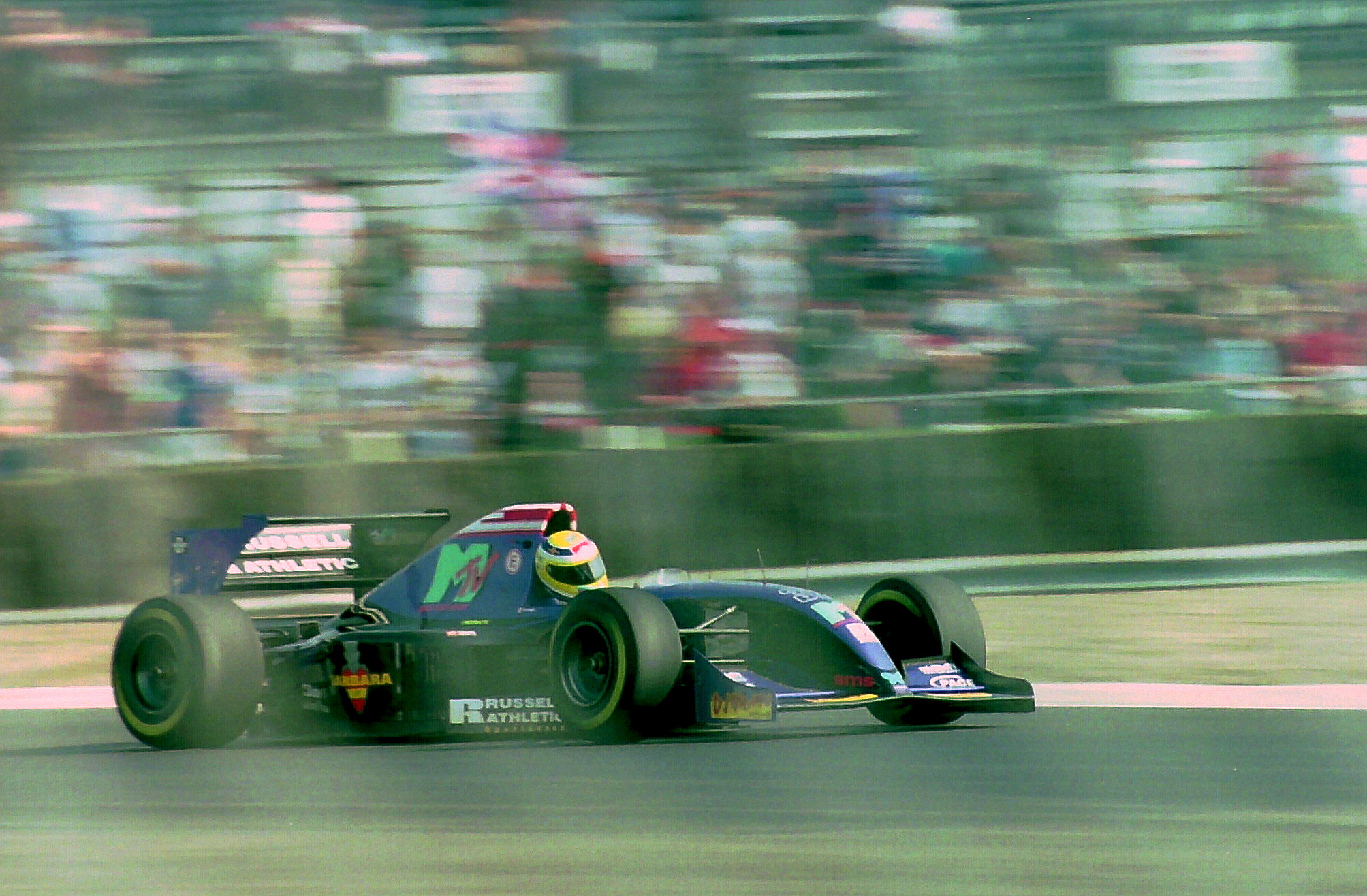
Gounon driving for Simtek at the 1994 British Grand Prix.

In 1993, Gounon was originally signed to drive in F1 for March but the team collapsed at the start of the season. He later bought a two-race deal with Minardi after Christian Fittipaldi was dropped but he finished neither race, being withdrawn at Suzuka and spinning off in the season-closer, Adelaide's 1993 Australian Grand Prix.

The next year, Gounon benefited from Andrea Montermini having broken his leg, and finished ninth for Simtek at his home race, France (Simtek's joint best ever result). He raced in seven grands prix that season and qualified for all of them, being finally replaced after the Portuguese Grand Prix by the better-funded Domenico Schiattarella, ending his F1 career.

Later in his career, Gounon went on to drive sports cars.

== Racing record ==
=== Complete International Formula 3000 results ===
(key) (Races in bold indicate pole position; races in italics indicate fastest lap.)

Year	Entrant	1	2	3	4	5	6	7	8	9	10	11	DC	Points
1990	Madgwick International	DON; Ret	SIL; 13	PAU; DNQ	JER; Ret	MNZ; Ret	PER; DSQ	HOC; 3	BRH; 6	BIR; 4	BUG; 4	NOG; Ret	9th	11
1991	3001 International	VAL; DNQ	PAU; 1	JER; 6	MUG; 10	PER; 6	HOC; 5	BRH; Ret	SPA; 7	BUG; Ret	NOG; Ret		6th	13
1992	DAMS	SIL; 4	PAU; Ret	CAT; Ret	PER; Ret	HOC; Ret	NÜR; 6	SPA; 9	ALB; 16†	NOG; 2	MAG; 1		7th	19

† Driver did not finish, but was classified as he had completed more than 90% of the race distance.

=== Complete Formula One results ===
(key)

Year	Entrant	Chassis	Engine	1	2	3	4	5	6	7	8	9	10	11	12	13	14	15	16	WDC	Points
1993	Minardi Team	Minardi M193	Ford V8	RSA	BRA	EUR	SMR	ESP	MON	CAN	FRA	GBR	GER	HUN	BEL	ITA	POR	JPN; Ret	AUS; Ret	NC	0
1994	MTV Simtek Ford	Simtek S941	Ford V8	BRA	PAC	SMR	MON	ESP	CAN	FRA; 9	GBR; 16	GER; Ret	HUN; Ret	BEL; 11	ITA; Ret	POR; 15	EUR	JPN	AUS	NC	0

=== 24 Hours of Le Mans results ===
Year	Team	Co-Drivers	Car	Class	Laps	Pos.	Class Pos.
1995	(France) Venturi Automobiles	(France) Paul Belmondo (France) Arnaud Trévisiol	Venturi 600 LM	GT1	193	NC	NC
1996	(Italy) Ennea SRL Igol	(France) Éric Bernard (France) Paul Belmondo	Ferrari F40 GTE	GT1	40	DNF	DNF
1997	(United Kingdom) Gulf Team Davidoff (United Kingdom) GTC Racing	(France) Pierre-Henri Raphanel (Sweden) Anders Olofsson	McLaren F1 GTR	GT1	360	**2nd**	**1st**
1998	(Germany) AMG-Mercedes	(Brazil) Ricardo Zonta (France) Christophe Bouchut	Mercedes-Benz CLK-LM	GT1	31	DNF	DNF
1999	(Germany) AMG-Mercedes	(Germany) Marcel Tiemann (Australia) Mark Webber	Mercedes-Benz CLR	LMGTP	0	DNS	DNS
2000	(Germany) Thomas Bscher Promotion (United Kingdom)	(Germany) Thomas Bscher (United Kingdom) Geoff Lees	BMW V12 LM	LMP900	180	DNF	DNF
2003	(France) Courage Compétition	(France) Jonathan Cochet (France) Stéphan Grégoire	Courage C60-Judd	LMP900	360	7th	5th
2004	(France) Courage Compétition	(Switzerland) Alexander Frei (United Kingdom) Sam Hancock	Courage C65-JPX	LMP2	127	DNF	DNF
2005	(France) Audi PlayStation Team Oreca	(France) Franck Montagny (Monaco) Stéphane Ortelli	Audi R8	LMP1	362	4th	4th
2006	(France) Courage Compétition	(Japan) Shinji Nakano (Japan) Haruki Kurosawa	Courage LC70-Mugen	LMP1	35	DNF	DNF
2007	(France) Courage Compétition	(France) Guillaume Moreau (Sweden) Stefan Johansson	Courage LC70-AER	LMP1	175	DNF	DNF
2008	(Spain) Epsilon Euskadi	(Japan) Shinji Nakano (Sweden) Stefan Johansson	Epsilon Euskadi ee1-Judd	LMP1	158	DNF	DNF

== Sources ==
- Profile at www.grandprix.com

Sporting positions
Preceded by Érik Comas	French Formula Three; Champion; 1989	Succeeded by Éric Hélary
