= Benetton B193 =

1993 Formula One racing car by Benetton

Benetton B193 Benetton B193B
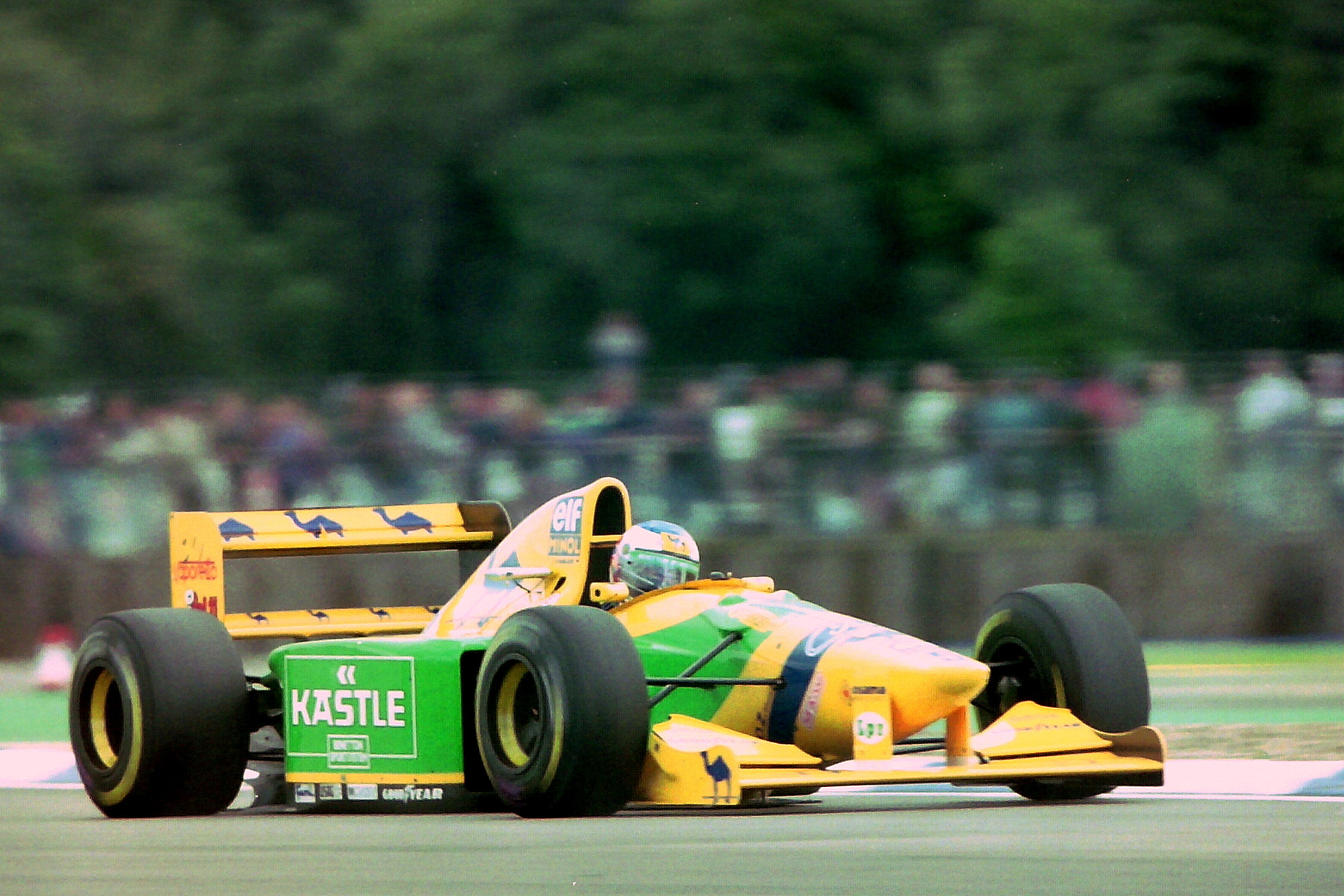
- Michael Schumacher at the 1993 British Grand Prix
- Category: Formula One
- Constructor: Benetton Formula Ltd.
- Designers: Ross Brawn (Technical Director); Rory Byrne (Chief Designer); Pat Symonds (Head of R&D); Richard Marshall (Head of Electronics); Willem Toet (Head of Aerodynamics); Geoff Goddard (Chief Engine Designer) (Ford-Cosworth)
- Predecessor: B192
- Successor: B194

Technical specifications
- Chassis: Carbon fibre monocoque
- Suspension (front): Double wishbones, pushrod
- Suspension (rear): Double wishbones, pushrod
- Axle track: Front: 1,690 mm (67 in); Rear: 1,618 mm (63.7 in)
- Wheelbase: 2,880 mm (113 in)
- Engine: Ford HBA7 / Ford HBA8, 3,498 cc (213.5 cu in), 75° V8, NA, mid-engine, longitudinally-mounted
- Transmission: Benetton transverse 6-speed semi-automatic
- Power: 700–730 hp (522–544 kW; 710–740 PS) @ 13,200 rpm
- Weight: 505 kg (1,113 lb)
- Fuel: Elf
- Tyres: Goodyear

Competition history
- Notable entrants: Camel Benetton Ford
- Notable drivers: 5. (Germany) Michael Schumacher; 6. (Italy) Riccardo Patrese
- Debut: 1993 South African Grand Prix
- First win: 1993 Portuguese Grand Prix
- Last win: 1993 Portuguese Grand Prix
- Last event: 1993 Australian Grand Prix
Races	Wins	Podiums	Poles	F/Laps
16	1	11	0	5
- Constructors' Championships: 0
- Drivers' Championships: 0

The Benetton B193 is a Formula One racing car with which the Benetton team competed in the 1993 Formula One World Championship. Designed by Ross Brawn and Rory Byrne, the car was powered by the then-latest Cosworth HBA engine in an initially-exclusive deal with Ford, and ran on Goodyear tyres. It was driven by German Michael Schumacher and veteran Italian Riccardo Patrese.

== Overview ==
The car was distinguishable from its predecessor due to its track being 15 cm (5.9 in) narrower per the regulations of 1993, and the addition of bargeboards at the European Grand Prix. It also had sidepods with a less pronounced cut-in for the radiator ducts. The nose height was raised from that of the B192, as well as having a longer and flatter rear 'deck' to allow for smoother airflow over the rear suspension than the B192.

The standard rear-wing endplate profile was also changed, featuring a straight leading edge rather than the curved design of the B192. Later in the season, this would further change with the addition of the 'forward wing'; an additional cantilevered wing used on high-downforce tracks, mounted forward and above the main plane, attached via endplate extensions. The leading edge of the front wing now also followed a straight profile, rather than curving forward towards the endplates. The leading edge of the nose also followed a smoother curved profile, whereas the B192 was flatter at its tip.

Due to the powerful engine, Michael Schumacher was able to challenge the McLarens and occasionally challenged the seemingly unbeatable Williams FW15C.

It was overall the second most competitive car on the grid, behind the Williams, with Schumacher regularly scoring podiums and out-qualifying the single-lap ace Ayrton Senna in 8 of the 16 races of the season. Having access to the most potent factory engine in contrast to McLaren having to make do with older-specification units gave Benetton a power advantage, (although Williams used a far superior Renault V10), however, the McLaren had the edge at some races, in particular in wet conditions due in part to their use of traction control. Due to McLaren's early-season results (achieved in part against the B193A run in South Africa and Brazil) McLaren were able successfully lobby Ford to provide engines of equal-spec to Benetton from Silverstone onward, with both running the Series VIII of the HB V8, where previously Benetton's exclusive deal had seen McLaren using the Series VII which Benetton also ran in the B192/B193A.

The car was very advanced in the technological sense and featured active suspension, semi-automatic transmission, and traction control, from the Monaco Grand Prix onwards, although Riccardo Patrese did later say that the car was a step down in quality compared to the much more sophisticated Williams cars he had been driving for the previous five years.

A variant of this car, the B193C was used as a test mule for an innovative four-wheel steering system and was tested by Schumacher and Patrese at Estoril. Four-wheel steering had been introduced on some of Nissan and Toyota's production cars. Patrese both found the system to not add anything to the performance of the car and actually slowed the car through slower corners; however Schumacher preferred the system as estimated a gain 3 tenths of a second per lap. The system was built onto Schumacher's race car for Japan and Australia, but he failed to complete either race (this wasn't the fault of the 4WS system, but rather because of an accident and engine failure, respectively). The system would only have been legal for those 2 races; advanced technologies to aid drivers were banned for the 1994 season.

Benetton eventually finished 3rd in the Constructors' Championship just behind McLaren but with a substantial gap to Williams. The B193B was replaced for the 1994 season by the Benetton B194.

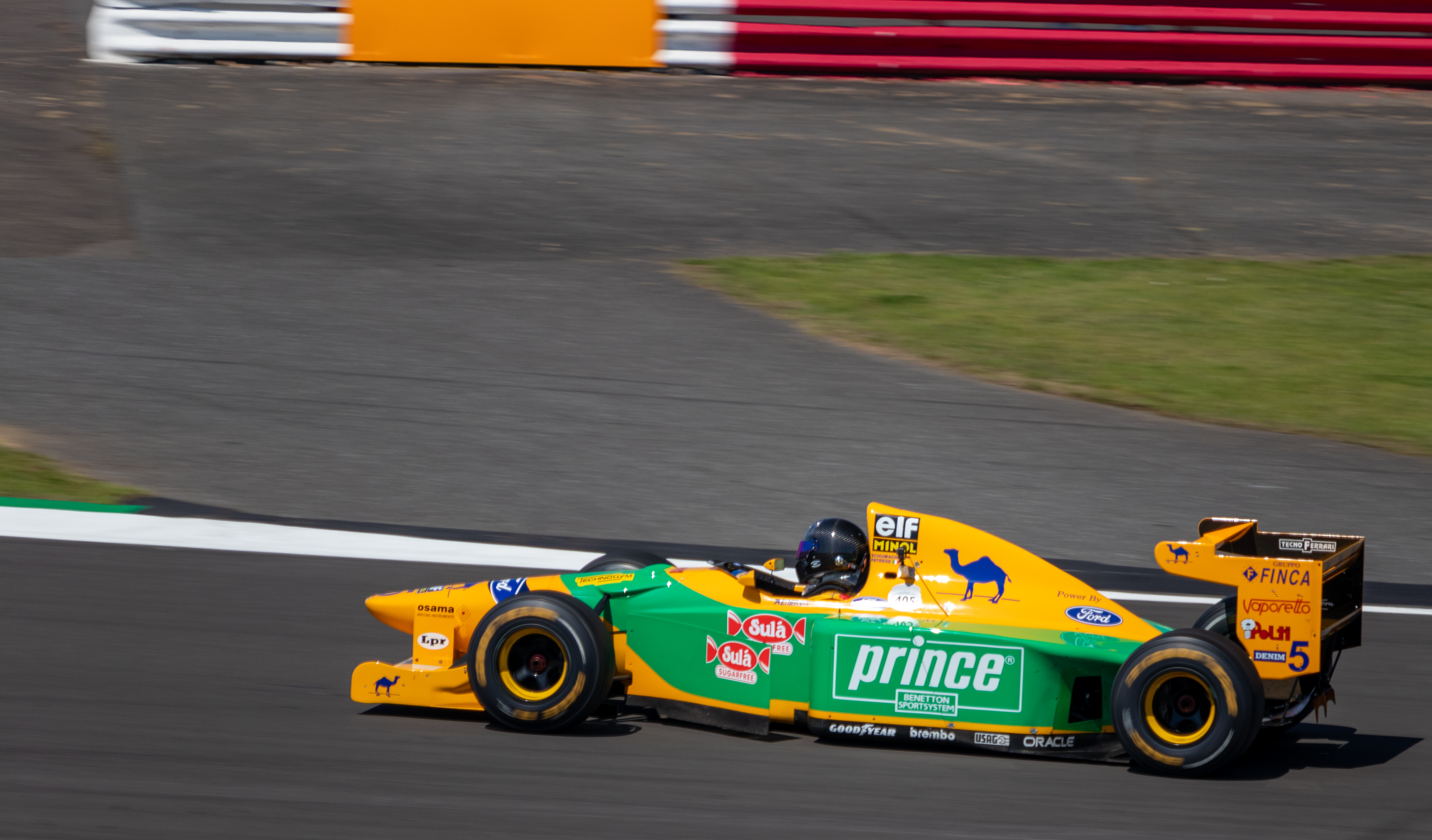
A Benetton B193 at the 2021 British Grand Prix

== Livery ==
This was the last Formula One car to feature cigarette brand Camel as the team's main sponsor, before the long-term association of the Enstone-based team with Mild Seven cigarettes. Benetton used the 'Camel' logos, except at the French, British, German and European Grands Prix.

The cars carried numbers 5 and 6, changing from the 19 and 20 the team had worn since inception. This was because McLaren had lost the Drivers' Championship title in 1992, but rather than swap with new champion Williams' 5/6, it chose to pick up the 7/8 that had been left by the vacated Brabham team. This allowed Benetton to pick up the unassigned 5/6.

== Complete Formula One results ==
(key) (results in italics indicate fastest lap)

Year	Entrant	Chassis	Engine	Tyres	Driver	1	2	3	4	5	6	7	8	9	10	11	12	13	14	15	16	Pts.	WCC
1993	Camel Benetton Ford		Ford HBA7 / HBA8; V8	G		RSA	BRA	EUR	SMR	ESP	MON	CAN	FRA	GBR	GER	HUN	BEL	ITA	POR	JPN	AUS	72	3rd
1993	Camel Benetton Ford	B193A	Ford HBA7 / HBA8; V8	G	Michael Schumacher	Ret	3															72	3rd
1993	Camel Benetton Ford	B193B	Ford HBA7 / HBA8; V8	G	Michael Schumacher			Ret	2	3	Ret	2	3	2	2	Ret	2	Ret	1	Ret	Ret	72	3rd
1993	Camel Benetton Ford	B193A	Ford HBA7 / HBA8; V8	G	Riccardo Patrese	Ret	Ret															72	3rd
1993	Camel Benetton Ford	B193B	Ford HBA7 / HBA8; V8	G	Riccardo Patrese			5	Ret	4	Ret	Ret	10	3	5	2	6	5	16	Ret	8	72	3rd
