= Érik Comas =

French racing driver (born 1963)

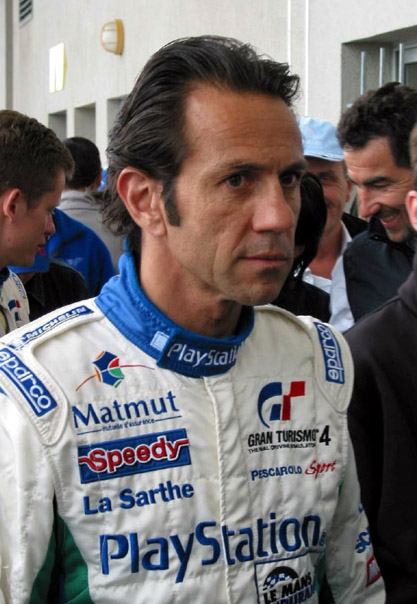
- Comas at the 2005 24 Hours of Le Mans
- Born: Érik Gilbert Comas; 28 September 1963 (age 63); Romans-sur-Isère, Drôme, France

Formula One World Championship career
- Nationality: (France) French
- Active years: 1991–1994
- Team(s): Ligier, Larrousse
- Entries: 63 (59 starts)
- Championships: 0
- Wins: 0
- Podiums: 0
- Career points: 7
- Pole positions: 0
- Fastest laps: 0
- First entry: 1991 United States Grand Prix
- Last entry: 1994 Japanese Grand Prix

Super GT career
- Years active: 1995–2006
- Teams: Cerumo, TOM'S, Nismo, Hasemi, Kondo
- Starts: 80
- Championships: 2 (1998, 1999)
- Wins: 6
- Podiums: 23
- Poles: 3
- Fastest laps: 7
- Best finish: 1st in 1998, 1999 (GT500)

24 Hours of Le Mans career
- Years: 1995, 1997–1999, 2002, 2004–2006
- Teams: Larbre, Nismo, Oreca, Pescarolo
- Best finish: 2nd (2005)
- Class wins: 0

Érik Gilbert Comas (French: [e.ʁik kɔ.mas]; born 28 September 1963) is a French former racing driver, who competed in Formula One from 1991 to 1994. In Japanese motorsport, Comas won the All-Japan GT Championship in 1998 and 1999 with Nismo.

Comas won the French Formula Three Championship in 1988, before winning International Formula 3000 in 1990, after finishing runner-up to Jean Alesi on count-back in 1989. He participated in 63 Formula One Grands Prix between 1991 and 1994, scoring a total of seven championship points. His last point, in the 1994 German Grand Prix, was also the last one for the Larrousse team. After his Formula One career, he won the All-Japan GT Championship for Nismo in the top GT500 class in 1998 and 1999, and finished runner-up at the 24 Hours of Le Mans in 2005 with Pescarolo.

== Career ==
=== Formula One ===
==== 1991 and 1992: Ligier ====
After his F3000 championship victory in 1990, Comas was selected to drive for the Ligier F1 team in 1991. The Ligier JS35 with its Lamborghini engine proved uncompetitive throughout the season. Comas failed to qualify for the race on his first attempt in Brazil, achieved his first finish with 10th at Imola, and achieved his highest finish of the season with eighth in Canada, scoring no points during the season. Although he failed to qualify on two other occasions and suffered a spectacular crash at Hockenheim, he generally compared well with more experienced teammate Thierry Boutsen who also failed to score any points. Early in 1992, Comas's place in the team was briefly threatened by Alain Prost who tested the team's new Renault-powered car with a view to driving for, and possibly buying the team, with Comas revealing years later that he had not been given any testing mileage during the winter. Ultimately Prost chose not to proceed, and Comas retained his drive alongside Boutsen for the season. The 1992 car, the Ligier JS37 seemed promising, a brand new design featuring the race-winning Renault V10 engine, but it proved to be only inconsistently competitive. Comas scored his first career F1 point with sixth place in Canada, scored fifth at Ligier's home race in France and a further point in Germany during a mid-season revival of the team's fortunes. With four points, he was generally faster than and outscored Boutsen, and finished eleventh in the Driver's Championship. At the 1992 Belgian Grand Prix Comas was involved in a severe accident at the Blanchimont corner during Saturday qualifying. Left unconscious in his car beached in the middle of the track with the engine still running at its rev limiter, Comas was rescued by Ayrton Senna who stopped his own car and ran to help Comas, by shutting off the car's screaming engine (which was still pumping fuel and could have blown at any moment starting a fire), and holding the Frenchman's head in a stable position until medical assistance arrived. Comas credited Senna with saving his life.

==== 1993 and 1994: Larrousse ====
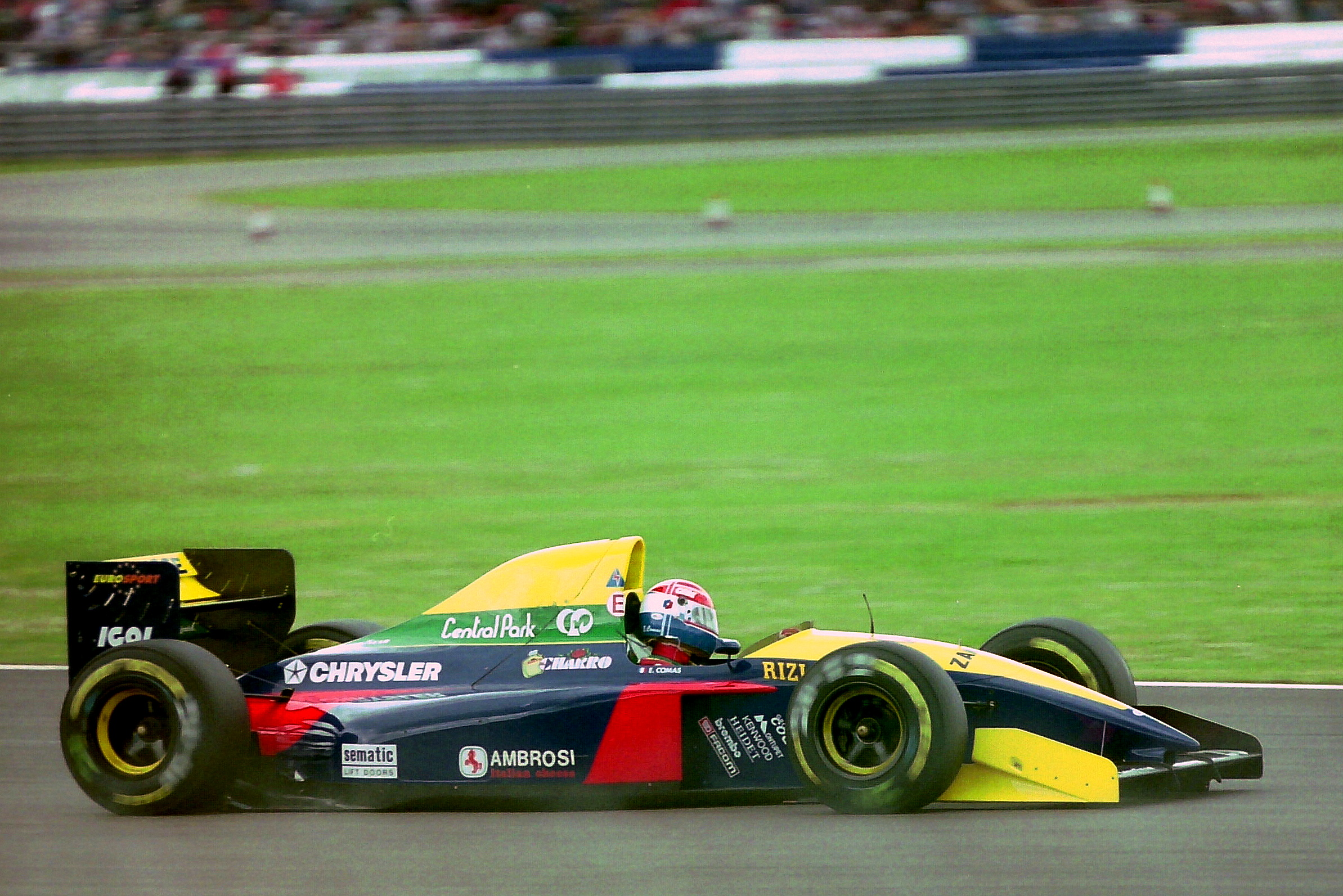
Érik Comas driving the LH93 during practice for the 1993 British Grand Prix

Comas was not retained by Ligier for 1993; he instead signed with the small Larrousse team, running the LH93 chassis powered by Lamborghini V12s. The car was uncompetitive, Comas retiring from half the sixteen races of the season, and scoring only one point for sixth at Monza.

Retained by Larrousse in 1994, Comas drove the LH94 car, now powered by more reliable Ford HB engines. Comas scored a point for sixth at the Pacific Grand Prix, and benefited from the retirement of many other cars to take another point at Hockenheim. This was both his and Larrousse's final F1 points finish. For the last race of the season in Australia, Comas relinquished his seat to make way for Jean-Denis Delétraz who brought more funding to the team.

At the 1994 San Marino Grand Prix, due to a radio miscommunication, Comas was released onto the track during the red flag after Senna had crashed, arriving at the Tamburello corner where he met the workers and vehicles, including an aid helicopter which had landed at the scene. Having had to brake hard to avoid hitting either marshals, their vehicles, or the helicopter, Comas declined to participate in the restart of the race, after witnessing medical staff treating the mortally-injured Senna.

=== After Formula One ===
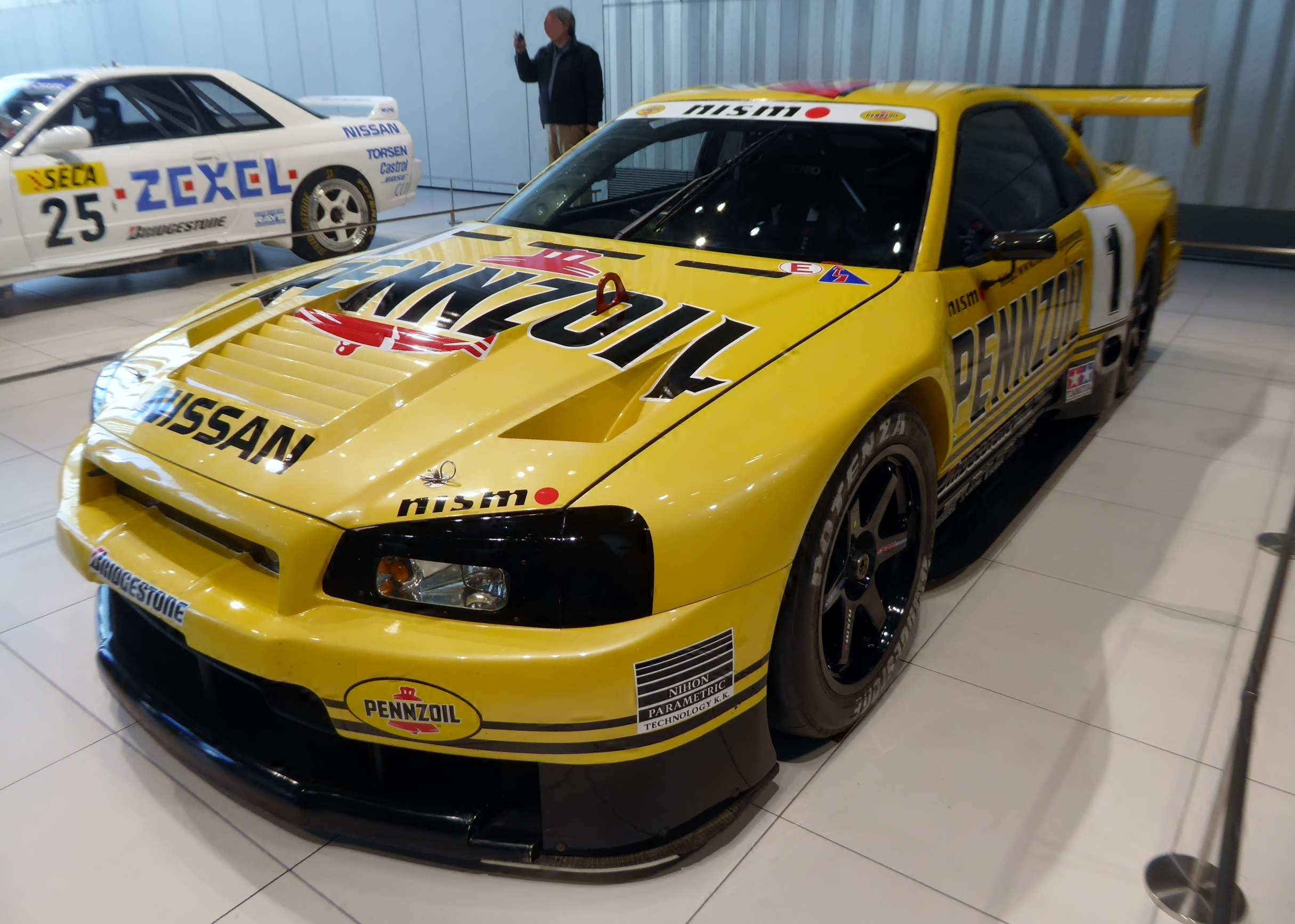
The Nissan Skyline GT-R in which Comas won his second JGTC title in 1999

After ending his Formula One career at the end of the 1994 season, Comas went to Japan to continue his racing career in the All-Japan Grand Touring Car Championship (JGTC), Japan's premiere racing series. He won the GT500 title in 1998 and 1999, and was runner-up in the standings in 2000, all three years driving for Nissan in a factory Nismo-prepared Skyline GT-R. He left the Nismo team in 2002 to join the factory Toyota team the following year. By the end of the 2003 season, he was the most successful driver in the history of the series, with the most career championship points ever scored by a single driver. This was eventually surpassed by another Nismo driver, Satoshi Motoyama.

Comas spent the 2004/2005 seasons with Masahiro Hasemi's privateer Hasemi Sport team, running non-factory Nissan 350Zs in GT500, including inheriting the team's only win (co-driving with Toshihiro Kaneishi) thus far, on the evening of 18 December 2004 at the "All-Star 200" exhibition race on California Speedway's combined oval/road course after the unofficial winners were penalized sixty seconds on their finishing time for a pit window infraction. The race was a non-points scoring event and as such does not count towards the drivers' or teams' official win record.

In the 2006 Super GT championship season (formerly JGTC), Comas raced for former JGTC driver and 24 Hours of Le Mans team owner Masahiko Kondo's new privateer Nissan 350Z racing team. He also branched out into rallying, competing in various events around the world. Along with this, he created Comas Racing Management (CRM), a firm that focuses on the management and development of young up and coming drivers, primarily from his home country of France.

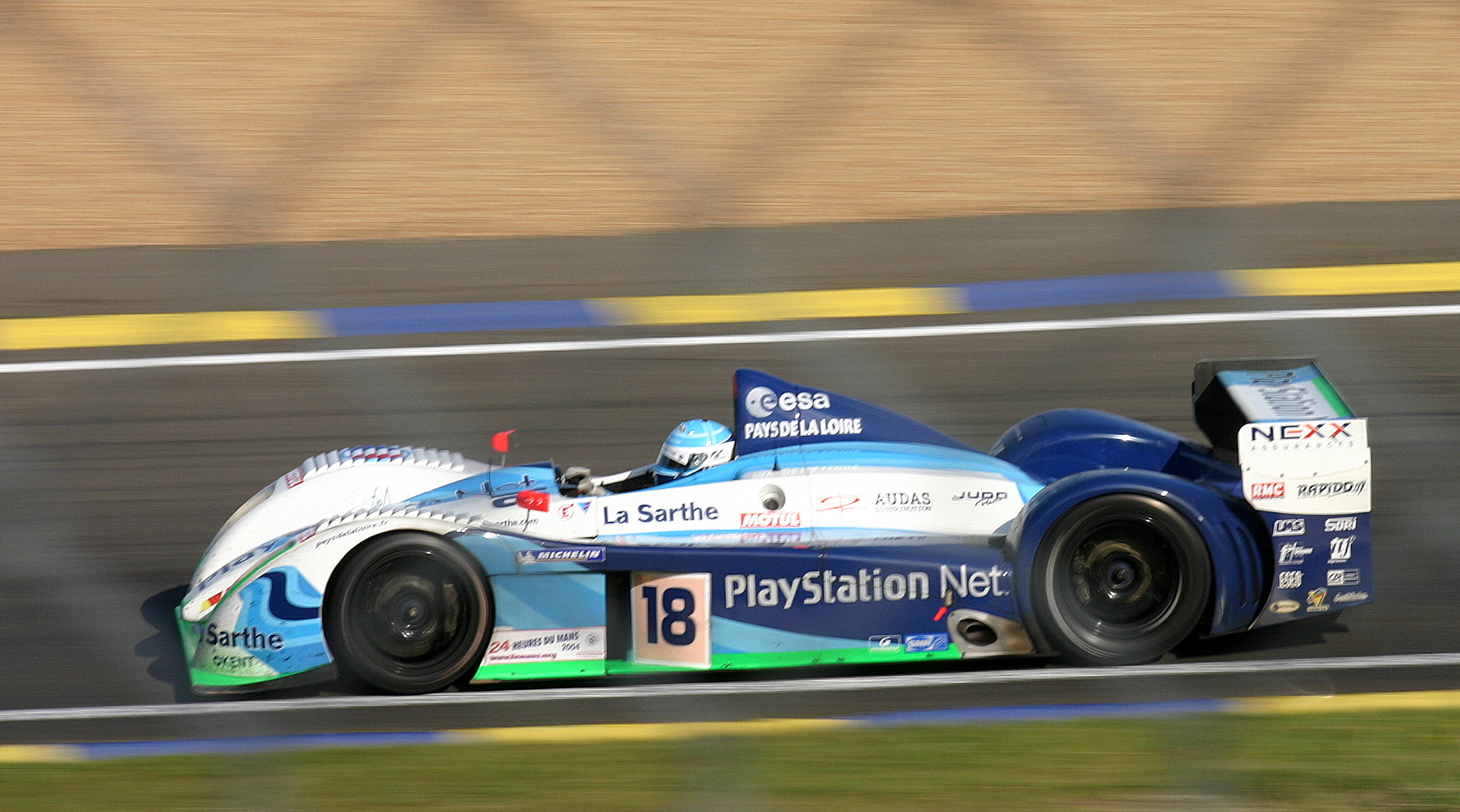
Comas competing at the 2004 24 Hours of Le Mans

At the fifth race of the 2006 season at Sportsland SUGO, Comas was replaced by Seiji Ara due to ill health. After returning for the Pokka 1000 km, on 5 September 2006, Comas announced that because of his health, he would not compete in the final three races of the season.

In 2010 and 2011, Comas won the electric vehicle category of the Rallye Monte Carlo des Véhicules à Énergie Alternative (the opening event of the FIA Alternative Energies Cup) with a Tesla Roadster. In 2014, he won the Carrera Panamericana in a Studebaker. Between 2012 and 2017, he rallied a Lancia Stratos.

Comas has now retired from all forms of racing. He spends his time running Comas Historic Racing, which provides for paying customers to enter historic rallies driving cars from his fleet of blue Alpine automobiles. In 2019, Comas obtained one of the Nissan R390 GT1, a car he competed in the 1998 Le Mans 24 Hours with, and had it restored as well as being made street-legal.

== Racing record ==
=== Career summary ===
Season	Series	Team	Races	Wins	Poles	F/Laps	Podiums	Points	Position
1985	Championnat de France Formule Renault Turbo	Ecurie Elf	12	1	0	1	6	98	4th
1986	Championnat de France Formule Renault Turbo	Ecurie Elf	13	8	9	9	12	163	**1st**
1987	French Supertouring Championship	Sonica	12	3	?	?	?	?	**1st**
1987	French Formula Three Championship	Ecurie Elf	12	0	0	0	3	70	6th
1988	French Formula Three Championship	Ecurie Elf	12	4	5	4	10	136	**1st**
1988	Macau Grand Prix	Team KTR	1	0	0	0	0	N/A	10th
1989	International Formula 3000	DAMS	9	2	3	3	5	39	**2nd**
1990	International Formula 3000	DAMS	11	4	3	1	6	51	**1st**
1991	Formula One	Ligier Gitanes	13	0	0	0	0	0	NC
1992	Formula One	Ligier Gitanes Blondes	15	0	0	0	0	4	11th
1993	Formula One	Larrousse F1	16	0	0	0	0	1	20th
1994	Formula One	Tourtel Larrousse F1	15	0	0	0	0	2	23rd
1995	All Japan Grand Touring Car Championship	Team Cerumo	6	0	1	1	0	8	17th
1995	24 Hours of Le Mans	Société Larbre Compétition	1	0	0	0	0	N/A	DNF
1996	Japanese Touring Car Championship	Team Cerumo	14	1	0	0	2	52	8th
1996	All Japan Grand Touring Car Championship	TOM'S	6	1	0	0	2	55	**3rd**
1997	All Japan Grand Touring Car Championship	NISMO	5	1	0	0	3	50	6th
1997	24 Hours of Le Mans	NISMO	1	0	0	0	0	N/A	12th
1998	All Japan Grand Touring Car Championship	NISMO	6	2	0	0	2	67	**1st**
1998	24 Hours of Le Mans	NISMO	1	0	0	0	0	N/A	6th
1999	All Japan Grand Touring Car Championship	NISMO	7	1	0	0	4	77	**1st**
1999	American Le Mans Series	Team Rafanelli SRL	3	0	0	0	1	48	24th
1999	24 Hours of Le Mans	NISMO	1	0	0	0	0	N/A	DNF
2000	All Japan Grand Touring Car Championship	NISMO	7	1	0	2	3	68	**2nd**
2001	All Japan Grand Touring Car Championship	NISMO	7	0	0	1	3	53	4th
2002	All Japan Grand Touring Car Championship	NISMO	8	0	0	8	8	19	19th
2002	24 Hours of Le Mans	PlayStation Team Oreca	1	0	0	0	0	N/A	5th
2003	All Japan Grand Touring Car Championship	TOM'S	8	0	1	1	2	61	5th
2004	All Japan Grand Touring Car Championship	Hasemi Motorsport	7	0	1	1	2	50	4th
2004	24 Hours of Le Mans	Pescarolo Sport	1	0	0	0	0	N/A	4th
2005	Super GT	Hasemi Motorsport	8	0	0	0	2	42	8th
2005	24 Hours of Le Mans	Pescarolo Sport	1	0	0	0	1	N/A	**2nd**
2005	European Le Mans Series	Pescarolo Sport	1	0	0	0	1	8	14th
2006	Super GT	Kondo Racing	5	0	0	0	0	18	18th
2006	24 Hours of Le Mans	Pescarolo Sport	1	0	0	0	0	N/A	5th
2014	Carrera Panamericana		1	1	N/A	N/A	1	N/A	**1st**

=== Complete Macau Grand Prix results ===
Year	Team	Chassis/Engine	Qualifying	Race1	Race2	Overall ranking	Ref
1988	(France) KTR Racing	Ralt・VW	27th	16	8	10th	

=== Complete International Formula 3000 results ===
(key) (Races in bold indicate pole position; races in italics indicate fastest lap.)

Year	Entrant	1	2	3	4	5	6	7	8	9	10	11	DC	Points
1989	DAMS	SIL; 5	VAL; 4	PAU; DNQ	JER; 2	PER; Ret	**BRH**; 3	BIR; Ret	**SPA**; 2	BUG; 1	DIJ; 1		**2nd**	**39**
1990	DAMS	DON; 1	SIL; 2	**PAU**; Ret	**JER**; 1	MNZ; 1	PER; Ret	HOC; 4	BRH; Ret	BIR; Ret	**BUG**; 1	NOG; 2	**1st**	**51**

=== Complete Formula One results ===
(key)

Year	Entrant	Chassis	Engine	1	2	3	4	5	6	7	8	9	10	11	12	13	14	15	16	WDC	Points
1991	Ligier Gitanes	Ligier JS35	Lamborghini V12	USA; DNQ	BRA; Ret	SMR; 10	MON; 10	CAN; 8	MEX; DNQ	FRA; 11	GBR; DNQ	GER; Ret	HUN; 10	BEL; Ret	ITA; 11	POR; 11	ESP; Ret	JPN; Ret	AUS; 18	NC	0
1992	Ligier Gitanes Blondes	Ligier JS37	Renault V10	RSA; 7	MEX; 9	BRA; Ret	ESP; Ret	SMR; 9	MON; 10	CAN; 6	FRA; 5	GBR; 8	GER; 6	HUN; Ret	BEL; DNQ	ITA; Ret	POR; Ret	JPN; Ret	AUS; Ret	11th	4
1993	Larrousse F1	Larrousse LH93	Lamborghini V12	RSA; Ret	BRA; 10	EUR; 9	SMR; Ret	ESP; 9	MON; Ret	CAN; 8	FRA; 16	GBR; Ret	GER; Ret	HUN; Ret	BEL; Ret	ITA; 6	POR; 11	JPN; Ret	AUS; 12	20th	1
1994	Tourtel Larrousse F1	Larrousse LH94	Ford V8	BRA; 9	PAC; 6	SMR; Ret	MON; 10	ESP; Ret	CAN; Ret	FRA; Ret	GBR; Ret	GER; 6	HUN; 8	BEL; Ret	ITA; 8	POR; Ret	EUR; Ret	JPN; 9	AUS	23rd	2

=== Complete JGTC/Super GT results ===
(key) (Races in bold indicate pole position) (Races in italics indicate fastest lap)

Year	Team	Car	Class	1	2	3	4	5	6	7	8	9	DC	Points
1995	Team Cerumo	Toyota Supra	GT1	SUZ; 5	**FUJ**; 14	SEN; 15	FUJ; Ret	SUG; 11	MIN; DSQ				19th	8
1996	TOM'S	Toyota Supra	GT500	SUZ; 16	FUJ; 4	SEN; 1	FUJ; Ret	SUG; 4	MIN; 2				**3rd**	**55**
1997	NISMO	Nissan Skyline GT-R	GT500	SUZ; 1	FUJ	SEN; 2	FUJ; 10	MIN; 9	SUG; 3				6th	50
1998	NISMO	Nissan Skyline GT-R	GT500	SUZ; 1	FUJ; C	SEN; 1	FUJ; 10	MOT; 4	MIN; 4	SUG; 6			**1st**	**67**
1999	NISMO	Nissan Skyline GT-R	GT500	SUZ; 2	FUJ; 5	SUG; 6	MIN; 1	FUJ; 3	TAI; 7	MOT; 3			**1st**	**77**
2000	NISMO	Nissan Skyline GT-R	GT500	MOT; 1	FUJ; 6	SUG; Ret	FUJ; 4	TAI; 3	MIN; 3	SUZ; 5			**2nd**	**68**
2001	NISMO	Nissan Skyline GT-R	GT500	TAI; 13	FUJ; 4	SUG; 10	FUJ; 2	MOT; Ret	SUZ; 3	MIN; 2			4th	53
2002	NISMO	Nissan Skyline GT-R	GT500	TAI; 12	FUJ; 6	SUG; 4	SEP; 16	FUJ; 14	MOT; 17	MIN; Ret	SUZ; 8		19th	19
2003	TOM'S	Toyota Supra	GT500	TAI; 6	FUJ; 10	SUG; 2	FUJ; 7	FUJ; 5	**MOT**; 2	AUT; 8	SUZ; 8		5th	61
2004	Hasemi Motorsport	Nissan Z	GT500	TAI; 6	SUG; 6	SEP; 4	**TOK**; 3	MOT; 7	AUT; Ret	SUZ; 3			4th	50
2005	Hasemi Motorsport	Nissan Z	GT500	OKA; 3	FUJ; 9	SEP; Ret	SUG; 15	MOT; 13	FUJ; 4	AUT; 3	SUZ; 4		8th	42
2006	Kondo Racing	Nissan Z	GT500	SUZ; 10	OKA; 10	FUJ; 10	SEP; 8	SUG	SUZ; 5	MOT	AUT	FUJ	18th	18

=== 24 Hours of Le Mans results ===
Year	Team	Co-Drivers	Car	Class	Laps	Pos.	Class Pos.
1995	(France) Société Larbre Compétition	(France) Jean-Pierre Jarier (Spain) Jesús Pareja	Porsche 911 GT2 Evo	GT1	64	DNF	DNF
1997	(Japan) NISMO	(Japan) Kazuyoshi Hoshino (Japan) Masahiko Kageyama	Nissan R390 GT1	GT1	294	12th	5th
1998	(Japan) NISMO	(Netherlands) Jan Lammers (Italy) Andrea Montermini	Nissan R390 GT1	GT1	342	6th	6th
1999	(Japan) NISMO	(Germany) Michael Krumm (Japan) Satoshi Motoyama	Nissan R391	LMP	110	DNF	DNF
2002	(France) PlayStation Team Oreca	(Monaco) Olivier Beretta (Portugal) Pedro Lamy	Dallara SP1-Judd	LMP900	359	5th	4th
2004	(France) Pescarolo Sport	(France) Soheil Ayari (France) Benoît Tréluyer	Pescarolo C60-Judd	LMP1	361	4th	4th
2005	(France) Pescarolo Sport	(France) Emmanuel Collard (France) Jean-Christophe Boullion	Pescarolo C60 Hybrid-Judd	LMP1	368	**2nd**	**2nd**
2006	(France) Pescarolo Sport	(France) Emmanuel Collard (France) Nicolas Minassian	Pescarolo C60 Hybrid-Judd	LMP1	352	5th	4th

=== Complete JTCC results ===
(key) (Races in bold indicate pole position) (Races in italics indicate fastest lap)

Year	Team	Car	1	2	3	4	5	6	7	8	9	10	11	12	13	14	DC	Points
1996	Team Cerumo	Toyota Corona EXiV	FUJ; 1; 18	FUJ; 2; 6	SUG; 1; 6	SUG; 2; 10	SUZ; 1 Ret	SUZ; 2 Ret	MIN; 1; 13	MIN; 2; 8	SEN; 1; 5	SEN; 2; 6	TOK; 1 Ret	TOK; 2; 8	FUJ; 1; 1	FUJ; 2; 3	8th	52

=== Complete World Rally Championship results ===
Year	Entrant	Car	1	2	3	4	5	6	7	8	9	10	11	12	13	14	WDC	Points
2000	Érik Comas	Mitsubishi Lancer Evo VI	MON	SWE	KEN	POR	ESP	ARG	GRE	NZL	FIN	CYP	FRA	ITA	AUS; Ret	GBR	NC	0

=== Complete Le Mans Endurance Series results ===
(key) (Races in bold indicate pole position; races in italics indicate fastest lap)

Year	Entrant	Class	Car	Engine	1	2	3	4	5	Pos.	Points
2005	Pescarolo Sport	LMP1	Pescarolo C60 Hybrid	Judd GV5 5.0L V10	**SPA**; 2	MNZ	SIL	NÜR	IST	14th	8

Sporting positions
Preceded by Éric Bernard	Championnat de France Formule Renault Turbo; Champion; 1986	Succeeded by Claude Degremont
Preceded by Xavier Lapeyre	French Touring Car Championship; Champion; 1987	Succeeded by Jean Ragnotti
Preceded by Jean Alesi	French Formula Three Championship; Champion; 1988	Succeeded by Jean-Marc Gounon
Preceded by Jean Alesi	International Formula 3000; Champion; 1990	Succeeded by Christian Fittipaldi
Preceded by Pedro de la Rosa; Michael Krumm	All Japan Grand Touring Car Championship; GT500 Champion; 1998-1999; With: Masami Kageyama (1998)	Succeeded by Ryo Michigami
