= 1994 French Grand Prix =

- Race 7 of 16 in the 1994 Formula One World Championship

Race details
- Date: 3 July 1994
- Official name: 80e Grand Prix de France
- Location: Circuit de Nevers Magny-Cours, Magny-Cours, France
- Course: Permanent racing facility
- Course length: 4.250 km (2.641 miles)
- Distance: 72 laps, 306.000 km (191.140 miles)
- Weather: Sunny

Pole position
Driver	(United Kingdom) Damon Hill	Williams-Renault
- Time: 1:16.282

Fastest lap
Driver	(United Kingdom) Damon Hill	Williams-Renault
- Time: 1:19.678 on lap 4

Podium
First	(Germany) Michael Schumacher	Benetton-Ford
Second	(United Kingdom) Damon Hill	Williams-Renault
Third	(Austria) Gerhard Berger	Ferrari

The 1994 French Grand Prix was a Formula One motor race held on 3 July 1994 at the Circuit de Nevers Magny-Cours near Magny-Cours in France. It was the seventh race of the 1994 Formula One World Championship.

The 72-lap race was won by Michael Schumacher, driving a Benetton-Ford. It was Schumacher's sixth victory in seven races. Damon Hill finished second in a Williams-Renault, having started from pole position and led the race, while Gerhard Berger finished third in a Ferrari.

Schumacher now led the Drivers' Championship by 37 points from Hill.

== Report ==
=== Background ===
Nigel Mansell made his return to Formula One, driving for Williams-Renault in place of David Coulthard. He had left F1 at the end of 1992 to race in IndyCar. JJ Lehto was rested by Benetton-Ford and was replaced by the test driver Jos Verstappen who had previously deputised for Lehto earlier in the season. Jean-Marc Gounon would drive the second Simtek-Ford following Andrea Montermini's accident at the Spanish Grand Prix.

=== Race ===
Olivier Panis and Gianni Morbidelli collided on lap 29. This was the only retirement of the season for Panis. Michael Schumacher won the race ahead of Damon Hill and Gerhard Berger. Heinz-Harald Frentzen finished fourth, his best Formula One finish up to this point. Pierluigi Martini was fifth and Andrea de Cesaris finished sixth. These would prove to be the last world championship points that Martini and de Cesaris scored in their careers, with de Cesaris failing to finish another race in his Formula One career. The ninth place of Jean-Marc Gounon, four laps behind, would be the best result for the Simtek Team, a feat they would only reach once again.

== Classification ==
=== Qualifying ===
Pos	No	Driver	Constructor	Q1 Time	Q2 Time	Gap
1	0	(United Kingdom) Damon Hill	Williams-Renault	1:17.539	1:16.282	
2	2	(United Kingdom) Nigel Mansell	Williams-Renault	1:18.340	1:16.359	+0.077
3	5	(Germany) Michael Schumacher	Benetton-Ford	1:17.085	1:16.707	+0.425
4	27	(France) Jean Alesi	Ferrari	1:17.855	1:16.954	+0.672
5	28	(Austria) Gerhard Berger	Ferrari	1:17.441	1:16.959	+0.677
6	15	(United Kingdom) Eddie Irvine	Jordan-Hart	1:19.463	1:17.441	+1.159
7	14	(Brazil) Rubens Barrichello	Jordan-Hart	1:18.326	1:17.482	+1.200
8	6	(Netherlands) Jos Verstappen	Benetton-Ford	1:18.669	1:17.645	+1.363
9	7	(Finland) Mika Häkkinen	McLaren-Peugeot	1:19.041	1:17.768	+1.486
10	30	(Germany) Heinz-Harald Frentzen	Sauber-Mercedes	1:19.318	1:17.830	+1.548
11	29	(Italy) Andrea de Cesaris	Sauber-Mercedes	1:20.145	1:17.866	+1.584
12	8	(United Kingdom) Martin Brundle	McLaren-Peugeot	1:18.112	1:18.031	+1.749
13	26	(France) Olivier Panis	Ligier-Renault	1:19.697	1:18.044	+1.762
14	3	(Japan) Ukyo Katayama	Tyrrell-Yamaha	1:19.969	1:18.192	+1.910
15	25	(France) Éric Bernard	Ligier-Renault	1:19.292	1:18.236	+1.954
16	23	(Italy) Pierluigi Martini	Minardi-Ford	1:20.084	1:18.248	+1.966
17	4	(United Kingdom) Mark Blundell	Tyrrell-Yamaha	1:20.001	1:18.381	+2.099
18	9	(Brazil) Christian Fittipaldi	Footwork-Ford	1:20.801	1:18.568	+2.286
19	12	(United Kingdom) Johnny Herbert	Lotus-Mugen-Honda	1:20.108	1:18.715	+2.433
20	20	(France) Érik Comas	Larrousse-Ford	1:20.576	1:18.811	+2.529
21	24	(Italy) Michele Alboreto	Minardi-Ford	1:20.097	1:18.890	+2.608
22	10	(Italy) Gianni Morbidelli	Footwork-Ford	1:20.707	1:18.936	+2.654
23	11	(Italy) Alessandro Zanardi	Lotus-Mugen-Honda	1:20.122	1:19.066	+2.784
24	31	(Australia) David Brabham	Simtek-Ford	1:22.527	1:19.771	+3.489
25	19	(Monaco) Olivier Beretta	Larrousse-Ford	1:21.964	1:19.863	+3.581
26	32	(France) Jean-Marc Gounon	Simtek-Ford	1:23.264	1:21.829	+5.547
DNQ	34	(France) Bertrand Gachot	Pacific-Ilmor	1:24.048	1:21.952	+5.670
DNQ	33	(France) Paul Belmondo	Pacific-Ilmor	1:24.637	1:23.004	+6.722

=== Race ===
Pos	No	Driver	Constructor	Laps	Time/Retired	Grid	Points
1	5	(Germany) Michael Schumacher	Benetton-Ford	72	1:38:35.704	3	10
2	0	(United Kingdom) Damon Hill	Williams-Renault	72	+ 12.642	1	6
3	28	(Austria) Gerhard Berger	Ferrari	72	+ 52.765	5	4
4	30	(Germany) Heinz-Harald Frentzen	Sauber-Mercedes	71	+ 1 Lap	10	3
5	23	(Italy) Pierluigi Martini	Minardi-Ford	70	+ 2 Laps	16	2
6	29	(Italy) Andrea de Cesaris	Sauber-Mercedes	70	+ 2 Laps	11	1
7	12	(United Kingdom) Johnny Herbert	Lotus-Mugen-Honda	70	+ 2 Laps	19	
8	9	(Brazil) Christian Fittipaldi	Footwork-Ford	70	+ 2 Laps	18	
9	32	(France) Jean-Marc Gounon	Simtek-Ford	68	+ 4 Laps	26	
10	4	(United Kingdom) Mark Blundell	Tyrrell-Yamaha	67	+ 5 Laps	17	
11	20	(France) Érik Comas	Larrousse-Ford	66	Engine	20	
Ret	3	(Japan) Ukyo Katayama	Tyrrell-Yamaha	53	Spun Off	14	
Ret	7	(Finland) Mika Häkkinen	McLaren-Peugeot	48	Engine	9	
Ret	2	(United Kingdom) Nigel Mansell	Williams-Renault	45	Gearbox	2	
Ret	27	(France) Jean Alesi	Ferrari	41	Collision	4	
Ret	14	(Brazil) Rubens Barrichello	Jordan-Hart	41	Collision	7	
Ret	25	(France) Éric Bernard	Ligier-Renault	40	Gearbox	15	
Ret	19	(Monaco) Olivier Beretta	Larrousse-Ford	36	Engine	25	
Ret	8	(United Kingdom) Martin Brundle	McLaren-Peugeot	29	Engine	12	
Ret	10	(Italy) Gianni Morbidelli	Footwork-Ford	28	Collision	22	
Ret	26	(France) Olivier Panis	Ligier-Renault	28	Collision	13	
Ret	31	(Australia) David Brabham	Simtek-Ford	28	Transmission	24	
Ret	6	(Netherlands) Jos Verstappen	Benetton-Ford	25	Spun Off	8	
Ret	15	(United Kingdom) Eddie Irvine	Jordan-Hart	24	Gearbox	6	
Ret	24	(Italy) Michele Alboreto	Minardi-Ford	21	Engine	21	
Ret	11	(Italy) Alessandro Zanardi	Lotus-Mugen-Honda	20	Engine	23	

== Championship standings after the race ==
Drivers' Championship standings

Pos	Driver	Points
1	(Germany) Michael Schumacher	66
2	(United Kingdom) Damon Hill	29
3	(Austria) Gerhard Berger	17
4	(France) Jean Alesi	13
5	(Brazil) Rubens Barrichello	7

Constructors' Championship standings

Pos	Constructor	Points
1	(United Kingdom) Benetton-Ford	67
2	(Italy) Ferrari	36
3	(United Kingdom) Williams-Renault	31
4	(Republic of Ireland) Jordan-Hart	11
5	(United Kingdom) McLaren-Peugeot	10

Previous race: 1994 Canadian Grand Prix	FIA Formula One World Championship; 1994 season	Next race: 1994 British Grand Prix
Previous race: 1993 French Grand Prix	French Grand Prix	Next race: 1995 French Grand Prix
