= 1993 British Grand Prix =

- Race 9 of 16 in the 1993 Formula One World Championship
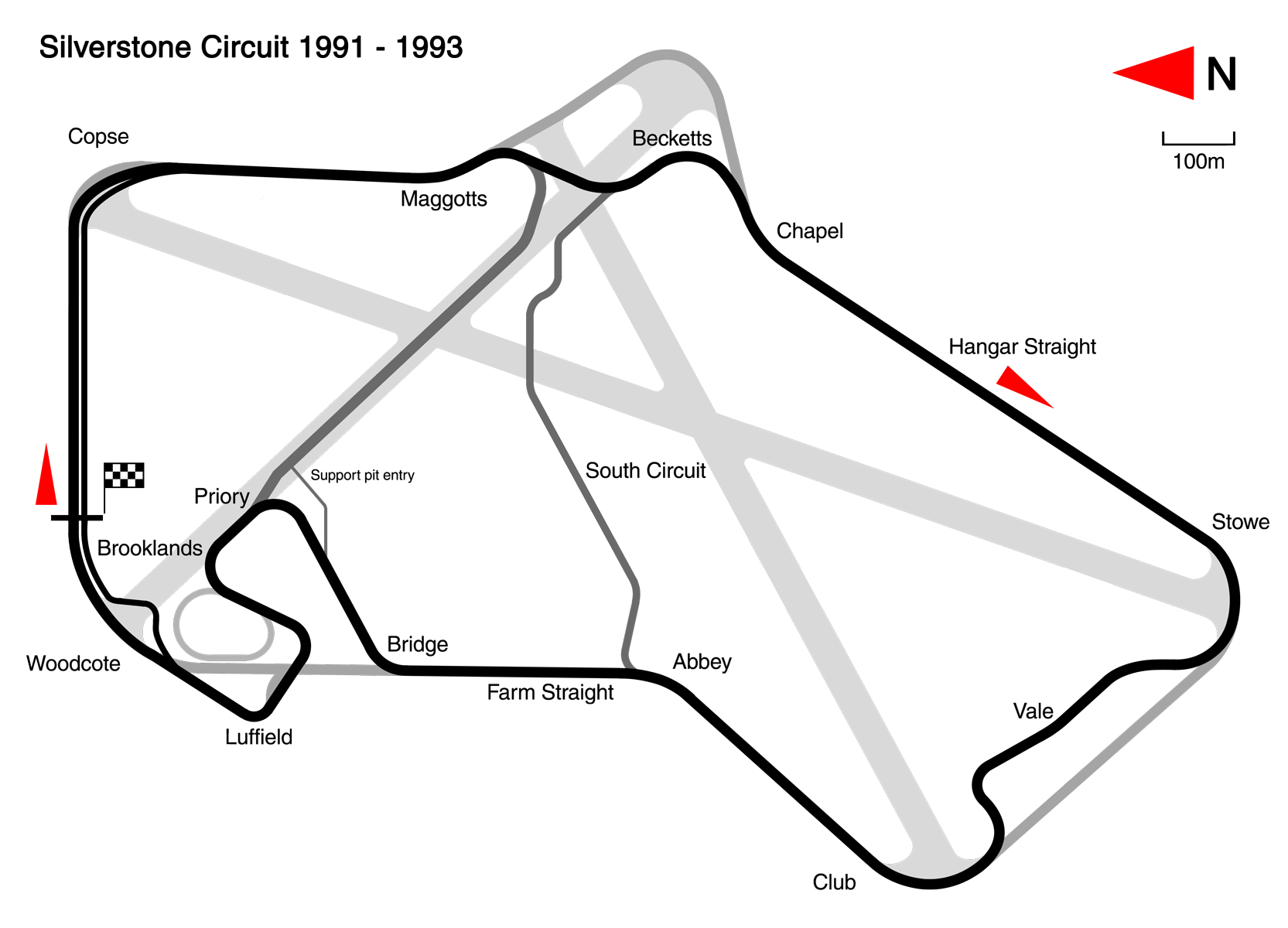
- Silverstone in 1993

Race details
- Date: 11 July 1993
- Location: Silverstone Circuit; Silverstone, Northamptonshire, Great Britain
- Course: Permanent racing facility
- Course length: 5.226 km (3.260 miles)
- Distance: 59 laps, 308.334 km (192.348 miles)
- Weather: Dry

Pole position
Driver	(France) Alain Prost	Williams-Renault
- Time: 1:19.006

Fastest lap
Driver	(United Kingdom) Damon Hill	Williams-Renault
- Time: 1:22.515 on lap 41

Podium
First	(France) Alain Prost	Williams-Renault
Second	(Germany) Michael Schumacher	Benetton-Ford
Third	(Italy) Riccardo Patrese	Benetton-Ford

The 1993 British Grand Prix was a Formula One motor race held at Silverstone on 11 July 1993. It was the ninth race of the 1993 Formula One World Championship.

The 59-lap race was won from pole position by Alain Prost, driving a Williams-Renault. It was Prost's sixth victory of the season and the 50th of his Formula One career, making him the first driver in Formula One history to achieve this milestone. Michael Schumacher finished second in a Benetton-Ford, with teammate Riccardo Patrese third.

This was the second race of 1993 to be held in Britain, after the European Grand Prix at Donington Park three months earlier. The next time Britain would host two races in a single season would be in 2020, when Silverstone hosted both the British Grand Prix and the 70th Anniversary Grand Prix.

== Report ==
With Nigel Mansell now racing Indycars in America, British racing fans had taken Damon Hill to their hearts. Williams took 1–2 in qualifying with Prost on pole ahead of Hill, Schumacher, Ayrton Senna, Patrese and Martin Brundle.

At the start, Hill took the lead from Prost, who was also passed by Senna. Michael Andretti in the other McLaren spun off at Copse on the first lap, while Hill pulled away at the front, and Senna held up both Prost and Schumacher. Prost finally passed Senna on lap 7 but Hill was already five seconds up the road. On lap 13, Schumacher passed Senna for third and pulled away as the order settled down.

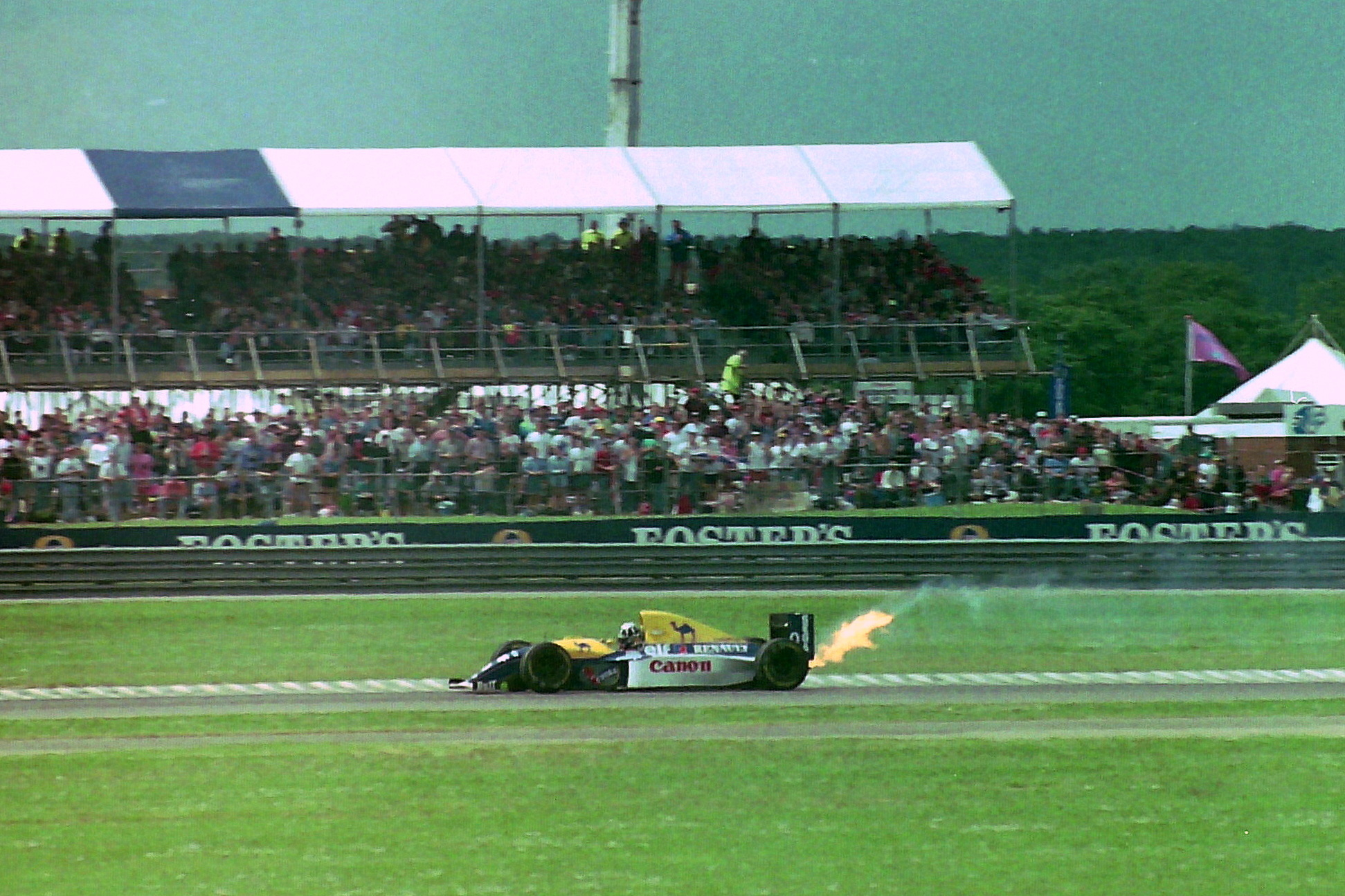
Damon Hill was leading when his engine blew on lap 42.

Gradually Prost closed up on Hill, narrowing the gap to three seconds after the mid-race pit stops. On lap 33 Luca Badoer retired with electrical problems and few laps later the Safety Car was brought out to clear his Lola, reducing the gap between Hill and Prost to nothing. The Safety Car came in on lap 40, before Hill's engine blew two laps later. Brundle's gearbox failed on lap 54 when he was fourth. Finally, on the last lap, Senna's car ran out of fuel. Prost took his 50th Grand Prix win ahead of Schumacher, Patrese, Johnny Herbert, Senna (who was classified fifth) and Derek Warwick.

Complimenting the Lotus team on Herbert's fourth-place finish, Murray Walker closed his broadcast with the words "Lotus are back!". As it turned out, the team only scored points once more, before closing its doors at the end of the following year.

== Classification ==
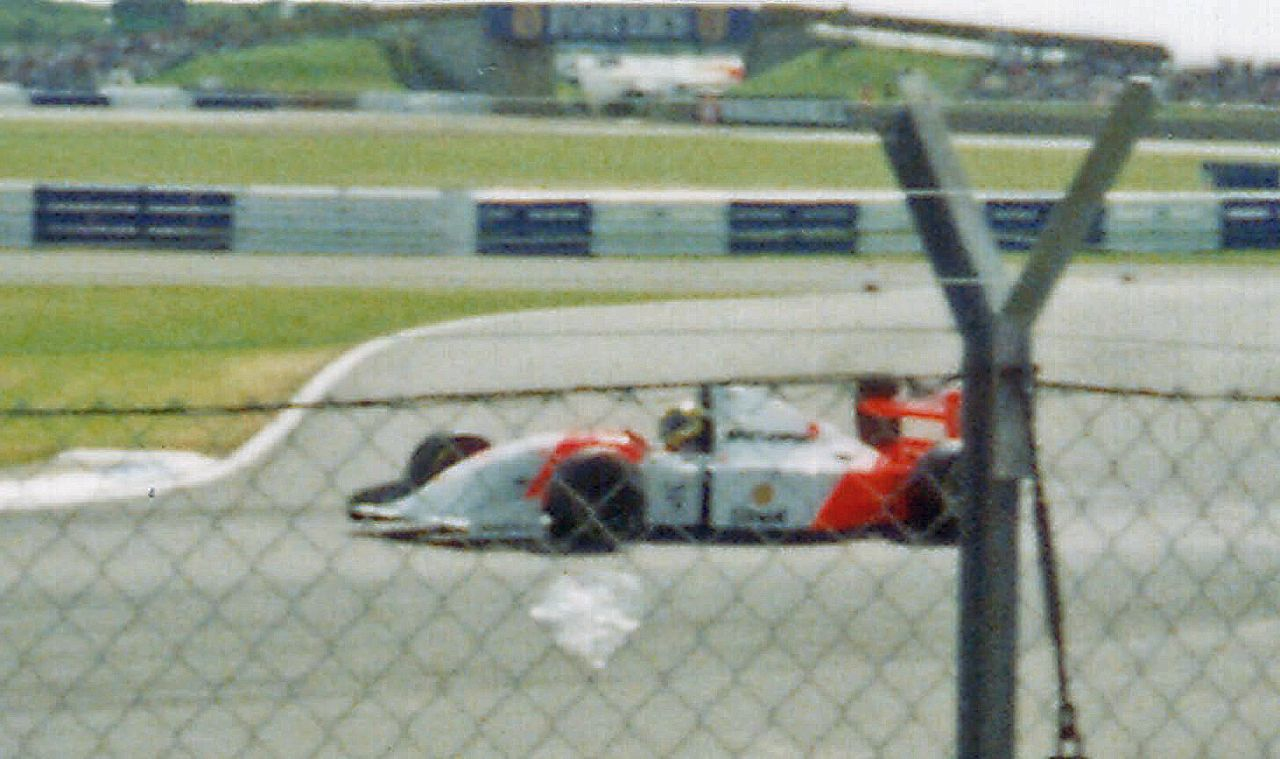
Ayrton Senna was classified fifth after running out of fuel on the last lap.

=== Qualifying ===
Pos	No	Driver	Constructor	Q1	Q2	Gap
1	2	(France) Alain Prost	Williams-Renault	1:34.483	1:19.006	
2	0	(United Kingdom) Damon Hill	Williams-Renault	1:36.297	1:19.134	+0.128
3	5	(Germany) Michael Schumacher	Benetton-Ford	1:37.264	1:20.401	+1.395
4	8	(Brazil) Ayrton Senna	McLaren-Ford	1:37.050	1:21.986	+2.980
5	6	(Italy) Riccardo Patrese	Benetton-Ford	1:38.371	1:22.364	+3.358
6	25	(United Kingdom) Martin Brundle	Ligier-Renault	1:38.384	1:22.421	+3.415
7	12	(United Kingdom) Johnny Herbert	Lotus-Ford	1:41.037	1:22.487	+3.481
8	9	(United Kingdom) Derek Warwick	Footwork-Mugen-Honda	1:39.433	1:22.834	+3.828
9	26	(United Kingdom) Mark Blundell	Ligier-Renault	9:32.793	1:22.885	+3.879
10	10	(Japan) Aguri Suzuki	Footwork-Mugen-Honda	1:40.537	1:23.077	+4.071
11	7	(United States) Michael Andretti	McLaren-Ford	1:38.283	1:23.114	+4.108
12	27	(France) Jean Alesi	Ferrari	1:37.899	1:23.203	+4.197
13	28	(Austria) Gerhard Berger	Ferrari	1:37.976	1:23.257	+4.251
14	11	(Italy) Alessandro Zanardi	Lotus-Ford	1:41.908	1:23.533	+4.527
15	14	(Brazil) Rubens Barrichello	Jordan-Hart	1:40.869	1:23.635	+4.629
16	30	(Finland) JJ Lehto	Sauber	1:39.821	1:24.071	+5.065
17	20	(France) Érik Comas	Larrousse-Lamborghini	1:41.926	1:24.139	+5.133
18	29	(Austria) Karl Wendlinger	Sauber	1:41.940	1:24.525	+5.519
19	23	(Brazil) Christian Fittipaldi	Minardi-Ford	1:41.726	1:24.664	+5.658
20	24	(Italy) Pierluigi Martini	Minardi-Ford	1:40.851	1:24.718	+5.712
21	4	(Italy) Andrea de Cesaris	Tyrrell-Yamaha	1:40.624	1:25.254	+6.248
22	3	(Japan) Ukyo Katayama	Tyrrell-Yamaha	1:43.173	1:25.343	+6.337
23	15	(Belgium) Thierry Boutsen	Jordan-Hart	1:42.957	1:25.363	+6.357
24	19	(France) Philippe Alliot	Larrousse-Lamborghini	1:41.985	1:25.397	+6.391
25	22	(Italy) Luca Badoer	Lola-Ferrari	1:41.838	1:26.239	+7.233
DNQ	21	(Italy) Michele Alboreto	Lola-Ferrari	1:42.844	1:26.520	+7.514

=== Race ===
Pos	No	Driver	Constructor	Laps	Time/Retired	Grid	Points
1	2	(France) Alain Prost	Williams-Renault	59	1:25:38.189	1	10
2	5	(Germany) Michael Schumacher	Benetton-Ford	59	+ 7.660	3	6
3	6	(Italy) Riccardo Patrese	Benetton-Ford	59	+ 1:17.482	5	4
4	12	(United Kingdom) Johnny Herbert	Lotus-Ford	59	+ 1:18.407	7	3
5	8	(Brazil) Ayrton Senna	McLaren-Ford	58	Out of fuel	4	2
6	9	(United Kingdom) Derek Warwick	Footwork-Mugen-Honda	58	+ 1 Lap	8	1
7	26	(United Kingdom) Mark Blundell	Ligier-Renault	58	+ 1 Lap	9	
8	30	(Finland) JJ Lehto	Sauber	58	+ 1 Lap	16	
9	27	(France) Jean Alesi	Ferrari	58	+ 1 Lap	12	
10	14	(Brazil) Rubens Barrichello	Jordan-Hart	58	+ 1 Lap	15	
11	19	(France) Philippe Alliot	Larrousse-Lamborghini	57	+ 2 Laps	24	
12	23	(Brazil) Christian Fittipaldi	Minardi-Ford	56	Gearbox	19	
13	3	(Japan) Ukyo Katayama	Tyrrell-Yamaha	55	+ 4 Laps	22	
14	25	(United Kingdom) Martin Brundle	Ligier-Renault	53	Gearbox	6	
NC	4	(Italy) Andrea de Cesaris	Tyrrell-Yamaha	43	+ 16 Laps	21	
Ret	0	(United Kingdom) Damon Hill	Williams-Renault	41	Engine	2	
Ret	11	(Italy) Alessandro Zanardi	Lotus-Ford	41	Suspension	14	
Ret	15	(Belgium) Thierry Boutsen	Jordan-Hart	41	Wheel bearing	23	
Ret	22	(Italy) Luca Badoer	Lola-Ferrari	32	Electrical	25	
Ret	24	(Italy) Pierluigi Martini	Minardi-Ford	31	Physical	20	
Ret	29	(Austria) Karl Wendlinger	Sauber	24	Spun off	18	
Ret	28	(Austria) Gerhard Berger	Ferrari	10	Suspension	13	
Ret	10	(Japan) Aguri Suzuki	Footwork-Mugen-Honda	8	Spun off	10	
Ret	7	(United States) Michael Andretti	McLaren-Ford	0	Spun off	11	
Ret	20	(France) Érik Comas	Larrousse-Lamborghini	0	Halfshaft	17	

== Championship standings after the race ==
Drivers' Championship standings

	Pos	Driver	Points
	1	(France) Alain Prost	67
	2	(Brazil) Ayrton Senna	47
1	3	(Germany) Michael Schumacher	30
1	4	(United Kingdom) Damon Hill	28
	5	(United Kingdom) Martin Brundle	9

Constructors' Championship standings

	Pos	Constructor	Points
	1	(United Kingdom) Williams-Renault	95
	2	(United Kingdom) McLaren-Ford	50
	3	(United Kingdom) Benetton-Ford	39
	4	(France) Ligier-Renault	15
1	5	(United Kingdom) Lotus-Ford	10

- Note: Only the top five positions are included for both sets of standings.

Previous race: 1993 French Grand Prix	FIA Formula One World Championship; 1993 season	Next race: 1993 German Grand Prix
Previous race: 1992 British Grand Prix	British Grand Prix	Next race: 1994 British Grand Prix
