= 1994 Canadian Grand Prix =

- Race 6 of 16 in the 1994 Formula One World Championship

Race details
- Date: 12 June 1994
- Official name: XXXII Grand Prix Molson du Canada
- Location: Circuit Gilles Villeneuve; Montreal, Quebec, Canada
- Course: Temporary street circuit
- Course length: 4.450 km (2.765 miles)
- Distance: 69 laps, 307.050 km (190.792 miles)
- Weather: Temperatures approaching 26.3 °C (79.3 °F); Wind speeds up to 21 km/h (13 mph)

Pole position
Driver	(Germany) Michael Schumacher	Benetton-Ford
- Time: 1:26.178

Fastest lap
Driver	(Germany) Michael Schumacher	Benetton-Ford
- Time: 1:28.927 on lap 31 (lap record)

Podium
First	(Germany) Michael Schumacher	Benetton-Ford
Second	(United Kingdom) Damon Hill	Williams-Renault
Third	(France) Jean Alesi	Ferrari

The 1994 Canadian Grand Prix was a Formula One motor race held on 12 June 1994 at the Circuit Gilles Villeneuve in Montreal, Quebec, Canada. It was the sixth race of the 1994 Formula One World Championship and the 32nd Canadian Grand Prix.

The 69-lap race was won from pole position by Michael Schumacher, driving a Benetton-Ford, with Damon Hill second in a Williams-Renault and Jean Alesi third in a Ferrari. The win, Schumacher's fifth of the season, put him 33 points clear of Hill in the Drivers' Championship.

== Report ==
=== Background ===
A temporary chicane was inserted between the hairpin and the Casino corner on the back straight, so as to decrease top speed and increase safety in the wake of Ayrton Senna's fatal crash at Imola. Teams had also been ordered to cut holes in the airboxes on the back of the cars, so as to decrease the 'ram air' effect and thus decrease engine output. As the FIA did not standardize where the holes had to be cut, each team interpreted the rule in different ways. Teams were also running on 'pump fuel' as of this race, in a bid to further lower engine output and trap speeds.

Simtek entered only one car for Canada, following the injuries to Andrea Montermini at the previous race in Spain. Andrea de Cesaris replaced the injured Karl Wendlinger at Sauber, and would thus make his 200th Grand Prix start at Montreal.

=== Race ===
Michael Schumacher took his fifth victory from six races in his Benetton, finishing nearly 40 seconds ahead of Damon Hill's Williams. Ferrari driver Jean Alesi finished third, just ahead of teammate Gerhard Berger, the last driver on the lead lap. Hill's teammate David Coulthard was fifth, scoring his first points in Formula One, while Christian Fittipaldi crossed the line sixth but was disqualified when his Footwork was found to be underweight. Schumacher's teammate JJ Lehto was therefore promoted to sixth, scoring his last career point in Formula One.

During the race, Érik Comas became the first Formula One driver to be penalised for speeding in the pit lane; he received a ten-second stop-go penalty.

=== Post-race ===
David's done a fantastic job all weekend. He is very promising. I enjoyed the race - the only small drawback is that we didn't win. We'll have to work harder and push harder to beat Benetton.

— Damon Hill on David Coulthard's performance, transcript of recording from Grand Prix Racing.

The car performed fantastic. I had all the gears this time and I could do what I wanted. I think it would be good for Formula One if Nigel (Mansell) returned. It would bring more competition and I would like that.

— Michael Schumacher on the performance of the Benetton B194 and on a possible Mansell return, transcript of recording from Grand Prix Racing.

== Classification ==
=== Qualifying ===
Pos	No	Driver	Constructor	Q1 Time	Q2 Time	Gap
1	5	(Germany) Michael Schumacher	Benetton-Ford	1:26.820	1:26.178	
2	27	(France) Jean Alesi	Ferrari	1:26.277	1:26.319	+0.099
3	28	(Austria) Gerhard Berger	Ferrari	1:27.652	1:27.059	+0.881
4	0	(United Kingdom) Damon Hill	Williams-Renault	1:28.011	1:27.094	+0.916
5	2	(United Kingdom) David Coulthard	Williams-Renault	1:28.636	1:27.211	+1.033
6	14	(Brazil) Rubens Barrichello	Jordan-Hart	1:28.612	1:27.554	+1.376
7	7	(Finland) Mika Häkkinen	McLaren-Peugeot	1:27.616	1:27.851	+1.438
8	15	(United Kingdom) Eddie Irvine	Jordan-Hart	1:28.843	1:27.780	+1.602
9	3	(Japan) Ukyo Katayama	Tyrrell-Yamaha	1:27.827	1:27.953	+1.649
10	30	(Germany) Heinz-Harald Frentzen	Sauber-Mercedes	1:28.048	1:27.977	+1.799
11	10	(Italy) Gianni Morbidelli	Footwork-Ford	1:28.730	1:27.989	+1.811
12	8	(United Kingdom) Martin Brundle	McLaren-Peugeot	1:28.451	1:28.197	+2.019
13	4	(United Kingdom) Mark Blundell	Tyrrell-Yamaha	1:29.108	1:28.579	+2.401
14	29	(Italy) Andrea de Cesaris	Sauber-Mercedes	1:29.793	1:28.694	+2.516
15	23	(Italy) Pierluigi Martini	Minardi-Ford	1:29.691	1:28.847	+2.669
16	9	(Brazil) Christian Fittipaldi	Footwork-Ford	1:29.493	1:28.882	+2.704
17	12	(United Kingdom) Johnny Herbert	Lotus-Mugen-Honda	1:30.063	1:28.889	+2.711
18	24	(Italy) Michele Alboreto	Minardi-Ford	1:29.597	1:28.903	+2.725
19	26	(France) Olivier Panis	Ligier-Renault	1:29.530	1:28.950	+2.772
20	6	(Finland) JJ Lehto	Benetton-Ford	1:29.580	1:28.993	+2.815
21	20	(France) Érik Comas	Larrousse-Ford	1:29.653	1:29.039	+2.861
22	19	(Monaco) Olivier Beretta	Larrousse-Ford	1:31.167	1:29.403	+3.225
23	11	(Italy) Alessandro Zanardi	Lotus-Mugen-Honda	1:31.698	1:30.160	+3.982
24	25	(France) Éric Bernard	Ligier-Renault	1:30.806	1:30.493	+4.315
25	31	(Australia) David Brabham	Simtek-Ford	1:32.376	1:31.632	+5.454
26	34	(France) Bertrand Gachot	Pacific-Ilmor	1:32.838	1:32.877	+6.660
DNQ	33	(France) Paul Belmondo	Pacific-Ilmor	1:33.291	1:33.006	+6.828

=== Race ===
Pos	No	Driver	Constructor	Laps	Time/Retired	Grid	Points
1	5	(Germany) Michael Schumacher	Benetton-Ford	69	1:44:31.887	1	10
2	0	(United Kingdom) Damon Hill	Williams-Renault	69	+ 39.660	4	6
3	27	(France) Jean Alesi	Ferrari	69	+ 1:13.338	2	4
4	28	(Austria) Gerhard Berger	Ferrari	69	+ 1:15.609	3	3
5	2	(United Kingdom) David Coulthard	Williams-Renault	68	+ 1 lap	5	2
6	6	(Finland) JJ Lehto	Benetton-Ford	68	+ 1 lap	20	1
7	14	(Brazil) Rubens Barrichello	Jordan-Hart	68	+ 1 lap	6	
8	12	(United Kingdom) Johnny Herbert	Lotus-Mugen-Honda	68	+ 1 lap	17	
9	23	(Italy) Pierluigi Martini	Minardi-Ford	68	+ 1 lap	15	
10	4	(United Kingdom) Mark Blundell	Tyrrell-Yamaha	67	Spun off	13	
11	24	(Italy) Michele Alboreto	Minardi-Ford	67	+ 2 laps	18	
12	26	(France) Olivier Panis	Ligier-Renault	67	+ 2 laps	19	
13	25	(France) Éric Bernard	Ligier-Renault	66	+ 3 laps	24	
14	31	(Australia) David Brabham	Simtek-Ford	65	+ 4 laps	25	
15	11	(Italy) Alessandro Zanardi	Lotus-Mugen-Honda	62	+ 7 laps	23	
Ret	7	(Finland) Mika Häkkinen	McLaren-Peugeot	61	Engine	7	
Ret	19	(Monaco) Olivier Beretta	Larrousse-Ford	57	Engine	22	
Ret	10	(Italy) Gianni Morbidelli	Footwork-Ford	50	Transmission	11	
Ret	34	(France) Bertrand Gachot	Pacific-Ilmor	47	Oil pressure	26	
Ret	20	(France) Érik Comas	Larrousse-Ford	45	Clutch	21	
Ret	3	(Japan) Ukyo Katayama	Tyrrell-Yamaha	44	Accident	9	
Ret	15	(United Kingdom) Eddie Irvine	Jordan-Hart	40	Spun off	8	
Ret	29	(Italy) Andrea de Cesaris	Sauber-Mercedes	24	Oil pressure	14	
Ret	30	(Germany) Heinz-Harald Frentzen	Sauber-Mercedes	5	Spun off	10	
Ret	8	(United Kingdom) Martin Brundle	McLaren-Peugeot	3	Electrical	12	
DSQ	9	(Brazil) Christian Fittipaldi	Footwork-Ford	68	Car underweight	16	

== Championship standings after the race ==
Drivers' Championship standings

Pos	Driver	Points
1	(Germany) Michael Schumacher	56
2	(United Kingdom) Damon Hill	23
3	(Austria) Gerhard Berger	13
4	(France) Jean Alesi	13
5	(Brazil) Rubens Barrichello	7

Constructors' Championship standings

Pos	Constructor	Points
1	(United Kingdom) Benetton-Ford	57
2	(Italy) Ferrari	32
3	(United Kingdom) Williams-Renault	25
4	(Republic of Ireland) Jordan-Hart	11
5	(United Kingdom) McLaren-Peugeot	10

Previous race: 1994 Spanish Grand Prix	FIA Formula One World Championship; 1994 season	Next race: 1994 French Grand Prix
Previous race: 1993 Canadian Grand Prix	Canadian Grand Prix	Next race: 1995 Canadian Grand Prix
