= 1994 German Grand Prix =

- Race 9 of 16 in the 1994 Formula One World Championship

Race details
- Date: 31 July 1994
- Official name: LVI Grosser Mobil 1 Preis von Deutschland
- Location: Hockenheimring; Hockenheim, Baden-Württemberg, Germany
- Course: Permanent racing facility
- Course length: 6.823 km (4.264 miles)
- Distance: 45 laps, 307.035 km (191.896 miles)
- Weather: Sunny

Pole position
Driver	(Austria) Gerhard Berger	Ferrari
- Time: 1:43.582

Fastest lap
Driver	(United Kingdom) David Coulthard	Williams-Renault
- Time: 1:46.211 on lap 11

Podium
First	(Austria) Gerhard Berger	Ferrari
Second	(France) Olivier Panis	Ligier-Renault
Third	(France) Éric Bernard	Ligier-Renault

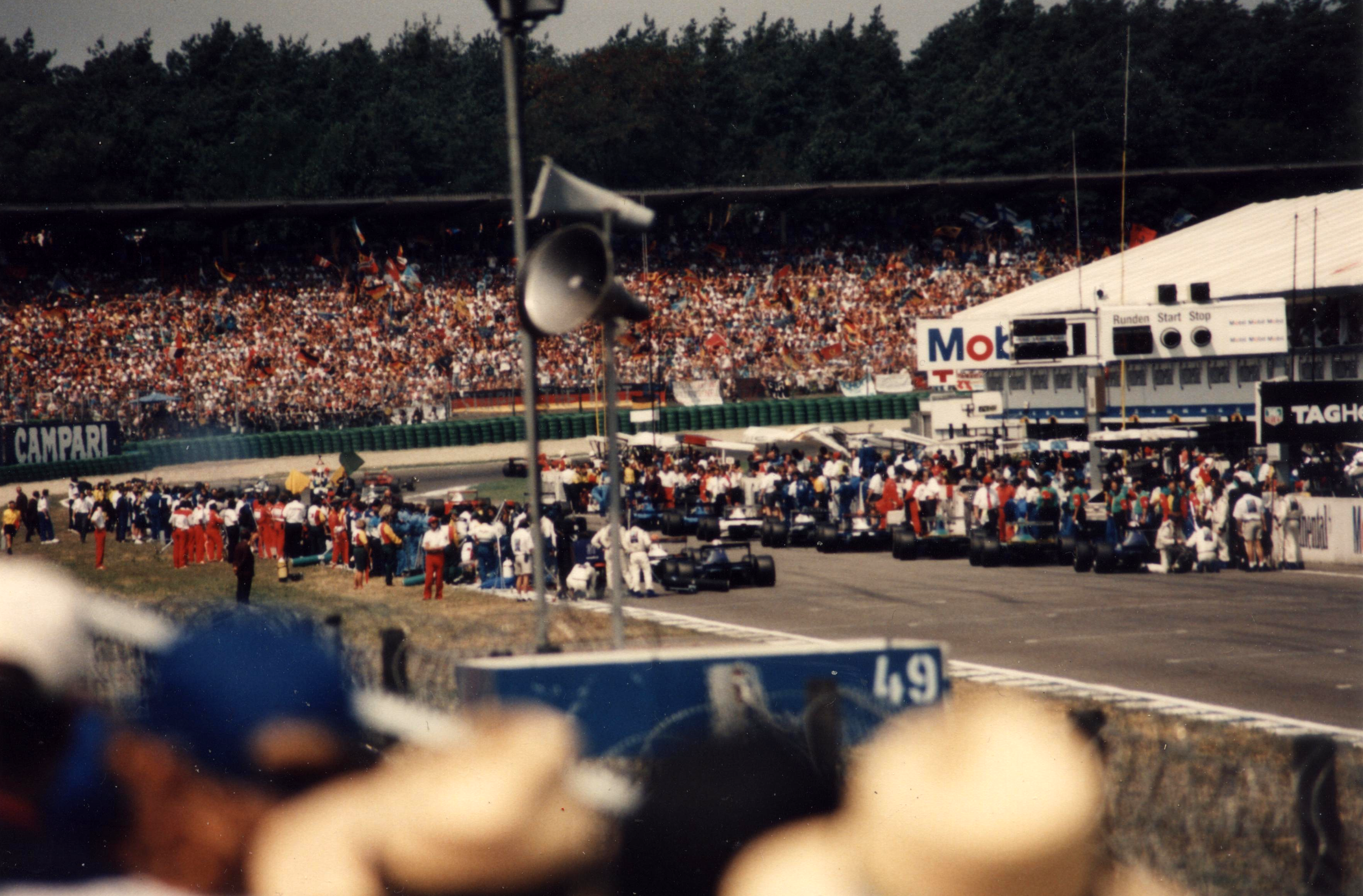
The starting grid

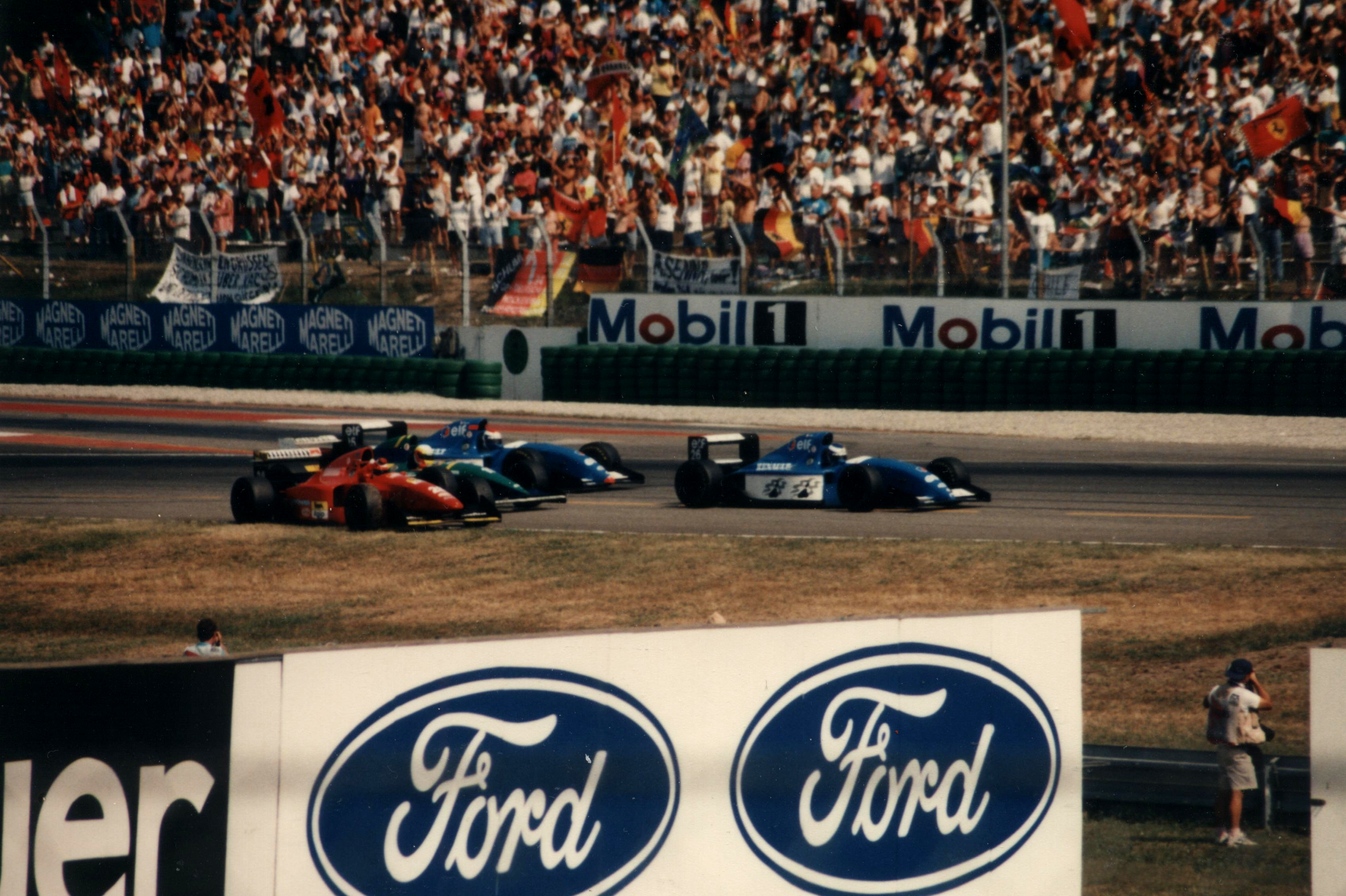
Gerhard Berger and the two Ligiers

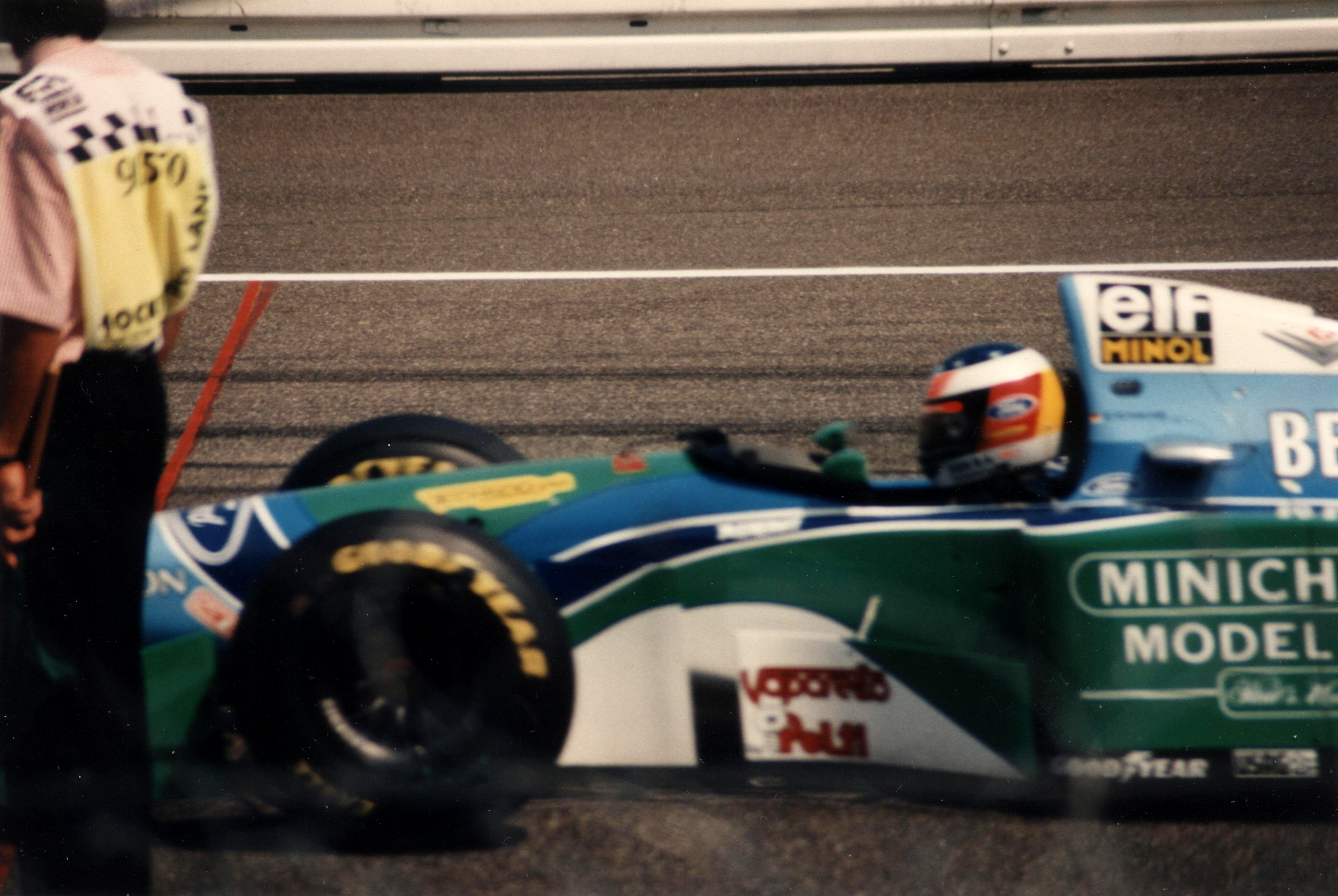
Michael Schumacher started fourth but retired from the race.

The 1994 German Grand Prix was a Formula One motor race held on 31 July 1994 at the Hockenheimring, Hockenheim. It was the ninth race of the 1994 Formula One World Championship.

The 45-lap race was won from pole position by Austrian driver Gerhard Berger, driving a Ferrari. Berger achieved the first victory for the Ferrari team since the 1990 Spanish Grand Prix, some 59 races previously. In a race of high attrition, including eleven retirements on the opening lap, only eight cars finished, with French drivers Olivier Panis and Éric Bernard second and third respectively in their Ligier-Renaults.

== Background ==
The fast Hockenheim circuit had been modified from the year before, with the fast Senna chicane being made slower.

== Qualifying report ==
The Ferraris filled the front row of the grid, Gerhard Berger taking pole position by 0.43 seconds from Jean Alesi. Damon Hill was third in his Williams, with Drivers' Championship leader Michael Schumacher fourth in his Benetton. The Tyrrells impressed with Ukyo Katayama fifth and Mark Blundell seventh, with David Coulthard between them in the second Williams. Completing the top ten were Mika Häkkinen in the McLaren, Heinz-Harald Frentzen in the Sauber and Eddie Irvine in the Jordan. Once again, the Pacifics of Paul Belmondo and Bertrand Gachot failed to qualify, with Belmondo, the faster of the two, nearly two seconds slower than the 26th and last qualifier, Jean-Marc Gounon in the Simtek.

=== Qualifying classification ===
Pos	No	Driver	Constructor	Q1 time	Q2 time	Gap
1	28	(Austria) Gerhard Berger	Ferrari	1:44.616	1:43.582	
2	27	(France) Jean Alesi	Ferrari	1:45.272	1:44.012	+0.430
3	0	(United Kingdom) Damon Hill	Williams-Renault	1:44.026	1:44.131	+0.444
4	5	(Germany) Michael Schumacher	Benetton-Ford	1:44.875	1:44.268	+0.686
5	3	(Japan) Ukyo Katayama	Tyrrell-Yamaha	1:46.534	1:44.718	+1.136
6	2	(United Kingdom) David Coulthard	Williams-Renault	1:45.477	1:45.146	+1.564
7	4	(United Kingdom) Mark Blundell	Tyrrell-Yamaha	1:45.814	1:45.474	+1.892
8	7	(Finland) Mika Häkkinen	McLaren-Peugeot	1:45.487	1:45.878	+1.905
9	30	(Germany) Heinz-Harald Frentzen	Sauber-Mercedes	1:46.488	1:45.893	+2.311
10	15	(United Kingdom) Eddie Irvine	Jordan-Hart	1:45.911	1:45.942	+2.329
11	14	(Brazil) Rubens Barrichello	Jordan-Hart	1:45.962	1:45.939	+2.357
12	26	(France) Olivier Panis	Ligier-Renault	1:47.925	1:46.185	+2.603
13	8	(United Kingdom) Martin Brundle	McLaren-Peugeot	1:46.644	1:46.218	+2.636
14	25	(France) Éric Bernard	Ligier-Renault	1:47.531	1:46.290	+2.708
15	12	(United Kingdom) Johnny Herbert	Lotus-Mugen-Honda	1:48.621	1:46.630	+3.048
16	10	(Italy) Gianni Morbidelli	Footwork-Ford	1:47.814	1:46.817	+3.235
17	9	(Brazil) Christian Fittipaldi	Footwork-Ford	1:47.150	1:47.102	+3.520
18	29	(Italy) Andrea de Cesaris	Sauber-Mercedes	1:47.745	1:47.235	+3.653
19	6	(Netherlands) Jos Verstappen	Benetton-Ford	40:34.496	1:47.316	+3.734
20	23	(Italy) Pierluigi Martini	Minardi-Ford	1:47.831	1:47.402	+3.820
21	11	(Italy) Alessandro Zanardi	Lotus-Mugen-Honda	1:47.678	1:47.425	+3.843
22	20	(France) Érik Comas	Larrousse-Ford	1:48.770	1:48.229	+4.647
23	24	(Italy) Michele Alboreto	Minardi-Ford	1:48.402	1:48.295	+4.713
24	19	(Monaco) Olivier Beretta	Larrousse-Ford	1:48.681	1:48.875	+5.099
25	31	(Australia) David Brabham	Simtek-Ford	1:50.685	1:48.870	+5.288
26	32	(France) Jean-Marc Gounon	Simtek-Ford	1:50.361	1:49.204	+5.622
DNQ	33	(France) Paul Belmondo	Pacific-Ilmor	1:51.916	1:51.122	+7.540
DNQ	34	(France) Bertrand Gachot	Pacific-Ilmor	1:52.839	1:51.292	+7.710

== Race report ==
The race was notable for its high rate of attrition, with 11 retirements on the opening lap. Within ten seconds of the start Alessandro Zanardi and Andrea de Cesaris tangled towards the back of the pack, taking out both Michele Alboreto and Pierluigi Martini before even reaching the first corner. Mika Häkkinen and David Coulthard then tangled going into the first corner, the Finn sliding in front of a group of cars into the wall on the outside of the circuit while the Scot continued to the pits to replace his front wing. Unfortunately, for the cars that had been eliminated, the Clerk of the Course opted not to red flag the race.

Mark Blundell braked hard to avoid the McLaren only to be hit from behind by Eddie Irvine, while Rubens Barrichello and Heinz-Harald Frentzen had nowhere to go but the gravel. Barrichello retired on the spot, but Frentzen stopped towards the end of the lap with broken suspension and a punctured tyre. In the melee behind this incident, Johnny Herbert and Martin Brundle tangled, the McLaren spinning out and the Lotus retiring later on in the lap with a broken front suspension. Damon Hill also damaged his suspension in a first-lap contact with Ukyo Katayama and, along with a very long pitstop, circulated outside the points for the remainder of the race. This result would have significant consequences for Hill at the end of the season.

Meanwhile Jean Alesi had gotten away unscathed, having qualified second, only for his Ferrari to stop with electrical problems on the run to the first chicane. It was a bad weekend for the Benetton team. After the first lap mayhem, Schumacher went on to take on the leading Ferrari of Gerhard Berger but fell away with engine problems very quickly. Then, a few laps later, Benetton driver Jos Verstappen also came into the pits; while refuelling, some fuel was accidentally sprayed onto the hot bodywork of the car, and a few seconds later the fuel ignited and Verstappen's car was engulfed in a ball of flames. The Dutchman escaped the incident with burns around his eyes, as he had his visor up during the pit stop. No other crew members or any persons were injured severely. As well as Ferrari winning its first and only race of the 1994 Formula One season (and the first Ferrari win since the 1990 Spanish Grand Prix), the race was especially good for Ligier with Olivier Panis finishing second, in his first career podium in Formula One, and Éric Bernard coming home third, achieving his only podium. Christian Fittipaldi finished fourth, scoring what would be his last points in Formula One, ahead of Gianni Morbidelli in fifth. Érik Comas finished sixth achieving his and Larrousse's last Formula One points.

=== Race classification ===
Pos	No	Driver	Constructor	Laps	Time/Retired	Grid	Points
1	28	(Austria) Gerhard Berger	Ferrari	45	1:22:37.272	1	10
2	26	(France) Olivier Panis	Ligier-Renault	45	+ 54.779	12	6
3	25	(France) Éric Bernard	Ligier-Renault	45	+ 1:05.042	14	4
4	9	(Brazil) Christian Fittipaldi	Footwork-Ford	45	+ 1:21.609	17	3
5	10	(Italy) Gianni Morbidelli	Footwork-Ford	45	+ 1:30.544	16	2
6	20	(France) Érik Comas	Larrousse-Ford	45	+ 1:45.445	22	1
7	19	(Monaco) Olivier Beretta	Larrousse-Ford	44	+ 1 lap	24	
8	0	(United Kingdom) Damon Hill	Williams-Renault	44	+ 1 lap	3	
Ret	32	(France) Jean-Marc Gounon	Simtek-Ford	39	Engine	26	
Ret	31	(Australia) David Brabham	Simtek-Ford	37	Clutch	25	
Ret	5	(Germany) Michael Schumacher	Benetton-Ford	20	Engine	4	
Ret	8	(United Kingdom) Martin Brundle	McLaren-Peugeot	19	Engine	13	
Ret	2	(United Kingdom) David Coulthard	Williams-Renault	17	Electrical	6	
Ret	6	(Netherlands) Jos Verstappen	Benetton-Ford	15	Pit fire	19	
Ret	3	(Japan) Ukyo Katayama	Tyrrell-Yamaha	6	Throttle	5	
Ret	27	(France) Jean Alesi	Ferrari	0	Electrical	2	
Ret	4	(United Kingdom) Mark Blundell	Tyrrell-Yamaha	0	Collision	7	
Ret	7	(Finland) Mika Häkkinen	McLaren-Peugeot	0	Collision	8	
Ret	30	(Germany) Heinz-Harald Frentzen	Sauber-Mercedes	0	Collision	9	
Ret	15	(United Kingdom) Eddie Irvine	Jordan-Hart	0	Collision	10	
Ret	14	(Brazil) Rubens Barrichello	Jordan-Hart	0	Collision	11	
Ret	12	(United Kingdom) Johnny Herbert	Lotus-Mugen-Honda	0	Collision	15	
Ret	29	(Italy) Andrea de Cesaris	Sauber-Mercedes	0	Collision	18	
Ret	23	(Italy) Pierluigi Martini	Minardi-Ford	0	Collision	20	
Ret	11	(Italy) Alessandro Zanardi	Lotus-Mugen-Honda	0	Collision	21	
Ret	24	(Italy) Michele Alboreto	Minardi-Ford	0	Collision	23	

== Championship standings after the race ==
Drivers' Championship standings

Pos	Driver	Points
1	(Germany) Michael Schumacher	66
2	(United Kingdom) Damon Hill	39
3	(Austria) Gerhard Berger	27
4	(France) Jean Alesi	19
5	(Brazil) Rubens Barrichello	10

Constructors' Championship standings

Pos	Constructor	Points
1	(United Kingdom) Benetton-Ford	67
2	(Italy) Ferrari	52
3	(United Kingdom) Williams-Renault	43
4	(United Kingdom) McLaren-Peugeot	14
5	(Republic of Ireland) Jordan-Hart	14

Previous race: 1994 British Grand Prix	FIA Formula One World Championship; 1994 season	Next race: 1994 Hungarian Grand Prix
Previous race: 1993 German Grand Prix	German Grand Prix	Next race: 1995 German Grand Prix
