= 1994 British Grand Prix =

- Race 8 of 16 in the 1994 Formula One World Championship
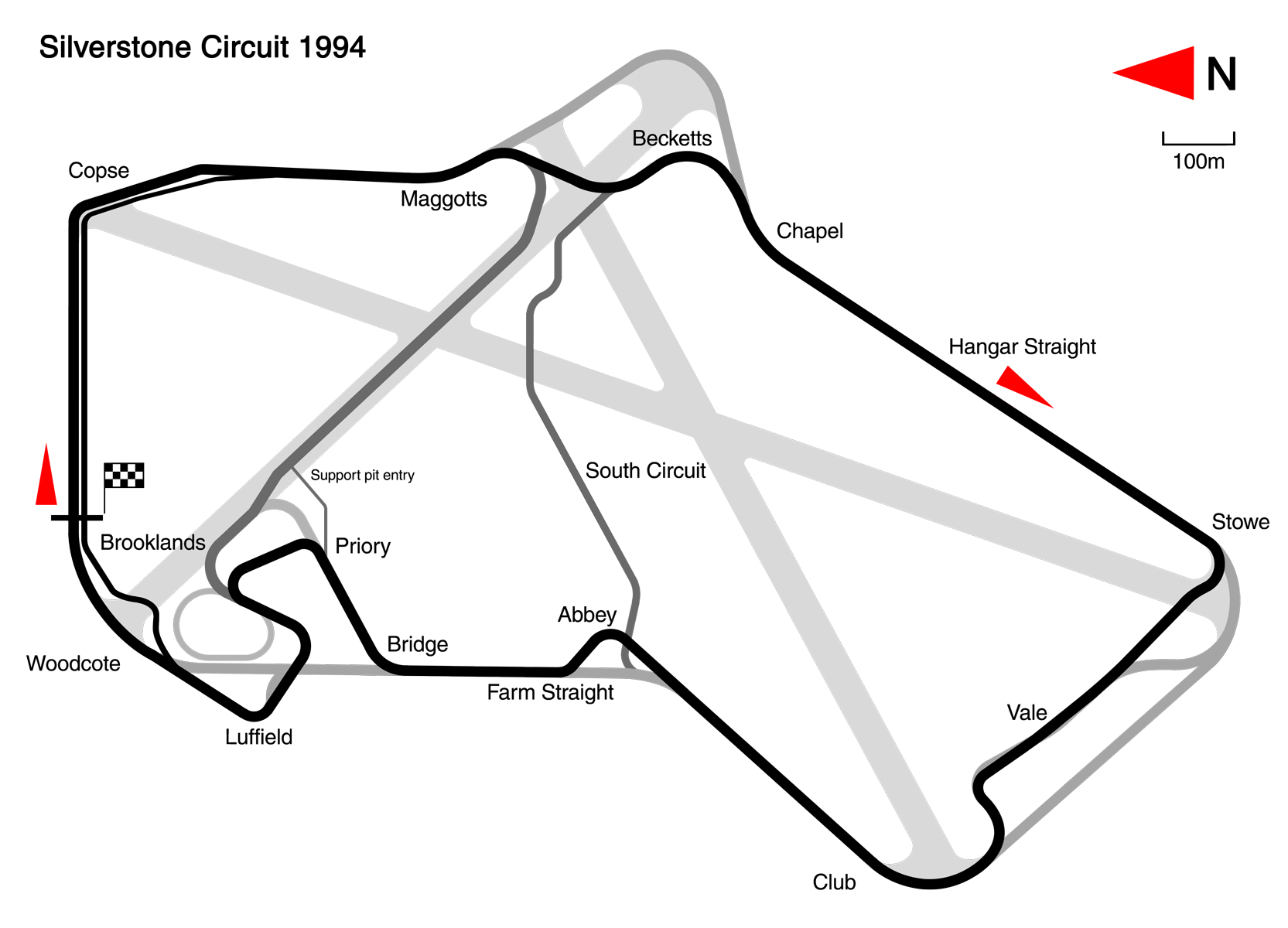
- Silverstone Circuit (as modified in 1994)

Race details
- Date: 10 July 1994
- Official name: XLVII British Grand Prix
- Location: Silverstone Circuit, Silverstone, Northamptonshire, England
- Course: Permanent racing facility
- Course length: 5.057 km (3.160 miles)
- Distance: 60 laps, 303.420 km (189.637 miles)
- Weather: Sunny

Pole position
Driver	(United Kingdom) Damon Hill	Williams-Renault
- Time: 1:24.960

Fastest lap
Driver	(United Kingdom) Damon Hill	Williams-Renault
- Time: 1:27.100 on lap 11

Podium
First	(United Kingdom) Damon Hill	Williams-Renault
Second	(France) Jean Alesi	Ferrari
Third	(Finland) Mika Häkkinen	McLaren-Peugeot

The 1994 British Grand Prix was a Formula One motor race held at Silverstone on 10 July 1994. It was the eighth race of the 1994 Formula One World Championship.

The 60-lap race was won from pole position by local driver Damon Hill, driving a Williams-Renault. Drivers' Championship leader, German Michael Schumacher, crossed the line second in his Benetton-Ford, but was subsequently disqualified for overtaking Hill on the formation lap and failing to serve a stop-go penalty in time; he was also given a two-race ban that he served at the Italian and Portuguese Grands Prix. Frenchman Jean Alesi was thus classified second in his Ferrari, with Finn Mika Häkkinen third in a McLaren-Peugeot.

== Report ==
=== Pre-race ===
Going into this race, Benetton's Michael Schumacher led the Drivers' Championship with 66 points out of a possible 70. Williams' Damon Hill was second on 29 points, followed by Ferrari drivers Gerhard Berger and Jean Alesi on 17 and 13 respectively. Benetton led the Constructors' Championship with 67 points, followed by Ferrari on 36 and Williams on 31.

Following his appearance at the previous round in France, Nigel Mansell had returned to his CART commitments in America, so David Coulthard returned in the second Williams to partner Hill.

=== Qualifying ===
Qualifying was extremely close with Hill, Schumacher and Berger in competition for pole position. Berger collided with the barrier at the end of the pitlane as he attempted to have another lap. Hill took pole position with a time of 1:24.960. Schumacher took second position on the grid, three thousandths of a second slower than Hill and Berger third, two hundredths of a second behind Hill.

=== Race ===
On the formation lap, Schumacher overtook Hill twice (once when leaving the dummy grid, and then once more further round the lap), before dropping back to take his second place on the grid for the start.

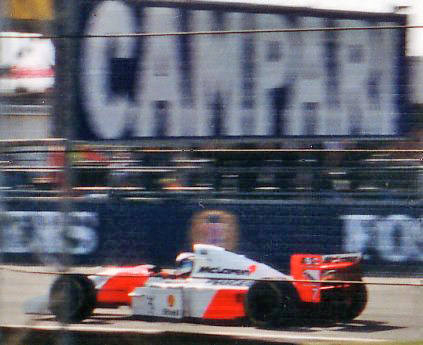
Mika Häkkinen finished third in a McLaren-Peugeot.

David Coulthard stalled on the grid at the start, forcing him to start from the back of the grid – he fought back to finish 5th. This prompted another formation lap, on which Eddie Irvine's car broke down. Again on this second formation lap, Schumacher overtook Hill twice. The Peugeot V10 engine in Martin Brundle's McLaren MP4/9 failed on the second start in a huge fireball.

Hill led opening laps of the race, until he pitted at the end of lap 14. On same lap Michael Schumacher was handed a five-second stop-go penalty for overtaking Hill on the first formation lap. Schumacher pitted on lap 17, but he didn't serve the penalty. That put Berger into the lead, with Schumacher now ahead of Hill. Berger led until Schumacher passed him on lap 22, but since he failed to serve the penalty Schumacher was shown the black flag, requiring him to stop immediately at the pits. Schumacher did not acknowledge the black flag and was shown it again on both of the next two laps, he later claimed that he had not seen it. Benetton told the race officials that there had been a misunderstanding over the 5-second stop-go penalty, and after discussing the issue with the team the officials withdrew the black flag and Schumacher finally served the stop-go penalty at the end of lap 27. This gave Hill the lead, where he remained for the rest of the race. Schumacher rejoined second, almost 20s behind Hill.

Mika Häkkinen and Rubens Barrichello collided while battling for 4th place at the final corner. Barrichello pulled his damaged car into the pits, without realising that he was on the final lap. This allowed Häkkinen to limp over the finish line before Barrichello reached it, despite his car being more severely damaged. Hill won the race 15 seconds ahead of Schumacher and Jean Alesi took last step on the podium.

Behind them, Ukyo Katayama was seventh, but following Schumacher's disqualification he scored what proved to be his final point.

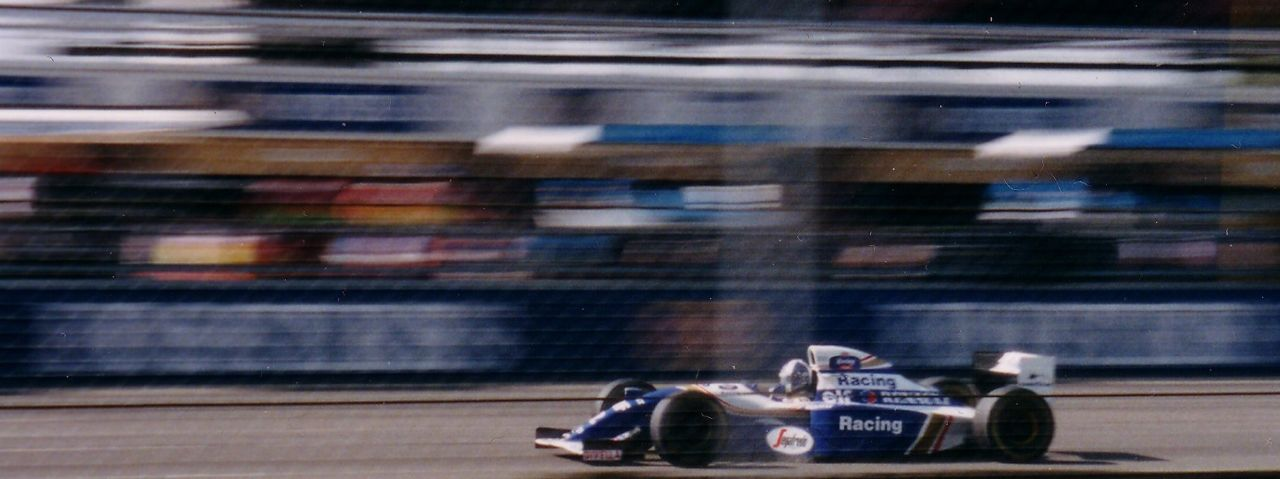
David Coulthard, in only his third Grand Prix, finished fifth in a Williams-Renault.

=== Post-race ===
The stewards fined Benetton $25,000 and gave the team and their driver Michael Schumacher a severe reprimand for ignoring Schumacher's five-second stop-go penalty and the subsequent black flag. On 26 July, the FIA World Motorsport Council increased the penalty to a $500,000 fine for the team and a two race ban for Schumacher. The WMSC also disqualified Schumacher from his second place at the British Grand Prix. The penalty was upheld on appeal on 30 August.

== Classification ==
=== Qualifying ===
Pos	No	Driver	Constructor	Q1 Time	Q2 Time	Gap
1	0	(United Kingdom) Damon Hill	Williams-Renault	1:26.894	1:24.960	
2	5	(Germany) Michael Schumacher	Benetton-Ford	1:26.323	1:24.963	+0.003
3	28	(Austria) Gerhard Berger	Ferrari	1:26.738	1:24.980	+0.020
4	27	(France) Jean Alesi	Ferrari	1:26.891	1:25.541	+0.581
5	7	(Finland) Mika Häkkinen	McLaren-Peugeot	1:27.983	1:26.268	+1.308
6	14	(Brazil) Rubens Barrichello	Jordan-Hart	1:27.890	1:26.271	+1.311
7	2	(United Kingdom) David Coulthard	Williams-Renault	1:27.698	1:26.337	+1.377
8	3	(Japan) Ukyo Katayama	Tyrrell-Yamaha	1:27.936	1:26.414	+1.454
9	8	(United Kingdom) Martin Brundle	McLaren-Peugeot	1:28.224	1:26.768	+1.808
10	6	(Netherlands) Jos Verstappen	Benetton-Ford	1:29.142	1:26.841	+1.881
11	4	(United Kingdom) Mark Blundell	Tyrrell-Yamaha	1:28.510	1:26.920	+1.960
12	15	(United Kingdom) Eddie Irvine	Jordan-Hart	1:27.890	1:27.065	+2.105
13	30	(Germany) Heinz-Harald Frentzen	Sauber-Mercedes	1:27.284	1:28.231	+2.324
14	23	(Italy) Pierluigi Martini	Minardi-Ford	1:28.517	1:27.522	+2.562
15	26	(France) Olivier Panis	Ligier-Renault	1:29.381	1:27.785	+2.825
16	10	(Italy) Gianni Morbidelli	Footwork-Ford	1:28.159	1:27.886	+2.926
17	24	(Italy) Michele Alboreto	Minardi-Ford	1:29.403	1:28.100	+3.140
18	29	(Italy) Andrea de Cesaris	Sauber-Mercedes	1:30.034	1:28.212	+3.252
19	11	(Italy) Alessandro Zanardi	Lotus-Mugen-Honda	1:29.240	1:28.225	+3.265
20	9	(Brazil) Christian Fittipaldi	Footwork-Ford	1:28.816	1:28.231	+3.271
21	12	(United Kingdom) Johnny Herbert	Lotus-Mugen-Honda	1:29.268	1:28.340	+3.380
22	20	(France) Érik Comas	Larrousse-Ford	1:30.274	1:28.519	+3.559
23	25	(France) Éric Bernard	Ligier-Renault	1:30.058	1:28.955	+3.995
24	19	(Monaco) Olivier Beretta	Larrousse-Ford	1:29.971	1:29.299	+4.339
25	31	(Australia) David Brabham	Simtek-Ford	1:31.437	1:30.690	+5.730
26	32	(France) Jean-Marc Gounon	Simtek-Ford	1:31.225	1:30.722	+5.762
DNQ	34	(France) Bertrand Gachot	Pacific-Ilmor	1:31.496	1:31.877	+6.536
DNQ	33	(France) Paul Belmondo	Pacific-Ilmor	1:34.631	1:32.507	+7.547

=== Race ===
Pos	No	Driver	Constructor	Laps	Time/Retired	Grid	Points
1	0	(United Kingdom) Damon Hill	Williams-Renault	60	1:30:03.640	1	10
2	27	(France) Jean Alesi	Ferrari	60	+ 1:08.128	4	6
3	7	(Finland) Mika Häkkinen	McLaren-Peugeot	60	+ 1:40.659	5	4
4	14	(Brazil) Rubens Barrichello	Jordan-Hart	60	+ 1:41.751	6	3
5	2	(United Kingdom) David Coulthard	Williams-Renault	59	+ 1 lap	7	2
6	3	(Japan) Ukyo Katayama	Tyrrell-Yamaha	59	+ 1 lap	8	1
7	30	(Germany) Heinz-Harald Frentzen	Sauber-Mercedes	59	+ 1 lap	13	
8	6	(Netherlands) Jos Verstappen	Benetton-Ford	59	+ 1 lap	10	
9	9	(Brazil) Christian Fittipaldi	Footwork-Ford	58	+ 2 laps	20	
10	23	(Italy) Pierluigi Martini	Minardi-Ford	58	+ 2 laps	14	
11	12	(United Kingdom) Johnny Herbert	Lotus-Mugen-Honda	58	+ 2 laps	21	
12	26	(France) Olivier Panis	Ligier-Renault	58	+ 2 laps	15	
13	25	(France) Éric Bernard	Ligier-Renault	58	+ 2 laps	23	
14	19	(Monaco) Olivier Beretta	Larrousse-Ford	58	+ 2 laps	24	
15	31	(Australia) David Brabham	Simtek-Ford	57	+ 3 laps	25	
16	32	(France) Jean-Marc Gounon	Simtek-Ford	57	+ 3 laps	26	
Ret	24	(Italy) Michele Alboreto	Minardi-Ford	48	Engine	17	
Ret	28	(Austria) Gerhard Berger	Ferrari	32	Engine	3	
Ret	4	(United Kingdom) Mark Blundell	Tyrrell-Yamaha	20	Gearbox	11	
Ret	20	(France) Érik Comas	Larrousse-Ford	12	Engine	22	
Ret	29	(Italy) Andrea de Cesaris	Sauber-Mercedes	11	Engine	18	
Ret	10	(Italy) Gianni Morbidelli	Footwork-Ford	5	Engine	16	
Ret	11	(Italy) Alessandro Zanardi	Lotus-Mugen-Honda	4	Engine	PL	
Ret	8	(United Kingdom) Martin Brundle	McLaren-Peugeot	0	Engine	9	
DNS	15	(United Kingdom) Eddie Irvine	Jordan-Hart	0	Engine	12	
DSQ	5	(Germany) Michael Schumacher	Benetton-Ford	60	Ignored black flag	2	

== Championship standings after the race ==
Drivers' Championship standings

Pos	Driver	Points
1	(Germany) Michael Schumacher	66
2	(United Kingdom) Damon Hill	39
3	(France) Jean Alesi	19
4	(Austria) Gerhard Berger	17
5	(Brazil) Rubens Barrichello	10

Constructors' Championship standings

Pos	Constructor	Points
1	(United Kingdom) Benetton-Ford	67
2	(United Kingdom) Williams-Renault	43
3	(Italy) Ferrari	42
4	(United Kingdom) McLaren-Peugeot	14
5	(Republic of Ireland) Jordan-Hart	14

Previous race: 1994 French Grand Prix	FIA Formula One World Championship; 1994 season	Next race: 1994 German Grand Prix
Previous race: 1993 British Grand Prix	British Grand Prix	Next race: 1995 British Grand Prix
