= 1993 French Grand Prix =

- Race 8 of 16 in the 1993 Formula One World Championship

Race details
- Date: 4 July 1993
- Official name: Rhône-Poulenc Grand Prix de France
- Location: Circuit de Nevers Magny-Cours; Magny-Cours, France
- Course: Permanent racing facility
- Course length: 4.250 km (2.651 miles)
- Distance: 72 laps, 306.000 km (190.892 miles)

Pole position
Driver	(United Kingdom) Damon Hill	Williams-Renault
- Time: 1:14.382

Fastest lap
Driver	(Germany) Michael Schumacher	Benetton-Ford
- Time: 1:19.256 on lap 47

Podium
First	(France) Alain Prost	Williams-Renault
Second	(United Kingdom) Damon Hill	Williams-Renault
Third	(Germany) Michael Schumacher	Benetton-Ford

The 1993 French Grand Prix was a Formula One motor race held at Magny-Cours on 4 July 1993. It was the eighth race of the 1993 Formula One World Championship.

The 72-lap race was won by home favourite Alain Prost, driving a Williams-Renault, after he started from second position. Prost's British teammate Damon Hill finished second, having started from pole position and led the first 26 laps, with German Michael Schumacher third in a Benetton-Ford. With Prost's Brazilian rival Ayrton Senna finishing fourth in his McLaren-Ford, Prost extended his lead in the Drivers' Championship to 12 points.

The race marked Prost's 100th Formula One podium, making him the first driver to achieve the milestone. It was also the last Grand Prix for Fabrizio Barbazza.

This was the first race to feature BBC commentary from Jonathan Palmer, replacing James Hunt after his death following the Canadian Grand Prix. Palmer would partner Murray Walker until the conclusion of the 1996 season when the television rights went to ITV for 1997.

== Qualifying report ==
With local hero Alain Prost taking pole position in all of the previous seven races, there was a massive turnout for qualifying where the Williams were usually dominant. The Williams did take 1-2 in qualifying, but it was Damon Hill who took his first Formula One pole, 0.142 seconds ahead of Prost. The Ligier team, in its home race, filled the second row with Martin Brundle ahead of Mark Blundell, and thus completed a 1-2-3-4 for Renault-powered cars. Ayrton Senna in the McLaren and Jean Alesi in the Ferrari were on the third row, Michael Schumacher in the Benetton and Rubens Barrichello in the Jordan made up the fourth, and the Larrousse team, also contesting its home race, took up the fifth with Érik Comas ahead of Philippe Alliot. For the fourth time in five races, Michele Alboreto came last in his Lola and thus failed to qualify.

=== Qualifying classification ===
Pos	No	Driver	Constructor	Q1	Q2	Gap
1	0	(United Kingdom) Damon Hill	Williams-Renault	1:15.051	1:14.382	
2	2	(France) Alain Prost	Williams-Renault	1:15.725	1:14.524	+0.142
3	25	(United Kingdom) Martin Brundle	Ligier-Renault	1:16.847	1:16.169	+1.787
4	26	(United Kingdom) Mark Blundell	Ligier-Renault	1:16.834	1:16.203	+1.821
5	8	(Brazil) Ayrton Senna	McLaren-Ford	1:16.782	1:16.264	+1.882
6	27	(France) Jean Alesi	Ferrari	1:16.825	1:16.662	+2.280
7	5	(Germany) Michael Schumacher	Benetton-Ford	1:16.720	1:16.745	+2.338
8	14	(Brazil) Rubens Barrichello	Jordan-Hart	1:17.345	1:17.168	+2.786
9	20	(France) Érik Comas	Larrousse-Lamborghini	1:18.180	1:17.170	+2.788
10	19	(France) Philippe Alliot	Larrousse-Lamborghini	1:18.230	1:17.190	+2.808
11	29	(Austria) Karl Wendlinger	Sauber	1:17.650	1:17.315	+2.933
12	6	(Italy) Riccardo Patrese	Benetton-Ford	1:17.675	1:17.362	+2.980
13	10	(Japan) Aguri Suzuki	Footwork-Mugen-Honda	1:17.441	1:17.518	+3.059
14	28	(Austria) Gerhard Berger	Ferrari	1:18.741	1:17.456	+3.074
15	9	(United Kingdom) Derek Warwick	Footwork-Mugen-Honda	1:19.180	1:17.598	+3.216
16	7	(United States) Michael Andretti	McLaren-Ford	1:18.585	1:17.659	+3.277
17	11	(Italy) Alessandro Zanardi	Lotus-Ford	1:18.331	1:17.706	+3.324
18	30	(Finland) JJ Lehto	Sauber	1:19.252	1:17.812	+3.430
19	12	(United Kingdom) Johnny Herbert	Lotus-Ford	1:17.862	1:18.104	+3.480
20	15	(Belgium) Thierry Boutsen	Jordan-Hart	1:18.685	1:17.997	+3.615
21	3	(Japan) Ukyo Katayama	Tyrrell-Yamaha	1:20.553	1:19.143	+4.761
22	22	(Italy) Luca Badoer	Lola-Ferrari	1:21.931	1:19.493	+5.111
23	23	(Brazil) Christian Fittipaldi	Minardi-Ford	1:19.968	1:19.519	+5.137
24	24	(Italy) Fabrizio Barbazza	Minardi-Ford	1:21.113	1:19.691	+5.309
25	4	(Italy) Andrea de Cesaris	Tyrrell-Yamaha	1:21.024	1:19.856	+5.474
DNQ	21	(Italy) Michele Alboreto	Lola-Ferrari	1:22.106	1:20.130	+5.748

== Race report ==
At the start, the top five stayed the same while Schumacher got ahead of Alesi. Hill led from Prost, Brundle, Blundell, Senna and Schumacher.

The Williams pulled away while Brundle pulled away from Blundell who was holding up Senna and Schumacher. However, this ended when Blundell was pushed off the road and into retirement on lap 21 as he attempted to lap de Cesaris. It was time for the mid-race stops during which Prost got ahead of Hill and Senna and Schumacher closed up on Brundle.

During the second stops, Prost stayed ahead - just by two-tenths while Senna and Schumacher got ahead of Brundle. Schumacher passed Senna when the two were going through traffic and pulled away. Prost won with Hill right behind to make it a Williams 1-2 ahead of Schumacher, Senna, Brundle and Andretti.

Thus, at the halfway stage of the season, Prost led the World Championship with 57 points. Senna was a further 12 points behind in second with 45, Hill was third with 28, Schumacher was fourth with 24, Brundle fifth with 9, Blundell sixth with 6, Herbert seventh with 6 and Lehto eighth with 5. There were no real battles in the Constructors Championship with Williams comfortably leading with 85 points with McLaren 37 points behind in second with 48. Benetton were third with 29 and Ligier were fourth with 15.

By winning the race, Prost became the first Formula One driver to reach 100 career podiums.

=== Race classification ===
Pos	No	Driver	Constructor	Laps	Time/Retired	Grid	Points
1	2	(France) Alain Prost	Williams-Renault	72	1:38:35.241	2	10
2	0	(United Kingdom) Damon Hill	Williams-Renault	72	+ 0.342	1	6
3	5	(Germany) Michael Schumacher	Benetton-Ford	72	+ 21.209	7	4
4	8	(Brazil) Ayrton Senna	McLaren-Ford	72	+ 32.405	5	3
5	25	(United Kingdom) Martin Brundle	Ligier-Renault	72	+ 33.795	3	2
6	7	(United States) Michael Andretti	McLaren-Ford	71	+ 1 lap	16	1
7	14	(Brazil) Rubens Barrichello	Jordan-Hart	71	+ 1 lap	8	
8	23	(Brazil) Christian Fittipaldi	Minardi-Ford	71	+ 1 lap	23	
9	19	(France) Philippe Alliot	Larrousse-Lamborghini	70	+ 2 laps	10	
10	6	(Italy) Riccardo Patrese	Benetton-Ford	70	+ 2 laps	12	
11	15	(Belgium) Thierry Boutsen	Jordan-Hart	70	+ 2 laps	20	
12	10	(Japan) Aguri Suzuki	Footwork-Mugen-Honda	70	+ 2 laps	13	
13	9	(United Kingdom) Derek Warwick	Footwork-Mugen-Honda	70	+ 2 laps	15	
14	28	(Austria) Gerhard Berger	Ferrari	70	+ 2 laps	14	
15	4	(Italy) Andrea de Cesaris	Tyrrell-Yamaha	68	+ 4 laps	25	
16	20	(France) Érik Comas	Larrousse-Lamborghini	66	Gearbox	9	
Ret	27	(France) Jean Alesi	Ferrari	47	Engine	6	
Ret	22	(Italy) Luca Badoer	Lola-Ferrari	28	Suspension	22	
Ret	29	(Austria) Karl Wendlinger	Sauber	25	Gearbox	11	
Ret	30	(Finland) JJ Lehto	Sauber	22	Gearbox	18	
Ret	26	(United Kingdom) Mark Blundell	Ligier-Renault	20	Spun off	4	
Ret	12	(United Kingdom) Johnny Herbert	Lotus-Ford	16	Spun off	19	
Ret	24	(Italy) Fabrizio Barbazza	Minardi-Ford	16	Gearbox	24	
Ret	3	(Japan) Ukyo Katayama	Tyrrell-Yamaha	12	Gearbox	21	
Ret	11	(Italy) Alessandro Zanardi	Lotus-Ford	9	Suspension	17	

== Championship standings after the race ==
Drivers' Championship standings

Pos	Driver	Points
1	(France) Alain Prost	57
2	(Brazil) Ayrton Senna	45
3	(United Kingdom) Damon Hill	28
4	(Germany) Michael Schumacher	24
5	(United Kingdom) Martin Brundle	9

Constructors' Championship standings

Pos	Constructor	Points
1	(United Kingdom) Williams-Renault	85
2	(United Kingdom) McLaren-Ford	48
3	(United Kingdom) Benetton-Ford	29
4	(France) Ligier-Renault	15
5	(Italy) Ferrari	9

- Note: Only the top five positions are included for both sets of standings.

Previous race: 1993 Canadian Grand Prix	FIA Formula One World Championship; 1993 season	Next race: 1993 British Grand Prix
Previous race: 1992 French Grand Prix	French Grand Prix	Next race: 1994 French Grand Prix
