= 1993 South African Grand Prix =

- Race 1 of 16 in the 1993 Formula One World Championship
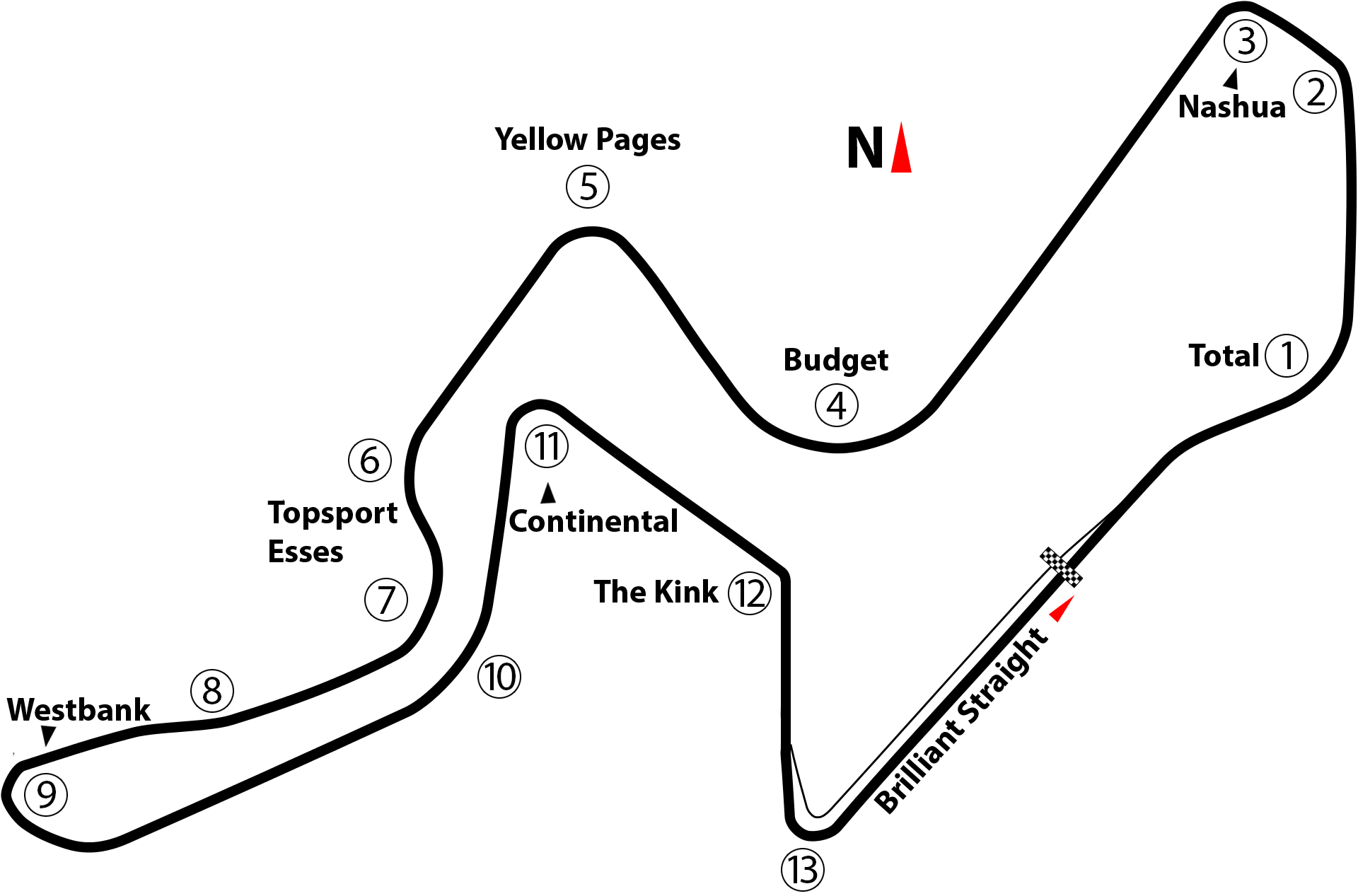

Race details
- Date: 14 March 1993
- Official name: Panasonic South African Grand Prix
- Location: Kyalami; Midrand, Transvaal Province, South Africa
- Course: Permanent racing facility
- Course length: 4.261 km (2.648 miles)
- Distance: 72 laps, 306.792 km (190.632 miles)
- Weather: Very hot and humid, with torrential thunderstorms. Air temp: 33 °C (91 °F)

Pole position
Driver	(France) Alain Prost	Williams-Renault
- Time: 1:15.696

Fastest lap
Driver	(France) Alain Prost	Williams-Renault
- Time: 1:19.492 on lap 40

Podium
First	(France) Alain Prost	Williams-Renault
Second	(Brazil) Ayrton Senna	McLaren-Ford
Third	(United Kingdom) Mark Blundell	Ligier-Renault

The 1993 South African Grand Prix was a Formula One motor race held at Kyalami on 14 March 1993. It was the first race of the 1993 Formula One World Championship.

The 72-lap race was won by Frenchman Alain Prost, driving a Williams-Renault. Prost, returning to Formula One after taking the 1992 season off, took pole position and led the last 49 laps, winning by over a minute from Brazilian Ayrton Senna in a McLaren-Ford. Briton Mark Blundell finished third in a Ligier-Renault.

This was the 33rd South African Grand Prix and, as of 2026, the most recent Formula One race held on the continent of Africa. The race also marked the debut of the Swiss Sauber team, who scored their first points courtesy of Finn JJ Lehto's fifth-place finish.

This was the first time since 1974 that the first race of a season did not feature the defending Drivers' Champion in the field (in 1974, Jackie Stewart was missing as he had retired following the death of his teammate and close friend François Cevert in 1973). Defending 1992 champion Nigel Mansell had moved to race in CART for the season. Since there was no defending Drivers' Champion in the field this season, defending Constructors' Champion Williams could not use No. 1 on either of its cars. Therefore, this was the first race since the 1973 United States Grand Prix that number 0 was used.

== Report ==
The season started off in Kyalami where Prost, in his first race with Williams, took pole ahead of Senna, Schumacher, Hill, Alesi and Lehto, impressing in Sauber's first Grand Prix. At the start, Prost was poor and Senna and Hill (who was already ahead of Schumacher) got ahead of him. Then, Hill spun in front of Prost and dropped well down the field, Prost being forced to back off and let Schumacher through to second. Senna led Schumacher, Prost, Lehto, Wendlinger and Alesi at the end of lap one.

Prost attacked Schumacher, took second on lap 13 and set off after Senna. Five laps later, he attacked into the first corner but Senna took the inside and defended. However, Senna could not do anything when Prost attacked on lap 25 with the inside line. He took the lead and motored off. Schumacher also passed Senna to take second soon after. Both of them pitted unlike Prost, but Senna was quicker and rejoined ahead.

Schumacher was in no mood to stay third and attacked Senna on lap 40. There was minor contact and Schumacher spun off into retirement. Patrese was third but he too spun off on lap 47, leaving Blundell's Ligier third and Fittipaldi's impressive Minardi in fourth. Prost won from Senna, Blundell, Fittipaldi, Lehto (who was lapped twice in early stages of the race) and Berger (he was out but was classified sixth).

== Classification ==
=== Qualifying ===
Pos	No	Driver	Constructor	Q1	Q2	Gap
1	2	(France) Alain Prost	Williams-Renault	1:16.804	1:15.696	
2	8	(Brazil) Ayrton Senna	McLaren-Ford	1:17.152	1:15.784	+0.088
3	5	(Germany) Michael Schumacher	Benetton-Ford	1:17.507	1:17.261	+1.565
4	0	(United Kingdom) Damon Hill	Williams-Renault	1:17.732	1:17.592	+1.896
5	27	(France) Jean Alesi	Ferrari	1:18.775	1:18.234	+2.538
6	30	(Finland) JJ Lehto	Sauber	1:19.120	1:18.664	+2.968
7	6	(Italy) Riccardo Patrese	Benetton-Ford	1:19.341	1:18.676	+2.980
8	26	(United Kingdom) Mark Blundell	Ligier-Renault	1:19.688	1:18.687	+2.991
9	7	(United States) Michael Andretti	McLaren-Ford	1:18.903	1:18.786	+3.090
10	29	(Austria) Karl Wendlinger	Sauber	1:20.365	1:18.950	+3.254
11	19	(France) Philippe Alliot	Larrousse-Lamborghini	1:19.350	1:19.034	+3.338
12	25	(United Kingdom) Martin Brundle	Ligier-Renault	1:19.138	1:19.457	+3.442
13	23	(Brazil) Christian Fittipaldi	Minardi-Ford	1:19.825	1:19.285	+3.589
14	14	(Brazil) Rubens Barrichello	Jordan-Hart	1:20.118	1:19.305	+3.609
15	28	(Austria) Gerhard Berger	Ferrari	1:20.066	1:19.386	+3.690
16	11	(Italy) Alessandro Zanardi	Lotus-Ford	1:20.150	1:19.396	+3.700
17	12	(United Kingdom) Johnny Herbert	Lotus-Ford	1:20.009	1:19.498	+3.802
18	15	(Italy) Ivan Capelli	Jordan-Hart	1:20.841	1:19.759	+4.063
19	20	(France) Érik Comas	Larrousse-Lamborghini	1:21.000	1:20.081	+4.385
20	10	(Japan) Aguri Suzuki	Footwork-Mugen-Honda	1:21.342	1:20.237	+4.541
21	3	(Japan) Ukyo Katayama	Tyrrell-Yamaha	1:20.401	1:20.479	+4.705
22	9	(United Kingdom) Derek Warwick	Footwork-Mugen-Honda	1:20.821	1:20.402	+4.706
23	4	(Italy) Andrea de Cesaris	Tyrrell-Yamaha	1:20.721	1:20.660	+4.964
24	24	(Italy) Fabrizio Barbazza	Minardi-Ford	1:20.994	1:21.195	+5.298
25	21	(Italy) Michele Alboreto	Lola-Ferrari	1:22.843	1:21.893	+6.197
26	22	(Italy) Luca Badoer	Lola-Ferrari	1:24.737	—	+9.041

=== Race ===
Pos	No	Driver	Constructor	Laps	Time/Retired	Grid	Points
1	2	(France) Alain Prost	Williams-Renault	72	1:38:45.082	1	10
2	8	(Brazil) Ayrton Senna	McLaren-Ford	72	+ 1:19.824	2	6
3	26	(United Kingdom) Mark Blundell	Ligier-Renault	71	+ 1 lap	8	4
4	23	(Brazil) Christian Fittipaldi	Minardi-Ford	71	+ 1 lap	13	3
5	30	(Finland) JJ Lehto	Sauber	70	+ 2 laps	6	2
6	28	(Austria) Gerhard Berger	Ferrari	69	Engine	15	1
7	9	(United Kingdom) Derek Warwick	Footwork-Mugen-Honda	69	Spun off	22	
Ret	25	(United Kingdom) Martin Brundle	Ligier-Renault	57	Spun off	12	
Ret	21	(Italy) Michele Alboreto	Lola-Ferrari	55	Overheating	25	
Ret	20	(France) Érik Comas	Larrousse-Lamborghini	51	Engine	19	
Ret	6	(Italy) Riccardo Patrese	Benetton-Ford	46	Spun off	7	
Ret	5	(Germany) Michael Schumacher	Benetton-Ford	39	Spun off	3	
Ret	12	(United Kingdom) Johnny Herbert	Lotus-Ford	38	Fuel system	17	
Ret	29	(Austria) Karl Wendlinger	Sauber	33	Engine	10	
Ret	14	(Brazil) Rubens Barrichello	Jordan-Hart	31	Gearbox	14	
Ret	27	(France) Jean Alesi	Ferrari	30	Suspension	5	
Ret	19	(France) Philippe Alliot	Larrousse-Lamborghini	27	Spun off	11	
Ret	24	(Italy) Fabrizio Barbazza	Minardi-Ford	21	Collision	24	
Ret	10	(Japan) Aguri Suzuki	Footwork-Mugen-Honda	21	Collision	20	
Ret	22	(Italy) Luca Badoer	Lola-Ferrari	20	Gearbox	26	
Ret	0	(United Kingdom) Damon Hill	Williams-Renault	16	Collision	4	
Ret	11	(Italy) Alessandro Zanardi	Lotus-Ford	16	Collision	16	
Ret	7	(United States) Michael Andretti	McLaren-Ford	4	Collision	9	
Ret	15	(Italy) Ivan Capelli	Jordan-Hart	2	Spun off	18	
Ret	3	(Japan) Ukyo Katayama	Tyrrell-Yamaha	1	Transmission	21	
Ret	4	(Italy) Andrea de Cesaris	Tyrrell-Yamaha	0	Transmission	23	

== Championship standings after the race ==
Drivers' Championship standings

Pos	Driver	Points
1	(France) Alain Prost	10
2	(Brazil) Ayrton Senna	6
3	(United Kingdom) Mark Blundell	4
4	(Brazil) Christian Fittipaldi	3
5	(Finland) JJ Lehto	2

Constructors' Championship standings

Pos	Constructor	Points
1	(United Kingdom) Williams-Renault	10
2	(United Kingdom) McLaren-Ford	6
3	(France) Ligier-Renault	4
4	(Italy) Minardi-Ford	3
5	(Switzerland) Sauber	2

- Note: Only the top five positions are included for both sets of standings.

Previous race: 1992 Australian Grand Prix	FIA Formula One World Championship; 1993 season	Next race: 1993 Brazilian Grand Prix
Previous race: 1992 South African Grand Prix	South African Grand Prix	Next race: N/A
