= AGS JH25B =

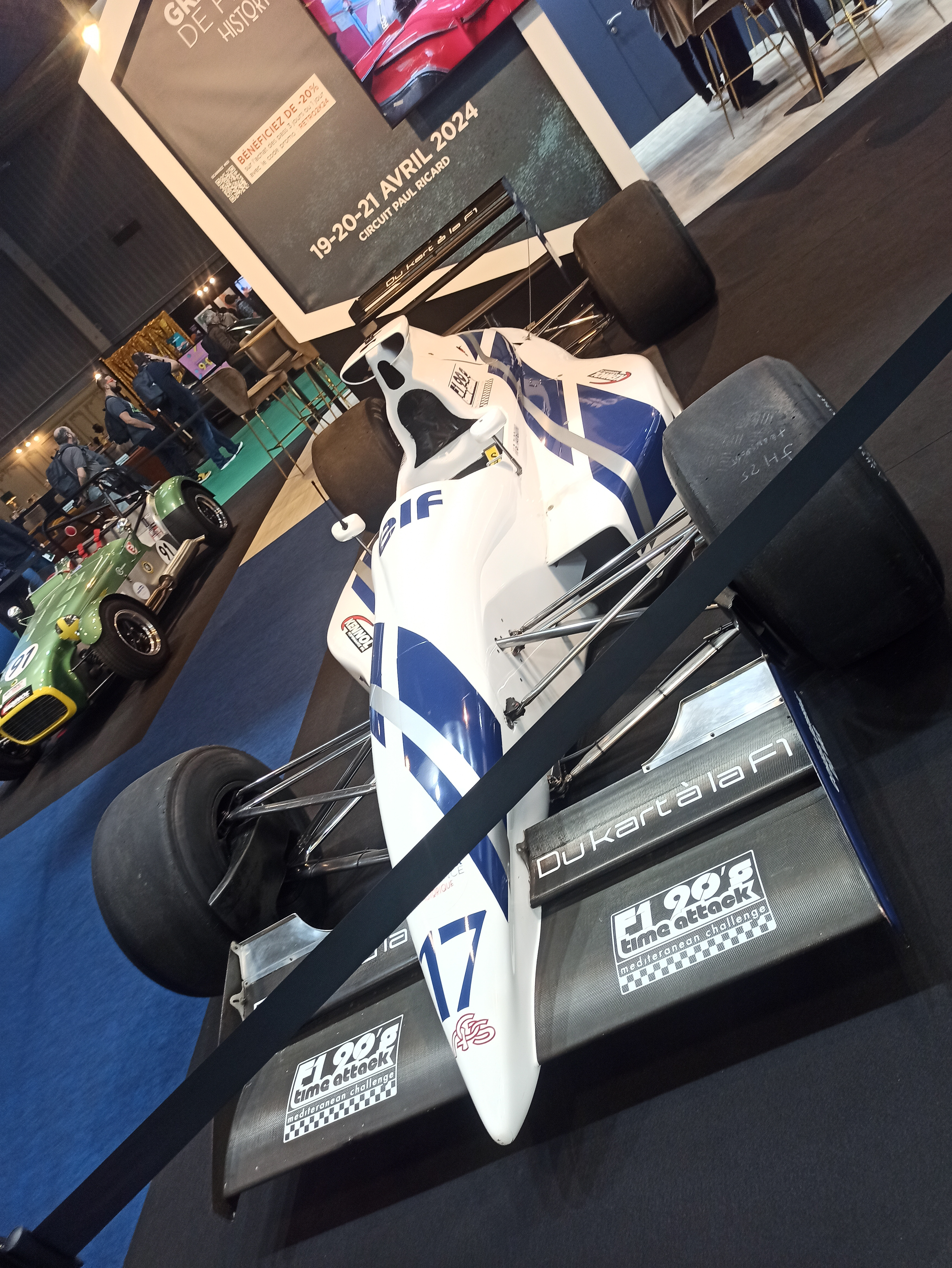
- Category: Formula One
- Constructor: AGS-Ford
- Designer: Michel Costa (Technical Director)
- Predecessor: AGS JH25
- Successor: AGS JH27

Technical specifications
- Chassis: Carbon fibre monocoque
- Length: 4,472 millimetres (176.1 in)
- Width: 2,236 millimetres (88.0 in)
- Height: 989 millimetres (38.9 in)
- Axle track: Front: 1,800 mm (71 in); Rear: 1,670 mm (66 in)
- Wheelbase: 2,881 millimetres (113.4 in)
- Engine: Ford Cosworth DFR 3,493 cubic centimetres (213.2 cu in; 3.493 L) V8 NA longitudinally mid-mounted
- Transmission: Hewland 6-speed Manual
- Power: 625 brake horsepower (634 PS; 466 kW) @ 12,500 rpm 540 newton-metres (400 lbf⋅ft) @ 8,500 rpm
- Weight: 505 kilograms (1,113 lb)
- Fuel: Elf
- Tyres: Goodyear

Competition history
- Notable entrants: Automobiles Gonfaronnaises Sportives
- Notable drivers: 17. (Italy) Gabriele Tarquini; 18. (Sweden) Stefan Johansson; 18. (Italy) Fabrizio Barbazza
- Debut: 1991 United States Grand Prix
- Last event: 1991 Italian Grand Prix
Races	Wins	Podiums	Poles	F/Laps
12	0	0	0	0
- Constructors' Championships: 0
- Drivers' Championships: 0

The AGS JH25B was a Formula One car designed by Michel Costa for use in the 1991 Formula one season by the French AGS team. It was powered by the 3.5-litre Ford DFR V8. The car was driven by Italian drivers Gabriele Tarquini, Fabrizio Barbazza, and Swedish driver Stefan Johansson.

The AGS JH25B's best – and only – result was 8th place by Tarquini at the United States Grand Prix. The car was unable to qualify for many of the 1991 races, and on the rare occasion it qualified, was retired from the race.

Automobiles Gonfaronnaises Sportives was experiencing financial problems and the team was not able to upgrade the car further. The car got slower and slower as spare parts were used up. The team was sold to Italian businessmen Patrizio Cantù and Gabriele Raffanelli, and from the Italian Grand Prix, the JH25B was replaced by the JH27. The new chassis was considered worse than the JH25B, and three races later, AGS closed down.

== Complete Formula One results ==
Year	Entrant	Chassis	Engine	Tyres	Drivers	1	2	3	4	5	6	7	8	9	10	11	12	13	14	15	16	Points	WCC
1991	(France) Automobiles Gonfaronnaises Sportives	JH25B	Ford Cosworth DFR 3.5 V8	G		USA	BRA	SMR	MON	CAN	MEX	FRA	GBR	GER	HUN	BEL	ITA	POR	ESP	JPN	AUS	0	15th
1991	(France) Automobiles Gonfaronnaises Sportives	JH25B	Ford Cosworth DFR 3.5 V8	G	(Italy) Gabriele Tarquini	8	Ret	DNQ	Ret	DNQ	DNQ	DNQ	DNQ	DNQ	DNPQ	DNPQ						0	15th
1991	(France) Automobiles Gonfaronnaises Sportives	JH25B	Ford Cosworth DFR 3.5 V8	G	(Italy) Fabrizio Barbazza			DNQ	DNQ	DNQ	DNQ	DNQ	DNQ	DNPQ	DNPQ	DNPQ	DNPQ					0	15th
1991	(France) Automobiles Gonfaronnaises Sportives	JH25B	Ford Cosworth DFR 3.5 V8	G	(Sweden) Stefan Johansson	DNQ	DNQ															0	15th
