= 1993 Monaco Grand Prix =

Coordinates: 43°44′4.74″N 7°25′16.8″E

- Race 6 of 16 in the 1993 Formula One World Championship
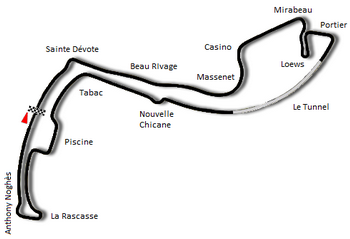

Race details
- Date: 23 May 1993
- Official name: 51e Grand Prix de Monaco
- Location: Circuit de Monaco, Monte Carlo
- Course: Temporary street circuit
- Course length: 3.328 km (2.068 miles)
- Distance: 78 laps, 259.584 km (161.298 miles)
- Weather: Partly cloudy, mild, dry

Pole position
Driver	(France) Alain Prost	Williams-Renault
- Time: 1:20.557

Fastest lap
Driver	(France) Alain Prost	Williams-Renault
- Time: 1:23.604 on lap 74

Podium
First	(Brazil) Ayrton Senna	McLaren-Ford
Second	(United Kingdom) Damon Hill	Williams-Renault
Third	(France) Jean Alesi	Ferrari

The 1993 Monaco Grand Prix (formally the 51e Grand Prix de Monaco) was a Formula One motor race held at Monaco on 23 May 1993. It was the sixth race of the 1993 Formula One World Championship.

The 78-lap race was won by Brazilian driver Ayrton Senna, driving a McLaren-Ford. It was Senna's fifth consecutive Monaco win and sixth in all, breaking the record set by British driver Graham Hill in 1969. Hill's son Damon finished second in a Williams-Renault, with Frenchman Jean Alesi third in a Ferrari. Senna also equalled the all-time record for wins at a single F1 Grand Prix. This race would be the last time Senna would win in Monaco as well as the last time he would lead the World Drivers' Championship standings.

== Summary ==
Prost took pole ahead of Schumacher, Senna, Hill, Alesi and Patrese. Prost jumped the start with Berger getting ahead of Patrese. The order was: Prost, Schumacher, Senna, Hill, Alesi and Berger.

At St. Devote on the first lap as ever there was a scrap as Blundell's Ligier was forced wide off the track and eventually retired after spinning into the wall with suspension damage. Then Prost was penalised for the jump start with a stop-go penalty. He went on lap 12 but stalled the car as he was trying to exit. Finally the problem was fixed but he was a lap down and in 22nd. Wendlinger in the Sauber made contact with JJ Lehto and eventually Lehto retired in the pits by lap 24 with collision damage. Schumacher, now leading, pulled away as Alesi waved through teammate Berger. Schumacher, comfortably ahead, suddenly slowed down with a hydraulic problem on lap 33 and retired in a cloud of smoke at Loews. The main entertainment was provided by Prost as he climbed up the field despite difficult overtaking at the Monaco street circuit.

It was time for the stops with no changes in the top 6 but Prost was the big gainer as he climbed from 10th to 7th. This became 6th and into the points when Patrese's engine failed on lap 54. Prost passed Fittipaldi for fifth soon after. Herbert crashed out on the main straight with gearbox problems on lap 62 which he subsequently had for 20 laps. On lap 71, Berger attacked Hill and there was contact. Hill rejoined but Berger was out immediately. Senna won from Hill, Alesi, Prost, Fittipaldi and Brundle.

== Classification ==
=== Qualifying ===
Pos	No	Driver	Constructor	Q1	Q2	Gap
1	2	(France) Alain Prost	Williams-Renault	1:39.649	1:20.557	
2	5	(Germany) Michael Schumacher	Benetton-Ford	1:40.780	1:21.190	+0.633
3	8	(Brazil) Ayrton Senna	McLaren-Ford	1:42.127	1:21.552	+0.995
4	0	(United Kingdom) Damon Hill	Williams-Renault	1:38.963	1:21.825	+1.268
5	27	(France) Jean Alesi	Ferrari	1:42.160	1:21.948	+1.391
6	6	(Italy) Riccardo Patrese	Benetton-Ford	1:42.136	1:22.117	+1.560
7	28	(Austria) Gerhard Berger	Ferrari	1:40.853	1:22.394	+1.837
8	29	(Austria) Karl Wendlinger	Sauber	1:45.439	1:22.477	+1.920
9	7	(United States) Michael Andretti	McLaren-Ford	1:45.993	1:22.994	+2.437
10	20	(France) Érik Comas	Larrousse-Lamborghini	1:44.483	1:23.246	+2.689
11	30	(Finland) JJ Lehto	Sauber	1:48.526	1:23.715	+3.158
12	9	(United Kingdom) Derek Warwick	Footwork-Mugen-Honda	1:44.884	1:23.749	+3.192
13	25	(United Kingdom) Martin Brundle	Ligier-Renault	1:46.446	1:23.786	+3.229
14	12	(United Kingdom) Johnny Herbert	Lotus-Ford	1:43.898	1:23.812	+3.255
15	19	(France) Philippe Alliot	Larrousse-Lamborghini	1:43.031	1:23.907	+3.350
16	14	(Brazil) Rubens Barrichello	Jordan-Hart	1:44.310	1:24.086	+3.529
17	23	(Brazil) Christian Fittipaldi	Minardi-Ford	1:43.829	1:24.298	+3.741
18	10	(Japan) Aguri Suzuki	Footwork-Mugen-Honda	10:06.384	1:24.524	+3.967
19	4	(Italy) Andrea de Cesaris	Tyrrell-Yamaha	1:44.193	1:24.544	+3.987
20	11	(Italy) Alessandro Zanardi	Lotus-Ford	1:46.935	1:24.888	+4.331
21	26	(United Kingdom) Mark Blundell	Ligier-Renault	1:43.449	1:24.972	+4.415
22	3	(Japan) Ukyo Katayama	Tyrrell-Yamaha	1:49.210	1:25.236	+4.679
23	15	(Belgium) Thierry Boutsen	Jordan-Hart	1:45.512	1:25.267	+4.710
24	21	(Italy) Michele Alboreto	Lola-Ferrari	1:47.082	1:26.444	+5.887
25	24	(Italy) Fabrizio Barbazza	Minardi-Ford	1:44.524	1:26.582	+6.025
DNQ	22	(Italy) Luca Badoer	Lola-Ferrari	1:46.745	1:29.613	+9.056

=== Race ===
Pos	No	Driver	Constructor	Laps	Time/Retired	Grid	Points
1	8	(Brazil) Ayrton Senna	McLaren-Ford	78	1:52:10.947	3	10
2	0	(United Kingdom) Damon Hill	Williams-Renault	78	+ 52.118	4	6
3	27	(France) Jean Alesi	Ferrari	78	+ 1:03.362	5	4
4	2	(France) Alain Prost	Williams-Renault	77	+ 1 lap	1	3
5	23	(Brazil) Christian Fittipaldi	Minardi-Ford	76	+ 2 laps	17	2
6	25	(United Kingdom) Martin Brundle	Ligier-Renault	76	+ 2 laps	13	1
7	11	(Italy) Alessandro Zanardi	Lotus-Ford	76	+ 2 laps	20	
8	7	(United States) Michael Andretti	McLaren-Ford	76	+ 2 laps	9	
9	14	(Brazil) Rubens Barrichello	Jordan-Hart	76	+ 2 laps	16	
10	4	(Italy) Andrea de Cesaris	Tyrrell-Yamaha	76	+ 2 laps	19	
11	24	(Italy) Fabrizio Barbazza	Minardi-Ford	75	+ 3 laps	25	
12	19	(France) Philippe Alliot	Larrousse-Lamborghini	75	+ 3 laps	15	
13	29	(Austria) Karl Wendlinger	Sauber	74	+ 4 laps	8	
14	28	(Austria) Gerhard Berger	Ferrari	70	Collision	7	
Ret	12	(United Kingdom) Johnny Herbert	Lotus-Ford	61	Gearbox/accident	14	
Ret	6	(Italy) Riccardo Patrese	Benetton-Ford	53	Engine	6	
Ret	20	(France) Érik Comas	Larrousse-Lamborghini	51	Engine	10	
Ret	10	(Japan) Aguri Suzuki	Footwork-Mugen-Honda	46	Spun off	18	
Ret	9	(United Kingdom) Derek Warwick	Footwork-Mugen-Honda	43	Throttle	12	
Ret	5	(Germany) Michael Schumacher	Benetton-Ford	32	Hydraulics	2	
Ret	3	(Japan) Ukyo Katayama	Tyrrell-Yamaha	31	Engine	22	
Ret	21	(Italy) Michele Alboreto	Lola-Ferrari	28	Gearbox	24	
Ret	30	(Finland) JJ Lehto	Sauber	23	Collision damage	11	
Ret	15	(Belgium) Thierry Boutsen	Jordan-Hart	12	Suspension	23	
Ret	26	(United Kingdom) Mark Blundell	Ligier-Renault	3	Spun off	21	

== Championship standings after the race ==
Drivers' Championship standings

	Pos	Driver	Points
1	1	(Brazil) Ayrton Senna	42
1	2	(France) Alain Prost	37
1	3	(United Kingdom) Damon Hill	18
1	4	(Germany) Michael Schumacher	14
	5	(United Kingdom) Mark Blundell	6

Constructors' Championship standings

Pos	Constructor	Points
1	(United Kingdom) Williams-Renault	55
2	(United Kingdom) McLaren-Ford	44
3	(United Kingdom) Benetton-Ford	19
4	(France) Ligier-Renault	11
5	(United Kingdom) Lotus-Ford	7

- Note: Only the top five positions are included for both sets of standings.

Previous race: 1993 Spanish Grand Prix	FIA Formula One World Championship; 1993 season	Next race: 1993 Canadian Grand Prix
Previous race: 1992 Monaco Grand Prix	Monaco Grand Prix	Next race: 1994 Monaco Grand Prix
