= 1993 Canadian Grand Prix =

- Race 7 of 16 in the 1993 Formula One World Championship

Race details
- Date: 13 June 1993
- Location: Circuit Gilles Villeneuve; Montreal, Quebec, Canada
- Course: Temporary street circuit
- Course length: 4.430 km (2.753 miles)
- Distance: 69 laps, 305.670 km (189.935 miles)
- Weather: Temperatures reaching up to 29.0 °C (84.2 °F); Wind speeds up to 18.3 km/h (11.4 mph)

Pole position
Driver	(France) Alain Prost	Williams-Renault
- Time: 1:18.987

Fastest lap
Driver	(Germany) Michael Schumacher	Benetton-Ford
- Time: 1:21.500 on lap 57 (lap record)

Podium
First	(France) Alain Prost	Williams-Renault
Second	(Germany) Michael Schumacher	Benetton-Ford
Third	(United Kingdom) Damon Hill	Williams-Renault

The 1993 Canadian Grand Prix was a Formula One motor race held at the Circuit Gilles Villeneuve in Montreal, Quebec, Canada on 13 June 1993. It was the seventh race of the 1993 Formula One World Championship. The 69-lap race was won from pole position by Alain Prost, driving a Williams-Renault, with Michael Schumacher second in a Benetton-Ford and Prost's teammate Damon Hill third. This was the last Formula One race to feature BBC commentary from James Hunt before his death aged 45. He was replaced by Jonathan Palmer partnering Murray Walker.

== Report ==
=== Qualifying ===
There was a two by two formation in qualifying in Canada as the Williams were ahead of the Benettons and the Ferraris. Prost took pole ahead of Hill, Schumacher, Patrese, Berger and Alesi. Uncharacteristically, Senna was down in 8th.

=== Race ===
At the start, Hill beat Prost away, while the Benettons were slow and were passed by Berger and Senna (who had already got ahead of Brundle and then Alesi). Hill was leading Prost, Berger, Senna, Schumacher and Patrese.

Senna passed Berger for third on lap 2. On lap 6, Prost took the lead from Hill. Soon afterwards, Schumacher passed Berger with Patrese following him through five laps later. The order stabilised at: Prost, Hill, Senna, Schumacher, Patrese and Berger.

During the mid-race stops, Hill had a problem and dropped behind Senna and Schumacher. Schumacher now set off after Senna. Senna's alternator eventually gave out and he retired from the race. Prost won ahead of Schumacher, Hill, Berger, Brundle and Wendlinger.

== Classification ==
=== Qualifying ===
Pos	No	Driver	Constructor	Q1	Q2	Gap
1	2	(France) Alain Prost	Williams-Renault	1:18.987	1:19.135	
2	0	(United Kingdom) Damon Hill	Williams-Renault	1:19.491	1:20.145	+0.504
3	5	(Germany) Michael Schumacher	Benetton-Ford	1:20.808	1:20.945	+1.821
4	6	(Italy) Riccardo Patrese	Benetton-Ford	1:20.948	1:23.268	+1.961
5	28	(Austria) Gerhard Berger	Ferrari	1:21.278	1:21.513	+2.291
6	27	(France) Jean Alesi	Ferrari	1:21.414	1:21.660	+2.427
7	25	(United Kingdom) Martin Brundle	Ligier-Renault	1:21.603	1:22.026	+2.616
8	8	(Brazil) Ayrton Senna	McLaren-Ford	1:21.706	1:21.891	+2.719
9	29	(Austria) Karl Wendlinger	Sauber	1:21.936	1:21.813	+2.826
10	26	(United Kingdom) Mark Blundell	Ligier-Renault	1:22.097	1:22.622	+3.110
11	30	(Finland) JJ Lehto	Sauber	1:22.198	1:22.428	+3.211
12	7	(United States) Michael Andretti	McLaren-Ford	1:22.751	1:22.229	+3.242
13	20	(France) Érik Comas	Larrousse-Lamborghini	1:22.263	1:22.977	+3.276
14	14	(Brazil) Rubens Barrichello	Jordan-Hart	1:23.152	1:22.509	+3.522
15	19	(France) Philippe Alliot	Larrousse-Lamborghini	1:22.983	1:22.819	+3.832
16	10	(Japan) Aguri Suzuki	Footwork-Mugen-Honda	1:22.891	1:22.999	+3.904
17	23	(Brazil) Christian Fittipaldi	Minardi-Ford	1:24.559	1:23.119	+4.132
18	9	(United Kingdom) Derek Warwick	Footwork-Mugen-Honda	1:23.518	1:23.185	+4.198
19	4	(Italy) Andrea de Cesaris	Tyrrell-Yamaha	1:23.268	1:23.185	+4.198
20	12	(United Kingdom) Johnny Herbert	Lotus-Ford	1:23.341	1:23.223	+4.236
21	11	(Italy) Alessandro Zanardi	Lotus-Ford	1:23.240	1:25.027	+4.253
22	3	(Japan) Ukyo Katayama	Tyrrell-Yamaha	1:24.391	1:23.824	+4.837
23	24	(Italy) Fabrizio Barbazza	Minardi-Ford	1:23.946	1:24.375	+4.959
24	15	(Belgium) Thierry Boutsen	Jordan-Hart	1:24.632	1:23.960	+4.973
25	22	(Italy) Luca Badoer	Lola-Ferrari	1:25.212	1:24.357	+5.370
DNQ	21	(Italy) Michele Alboreto	Lola-Ferrari	1:24.382	1:24.391	+5.395

=== Race ===
Pos	No	Driver	Constructor	Laps	Time/Retired	Grid	Points
1	2	(France) Alain Prost	Williams-Renault	69	1:36:41.822	1	10
2	5	(Germany) Michael Schumacher	Benetton-Ford	69	+ 14.527	3	6
3	0	(United Kingdom) Damon Hill	Williams-Renault	69	+ 52.685	2	4
4	28	(Austria) Gerhard Berger	Ferrari	68	+ 1 Lap	5	3
5	25	(United Kingdom) Martin Brundle	Ligier-Renault	68	+ 1 Lap	7	2
6	29	(Austria) Karl Wendlinger	Sauber	68	+ 1 Lap	9	1
7	30	(Finland) JJ Lehto	Sauber	68	+ 1 Lap	11	
8	20	(France) Érik Comas	Larrousse-Lamborghini	68	+ 1 Lap	13	
9	23	(Brazil) Christian Fittipaldi	Minardi-Ford	67	+ 2 Laps	17	
10	12	(United Kingdom) Johnny Herbert	Lotus-Ford	67	+ 2 Laps	20	
11	11	(Italy) Alessandro Zanardi	Lotus-Ford	67	+ 2 Laps	21	
12	15	(Belgium) Thierry Boutsen	Jordan-Hart	67	+ 2 Laps	24	
13	10	(Japan) Aguri Suzuki	Footwork-Mugen-Honda	66	+ 3 Laps	16	
14	7	(United States) Michael Andretti	McLaren-Ford	66	+ 3 Laps	12	
15	22	(Italy) Luca Badoer	Lola-Ferrari	65	+ 4 Laps	25	
16	9	(United Kingdom) Derek Warwick	Footwork-Mugen-Honda	65	+ 4 Laps	18	
17	3	(Japan) Ukyo Katayama	Tyrrell-Yamaha	64	+ 5 Laps	22	
18	8	(Brazil) Ayrton Senna	McLaren-Ford	62	Electrical	8	
Ret	6	(Italy) Riccardo Patrese	Benetton-Ford	52	Physical	4	
Ret	4	(Italy) Andrea de Cesaris	Tyrrell-Yamaha	45	Spun off	19	
Ret	24	(Italy) Fabrizio Barbazza	Minardi-Ford	33	Gearbox	23	
Ret	27	(France) Jean Alesi	Ferrari	23	Engine	6	
Ret	26	(United Kingdom) Mark Blundell	Ligier-Renault	13	Spun off	10	
Ret	14	(Brazil) Rubens Barrichello	Jordan-Hart	10	Electrical	14	
Ret	19	(France) Philippe Alliot	Larrousse-Lamborghini	8	Engine	15	

== Championship standings after the race ==
Drivers' Championship standings

	Pos	Driver	Points
1	1	(France) Alain Prost	47
1	2	(Brazil) Ayrton Senna	42
	3	(United Kingdom) Damon Hill	22
	4	(Germany) Michael Schumacher	20
3	5	(United Kingdom) Martin Brundle	7

Constructors' Championship standings

	Pos	Constructor	Points
	1	(United Kingdom) Williams-Renault	69
	2	(United Kingdom) McLaren-Ford	44
	3	(United Kingdom) Benetton-Ford	25
	4	(France) Ligier-Renault	13
2	5	(Italy) Ferrari	9

- Note: Only the top five positions are included for both sets of standings.

Previous race: 1993 Monaco Grand Prix	FIA Formula One World Championship; 1993 season	Next race: 1993 French Grand Prix
Previous race: 1992 Canadian Grand Prix	Canadian Grand Prix	Next race: 1994 Canadian Grand Prix
