= Luca Badoer =

Italian racing driver (born 1971)

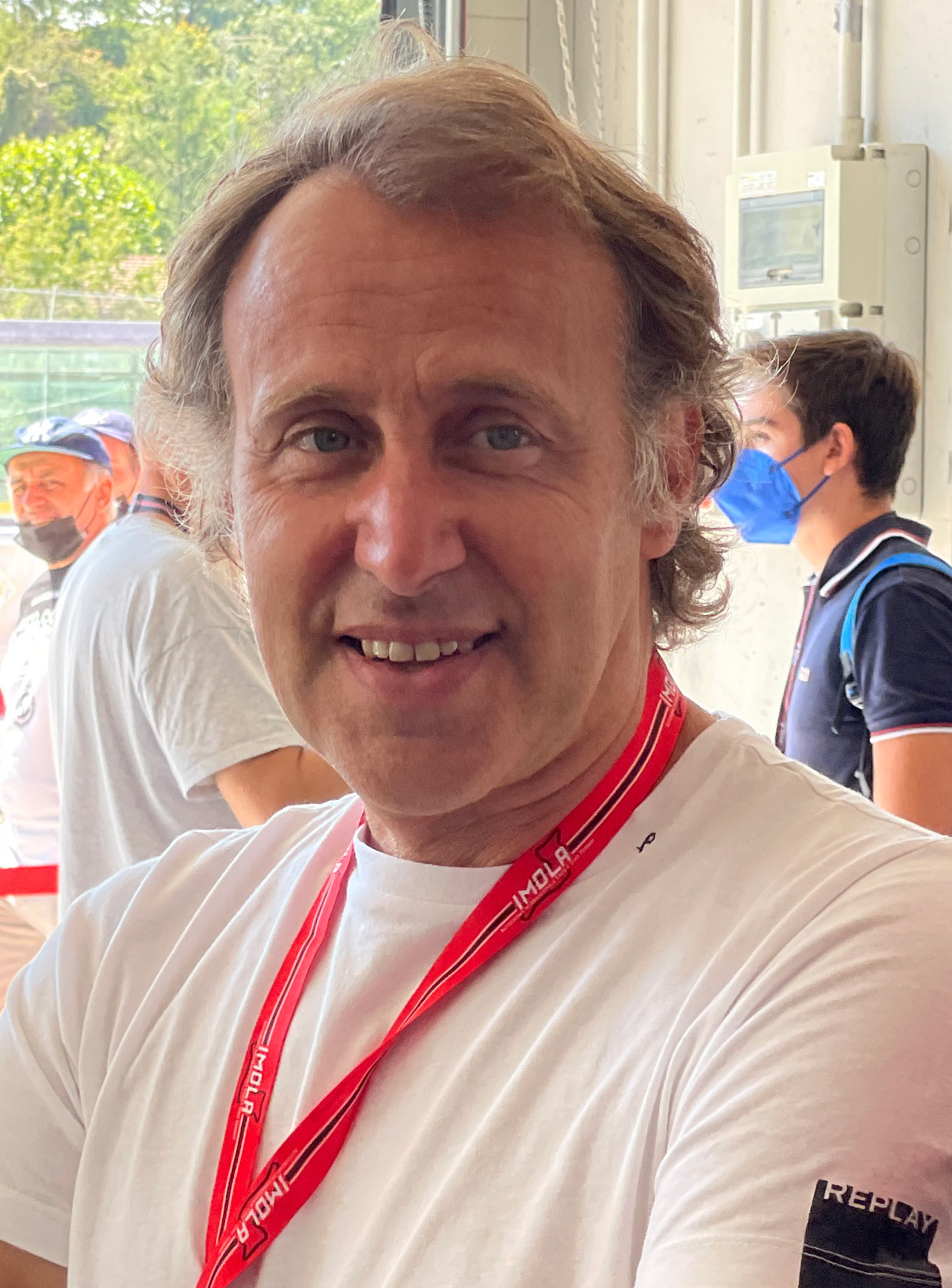
- Badoer in 2021
- Born: 25 January 1971 (age 55); Montebelluna, Veneto, Italy
- Spouse: Alice Terzi
- Children: 2, including Brando

Formula One World Championship career
- Nationality: (Italy) Italian
- Active years: 1993, 1995–1996, 1999, 2009
- Team(s): Scuderia Italia, Minardi, Forti, Ferrari
- Entries: 58 (50 starts)
- Championships: 0
- Wins: 0
- Podiums: 0
- Career points: 0
- Pole positions: 0
- Fastest laps: 0
- First entry: 1993 South African Grand Prix
- Last entry: 2009 Belgian Grand Prix

Luca Badoer (Italian pronunciation: [ˈluːka baˈdɔɛr]; born 25 January 1971) is an Italian former racing driver, who competed in Formula One between 1993 and 2009. (Note: The exact years Badoer competed in Formula One: 1993, 1995–1996, 1999, 2009.)

Born and raised in Veneto, Badoer began competitive kart racing at a young age, winning several regional and national titles. Progressing to Formula 3000 in 1992, he won the title at the first attempt. Between 1993 and 1999, Badoer competed in Formula One at 56 Grands Prix for Scuderia Italia, Minardi and Forti. In addition to his racing duties, Badoer was one of the active test drivers for Ferrari from 1998 to 2010; in 2009, he deputised for Felipe Massa at the European and Belgian Grands Prix.

Badoer holds the record for the most starts without scoring a point (50), although all of his races before his 2009 comeback came during a period when only the top six finishers scored points. Under the 2010 scoring system, he would have scored 26 points over his career. He nearly achieved a points finish in the 1999 European Grand Prix, when the gearbox on his Minardi M01 failed whilst running in fourth.

== Early career ==
Badoer was born in Montebelluna, Veneto, Italy. He raced karts in his youth starting in 1985 and scored two wins. In 1986, Badoer drove in the 100cc category to become the karting champion of Venice and became national champion the following year. He won the Italian championship in the 100cc international class in 1988.

=== Formula Three and Formula 3000 ===
In 1989, Badoer moved to single-seater racing, joining the Trivellato team in the Italian Formula Three Championship driving a Dallara/Alfa Romeo. In 1990, he moved to the MRD Team. Driving a Ralt RT33 Alfa Romeo, he defeated Alex Zanardi and Roberto Colciago to win the final race of the 1990 season and finished 10th in the championship. In 1991 he moved to the Supercars team driving a Dallara 391 Alfa Romeo to win four races in succession, but was disqualified after a technicality concerning his tyres. Badoer finished fourth overall in the championship taking 33 points. In 1992, Badoer graduated to the Formula 3000 Championship, where he was selected to drive for Crypton Engineering. Badoer won four races, including a dominating display at Pergusa where he finished 21 seconds ahead of Emanuele Naspetti. While beating a field that included Rubens Barrichello and David Coulthard, Badoer became one of only four drivers to win the Formula 3000 title at the first attempt (the others being Stefano Modena in 1987, Christian Fittipaldi in 1991 and Jörg Müller in 1996). winning four races en route to the title.

== Formula One ==
=== 1993 ===
Badoer had an offer of a long-term contract with Tyrrell to join the team, starting in the 1993 season. Badoer rejected this offer and signed with BMS Scuderia Italia instead.

Badoer's debut in Formula One in 1993 was mired by BMS Scuderia Italia's uncompetitive Lola chassis, which, despite Ferrari engines, was the slowest car in the championship in terms of qualifying pace. In South Africa, Badoer retired after 20 laps due to gearbox failure. In Brazil, Badoer qualified 21st and finished 12th after an incident forced him to pit for a new nose cone. At Donington, he fell victim to a new rule limiting qualifying to the fastest 24 cars (his time was only good enough for 26th). The round at Imola saw Badoer race as high as sixth, but finish seventh. This remained Badoer's best result in Formula One. In Spain, he was unable to finish and at Monaco, Badoer finished the last of the runners. He managed to finish 15th in Canada. At Magny-Cours, Silverstone, Hockenheim and Budapest, Badoer failed to finish, twice to suspension failure. Going into Spa, the Lola team was gaining reliability and Badoer finished 13th. At his home race at Monza he was ahead of Christian Fittipaldi and battled for several laps before the Brazilian hit Badoer's car and eventually finished tenth. At Estoril, Badoer finished 14th after starting last. After the race, Lola did not travel to the races in Japan and Australia after the team announced they were to merge with Minardi in 1994.

Benetton offered both Michele Alboreto and Badoer tests in their cars to see who would partner Michael Schumacher for 1994 but eventually chose JJ Lehto and Alboreto went to Minardi to line up alongside Pierluigi Martini while Badoer became Minardi's test driver.

=== 1995 ===
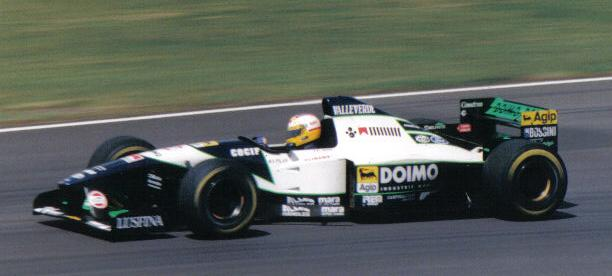
Badoer driving for Minardi at the 1995 British Grand Prix.

Badoer took over Alboreto's seat after the latter retired. In the underfunded team using a Ford V8 after a deal with Mugen-Honda fell through, he started with a gearbox failure in Brazil with a good qualifying in Argentina. During the race, Badoer collided with the back of Mika Salo's Tyrrell and hit Rubens Barichello's Jordan later on bringing out the red flag. Badoer did not make the restart, having no spare chassis. His best results were eighth places in Canada and Hungary and ninth in Japan.

=== 1996 ===
In 1996, Badoer switched to Forti Corse to be teammates with Andrea Montermini after Pedro Diniz left to join Ligier. During the season, he was only able to qualify for six of the ten races the team entered. In the 1996 Argentine Grand Prix Badoer was involved in a heavy collision with Diniz, whose Ligier struck him from behind and flipped his Forti upside down. He emerged from the collision unhurt but Argentine safety marshals were heavily criticised for failing to assist Badoer in a timely manner because they feared a fire would break out. At Imola, Badoer had a newer car and outqualified Montermini by more than a second. He finished tenth and the last of the runners. In Monaco, Badoer remained at the back and collided with Jacques Villeneuve at Mirabeau forcing both drivers to retire. He did not qualify in Spain but started 20th in Canada. In France, Badoer started ahead of Eddie Irvine after the Ferrari was relegated to the back. Forti Corse folded after that year's British Grand Prix.

== FIA GT Championship ==
In 1997, Badoer moved to the new FIA GT Championship, driving a Lotus Elise GT1 for GBF Engineering with co-driver Mimmo Schiattarella. Following retirements at Hockenheim and Silverstone, Badoer and Schiattarella finished 20th in Helsinki. The pair retired again at the Nurburgring and Zeltweg and finished 12th at Donington completing 151 laps. A race at Mugello saw Badoer retire with loose bodywork. While driving for GBF, Badoer was hired as Scuderia Ferrari's test driver, a role he maintained until 2010.

== Return to Formula One ==
=== Minardi (1999) ===
Badoer returned to Formula One racing in 1999, again with the Minardi team. At Melbourne, Badoer raced as high as fifth at some point until gearbox problems forced him to retire with 15 laps to go. Prior to Brazil, he suffered a testing accident which left him with a broken hand. Stéphane Sarrazin took his seat for the race. He returned for Imola with his hand still causing problems but managed to finish eighth. He suffered from gearbox problems and a spin in Monaco and Spain. In July, Ferrari's number one driver Michael Schumacher broke his leg in an accident at the British Grand Prix at Silverstone. As Ferrari's test driver, Badoer expected to be promoted to the race seat in Schumacher's absence, but the team opted for Mika Salo instead, prompting criticism from former Ferrari driver Jean Alesi, who had himself turned the position down. His best chance to score points came at the chaotic 1999 European Grand Prix, only for gearbox failure to take him out 13 laps from the end when he was running in fourth position; teammate Marc Gené was promoted to sixth as a result (he would finish there to score the point widely believed to be the deciding factor in the 1999 Drivers' Championship, holding off Ferrari's Eddie Irvine after McLaren's Mika Häkkinen had passed him following a car failure that took Jacques Villeneuve out from fifth position). Badoer was so upset he broke down in tears after climbing out of the car.

Badoer overall started 48 races for backmarkers Scuderia Italia, Minardi and Forti Corse between 1993 and 1999.

=== 2000s: Ferrari test driver ===
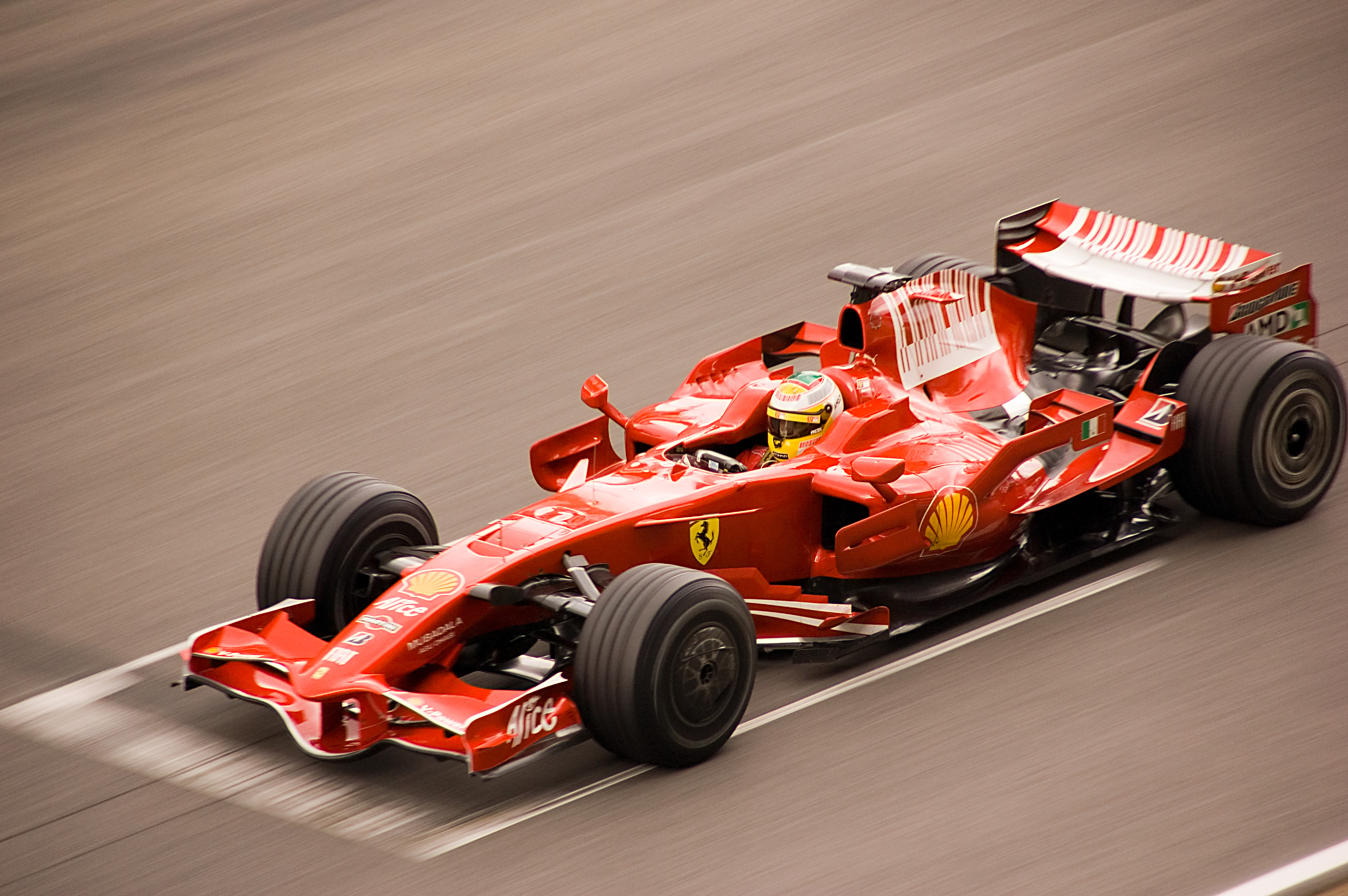
Badoer testing for Ferrari at the Circuit de Catalunya in 2008

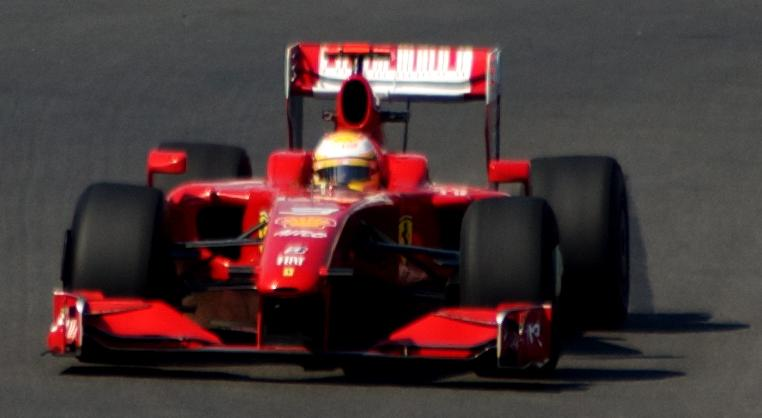
Badoer took part in his first Formula One race in ten years at the 2009 European Grand Prix.

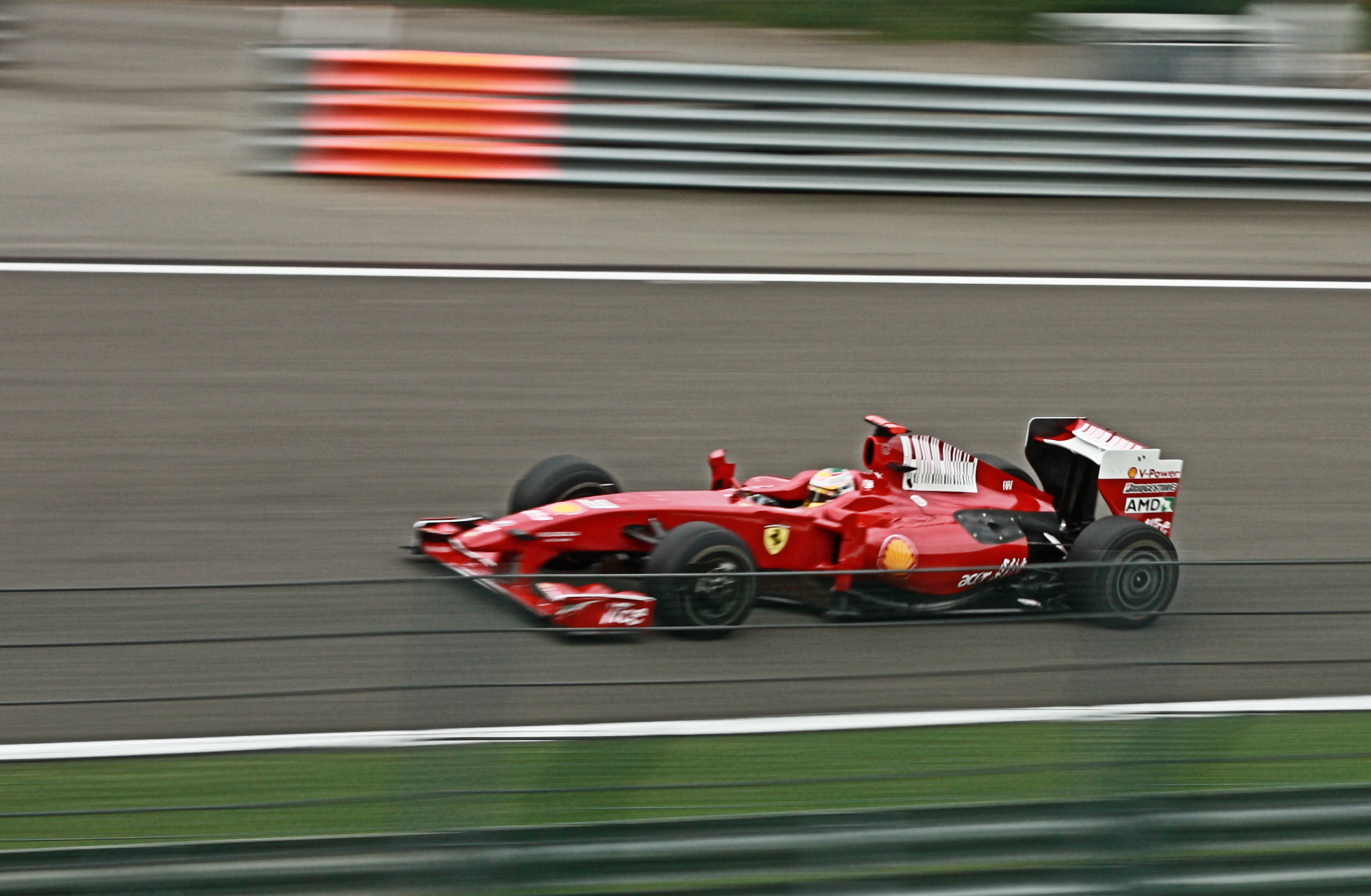
Badoer was dropped in favour of Giancarlo Fisichella after the 2009 Belgian Grand Prix.

Unable to find a satisfactory race seat in Formula One after 1999, Badoer focused on his job as the permanent test driver for Ferrari, covering thousands of kilometres at the Mugello and Fiorano test circuits each year. He is credited with making a vital contribution to Ferrari's first Formula One Drivers' Championship win for 21 years in 2000.

At the opening ceremony of the 2006 Winter Olympics in Turin, Badoer demonstrated one of the team's 2005 cars in the centre of the stadium. After the pit crew assembled the car, Badoer revved the engine, and performed several doughnuts, creating a large cloud of tyre smoke and leaving circular black marks on the white platform.

=== Ferrari (2009) ===
On 11 August 2009, it was confirmed that Badoer would return to Formula One racing after almost ten years, to replace the injured Felipe Massa at the 2009 European Grand Prix in Valencia. Massa was injured during the qualifying session for the 2009 Hungarian Grand Prix when a piece of suspension fell from the rear of Rubens Barrichello's Brawn GP car and struck Massa's helmet, fracturing his skull, knocking him unconscious and causing him to crash into a tyre wall. Michael Schumacher was set to replace Massa, but a neck injury Schumacher sustained in a German superbike test earlier in the year forced him to pull out. The BBC reported that Badoer was given the job as a "thank you for his commitment to the team". Badoer's ten-year gap between race entries is the second-longest in Formula 1.

In the first practice session for the 2009 European Grand Prix at the Valencia Street Circuit, where he had never driven before, Badoer came last and was three seconds off the pace of fastest man Rubens Barrichello and 2.5 seconds down on teammate Kimi Räikkönen. He was 1.3 seconds down on Räikkönen in second practice, and 1.9 seconds off in final practice. He qualified 20th and last for the race, with a time almost 1.5 seconds slower than Scuderia Toro Rosso driver Jaime Alguersuari, who was 19th. He was also caught speeding in the pit-lane four times during Friday practice. These offences earned him a reprimand and three separate fines totalling €5,400. Badoer explained: "I am used to a 100kph limit in testing and so when I pressed the speed limiter button at the usual point in the pitlane, it did not give the car enough time to slow to the right speed."

A number of drivers defended Badoer's performance. Lewis Hamilton said: "I think he's done a good job. He's not put it in the wall. He's kept it on the track. It's an incredibly tall order to jump into the footsteps of Felipe Massa. He hasn't even raced for ten years, so I think anyone who has taken that long out of the car is going to struggle, but instead I think he has done a good job just to keep it on the track and bit-by-bit he will catch up". Heikki Kovalainen stated, "I don't know what else you could have expected. Sometimes the tyres warm up, or they overheat or they don't warm up, and it's much more complicated than a few years ago where they brought out tyres that worked straightaway in different conditions. I think that knocks the driver's confidence very easily – if the tyres are not working 100 percent you can't push if you don't feel you have the grip".

BBC commentator and former F1 driver Martin Brundle argued in The Sunday Times that the inclusion of Badoer and Romain Grosjean in the race was dangerous, since new rules that ban further testing until 1 January 2010 mean that they have been unable to gain the experience necessary to race. Badoer had never driven the Ferrari F60 before, having last tested the Ferrari F2008 at the Autódromo Internacional do Algarve in Portimão, Portugal in December 2008. Elsewhere, Brundle stated: "It is surprising to some that Ferrari has not elected to use fellow tester Marc Gené who once stood in pretty successfully at Williams. The problem is that, with the testing ban for 2009, none of the test drivers are really up to speed. I personally would have tried a sharp and fit up-and-coming star of which there are many around". During his race commentary, Brundle suggested that Ferrari should use Massa's absence to give a potential future star a drive.

In racing at Valencia, Badoer became the first Italian to drive for Ferrari in 15 years. Badoer made up six places at the start of the race and ran 14th on the first lap before he was hit from behind by Grosjean and spun. He eventually finished in 17th place out of 18 finishers, posting a fastest lap which was faster than both Toro Rossos. Ferrari team principal Stefano Domenicali indicated after the race that Badoer would keep the seat for the Belgian Grand Prix.

At the Belgian Grand Prix, Badoer again qualified last after a spin on his last lap of the first qualifying session. At the start of the race, Badoer avoided the accidents on the first lap and finished in 14th place, last of those drivers to finish the full race distance, despite setting the fastest sector one time of the race. Badoer was replaced by Force India driver Giancarlo Fisichella starting at the Italian Grand Prix, although over the five remaining races of the season he also failed to score any points. Badoer blamed the negative media coverage of his driving for Ferrari's decision to replace him.

== Retirement ==
At the end of 2010, Badoer retired from Ferrari as test driver and was replaced by Jules Bianchi. He ended his 12-year role at Ferrari with a demonstration of the Ferrari F60, the car Badoer raced in 2009 on a Ferrari-themed day at the Bologna Motor Show on 8 December 2010. He also took part in a forum for Gazzetta dello Sport, where he stated his only regret was that he "was only able to do two races [for the Scuderia]". In January 2011, Badoer drove the Ferrari F60 with a special livery on the ice of the Madonna di Campiglio for his final act with the team.

== Personal life ==
Badoer is married and has two children - Rocco and Brando. In 2017, Brando debuted in the WSK karting series, and in December 2023 Brando finished 6th in the Italian F4 Championship driving for Van Amersfoort Racing. Brando was a member of the McLaren Driver Development Programme until 2025.

== Racing record ==
=== Complete International Formula 3000 results ===
(key) (Races in bold indicate pole position) (Races in italics indicate fastest lap)

Year	Entrant	Chassis	Engine	1	2	3	4	5	6	7	8	9	10	DC	Points
1992	Crypton Engineering	Reynard/92D	Ford Cosworth	SIL; 5	PAU; 6	CAT; 6	**PER**; 1	**HOC**; 1	NÜR; 1	SPA; Ret	**ALB**; 2	**NOG**; 1	**MAG**; Ret	**1st**	**46**

=== Complete Formula One results ===
(key)

Year	Entrant	Chassis	Engine	1	2	3	4	5	6	7	8	9	10	11	12	13	14	15	16	17	WDC	Points
1993	Lola BMS Scuderia Italia	Lola T93/30	Ferrari 040 3.5 V12	RSA; Ret	BRA; 12	EUR; DNQ	SMR; 7	ESP; Ret	MON; DNQ	CAN; 15	FRA; Ret	GBR; Ret	GER; Ret	HUN; Ret	BEL; 13	ITA; 10	POR; 14	JPN	AUS		25th	0
1995	Minardi Scuderia Italia	Minardi M195	Ford EDM 3.0 V8	BRA; Ret	ARG; DNS	SMR; 14	ESP; Ret	MON; Ret	CAN; 8	FRA; 13	GBR; 10	GER; Ret	HUN; 8	BEL; Ret	ITA; Ret	POR; 14	EUR; 11	PAC; 15	JPN; 9	AUS; DNS	23rd	0
1996	Forti Grand Prix	Forti FG01B	Ford ECA Zetec-R 3.0 V8	AUS; DNQ	BRA; 11	ARG; Ret	EUR; DNQ														21st	0
1996	Forti Grand Prix	Forti FG03	Ford ECA Zetec-R 3.0 V8					SMR; 10	MON; Ret	ESP; DNQ	CAN; Ret	FRA; Ret	GBR; DNQ	GER	HUN	BEL	ITA	POR	JPN		21st	0
1999	Fondmetal Minardi Ford	Minardi M01	Ford VJM1/VJM2 Zetec-R 3.0 V10	AUS; Ret	BRA	SMR; 8	MON; Ret	ESP; Ret	CAN; 10	FRA; 10	GBR; Ret	AUT; 13	GER; 10	HUN; 14	BEL; Ret	ITA; Ret	EUR; Ret	MAL; Ret	JPN; Ret		23rd	0
2009	Scuderia Ferrari Marlboro	Ferrari F60	Ferrari 056 2.4 V8	AUS	MAL	CHN	BHR	ESP	MON	TUR	GBR	GER	HUN	EUR; 17	BEL; 14	ITA	SIN	JPN	BRA	ABU	25th	0

=== Complete FIA GT Championship results ===
(key)

Year	Team	Class	Car	Engine	1	2	3	4	5	6	7	8	9	10	11	Pos.	Points
1997	GBF UK Ltd.	GT1	Lotus GT1	Lotus Type-918 3.5 L Turbo V8	HOC; Ret	SIL; Ret	HEL; 13	NÜR; Ret	SPA	A1R; Ret	SUZ	DON; 12	MUG; Ret	SEB	LAG	NC	0

== Notes ==
Sporting positions
Preceded by Christian Fittipaldi	International Formula 3000; Champion; 1992	Succeeded by Olivier Panis
Preceded by Rubens Barrichello (1993)	Formula One Indoor Trophy; Winner; 1995	Succeeded by Giancarlo Fisichella
