= Fabrizio Barbazza =

Italian racing driver (born 1963)

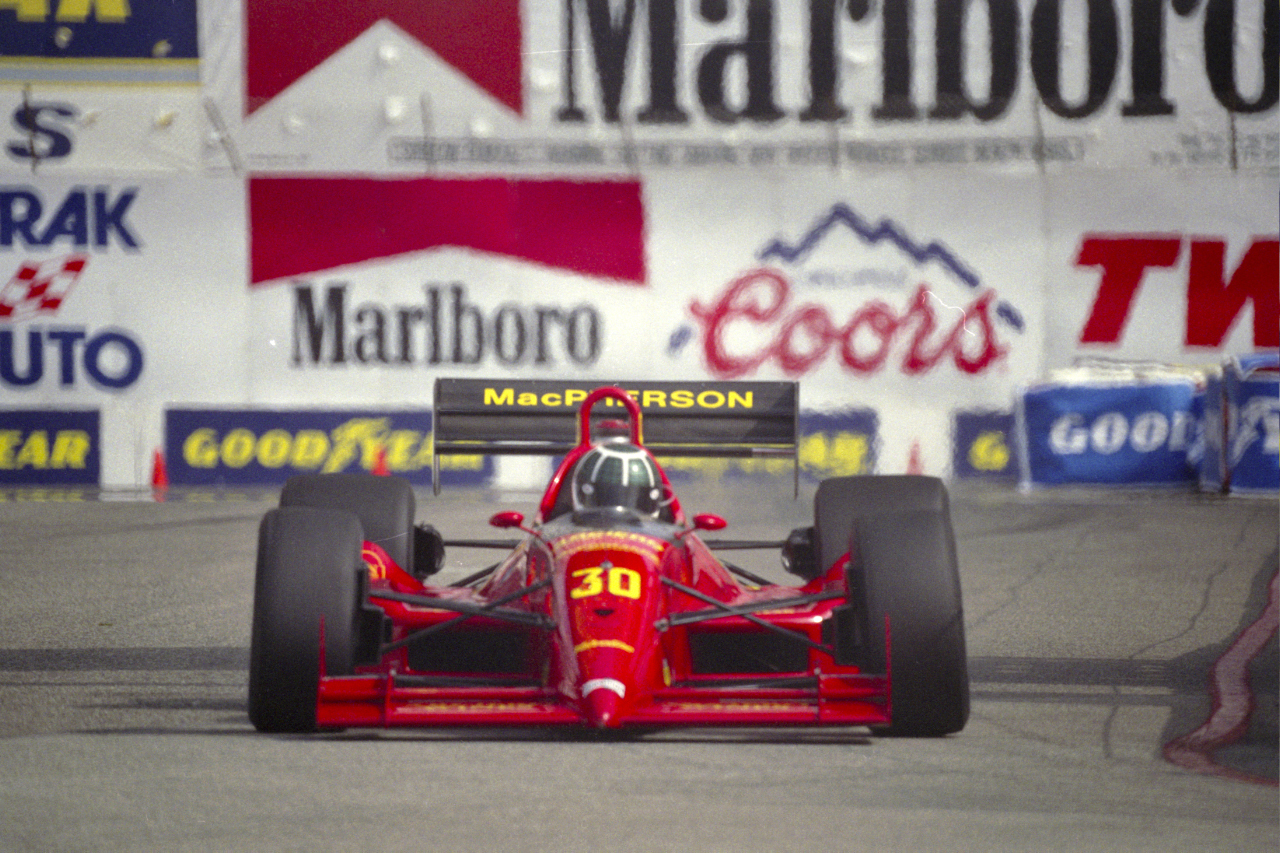
- Barbazza at the 1992 Long Beach Grand Prix
- Born: 2 April 1963 (age 63); Monza, Lombardy, Italy

Formula One World Championship career
- Nationality: (Italy) Italian
- Active years: 1991, 1993
- Team(s): AGS, Minardi
- Entries: 20 (8 starts)
- Championships: 0
- Wins: 0
- Podiums: 0
- Career points: 2
- Pole positions: 0
- Fastest laps: 0
- First entry: 1991 San Marino Grand Prix
- Last entry: 1993 French Grand Prix

CART Championship Car
- Years active: 1987, 1989, 1992
- Teams: Arciero Racing
- Starts: 25
- Wins: 0
- Poles: 0
- Best finish: 12th in 1987

Previous series
- 1986 1983-1985 1982: American Racing Series; Italian Formula Three; Formula Monza

Championship titles
- 1986: Indy Lights

Awards
- 1987 1987: CART Rookie of the year Indianapolis 500 Rookie of the year

Fabrizio Barbazza (born 2 April 1963) is an Italian former Formula One driver who raced for the AGS and Minardi teams and was the 1987 Indianapolis 500 Rookie of the Year.

== Career ==
=== Early career ===
Barbazza was born in Monza, Lombardy. After a career in motocross in his teens, he began racing Formula Monza in 1982. The following year, he moved into Italian Formula Three Championship and, in 1984, finished sixth in the series. In 1985, he won four races and finished third in the championship. He then went to the United States and entered the American Racing Series, where he won five races and the title in his first attempt.

=== CART, F3000, and Formula One ===
After his success in ARS, Barbazza entered CART in 1987 and finished third in the 1987 Indianapolis 500, becoming CART's Rookie of the Year. Despite his success he could not find a ride in CART for 1988 and only made two starts in Formula 3000, along with failing to qualify three times. He returned to CART for 1989 for eight races with a best finish of eighth at Toronto. He also drove in eight Japanese Formula 3000 races.

In 1990, Barbazza joined International F3000 full-time driving for the Crypton team, finishing 16th in points with a best finish of fourth at his home track in Monza, his only point-scoring finish of the season. For 1991 Barbazza signed on with the struggling AGS Formula One team for the third round of the championship, replacing Stefan Johansson. Barbazza failed to qualify for all twelve races he attempted with the team and the team shut down after both Barbazza and his teammate Olivier Grouillard both failed to pre-qualify for the 1991 Spanish Grand Prix. For the 1992 racing season, Barbazza again returned to the Arciero team in CART. However, after respectable performances in two-year-old equipment for the first three races of the season, he wrecked his 1990-vintage Lola in practice for the 1992 Indianapolis 500 and was not able to qualify. It would be his last appearance in CART. In 1993, Barbazza rejoined Formula One with the Minardi team, scoring points twice in his first four races. However, Barbazza would be replaced by Pierluigi Martini after eight races. In 1995, while racing a Ferrari 333SP sports prototype at the Road Atlanta circuit, he was involved in a major accident with Jeremy Dale, which resulted in heavy head and chest injuries which left him in critical condition, in a coma and on artificial respiration. Although he fully recovered, he did not return to racing. Instead he started a go-kart circuit in Monza and began designing crash barriers.

Barbazza has since relocated to Cuba where he has set up a fishing resort in the north of the country called La Villa Clara. He has also raced again, at a local karting track in Cuba, where he has re-discovered his love for the sport.

== Career summary ==
=== American open wheel racing ===
==== Indy Lights ====
(key)

Year	Team	Series	1	2	3	4	5	6	7	8	9	10	11	Rank	Points	Ref
1986	**Arciero Racing**	**ARS**	LBH; DNS	PHX; 3	MIL; DNS	MEA; 1	CLE; 1	TOR; 10	POC; 2	MDO; 7	NAZ; 1	LS; 1	MIA; 1	**1st**	**145**	

==== CART ====
Year	Team	No.	1	2	3	4	5	6	7	8	9	10	11	12	13	14	15	16	Rank	Points	Ref
1987	Arciero Racing	12	LBH; 17	PHX; 12	INDY; 3	MIL; 14	POR; 4	MEA; 16	CLE; 24	TOR; 11	MIS; 6	POC; 14	ROA; 8	MDO; 24	NAZ; 13	LS; DNS	MIA; 28		**12th**	**42**	
1989	Arciero Racing	12	PHX	LBH	INDY	MIL	DET; 20	POR; 21	CLE; 26	MEA; 24	TOR; 8	MIS	POC	MDO; 20	ROA; 12	NAZ	LS; 21		**24th**	**6**	
1992	Arciero Racing	30	SRF; 12	PHX; 20	LBH; 21	INDY; DNQ	DET	POR	MIL	NHM	TOR	MIS	CLE	ROA	VAN	MDO	NAZ	LS	**35th**	**1**	

==== Indy 500 results ====
Year	Chassis	Engine	Start	Finish
1987	March	Cosworth	17	3
1992	Lola	Buick	DNQ	

=== Complete International Formula 3000 results ===
(key) (Races in bold indicate pole position) (Races in italics indicate fastest lap)

Year	Entrant	1	2	3	4	5	6	7	8	9	10	11	DC	Points
1988	Pavesi Racing	JER	VAL; DNQ	PAU; DNQ	SIL; 18								NC	0
1988	Genoa Racing					MNZ; Ret	PER; DNQ	BRH	BIR	BUG	ZOL	DIJ	NC	0
1990	Crypton Engineering	DON	SIL; Ret	PAU; Ret	JER; Ret	MNZ; 4	PER; Ret	HOC; Ret	BRH; 9	BIR; Ret	BUG; Ret	NOG; 18	16th	3
1991	Crypton Engineering	VAL; 18	PAU	JER	MUG	PER	HOC	BRH	SPA	BUG	NOG		NC	0

=== Complete Japanese Formula 3000 results ===
(key) (Races in bold indicate pole position; races in italics indicate fastest lap)

Year	Entrant	1	2	3	4	5	6	7	8	DC	Points
1989	Motor Sport Development	SUZ; Ret	FUJ; 9	MIN; 11	SUZ; 6	SUG; Ret	FUJ; 19	SUZ; 7	SUZ; Ret	17th	1

=== Complete Formula One results ===
(key)

Year	Entrant	Chassis	Engine	1	2	3	4	5	6	7	8	9	10	11	12	13	14	15	16	WDC	Points
1991	Automobiles Gonfaronnaises Sportives	AGS JH25	Cosworth V8	USA	BRA	SMR; DNQ	MON; DNQ	CAN; DNQ	MEX; DNQ											NC	0
1991	Automobiles Gonfaronnaises Sportives	AGS JH25B	Cosworth V8							FRA; DNQ	GBR; DNQ	GER; DNPQ	HUN; DNPQ	BEL; DNPQ	ITA; DNPQ					NC	0
1991	Automobiles Gonfaronnaises Sportives	AGS JH27	Cosworth V8													POR; DNPQ	ESP; DNPQ	JPN	AUS	NC	0
1993	Minardi Team	Minardi M193	Ford V8	RSA; Ret	BRA; Ret	EUR; 6	SMR; 6	ESP; Ret	MON; 11	CAN; Ret	FRA; Ret	GBR	GER	HUN	BEL	ITA	POR	JPN	AUS	19th	2

Sporting positions
Preceded by Inaugural	American Racing Series; Champion; 1986	Succeeded by Didier Theys
Preceded by Randy Lanier	Indianapolis 500; Rookie of the Year; 1987	Succeeded by Bill Vukovich III
Preceded by Chip Robinson	CART; Rookie of the Year; 1987	Succeeded by John Jones
