= 1993 Brazilian Grand Prix =

- Race 2 of 16 in the 1993 Formula One World Championship
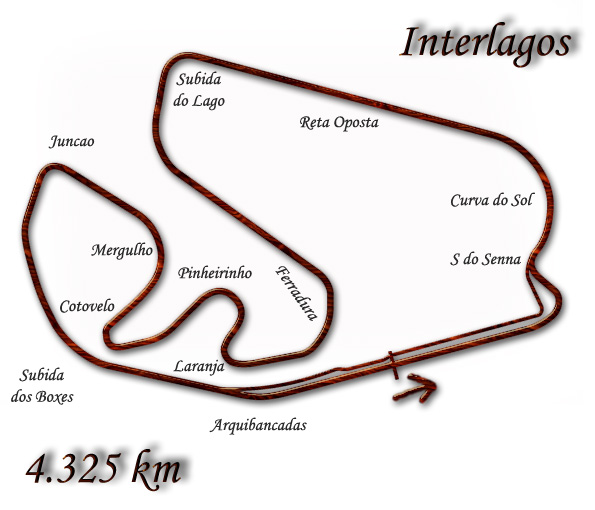

Race details
- Date: 28 March 1993
- Location: Autódromo José Carlos Pace; São Paulo, Brazil
- Course: Permanent racing facility
- Course length: 4.325 km (2.687 miles)
- Distance: 71 laps, 307.075 km (190.808 miles)
- Weather: Dry first then torrential rain for a short period; later drying and staying dry for the rest of the race

Pole position
Driver	(France) Alain Prost	Williams-Renault
- Time: 1:15.866

Fastest lap
Driver	(Germany) Michael Schumacher	Benetton-Ford
- Time: 1:20.024 on lap 61

Podium
First	(Brazil) Ayrton Senna	McLaren-Ford
Second	(United Kingdom) Damon Hill	Williams-Renault
Third	(Germany) Michael Schumacher	Benetton-Ford

The 1993 Brazilian Grand Prix was a Formula One motor race held at Interlagos on 28 March 1993. It was the second race of the 1993 Formula One World Championship.

The 71-lap race was won by local hero Ayrton Senna, driving a McLaren-Ford, with Briton Damon Hill second in a Williams-Renault and German Michael Schumacher third in a Benetton-Ford. Senna's victory marked McLaren's 100th race win in Formula One. Senna was the last Brazilian driver to win his home race until Felipe Massa in 2006.

== Report ==
=== Qualifying ===
With just 26 cars now in the running after the March team withdrew from the World Championship, FISA decided to reduce the grid to 24 to keep some element of competition in qualifying. However on unanimous appeal by the teams, this was increased to 25 so that every team would have at least one car in the race.

Brazil was Senna's home race but he was able to do nothing to prevent the Williams being 1–2 in qualifying with Prost on pole ahead of Hill. Senna was third ahead of Schumacher, Andretti and Patrese. The sole non-qualifier was Ivan Capelli, who was nearly 6 seconds off pole. After failing to qualify for the race, he left the Jordan team by mutual consent. He did not race in Formula One again.

=== Race ===
At the start, Senna got ahead of Hill but Andretti hit Berger with both crashing hard in the tyre barrier in turn 1. Both of them along with Brundle and Fabrizio Barbazza's Minardi were out. The order was: Prost, Senna, Hill, a fast starting Jean Alesi, Schumacher, and Lehto.

Schumacher passed Alesi on lap 2, but his teammate Patrese only lasted until the fourth lap when his suspension failed. While Prost built up a substantial lead, Senna was under pressure from Hill who took second on lap 11. On lap 25, Senna was issued a stop-go penalty for lapping a backmarker under yellow flags and dropped behind Schumacher. There was a heavy rain shower, and many drivers pitted for wet tyres, including Senna, Schumacher and Hill, while Prost stayed out on slick tyres. Several drivers spun, with both Ukyo Katayama and Aguri Suzuki crashing on the start–finish straight on lap 27, the Footwork partially blocking the circuit and bringing out the safety car – the second time this had been seen in Formula 1 following its trial at the 1973 Canadian Grand Prix. Fittipaldi spun at the first corner on lap 30 with his car stopped in the middle of the track. With the rain coming down harder, Prost lost control and, unable to avoid Fittipaldi's car, crashed into him, taking them both out of the race. As the wreckage was cleared, the new safety car controlled the field, Hill led Senna, Schumacher (who had lost time during his pit stop because his car fell off the jack), Alesi, Johnny Herbert, and Lehto. They were followed by Alessandro Zanardi, Philippe Alliot, Mark Blundell, Derek Warwick, rookie Luca Badoer, Karl Wendlinger, Andrea de Cesaris, Érik Comas, and Michele Alboreto.

The rain stopped and the safety car went in, and the order stayed as listed. The sun then came out, it began to dry rapidly and everyone stopped for dry tyres. Johnny Herbert had pitted for slicks right when the safety car pulled back into the pits, and he was to move up to third place due to this early change back to slicks.

Just after the tyre stops Senna passed Hill for the lead and pulled away. Behind, Schumacher and Alesi had stop-go penalties for passing under yellow flags, Schumacher dropping to fifth and Alesi going down to ninth. Schumacher passed Blundell and then Herbert to take third. Senna won from Hill, Schumacher, Herbert, Blundell and Alessandro Zanardi. After the race, several Brazilian fans invaded the circuit in celebration of Senna’s victory (similar to the English fans at the British Grand Prix of the previous year with Nigel Mansell).

== Classification ==
=== Qualifying ===
Pos	No	Driver	Constructor	Q1	Q2	Gap
1	2	(France) Alain Prost	Williams-Renault	1:16.809	1:15.866	
2	0	(United Kingdom) Damon Hill	Williams-Renault	1:17.856	1:16.859	+0.993
3	8	(Brazil) Ayrton Senna	McLaren-Ford	1:18.639	1:17.697	+1.831
4	5	(Germany) Michael Schumacher	Benetton-Ford	1:19.061	1:17.821	+1.955
5	7	(United States) Michael Andretti	McLaren-Ford	1:20.093	1:18.635	+2.769
6	6	(Italy) Riccardo Patrese	Benetton-Ford	1:20.388	1:19.049	+3.183
7	30	(Finland) JJ Lehto	Sauber	1:20.571	1:19.207	+3.341
8	29	(Austria) Karl Wendlinger	Sauber	1:19.230	1:19.270	+3.364
9	27	(France) Jean Alesi	Ferrari	1:19.260	1:19.549	+3.394
10	26	(United Kingdom) Mark Blundell	Ligier-Renault	1:20.281	1:19.296	+3.430
11	19	(France) Philippe Alliot	Larrousse-Lamborghini	1:20.057	1:19.340	+3.474
12	12	(United Kingdom) Johnny Herbert	Lotus-Ford	1:19.830	1:19.435	+3.569
13	28	(Austria) Gerhard Berger	Ferrari	1:19.561	1:19.735	+3.695
14	14	(Brazil) Rubens Barrichello	Jordan-Hart	1:20.999	1:19.593	+3.727
15	11	(Italy) Alessandro Zanardi	Lotus-Ford	1:20.891	1:19.804	+3.938
16	25	(United Kingdom) Martin Brundle	Ligier-Renault	1:20.390	1:19.835	+3.969
17	20	(France) Érik Comas	Larrousse-Lamborghini	1:20.061	1:19.868	+4.002
18	9	(United Kingdom) Derek Warwick	Footwork-Mugen-Honda	1:21.532	1:20.064	+4.198
19	10	(Japan) Aguri Suzuki	Footwork-Mugen-Honda	1:22.297	1:20.232	+4.366
20	23	(Brazil) Christian Fittipaldi	Minardi-Ford	1:21.547	1:20.716	+4.850
21	22	(Italy) Luca Badoer	Lola-Ferrari	1:22.938	1:20.908	+5.042
22	3	(Japan) Ukyo Katayama	Tyrrell-Yamaha	1:21.923	1:20.991	+5.125
23	4	(Italy) Andrea de Cesaris	Tyrrell-Yamaha	1:21.224	1:21.368	+5.358
24	24	(Italy) Fabrizio Barbazza	Minardi-Ford	1:22.112	1:21.228	+5.362
25	21	(Italy) Michele Alboreto	Lola-Ferrari	1:21.752	1:21.488	+5.622
DNQ	15	(Italy) Ivan Capelli	Jordan-Hart	1:23.674	1:21.789	+5.923

=== Race ===
Pos	No	Driver	Constructor	Laps	Time/Retired	Grid	Points
1	8	(Brazil) Ayrton Senna	McLaren-Ford	71	1:51:15.485	3	10
2	0	(United Kingdom) Damon Hill	Williams-Renault	71	+ 16.625	2	6
3	5	(Germany) Michael Schumacher	Benetton-Ford	71	+ 45.436	4	4
4	12	(United Kingdom) Johnny Herbert	Lotus-Ford	71	+ 46.557	12	3
5	26	(United Kingdom) Mark Blundell	Ligier-Renault	71	+ 52.127	10	2
6	11	(Italy) Alessandro Zanardi	Lotus-Ford	70	+ 1 Lap	15	1
7	19	(France) Philippe Alliot	Larrousse-Lamborghini	70	+ 1 Lap	11	
8	27	(France) Jean Alesi	Ferrari	70	+ 1 Lap	9	
9	9	(United Kingdom) Derek Warwick	Footwork-Mugen-Honda	69	+ 2 Laps	18	
10	20	(France) Érik Comas	Larrousse-Lamborghini	69	+ 2 Laps	17	
11	21	(Italy) Michele Alboreto	Lola-Ferrari	68	+ 3 Laps	25	
12	22	(Italy) Luca Badoer	Lola-Ferrari	68	+ 3 Laps	21	
Ret	29	(Austria) Karl Wendlinger	Sauber	61	Engine	8	
Ret	30	(Finland) JJ Lehto	Sauber	52	Electrical	7	
Ret	4	(Italy) Andrea de Cesaris	Tyrrell-Yamaha	48	Fuel system	23	
Ret	2	(France) Alain Prost	Williams-Renault	29	Collision/Spun off	1	
Ret	23	(Brazil) Christian Fittipaldi	Minardi-Ford	28	Collision/Spun off	20	
Ret	10	(Japan) Aguri Suzuki	Footwork-Mugen-Honda	27	Accident	19	
Ret	3	(Japan) Ukyo Katayama	Tyrrell-Yamaha	26	Accident	22	
Ret	14	(Brazil) Rubens Barrichello	Jordan-Hart	13	Gearbox	14	
Ret	6	(Italy) Riccardo Patrese	Benetton-Ford	3	Suspension	6	
Ret	7	(United States) Michael Andretti	McLaren-Ford	0	Collision	5	
Ret	28	(Austria) Gerhard Berger	Ferrari	0	Collision	13	
Ret	25	(United Kingdom) Martin Brundle	Ligier-Renault	0	Collision	16	
Ret	24	(Italy) Fabrizio Barbazza	Minardi-Ford	0	Collision	24	

== Championship standings after the race ==
Drivers' Championship standings

	Pos	Driver	Points
1	1	(Brazil) Ayrton Senna	16
1	2	(France) Alain Prost	10
18	3	(United Kingdom) Damon Hill	6
1	4	(United Kingdom) Mark Blundell	6
7	5	(Germany) Michael Schumacher	4

Constructors' Championship standings

	Pos	Constructor	Points
	1	(United Kingdom) Williams-Renault	16
	2	(United Kingdom) McLaren-Ford	16
	3	(France) Ligier-Renault	6
6	4	(United Kingdom) Benetton-Ford	4
6	5	(United Kingdom) Lotus-Ford	4

- Note: Only the top five positions are included for both sets of standings.

Previous race: 1993 South African Grand Prix	FIA Formula One World Championship; 1993 season	Next race: 1993 European Grand Prix
Previous race: 1992 Brazilian Grand Prix	Brazilian Grand Prix	Next race: 1994 Brazilian Grand Prix
