= 1993 European Grand Prix =

- Race 3 of 16 in the 1993 Formula One World Championship

Race details
- Date: 11 April 1993
- Official name: Sega European Grand Prix
- Location: Donington Park, Leicestershire, United Kingdom
- Course: Permanent racing facility
- Course length: 4.023 km (2.500 miles)
- Distance: 76 laps, 305.748 km (189.983 miles)
- Weather: Very cold, rain with dry spells

Pole position
Driver	(France) Alain Prost	Williams-Renault
- Time: 1:10.458

Fastest lap
Driver	(Brazil) Ayrton Senna	McLaren-Ford
- Time: 1:18.029 (lap record) on lap 57

Podium
First	(Brazil) Ayrton Senna	McLaren-Ford
Second	(United Kingdom) Damon Hill	Williams-Renault
Third	(France) Alain Prost	Williams-Renault

The 1993 European Grand Prix (formally the Sega European Grand Prix) was a Formula One motor race held on 11 April 1993 at Donington Park, Leicestershire. It was the third race of the 1993 FIA Formula One World Championship. The race was contested over 76 laps and was won by Ayrton Senna for the McLaren team, ahead of second-placed Damon Hill and third-placed Alain Prost, both driving for the Williams team.

Senna's drive to victory is regarded as one of his finest, and his first lap exploits are particularly lauded, in which he passed four drivers – Michael Schumacher, Karl Wendlinger, Damon Hill and Alain Prost – to take the lead in a single lap in damp conditions. The race was the first held under the European Grand Prix title since 1985, and to date is the only Formula One Grand Prix to have been held at the Donington Park circuit.

== Report ==
=== Background ===
After plans to hold an Asian Grand Prix at the Nippon Autopolis in Japan failed to materialise, the first European Grand Prix for eight years was run as the third race of the 1993 season. Donington Park was awarded the race, having unsuccessfully bid to host the British Grand Prix. Video game company Sega sponsored the race and the logo could be seen throughout the Grand Prix and on the podium. Sega also had naming rights to the Grand Prix.

Ivan Capelli had agreed to part ways with the Jordan team after failing to qualify at the previous round in Brazil. He was replaced by veteran Belgian driver Thierry Boutsen.

=== Race ===
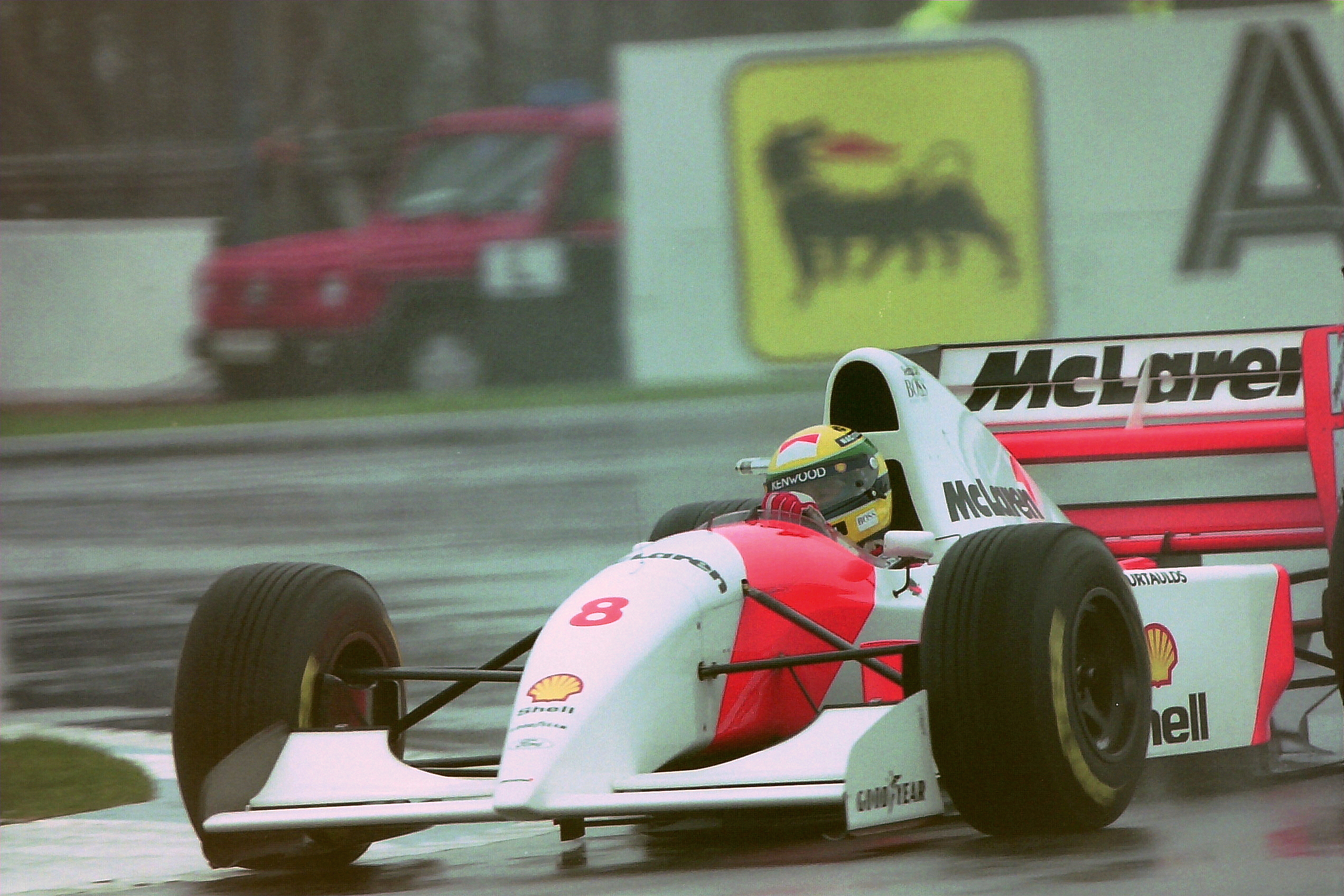
Ayrton Senna won the race for McLaren.

The Williams cars were 1–2 in qualifying with Prost on pole ahead of Hill, Schumacher, Senna, Wendlinger and Michael Andretti. At the start, it was damp and Schumacher blocked Senna and both lost time and Wendlinger took third. Having dropped to fifth, Senna quickly passed Schumacher at the third corner. He then went after Wendlinger, passing him through the Craner Curves with Schumacher and Andretti trying to follow through. Schumacher went through but Andretti hit Wendlinger and both were out, meaning Andretti was still yet to complete a race in his Formula One career. Senna went after Hill now and took second at McLean's Corner. Now Prost was the target and the lead was taken at the penultimate corner – the Melbourne Hairpin. Going into the second lap, Senna led Prost, Hill, Rubens Barrichello (who had started 12th), Jean Alesi, Schumacher and JJ Lehto.

The track began to dry and everyone pitted for dry tyres. Lehto was fifth, having started from the pit lane, but he retired with handling problems on lap 14. Gerhard Berger took the place but he too retired with suspension problems six laps later. The rain returned and the leaders now pitted for wets. Mark Blundell was forced off by Senna whilst battling Fittipaldi at the Esses and then spun off backwards into the gravel trap whilst attempting to rejoin the track. Schumacher stayed out and was leading but spun out on lap 23 as a result of being on the wrong tyres. The track began to dry and everyone pitted once again with Senna having a problem and losing 20 seconds. Prost now led Senna, Hill, Barrichello, Derek Warwick and Johnny Herbert.

It began to rain and the two Williams stopped for wets while Senna stayed out. It was the correct decision because it began to dry again. The Williams stopped yet again for dries. Prost stalled in the pits in his stop and when he rejoined, he was a lap behind and down in fourth. Barrichello was now second but it rained and then stopped again. He went to the pits twice and by now Hill was in second, albeit a lap down. Barrichello, third, had trouble with his fuel pressure and retired, giving the place to Prost. Senna set the fastest lap on lap 57, on a lap when he drove into the pit lane but aborted the pit stop, showing that there actually was a shortcut through the pit lane. This is due to the Grand Prix configuration of Donington, which has the pit entry before the final hairpin corner onto the start/finish straight.

Senna won from Hill and Prost, having made four pit stops in the wet-dry conditions compared to Prost's seven. Williams technical director Patrick Head explained: "Our active car maintained very low ride heights, just a few millimetres above the ground, and gained aerodynamic performance by this, but when the water was deeper than the ride height of the car, our drivers were 'surfing'". Herbert finished fourth for Lotus, stopping only once, while all the other finishing drivers made several pit stops. Riccardo Patrese and Fabrizio Barbazza completed the top six. By the end, Senna had lapped the entire field except for Hill, who finished over a minute behind.

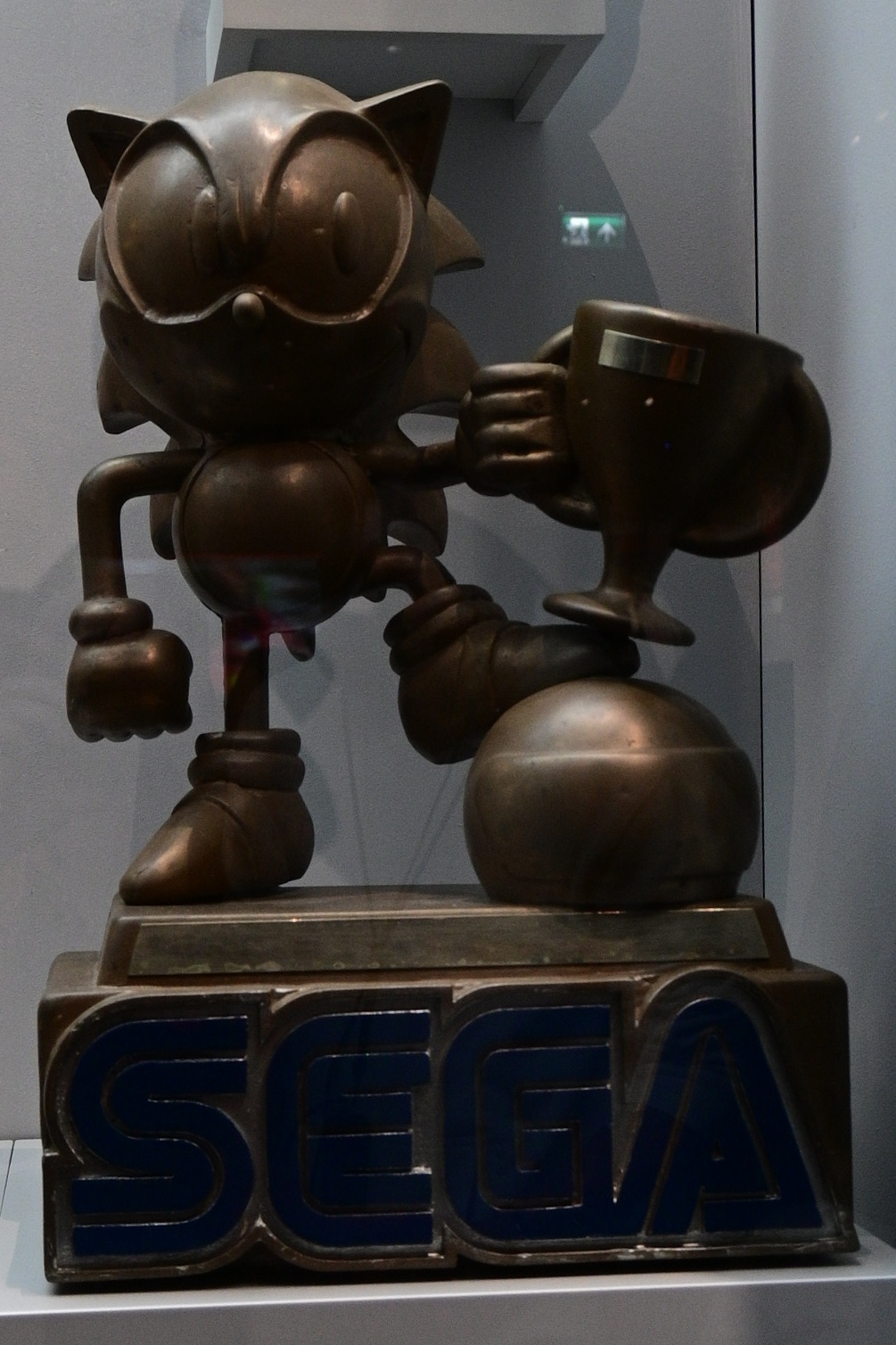
The Sonic the Hedgehog trophy

At the end of the race, Senna was led onto a podium and given a trophy that depicted Sega's mascot, Sonic the Hedgehog, holding a trophy with the Sega logo underneath. A widely circulated image shows Senna holding the trophy. After this marketing photo op, he was given the official award, a trophy that does not depict either Sonic the Hedgehog or the Sega logo. McLaren is still in possession of the Sega trophy; for a long time, it was thought to have been lost until McLaren's official Twitter account revealed it is in one of their storerooms. On 12 June 2020, McLaren put the trophy in a trophy case in McLaren Technology Centre.

== Classification ==
=== Qualifying ===
Pos	No	Driver	Constructor	Q1	Q2	Gap
1	2	(France) Alain Prost	Williams-Renault	1:24.467	1:10.458	
2	0	(United Kingdom) Damon Hill	Williams-Renault	1:24.014	1:10.762	+0.304
3	5	(Germany) Michael Schumacher	Benetton-Ford	1:26.264	1:12.008	+1.550
4	8	(Brazil) Ayrton Senna	McLaren-Ford	1:23.976	1:12.107	+1.649
5	29	(Austria) Karl Wendlinger	Sauber	1:26.805	1:12.738	+2.280
6	7	(United States) Michael Andretti	McLaren-Ford	1:26.859	1:12.739	+2.281
7	30	(Finland) JJ Lehto	Sauber	1:25.469	1:12.763	+2.305
8	28	(Austria) Gerhard Berger	Ferrari	1:25.971	1:12.862	+2.404
9	27	(France) Jean Alesi	Ferrari	1:25.699	1:12.980	+2.522
10	6	(Italy) Riccardo Patrese	Benetton-Ford	1:27.273	1:12.982	+2.524
11	12	(United Kingdom) Johnny Herbert	Lotus-Ford	1:27.173	1:13.328	+2.870
12	14	(Brazil) Rubens Barrichello	Jordan-Hart	1:26.557	1:13.514	+3.056
13	11	(Italy) Alessandro Zanardi	Lotus-Ford	1:28.782	1:13.560	+3.102
14	9	(United Kingdom) Derek Warwick	Footwork-Mugen-Honda	1:28.096	1:13.664	+3.206
15	19	(France) Philippe Alliot	Larrousse-Lamborghini	1:28.648	1:13.665	+3.207
16	23	(Brazil) Christian Fittipaldi	Minardi-Ford	1:28.065	1:13.666	+3.208
17	20	(France) Érik Comas	Larrousse-Lamborghini	1:29.310	1:13.970	+3.512
18	3	(Japan) Ukyo Katayama	Tyrrell-Yamaha	1:29.851	1:14.121	+3.663
19	15	(Belgium) Thierry Boutsen	Jordan-Hart	1:28.701	1:14.246	+3.788
20	24	(Italy) Fabrizio Barbazza	Minardi-Ford	1:27.275	1:14.274	+3.816
21	26	(United Kingdom) Mark Blundell	Ligier-Renault	1:27.302	1:14.301	+3.843
22	25	(United Kingdom) Martin Brundle	Ligier-Renault	1:26.788	1:14.306	+3.848
23	10	(Japan) Aguri Suzuki	Footwork-Mugen-Honda	1:30.107	1:14.927	+4.469
24	21	(Italy) Michele Alboreto	Lola-Ferrari	1:30.049	1:15.322	+4.864
25	4	(Italy) Andrea de Cesaris	Tyrrell-Yamaha	1:29.177	1:15.417	+4.959
DNQ	22	(Italy) Luca Badoer	Lola-Ferrari	1:31.178	1:15.641	+5.183

=== Race ===
Pos	No	Driver	Constructor	Laps	Time/Retired	Grid	Points
1	8	(Brazil) Ayrton Senna	McLaren-Ford	76	1:50:46.570	4	10
2	0	(United Kingdom) Damon Hill	Williams-Renault	76	+ 1:23.199	2	6
3	2	(France) Alain Prost	Williams-Renault	75	+ 1 lap	1	4
4	12	(United Kingdom) Johnny Herbert	Lotus-Ford	75	+ 1 lap	11	3
5	6	(Italy) Riccardo Patrese	Benetton-Ford	74	+ 2 laps	10	2
6	24	(Italy) Fabrizio Barbazza	Minardi-Ford	74	+ 2 laps	20	1
7	23	(Brazil) Christian Fittipaldi	Minardi-Ford	73	+ 3 laps	16	
8	11	(Italy) Alessandro Zanardi	Lotus-Ford	72	+ 4 laps	13	
9	20	(France) Érik Comas	Larrousse-Lamborghini	72	+ 4 laps	17	
10	14	(Brazil) Rubens Barrichello	Jordan-Hart	70	Fuel pressure	12	
11	21	(Italy) Michele Alboreto	Lola-Ferrari	70	+ 6 laps	24	
Ret	9	(United Kingdom) Derek Warwick	Footwork-Mugen-Honda	66	Gearbox	14	
Ret	15	(Belgium) Thierry Boutsen	Jordan-Hart	61	Throttle	19	
Ret	4	(Italy) Andrea de Cesaris	Tyrrell-Yamaha	55	Gearbox	25	
Ret	27	(France) Jean Alesi	Ferrari	36	Gearbox	9	
Ret	10	(Japan) Aguri Suzuki	Footwork-Mugen-Honda	29	Gearbox	23	
Ret	19	(France) Philippe Alliot	Larrousse-Lamborghini	27	Collision	15	
Ret	5	(Germany) Michael Schumacher	Benetton-Ford	22	Spun off	3	
Ret	26	(United Kingdom) Mark Blundell	Ligier-Renault	20	Spun off	21	
Ret	28	(Austria) Gerhard Berger	Ferrari	19	Suspension	8	
Ret	30	(Finland) JJ Lehto	Sauber	13	Handling	7	
Ret	3	(Japan) Ukyo Katayama	Tyrrell-Yamaha	11	Clutch	18	
Ret	25	(United Kingdom) Martin Brundle	Ligier-Renault	7	Spun off	22	
Ret	29	(Austria) Karl Wendlinger	Sauber	0	Collision	5	
Ret	7	(United States) Michael Andretti	McLaren-Ford	0	Collision	6	

== Championship standings after the race ==
Drivers' Championship standings

	Pos	Driver	Points
	1	(Brazil) Ayrton Senna	26
	2	(France) Alain Prost	14
	3	(United Kingdom) Damon Hill	12
	4	(United Kingdom) Mark Blundell	6
1	5	(United Kingdom) Johnny Herbert	6

Constructors' Championship standings

	Pos	Constructor	Points
1	1	(United Kingdom) McLaren-Ford	26
1	2	(United Kingdom) Williams-Renault	26
2	3	(United Kingdom) Lotus-Ford	7
	4	(United Kingdom) Benetton-Ford	6
2	5	(France) Ligier-Renault	6

- Note: Only the top five positions are included for both sets of standings.

Previous race: 1993 Brazilian Grand Prix	FIA Formula One World Championship; 1993 season	Next race: 1993 San Marino Grand Prix
Previous race: 1985 European Grand Prix	European Grand Prix	Next race: 1994 European Grand Prix
Awards
Preceded by 1992 French Grand Prix	Formula One Promotional Trophy for Race Promoter; 1993	Succeeded by 1994 Pacific Grand Prix
