= Aguri Suzuki =

Japanese racing driver and motorsport executive (born 1960)

- 鈴木 亜久里
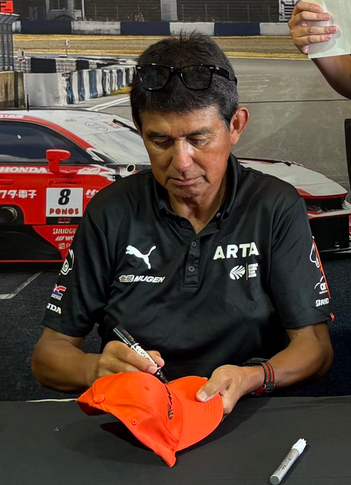
- Suzuki in 2025
- Born: 8 September 1960 (age 66); Tokyo, Japan

Formula One World Championship career
- Nationality: (Japan) Japanese
- Active years: 1988–1995
- Team(s): Larrousse, Zakspeed, Footwork, Jordan, Ligier
- Entries: 88 (64 starts)
- Championships: 0
- Wins: 0
- Podiums: 1
- Career points: 8
- Pole positions: 0
- Fastest laps: 0
- First entry: 1988 Japanese Grand Prix
- Last entry: 1995 Japanese Grand Prix

24 Hours of Le Mans career
- Years: 1986–1988, 1990, 1996–1999
- Teams: Nissan, Toyota
- Best finish: 3rd (1998)
- Class wins: 0

Aguri Suzuki (Japanese: 鈴木 亜久里, Hepburn: Suzuki Aguri; born 8 September 1960) is a Japanese former racing driver and motorsport executive who competed in Formula One from 1988 to 1995.

Suzuki entered 88 Formula One Grands Prix, achieving a best result of third at the 1990 Japanese Grand Prix, becoming the first Asian driver to score a podium finish. He also won the Japanese Formula 3000 Championship in 1988, and later finished third overall at the 24 Hours of Le Mans in 1998. He was also a race-winner in the All-Japan GT Championship.

Suzuki became involved in team ownership after his Formula One career, first forming Autobacs Racing Team Aguri (ARTA) in 1997 in partnership with Autobacs. ARTA has competed mostly in Super GT, where they have won titles in both the GT500 and GT300 classes. He was the owner of the Super Aguri F1 team, which participated in Formula One from 2006 to 2008. He also formed Team Aguri, which raced in Formula E from 2014 to 2016.

== Early life ==
Suzuki was born in Tokyo; his father Masashi Suzuki was of mixed ancestry from Japan and Martinique. Masashi Suzuki had worked as an aircraft technician for Honda Airways, and in 1973 established a go-cart shop.

Suzuki was named after the main character in the Kuri-chan comic strip. He attended Josai University majoring in the sciences, but did not complete his degree.

== Racing career ==
=== Early career ===
Suzuki began racing karts in 1972, at the age of 12. In 1978, he won the Japanese kart championship and in 1979 made his debut in the Japanese Formula Three (All-Japan F3) championship. He continued in karting and in 1981 was again Japanese Kart Champion. In 1983, he finished second in the All-Japan F3 series, driving a Hayashi-Toyota. He then turned to touring car racing and, driving for the Nissan factory team won the Japanese title in 1986. That same year, he made his debut in Japanese F2 and drove in the Le Mans 24 Hours. In 1987, he finished runner-up in the Japanese F3000 series, winning one race (Suzuka). In 1988, driving a March-Yamaha he won the title with three wins (Fuji, Nishi-Nippon and Suzuka).

=== Formula One career ===
In 1988, Suzuki raced in European F3000 with Footwork, before he debuted in Formula One on October 30 at his home race, replacing the ill Yannick Dalmas in the Larrousse-Lola. Zakspeed, who were using Yamaha engines, hired Suzuki for 1989, but he failed to pre-qualify in all 16 races.

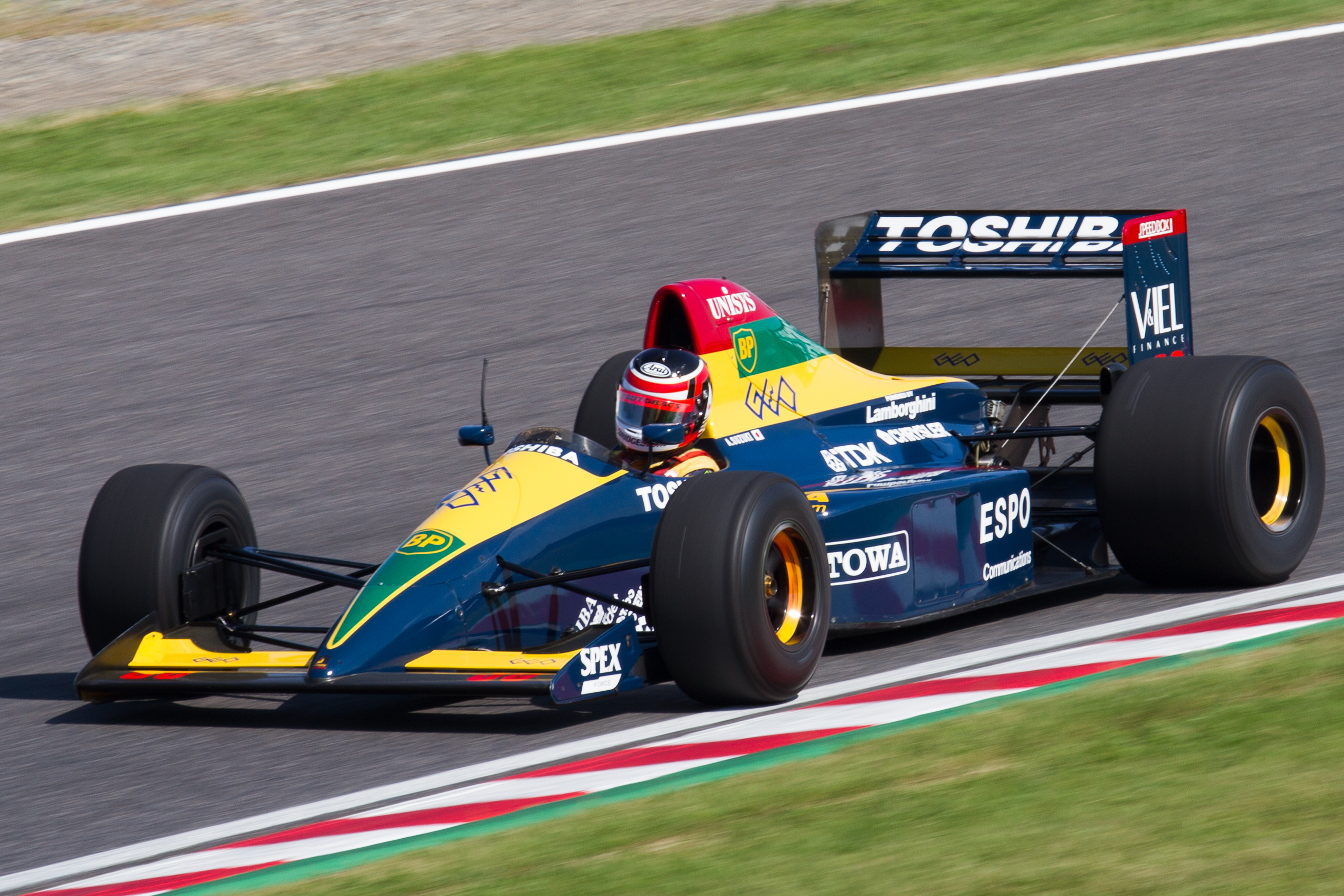
Suzuki demonstrates his Larrousse-Lola 90 at Suzuka in 2012 - the scene of his podium finish 22 years earlier.

For 1990 and 1991, Suzuki drove again for Larrousse. He finished sixth three times, before finishing third at Suzuka – the first ever podium for an Asian driver in F1. He also set the second-fastest lap.

In 1992 and 1993, Suzuki was at Footwork alongside Michele Alboreto and then Derek Warwick, but both usually outperformed him. He shared a Ligier with Martin Brundle in 1995, but only scored one point in his races, and was criticised by Mika Salo after the two collided in Buenos Aires. A massive crash in practice for the 1995 Japanese Grand Prix caused a neck injury which saw him miss the race, and he immediately announced his retirement.

Suzuki scored a total of eight championship points in F1. At the time he retired, he was the second most successful Japanese F1 driver after Satoru Nakajima in terms of points scored, but Takuma Sato and Kamui Kobayashi have since passed them both.

=== After Formula One ===
Suzuki later raced in the All Japan Grand Touring Car Championship, and remained involved in Japanese driver development. In 2000, with long-term sponsor Autobacs, he ran Autobacs Racing Team Aguri, which won the GT300 title in 2002, and expanded to Deutsche Tourenwagen Masters a season later. He also launched Super Aguri Fernandez Racing with Adrian Fernandez, running cars in the Indy Racing League.

== Team ownership ==
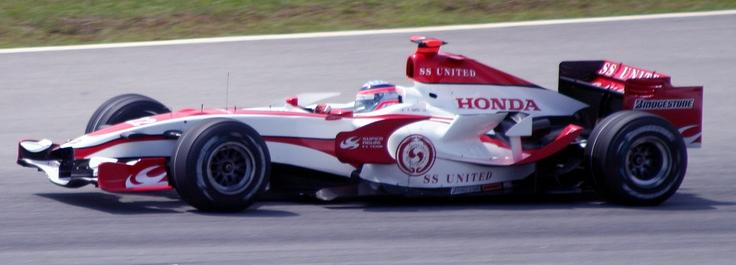
Takuma Sato driving for Super Aguri F1 at the 2007 Malaysian Grand Prix

From 2006, Suzuki ran the Super Aguri F1 Formula One team with the backing of Honda. He put his new team together in four and half months from his initial announcement on 1 November 2005. The team's initial entry was rejected by the FIA after they failed to secure financial guarantees before the entry deadline, and their acceptance was not formally confirmed until 26 January 2006. The team made its debut at the Bahrain Grand Prix on 12 March 2006. In 2007, Takuma Sato scored two top-eight finishes, earning the team its first points, and Super Aguri ended up ninth in the Constructors' World Championship. On 6 May 2008, after competing in the opening four races of the season, the team withdrew from Formula One due to financial problems.

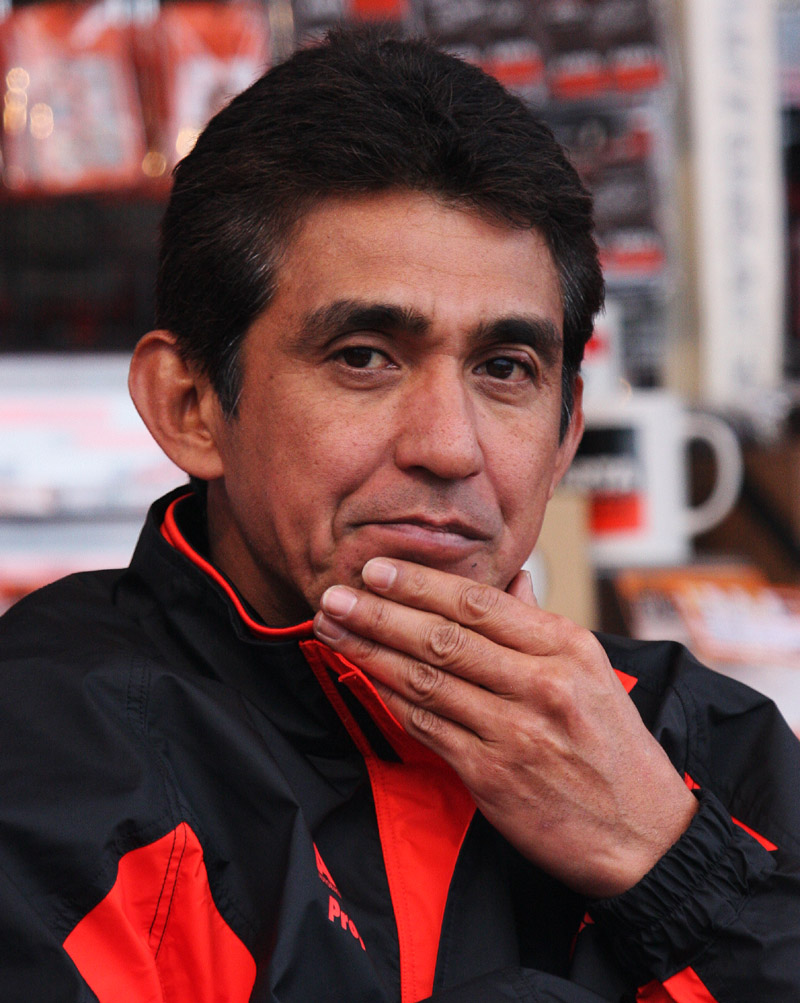
Suzuki in 2008

== Helmet ==
Suzuki's helmet is white with a red line with black sides surrounding the top, a red and black line going from the rear down the chin (forming an A) and a black circle on the top.

== Racing record ==
=== Career summary ===
Season	Series	Team	Races	Wins	Poles	F/Laps	Podiums	Points	Position
1979	Japanese Formula Three	Team Italya With Tetsu	2	0	0	0	0	2	14th
1980	Japanese Formula Three	Team Italya With Tetsu	4	0	0	0	0	14	13th
1981	Japanese Formula Three	N/A	7	0	0	?	1	30	7th
1982	Japanese Formula Three	Hayashi Racing	9	0	0	?	5	74	4th
1982	World Sportscar Championship	Kaoru Hoshino	1	0	0	0	0	8	55th
1983	Japanese Formula Three	Hayashi Cars	7	2	3	1	5	62	**2nd**
1983	World Sportscar Championship	Panasport Japan	1	0	0	0	0	0	NC
1984	Japanese Formula Three	N/A	3	1	0	?	1	28	7th
1984	All-Japan Sports Prototype Championship	Autobacs Racing	1	0	0	0	0	0	NC
1985	Japanese Formula Three	N/A	?	?	?	?	?	77	**2nd**
1985	All-Japan Sports Prototype Championship	Central 20 Racing Team	4	0	0	0	0	11	29th
1985	Japanese Formula Two	NC Speed	2	0	0	0	0	4	16th
1985	World Sportscar Championship	Central 20 Racing Team	2	0	0	0	0	1.5	92nd
1985	Macau Grand Prix	Nissan Motorsport	1	0	0	0	0	N/A	DNF
1986	Japanese Touring Car Championship	NISMO	?	?	?	?	?	92	**1st**
1986	All-Japan Endurance Championship	Person's Racing	4	0	0	0	0	11	29th
1986	World Sportscar Championship	Nissan Motorsports	2	0	0	0	0	0	NC
1986	Japanese Formula Two	Yura Takuya Racing Team	1	0	0	0	0	6	13th
1987	Japanese Formula 3000	Footwork Sports Racing Team	9	2	1	?	6	107	**2nd**
1987	All-Japan Sports Prototype Championship	Footwork Sports Racing Team	5	0	1	0	0	6	41st
1987	World Sportscar Championship	Nissan Motorsports	1	0	0	0	0	0	NC
1988	Japanese Formula 3000	Footwork Sports Racing Team	8	3	3	3	6	45	**1st**
1988	All-Japan Sports Prototype Championship	Nissan Motorsports	5	0	1	0	2	30	11th
1988	World Sportscar Championship	Nissan Motorsports	2	0	0	0	0	0	NC
1988	International Formula 3000	Footwork	2	0	0	0	0	0	NC
1988	Asia-Pacific Touring Car Championship	Nissan Motorsports	1	0	0	0	0	0	NC
1988	Formula One	Larrousse Calmels	1	0	0	0	0	0	NC
1989	Formula One	West Zakspeed Racing	0	0	0	0	0	0	NC
1990	Formula One	Espo Larrousse F1	16	0	0	0	1	6	12th
1990	24 Hours of Le Mans	Toyota Team Tom's	1	0	0	0	0	N/A	DNF
1991	Formula One	Larrousse F1	11	0	0	0	0	1	22nd
1992	Formula One	Footwork Mugen Honda	14	0	0	0	0	0	NC
1993	Formula One	Footwork Mugen Honda	16	0	0	0	0	0	NC
1994	Japanese Touring Car Championship	Toyota Team Tom's	15	0	1	1	7	102	5th
1994	Formula One	Sasol Jordan	1	0	0	0	0	0	NC
1995	Formula One	Ligier Gitanes Blondes	5	0	0	0	0	1	17th
1996	All Japan Grand Touring Car Championship	Nismo Team Zexel	6	0	0	0	2	46	6th
1996	24 Hours of Le Mans	Nismo	1	0	0	0	0	N/A	DNF
1996	International Touring Car Championship	UPS Mercedes-AMG	1	0	0	0	0	0	27th
1997	All Japan Grand Touring Car Championship	Nismo	6	1	0	1	3	60	4th
1997	24 Hours of Le Mans	Nissan Motorsports	1	0	0	0	0	N/A	DNF
1997	FIA GT Championship	AMG-Mercedes	1	0	0	0	0	0	NC
1998	All Japan Grand Touring Car Championship	Nismo	6	0	0	0	1	29	8th
1998	24 Hours of Le Mans	Nissan Motorsports	1	0	0	0	1	N/A	**3rd**
1999	All Japan Grand Touring Car Championship	Nismo	7	0	0	0	2	40	6th
1999	24 Hours of Le Mans	Nissan Motorsports	1	0	0	0	0	N/A	DNS
2000	All Japan Grand Touring Car Championship	Autobacs Racing Team Aguri	7	1	0	0	1	24	13th
2007	Formula One	Super Aguri F1	Test driver						

=== Complete Japanese Formula 3000 Championship results ===
(key) (Races in bold indicate pole position) (Races in italics indicate fastest lap)

Year	Entrant	1	2	3	4	5	6	7	8	9	DC	Points
1985	NC Speed	SUZ	FUJ	MIN	SUZ	SUZ	FUJ; DNS	SUZ; 8	SUZ; 10		16th	4
1986	Yura Takuya Racing Team	SUZ	FUJ	MIN	SUZ	SUZ	FUJ	SUZ	SUZ; 6		13th	6
1987	Footwork Sports Racing Team	SUZ; 2	FUJ; 2	MIN; 4	SUZ; 3	SUZ; 2	SUG; Ret	FUJ; Ret	SUZ; 1	**SUZ**; 1	**2nd**	**107**
1988	Footwork Sports Racing Team	SUZ; 2	**FUJ**; 1	**MIN**; 1	**SUZ**; 1	SUG; Ret	FUJ; 2	SUZ; 2	SUZ; Ret		**1st**	**45**

=== Complete Macau Grand Prix results ===
Year	Team	Chassis/Engine	Qualifying	Race1	Race2	Overall ranking
1985	(Japan) Nismo	Ralt・Nissan	28th	19	DNF	DNF

=== Complete 24 Hours of Le Mans results ===
Year	Team	Co-Drivers	Car	Class	Laps	Pos.	Class Pos.
1986	(Japan) Nissan Motorsports	(Japan) Kazuyoshi Hoshino (Japan) Keiji Matsumoto	Nissan R86V	C1	64	DNF	DNF
1987	(Japan) Nissan Motorsports	(Japan) Masahiro Hasemi (Japan) Takao Wada	Nissan 87E	C1	117	DNF	DNF
1988	(Japan) Nissan Motorsports	(Japan) Kazuyoshi Hoshino (Japan) Takao Wada	Nissan (March) R88C	C1	286	DNF	DNF
1990	(Japan) Toyota Team TOM'S	(United Kingdom) Johnny Dumfries (Italy) Roberto Ravaglia	Toyota 90C-V	C1	64	DNF	DNF
1996	(Japan) NISMO	(Japan) Masahiko Kageyama (Japan) Masahiko Kondo	Nissan Skyline GT-R LM	GT1	209	DNF	DNF
1997	(Japan) Nissan Motorsports (United Kingdom) TWR	(Italy) Riccardo Patrese (Belgium) Eric van de Poele	Nissan R390 GT1	GT1	121	DNF	DNF
1998	(Japan) Nissan Motorsports (United Kingdom) TWR	(Japan) Kazuyoshi Hoshino (Japan) Masahiko Kageyama	Nissan R390 GT1	GT1	347	**3rd**	**3rd**
1999	(Japan) Nissan Motorsports	(Japan) Masami Kageyama (Belgium) Eric van de Poele	Nissan R391	LMP	0	DNS	DNS

=== Complete International Formula 3000 results ===
(key) (Races in bold indicate pole position; races in italics indicate fastest lap.)

Year	Entrant	1	2	3	4	5	6	7	8	9	10	11	DC	Points
1988	Footwork	JER	VAL	PAU; 11	SIL; DNQ	MNZ	PER	BRH; Ret	BIR	BUG	ZOL	DIJ	NC	0

=== Complete Formula One results ===
(key) (Races in bold indicate pole position; races in italics indicates fastest lap)

Year	Entrant	Chassis	Engine	1	2	3	4	5	6	7	8	9	10	11	12	13	14	15	16	17	WDC	Points
1988	Larrousse Calmels	Lola LC88	Ford Cosworth DFZ 3.5 V8	BRA	SMR	MON	MEX	CAN	DET	FRA	GBR	GER	HUN	BEL	ITA	POR	ESP	JPN; 16	AUS		NC	0
1989	West Zakspeed Racing	Zakspeed 891	Yamaha 0X88 3.5 V8	BRA; DNPQ	SMR; DNPQ	MON; DNPQ	MEX; DNPQ	USA; DNPQ	CAN; DNPQ	FRA; DNPQ	GBR; DNPQ	GER; DNPQ	HUN; DNPQ	BEL; DNPQ	ITA; DNPQ	POR; DNPQ	ESP; DNPQ	JPN; DNPQ	AUS; DNPQ		NC	0
1990	Espo Larrousse F1	Lola LC89	Lamborghini LE3512 3.5 V12	USA; Ret	BRA; Ret																12th	6
1990	Espo Larrousse F1	Lola LC90	Lamborghini LE3512 3.5 V12			SMR; Ret	MON; Ret	CAN; 12	MEX; Ret	FRA; 7	GBR; 6	GER; Ret	HUN; Ret	BEL; Ret	ITA; Ret	POR; 14	ESP; 6	JPN; 3	AUS; Ret		12th	6
1991	Larrousse F1	Larrousse Lola LC91	Ford Cosworth DFR 3.5 V8	USA; 6	BRA; DNS	SMR; Ret	MON; Ret	CAN; Ret	MEX; Ret	FRA; Ret	GBR; Ret	GER; Ret	HUN; Ret	BEL; DNQ	ITA; DNQ	POR; Ret	ESP; DNQ	JPN; Ret	AUS; DNQ		22nd	1
1992	Footwork Mugen Honda	Footwork FA13	Mugen Honda MF-351H 3.5 V10	RSA; 8	MEX; DNQ	BRA; Ret	ESP; 7	SMR; 10	MON; 11	CAN; DNQ	FRA; Ret	GBR; 12	GER; Ret	HUN; Ret	BEL; 9	ITA; Ret	POR; 10	JPN; 8	AUS; 8		NC	0
1993	Footwork Mugen Honda	Footwork FA13B	Mugen Honda MF-351HB 3.5 V10	RSA; Ret	BRA; Ret																NC	0
1993	Footwork Mugen Honda	Footwork FA14	Mugen Honda MF-351HB 3.5 V10			EUR; Ret	SMR; 9	ESP; 10	MON; Ret	CAN; 13	FRA; 12	GBR; Ret	GER; Ret	HUN; Ret	BEL; Ret	ITA; Ret	POR; Ret	JPN; Ret	AUS; 7		NC	0
1994	Sasol Jordan	Jordan 194	Hart 1035 3.5 V10	BRA	PAC; Ret	SMR	MON	ESP	CAN	FRA	GBR	GER	HUN	BEL	ITA	POR	EUR	JPN	AUS		NC	0
1995	Ligier Gitanes Blondes	Ligier JS41	Mugen Honda MF-301 3.0 V10	BRA; 8	ARG; Ret	SMR; 11	ESP	MON	CAN	FRA	GBR	GER; 6	HUN	BEL	ITA	POR	EUR	PAC; Ret	JPN; DNS	AUS	17th	1

=== Complete Japanese Touring Car Championship (1994-) results ===
Year	Team	Car	1	2	3	4	5	6	7	8	9	10	11	12	13	14	15	16	17	18	DC	pts
1994	Toyota Team Tom's	Toyota Corona	AUT; 1; 9	AUT; 2; 5	SUG; 1	SUG; 2	TOK; 1; 3	TOK; 2; 2	SUZ; 1; 5	SUZ; 2; 4	MIN; 1 Ret	MIN; 2; 3	AID; 1; 2	AID; 2; 2	TSU; 1; 3	TSU; 2 DNS	SEN; 1; 3	SEN; 2 Ret	FUJ; 1; 5	FUJ; 2; 8	5th	102

=== Complete JGTC results ===
(key)

Year	Team	Car	Class	1	2	3	4	5	6	7	DC	Pts
1996	Nismo Team Zexel	Nissan Skyline GT-R	GT500	SUZ; 4	FUJ; Ret	SEN; 7	FUJ; 3	SUG; 5	MIN; 3		6th	46
1997	Nismo	Nissan Skyline GT-R	GT500	SUZ; 1	FUJ; 4	SEN; 2	FUJ; 10	MIN; 9	SUG; 3		4th	60
1998	Nismo	Nissan Skyline GT-R	GT500	SUZ; Ret	FUJ; C	SEN; 2	FUJ; 7	MOT; 11	MIN; 5	SUG; 9	8th	29
1999	Nismo	Nissan Skyline GT-R	GT500	SUZ; 5	FUJ; 11	SUG; 9	MIN; 12	FUJ; 12	TAI; 2	MOT; 2	6th	40
2000	Autobacs Racing Team Aguri	Honda NSX	GT500	MOT; 7	FUJ; Ret	SUG; 15	FUJ; 1	TAI; Ret	MIN; Ret	SUZ; DSQ	13th	24

Sporting positions
Preceded by Naoki Nagasaka	Japanese Touring Car Championship; Champion; 1986	Succeeded by Naoki Nagasaka
Preceded by Kazuyoshi Hoshino	Japanese Formula 3000; Champion; 1988	Succeeded by Hitoshi Ogawa
