= Yannick Dalmas =

French racing driver (born 1961)

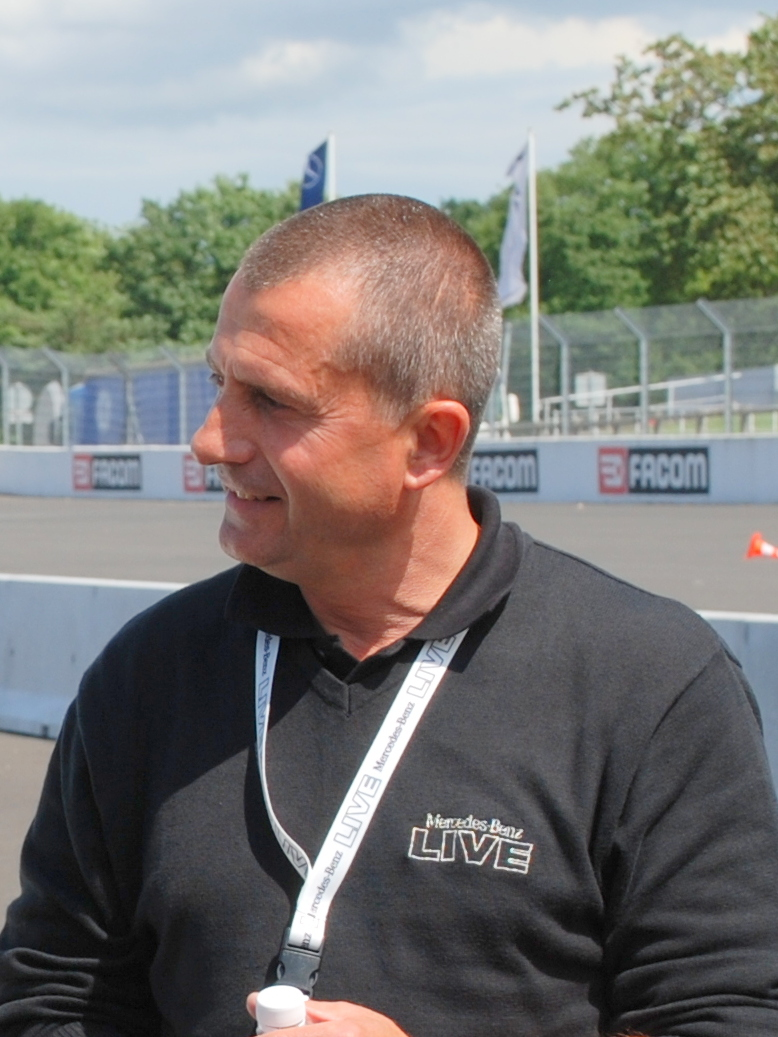
- Dalmas in 2011
- Born: Yannick Paul Marie Dalmas; 28 July 1961 (age 65); Le Beausset, Var, France

Formula One World Championship career
- Nationality: (France) French
- Active years: 1987–1990, 1994
- Team(s): Larrousse, AGS
- Entries: 49 (23 starts)
- Championships: 0
- Wins: 0
- Podiums: 0
- Career points: 0
- Pole positions: 0
- Fastest laps: 0
- First entry: 1987 Mexican Grand Prix
- Last entry: 1994 Portuguese Grand Prix

Yannick Paul Marie Dalmas (French pronunciation: [ja.nik dal.mas]; born 28 July 1961) is a former racing driver from France. He won the 24 Hours of Le Mans four times (in 1992, 1994, 1995 and 1999), each time with a different car manufacturer, a unique feature in the history of the race. Prior to this, he participated in 49 Formula One Grands Prix.

Dalmas has been a Safety Car driver and driver advisor in the FIA World Endurance Championship since its inaugural season in 2012.

== Early career ==
Dalmas began his career in the French Formula Renault series, where he finished third in 1983 with three victories. He returned to the championship in 1984, where six wins from 12 races earned him the title. Dalmas then stepped up to French Formula 3 in 1985, finishing second after winning three races, before beating Jean Alesi in 1986 to clinch a dominant championship crown. Having made his International Formula 3000 debut near the end of 1986, Dalmas contested the series with Oreca Motorsport in 1987. Wins at Pau and Jarama earned him fifth in the standings.

== First Formula One tenure ==
Towards the end of the 1987 Formula One season, Dalmas joined the Larrousse team to drive its new second entry in the final three races. He outqualified teammate Philippe Alliot on his debut at the Mexican Grand Prix, but fell behind him in the race and ended up ninth, last of the finishers. At the season finale in Australia, Dalmas survived the attrition-filled race and finished fifth, but missed out on scoring two championship points as Larrousse had only entered one car for the championship season.

Dalmas remained at Larrousse for the 1988 season. In uncompetitive machinery, Dalmas narrowly missed out on points twice: he was overtaken by Riccardo Patrese on the final lap of the Monaco Grand Prix, thereby finishing seventh, and placed seventh again at Detroit. Dalmas missed the final two races of the season after being diagnosed with Legionellosis. The 1989 campaign proved tumultuous for Dalmas, who only qualified for one of the first six races, before leaving Larrousse to join AGS. With AGS, Dalmas was eliminated in pre-qualifying in each of the season's final nine races, sharing the fate with teammate Gabriele Tarquini. In 1990, Dalmas earned qualification for five of the year's 16 events, scoring a best result of ninth in Spain.

== Switch to endurance; Le Mans success ==
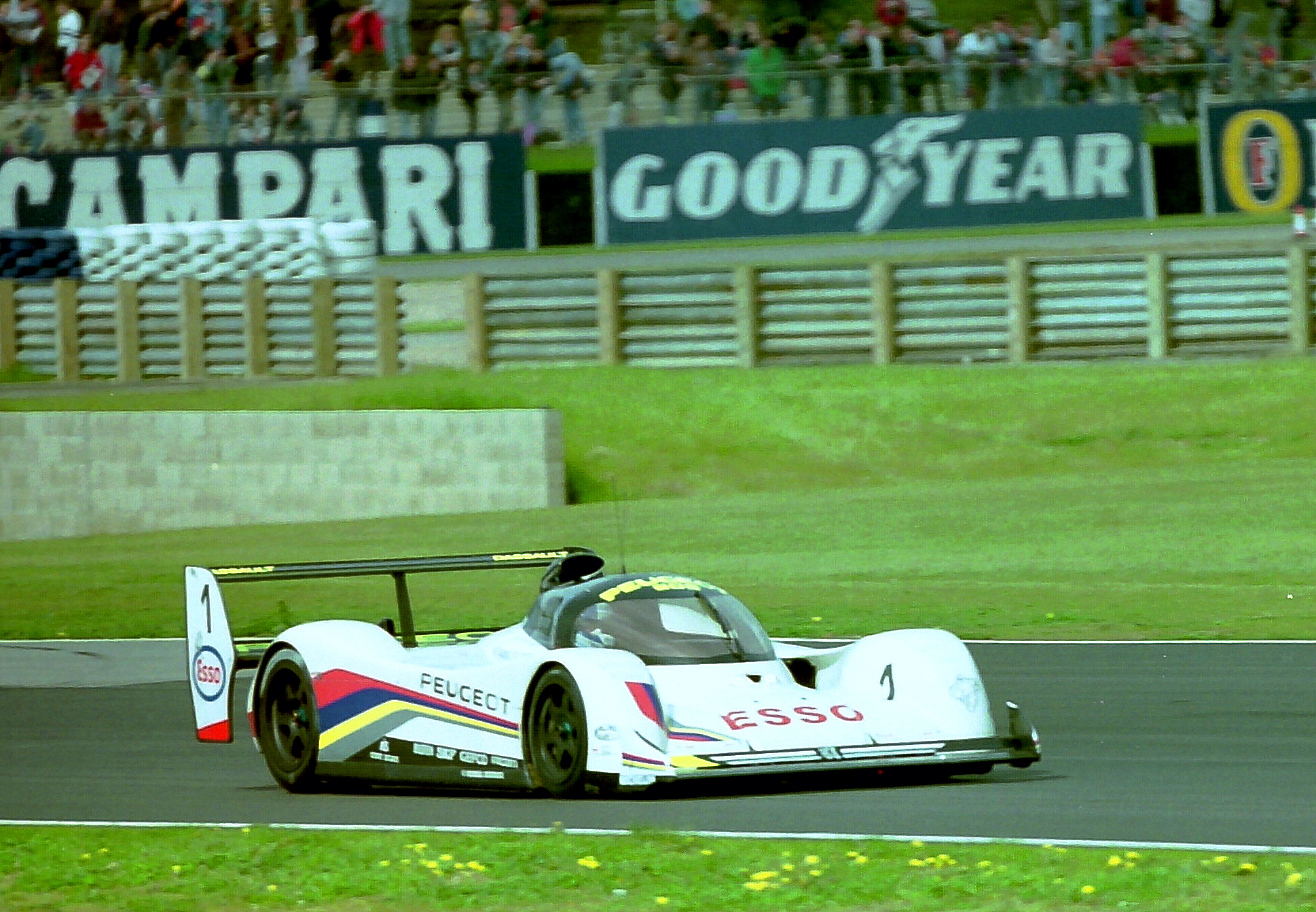
Dalmas racing at Silverstone in 1992

Dalmas joined the Peugeot Sport works team in 1991, partnering Keke Rosberg in the Sportscar World Championship. At the wheel of a Peugeot 905, the pair retired from the opening five events of the season. After the updated 905 Evo 1 Bis was introduced, Dalmas and Rosberg won back-to-back at Magny-Cours and Mexico City, before retiring from the season finale.

In 1992, the final year of the World Sportscar Championship, Dalmas partnered Derek Warwick in the No. 1 905 Evo entry. They finished second in Monza, as Dalmas flipped his car with two laps to go due to fading brakes, and won at Silverstone. At the 24 Hours of Le Mans, Dalmas, Warwick, and Mark Blundell built up a dominant lead during the night and early morning. Despite losing three laps in the morning with an ignition failure, the trio drove home to victory. In a truncated WSC season, Dalmas and Warwick finished second at Donington and clinched a dominant title by winning at Suzuka.

With the death of the WSC, Dalmas had a much more condensed racing programme in 1993. He took part in several touring car races, finishing second at the Spa 24 Hours alongside Michael Bartels and Harald Grohs. At the 1993 24 Hours of Le Mans, Dalmas was joined at Peugeot by Teo Fabi and Thierry Boutsen; the trio finished second in a Peugeot podium lockout.

== Full-time touring car switch and brief F1 comeback ==
Dalmas moved into touring car racing on a permanent basis in 1994. He contested the French Supertouring Championship, placing fourth in the standings with a pair of victories at Dijon. At Le Mans, Dalmas partnered former winner Hurley Haywood and Mauro Baldi in the GT1-class Dauer 962 Le Mans Porsche. The team fought for victory owing to its larger fuel capacity, but were briefly compromised during the evening as Dalmas ran out of fuel on pit entry and had to be pushed to his pit box by the marshals. In spite of having to nurse the car home due to a fragile driveshaft, Dalmas and his teammates profited from Toyota's problems to win the race overall. Later in 1994, Dalmas returned to Formula One to drive two races for Larrousse. He narrowly outqualified teammate Érik Comas at Monza, but retired on lap 19 after spinning off. In Portugal, Dalmas was outqualified by Comas and finished 14th in his last Formula One race.

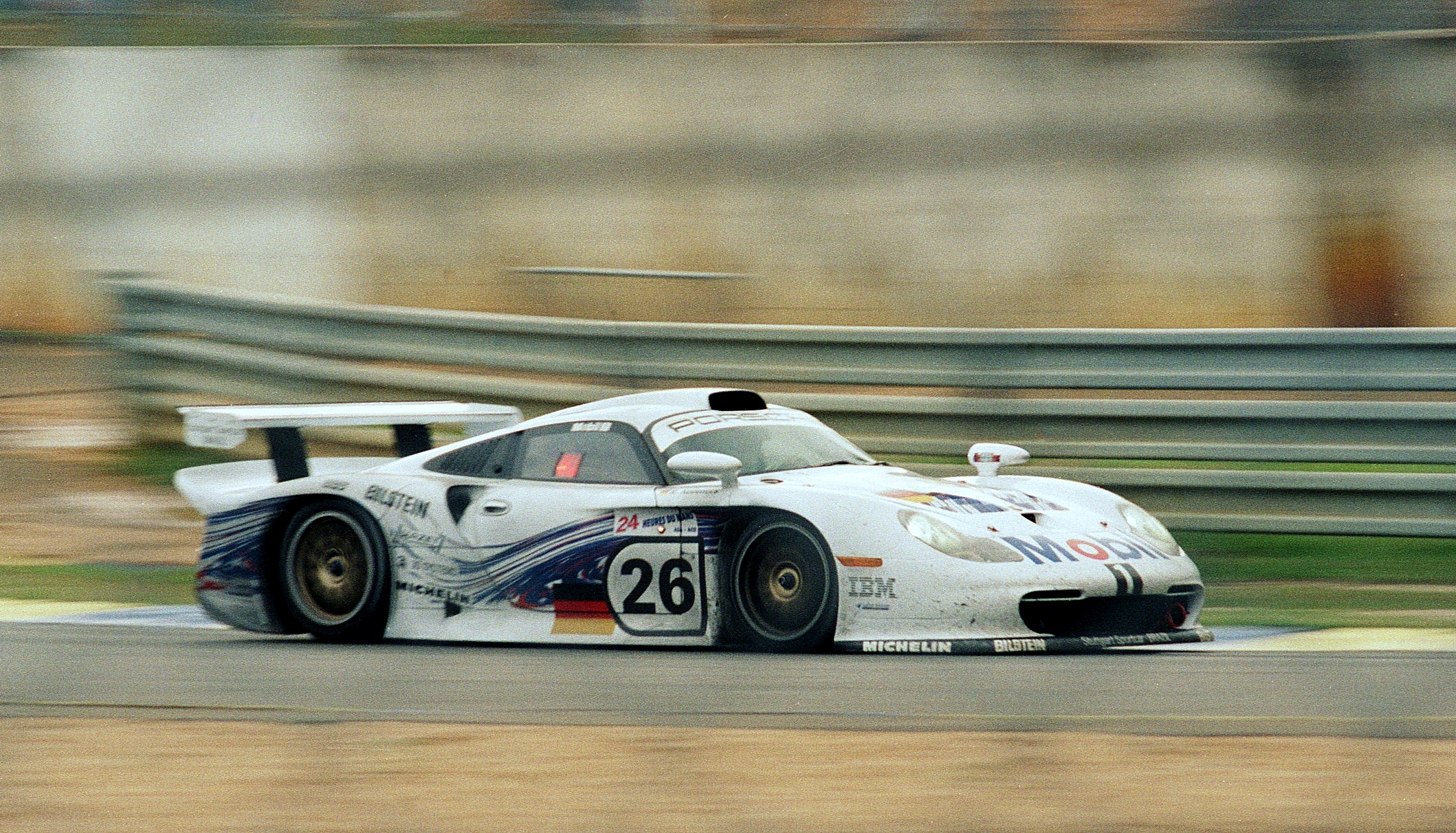
Dalmas racing at the 1997 24 Hours of Le Mans

For the 1995 season, Dalmas became a works driver at Opel in the Deutsche Tourenwagen Meisterschaft. With a best result of sixth at the Singen street circuit, Dalmas ended up 19th in the standings. Dalmas also entered Le Mans again in 1995, this time driving a McLaren F1 GTR alongside JJ Lehto and Masanori Sekiya. They won the race, with a late charge from Bob Wollek (who unlapped himself from Dalmas in the final hour) ending up unsuccessful; this gave Dalmas his third Le Mans victory from four starts. Dalmas later described the GTR as "not a simple car to drive". In 1996, Opel retained Dalmas in the rebranded International Touring Car Championship, though he only improved to 17th overall with no podium finishes. In his fifth Le Mans attempt, contested behind the wheel of a Porsche 911 GT1 with Karl Wendlinger and Scott Goodyear alongside, Dalmas qualified second. During the race, Dalmas lost ten minutes in the seventh hour due to repairs, having gone off at Mulsanne and damaged his car. The trio had an incident-filled race, but still recovered to third overall by the end.

=== FIA GT Championship ===
In 1997, Dalmas joined the newly-formed FIA GT Championship. Having driven the first two rounds for Porsche privateer Roock Racing, Dalmas joined Bob Wollek in the works team's No. 7 entry from the fourth round onwards. Third places at Spa and Mugello, as well as second at Laguna Seca, placed Dalmas 14th overall. Dalmas shone at Le Mans: having pressured the leading Wollek into a mistake, Dalmas took over a dominant lead. During the penultimate hour however, teammate Ralf Kelleners retired their works Porsche, which had caught fire thanks to a transmission oil leak. Nevertheless, Dalmas was able to celebrate victory in one crown jewel event during 1997, as he triumphed at the 12 Hours of Sebring at the wheel of a Ferrari 333 SP.

Dalmas experienced a successful campaign in the 1998 FIA GT Championship. Alongside Allan McNish, he went on a run of six successive podium finishes and ended up third in the standings. His Le Mans ended prematurely, as teammate Michele Alboreto suffered an ignition failure that left him stranded on track. He also notably flipped his Porsche at the Petit Le Mans event that year, in a blowover incident similar to those experienced by Mercedes-Benz at the 1999 24 Hours of Le Mans.

== Final Le Mans victory and retirement ==
From 1999 onwards, Dalmas concentrated on the 24 Hours of Le Mans. He switched to BMW, making his brand debut at the 1999 12 Hours of Sebring. The 1999 24 Hours of Le Mans, highlighted by a large brand presence, yielded major success for Dalmas, who raced alongside Pierluigi Martini and Joachim Winkelhock. Dalmas was involved in a battle for the race lead with the No. 3 Toyota from Sunday morning onwards, although the chase ended with a late puncture for the Toyota, allowing Dalmas to coast to his fourth Le Mans victory.

In the 2000 edition of the 24 Hours, Dalmas's car — the Team Oreca Reynard 2KQ-LM — retired after completing just one lap. Another retirement with Oreca followed in 2001, this time through an engine failure; Dalmas also contested a round of the European Le Mans Series at Donington that year. The 2002 24 Hours of Le Mans ended up being Dalmas's last professional motor race; piloting an Audi R8 for Team Goh, Dalmas finished seventh overall. Notably, Dalmas never had the same teammate twice during his 12 years of competing at Le Mans.

== Career after racing ==
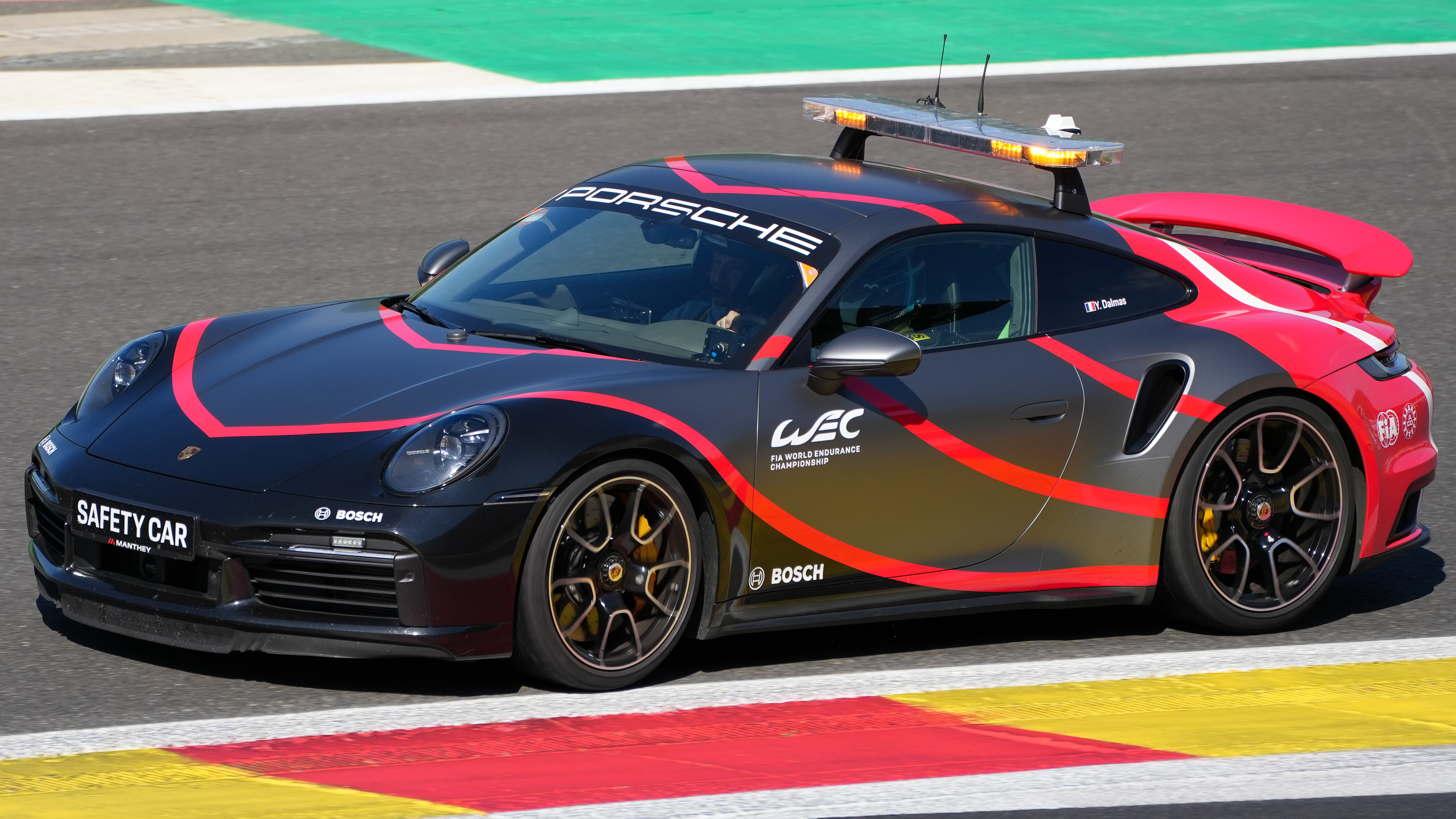
Dalmas driving the safety car at the 2024 6 Hours of Spa-Francorchamps

In the 2010s, Dalmas took up the role of special driving advisor and safety car driver for the FIA World Endurance Championship. As part of this role, he tested the Porsche 919 Hybrid and Toyota TS050 Hybrid LMP1 chassis during the 2016 post-season test. Dalmas was later named the Grand Marshal for the 2025 24 Hours of Le Mans. He stepped back from his roles as driving advisor and safety car driver at the end of the 2025 FIA World Endurance Championship season.

== Racing record ==
=== Complete International Formula 3000 results ===
(key) (Races in bold indicate pole position; races in italics indicate fastest lap.)

Year	Entrant	1	2	3	4	5	6	7	8	9	10	11	DC	Points
1986	Oreca Motorsport	SIL	VAL	PAU	SPA	IMO	MUG	PER	ÖST	BIR	BUG; Ret	JAR	NC	0
1987	Oreca Motorsport	SIL; Ret	**VAL**; Ret	SPA	PAU; 1	DON; 17	PER; Ret	BRH; 5	BIR; Ret	IMO; Ret	BUG; Ret	JAR; 1	5th	20

=== Complete Formula One results ===
(key)

Year	Entrant	Chassis	Engine	1	2	3	4	5	6	7	8	9	10	11	12	13	14	15	16	WDC	Pts
1987	Larrousse Calmels	Lola LC87	Ford Cosworth DFZ 3.5 V8	BRA	SMR	BEL	MON	DET	FRA	GBR	GER	HUN	AUT	ITA	POR	ESP	MEX; 9	JPN; 14	AUS; 5^{‡}	NC	0
1988	Larrousse Calmels	Lola LC88	Ford Cosworth DFZ 3.5 V8	BRA; Ret	SMR; 12	MON; 7	MEX; 9	CAN; DNQ	DET; 7	FRA; 13	GBR; 13	GER; 19	HUN; 9	BEL; Ret	ITA; Ret	POR; Ret	ESP; 11	JPN	AUS	NC	0
1989	Equipe Larrousse	Lola LC88C	Lamborghini 3512 3.5 V12	BRA; DNQ																NC	0
1989	Equipe Larrousse	Lola LC89	Lamborghini 3512 3.5 V12		SMR; DNS	MON; DNQ	MEX; DNQ	USA; DNQ	CAN; DNQ	FRA										NC	0
1989	Automobiles Gonfaronnaises Sportives	AGS JH23C	Ford Cosworth DFR 3.5 V8								GBR; DNPQ	GER; DNPQ	HUN; DNPQ							NC	0
1989	Automobiles Gonfaronnaises Sportives	AGS JH24	Ford Cosworth DFR 3.5 V8											BEL; DNPQ	ITA; DNPQ	POR; DNPQ	ESP; DNPQ	JPN; DNPQ	AUS; DNPQ	NC	0
1990	Automobiles Gonfaronnaises Sportives	AGS JH24	Ford Cosworth DFR 3.5 V8	USA; DNPQ	BRA; Ret	SMR; DNPQ														NC	0
1990	Automobiles Gonfaronnaises Sportives	AGS JH25	Ford Cosworth DFR 3.5 V8				MON; DNPQ	CAN; DNPQ	MEX; DNPQ	FRA; 17	GBR; DNPQ	GER; DNQ	HUN; DNQ	BEL; DNQ	ITA; NC	POR; Ret	ESP; 9	JPN; DNQ	AUS; DNQ	NC	0
1994	Tourtel Larrousse F1	Larrousse LH94	Ford HBF7/8 3.5 V8	BRA	PAC	SMR	MON	ESP	CAN	FRA	GBR	GER	HUN	BEL	ITA; Ret	POR; 14	EUR	JPN	AUS	NC	0

^{‡} Dalmas was ineligible to score points in 1987 as he was running in the second Larrousse, and the team had only entered one car for the championship

=== Complete World Sportscar Championship results ===
(key) (Races in bold indicate pole position) (Races in italics indicate fastest lap)

Year	Entrant	Class	Chassis	Engine	1	2	3	4	5	6	7	8	Pos.	Points
1991	Peugeot Talbot Sport	C1	Peugeot 905	Peugeot SA35 3.5 V10	SUZ; Ret	MNZ; Ret	SIL; Ret	LMS; Ret	NÜR; Ret				10th	40
1991	Peugeot Talbot Sport	C1	Peugeot 905B	Peugeot SA35 3.5 V10						**MAG**; 1	MEX; 1	AUT; Ret	10th	40
1992	Peugeot Talbot Sport	C1	Peugeot 905 Evo 1B	Peugeot SA35-A2 3.5 L V10	**MNZ**; 2	**SIL**; 1	LMS; 1	**DON**; 2	SUZ; 1	MAG; 5			1st	98

=== 24 Hours of Le Mans results ===
Year	Team	Co-Drivers	Car	Class	Laps	Pos.	Class Pos.
1991	(France) Peugeot Talbot Sport	(Finland) Keke Rosberg (France) Pierre-Henri Raphanel	Peugeot 905	C1	68	DNF	DNF
1992	(France) Peugeot Talbot Sport	(United Kingdom) Derek Warwick (United Kingdom) Mark Blundell	Peugeot 905 Evo 1B	C1	352	**1st**	**1st**
1993	(France) Peugeot Talbot Sport	(Belgium) Thierry Boutsen (Italy) Teo Fabi	Peugeot 905 Evo 1B	C1	374	**2nd**	**2nd**
1994	(Germany) Le Mans Porsche Team (Germany) Joest Racing	(United States) Hurley Haywood (Italy) Mauro Baldi	Dauer 962 Le Mans	GT1	344	**1st**	**1st**
1995	(United Kingdom) Kokusai Kaihatsu Racing	(Japan) Masanori Sekiya (Finland) JJ Lehto	McLaren F1 GTR	GT1	298	**1st**	**1st**
1996	(Germany) Porsche AG	(Austria) Karl Wendlinger (Canada) Scott Goodyear	Porsche 911 GT1	GT1	341	**3rd**	**2nd**
1997	(Germany) Porsche AG	(France) Emmanuel Collard (Germany) Ralf Kelleners	Porsche 911 GT1	GT1	327	DNF	DNF
1998	(Germany) Porsche AG (Germany) Joest Racing	(Italy) Michele Alboreto (Sweden) Stefan Johansson	Porsche LMP1-98	LMP1	107	DNF	DNF
1999	(Germany) BMW Motorsport	(Germany) Joachim Winkelhock (Italy) Pierluigi Martini	BMW V12 LMR	LMP	365	**1st**	**1st**
2000	(France) Mopar Team Oreca	(France) Nicolas Minassian (France) Jean-Philippe Belloc	Reynard 2KQ-LM-Mopar	LMP900	1	DNF	DNF
2001	(France) Viper Team Oreca	(France) Stéphane Sarrazin (France) Franck Montagny	Chrysler LMP	LMP900	126	DNF	DNF
2002	Audi Sport Japan Team Goh	(Japan) Hiroki Katoh (Japan) Seiji Ara	Audi R8	LMP900	358	7th	6th

=== Complete French Supertouring Championship results ===
(key)

Year	Team	Car	1	2	3	4	5	6	7	8	9	10	11	12	13	14	15	16	17	18	19	20	21	22	23	24	DC	Pts
1994	Peugeot Talbot Sport	Peugeot 405	NOG; 1; 2	NOG; 2; 3	MAG; 1; 2	MAG; 2; 3	PAU; 1; 4	PAU; 2; 2	DIJ; 1; 1	DIJ; 2; 1	CHA; 1; 3	CHA; 2; 5	VDV; 1; 5	VDV; 2; 5	CET; 1; 2	CET; 2; 7	LEC; 1; 7	LEC; 2; 6	ALB; 1; 6	ALB; 2; 7	BUG; 1 Ret	BUG; 2; 5	DML; 1; 4	DML; 2 Ret	LED; 1; 2	LED; 2; 1	4th	204

=== 12 Hours of Sebring results ===
Year	Team	Co-Drivers	Car	Class	Laps	Pos.	Class Pos.
1991	(United States) Team Scandia	(Sweden) Stefan Johansson (Spain) Fermín Vélez (United States) Andy Evans	Ferrari 333 SP	WSC	281	**1st**	**1st**

=== Deutsche Tourenwagen Meisterschaft ===
(key) (Races in bold indicate pole position) (Races in italics indicate fastest lap)

Deutsche Tourenwagen Meisterschaft results
Year	Team	Car	1	2	3	4	5	6	7	8	9	10	11	12	13	14	Pos.	Pts
1995	Joest Racing Opel	Opel Calibra V6 4x4	HOC; 1; 9	HOC; 2 Ret	AVU; 1; 11	AVU; 2; 10	NOR; 1; 18	NOR; 2 Ret	DIE; 1	DIE; 2	NÜR; 1 Ret	NÜR; 2; 16	ALE; 1; 9	ALE; 2; 6	HOC; 1; 8	HOC; 2; 7	19th	17

=== Complete International Touring Car Championship results ===
(key) (Races in bold indicate pole position) (Races in italics indicate fastest lap)

Year	Team	Car	1	2	3	4	5	6	7	8	9	10	11	12	13	14	15	16	17	18	19	20	21	22	23	24	25	26	Pos.	Points
1995	Joest Racing Opel	Opel Calibra V6 4x4	MUG; 1; 15	MUG; 2 Ret	HEL; 1 Ret	HEL; 2 Ret	DON; 1 Ret	DON; 2 DNS	EST; 1; 10	EST; 2; 17	MAG; 1; 7	MAG; 2; 4																	16th	15
1996	Joest Racing Opel	Opel Calibra V6 4x4	HOC; 1 Ret	HOC; 2; 12	NÜR; 1 Ret	NÜR; 2 DNS	EST; 1; 8	EST; 2 Ret	HEL; 1; 6	HEL; 2 Ret	NOR; 1 Ret	NOR; 2 DNS	DIE; 1; 12	DIE; 2; 7	SIL; 1; 9	SIL; 2; 7	NÜR; 1; 8	NÜR; 2; 7	MAG; 1 Ret	MAG; 2 DNS	MUG; 1; 10	MUG; 2; 10	HOC; 1; 18	HOC; 2 Ret	INT; 1; 8	INT; 2; 11	SUZ; 1; 12	SUZ; 2; 9	17th	33

=== Complete FIA GT Championship results ===
(key) (Races in bold indicate pole position) (Races in italics indicate fastest lap)

Year	Team	Class	Car	Engine	1	2	3	4	5	6	7	8	9	10	11	Pos.	Points
1997	Roock Racing	GT1	Porsche 911 GT1	Porsche 3.2 L Turbo Flat-6	HOC; 5	SIL; Ret	HEL									14th	19
1997	Porsche AG	GT1	Porsche 911 GT1	Porsche 3.2 L Turbo Flat-6				NÜR; 17	SPA; 3	A1R; 7	SUZ; 10	DON; 15	MUG; 3	SEB; 4	LAG; 2	14th	19
1998	Porsche AG	GT1	Porsche 911 GT1-98	Porsche 3.2 L Turbo Flat-6	OSC; 7	SIL	HOC; 6	DIJ; 2	HUN; 3	SUZ; 3	DON; 3	A1R; 3	HOM; 3	LAG; Ret		3rd	27

Sporting positions
Preceded by Jean-Pierre Hoursourigaray	Championnat de France Formule Renault Turbo; Champion; 1984	Succeeded by Éric Bernard
Preceded by Pierre-Henri Raphanel	Monaco Formula Three; Winner; 1986	Succeeded by Didier Artzet
Preceded by Pierre-Henri Raphanel	French Formula Three Championship; Champion; 1986	Succeeded by Jean Alesi
Preceded by Teo Fabi	World Sportscar Championship; Champion; 1992; With: Derek Warwick	Succeeded by None (Series ended)
Preceded by Volker Weidler; Johnny Herbert; Bertrand Gachot	Winner of the 24 Hours of Le Mans; 1992; With: Derek Warwick & Mark Blundell	Succeeded by Geoff Brabham; Christophe Bouchut; Éric Hélary
Preceded by Geoff Brabham; Christophe Bouchut; Éric Hélary	Winner of the 24 Hours of Le Mans; 1994; With: Hurley Haywood & Mauro Baldi	Succeeded by Yannick Dalmas; JJ Lehto; Masanori Sekiya
Preceded by Yannick Dalmas; Hurley Haywood; Mauro Baldi	Winner of the 24 Hours of Le Mans; 1995; With: JJ Lehto & Masanori Sekiya	Succeeded by Manuel Reuter; Davy Jones; Alexander Wurz
Preceded by Laurent Aïello; Allan McNish; Stéphane Ortelli	Winner of the 24 Hours of Le Mans; 1999; With: Pierluigi Martini & Joachim Winkelhock	Succeeded by Frank Biela; Tom Kristensen; Emanuele Pirro
