= Larrousse =

F1 team

- Full name: Larrousse & Calmels
- Base: Antony, Paris, France
- Founder(s): Gérard Larrousse; Didier Calmels
- Noted staff: Eric Broadley; Ralph Bellamy; Robin Herd; James Allison
- Noted drivers: (France) Érik Comas (France) Philippe Alliot (Japan) Aguri Suzuki (Japan) Ukyo Katayama

Formula One World Championship career
- First entry: 1987 San Marino Grand Prix
- Races entered: 127
- Constructors: Lola; Venturi; Larrousse
- Drivers' Championships: 0
- Race victories: 0
- Podiums: 1
- Pole positions: 0
- Fastest laps: 0
- Final entry: 1994 Australian Grand Prix

Larrousse as a Formula One chassis constructor
Formula One World Championship career
- Entrants: Larrousse
- First entry: 1993 South African Grand Prix
- Last entry: 1994 Australian Grand Prix
- Races entered: 32 (31 starts)
- Race victories: 0
- Constructors' Championships: 0
- Drivers' Championships: 0
- Podiums: 0
- Pole positions: 0
- Fastest laps: 0

Larrousse Formula One was a motorsports racing team founded in 1987 by Didier Calmels and former racer Gérard Larrousse, originally under the name Larrousse & Calmels. It was based in Antony, in the southern suburbs of Paris. It was renamed Larrousse after the departure of Calmels following his murder of his wife. The team competed in Formula One from 1987 to 1994 before succumbing to financial problems, scoring a best finish of third at the 1990 Japanese Grand Prix during this time.

== Formula One ==
=== Lola chassis (1987–1991) ===
Larrousse & Calmels commissioned a car from Lola and the result was the LC87 (internal Lola designation: T87/30), a car designed by Eric Broadley and Ralph Bellamy. The chassis was powered by a Cosworth DFZ V8 engine, and was entered in the undersubscribed normally aspirated class.

The team started out in 1987 with just one car for Philippe Alliot, with Yannick Dalmas joining the team in a second car the end of the year. By that time they had agreed to a three-year deal with Lola and Chris Murphy was recruited from Zakspeed to help Bellamy. The team then made a deal to run Lamborghini V12 engines in 1989.

In September 1988 the team hired former Renault and Lotus designer and engineer Gérard Ducarouge but in the spring of 1989, Calmels had to quit the team due to his imprisonment for the murder of his wife. As a result, the team became known simply as Larrousse.

For the 1989 season Alliot stayed on but Dalmas, who had been ill with Legionnaires' disease, was dropped after Canada and replaced by rookie French driver Éric Bernard and later by Michele Alboreto, who had recently left Tyrrell. At the end of the year, Larrousse sold 50% of his shares to the Japanese Espo Corporation, and Aguri Suzuki was hired to partner Bernard for the 1990 season. At the same time the team moved from Antony to new premises at Signes in the south of France near the Paul Ricard Circuit.

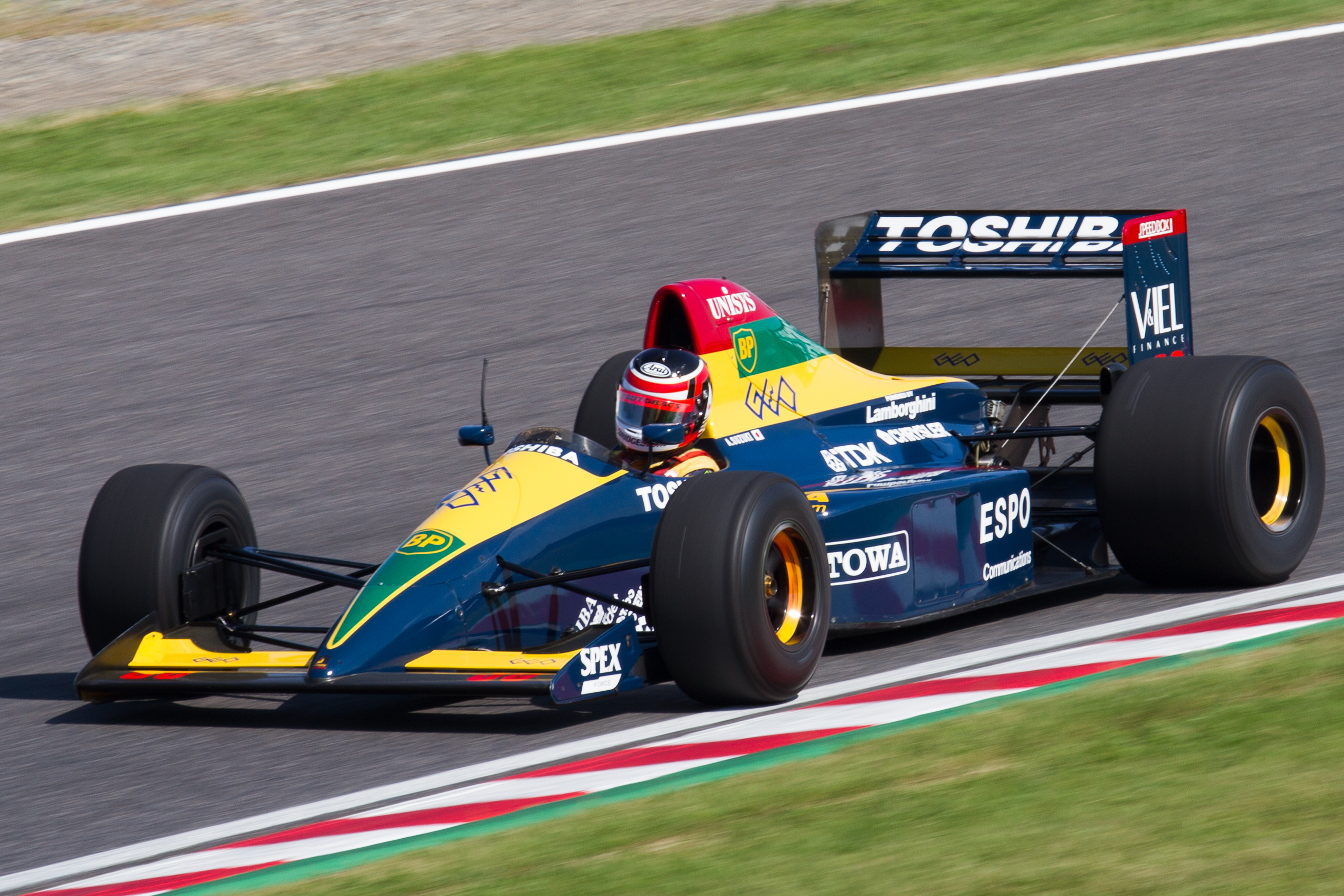
Aguri Suzuki took the Larrousse team's best result with third place at the 1990 Japanese Grand Prix. Here he demonstrates the car at the same venue 22 years later.

The 1990 season was Larrousse's best in Formula One, despite being forced to pre-qualify for the first half of the season. Suzuki managed to score the team's first, and ultimately only, podium, in front of his home fans at Suzuka in the Japanese Grand Prix, and the team finished sixth in the Constructors' Championship. Then things began to unravel when Lamborghini announced it was switching to Ligier. Of greater concern was the FIA considering taking away Larrousse's points because of an alleged "false declaration" about the design of the chassis. It transpired the team had made an honest mistake by registering the car as manufactured by themselves, when in fact it was designed and built by Lola in England. Although the team officially lost their points from 1990, the team kept the travel benefits and prize money associated with their championship finish and did not have to take part in pre-qualifying.

Larrousse signed an engine deal with Brian Hart for 1991 but early in the year Espo withdrew and the team struggled financially. Although difficult to set up, the car proved relatively quick and was usually a solid midfield runner before succumbing to the inevitable breakdown or driver error. Suzuki finished sixth in the first race of the season at Phoenix, and thereafter never made the chequered flag again. Bernard earned a single point for 6th at the Mexican Grand Prix. He crashed heavily in qualifying in Japan at Suzuka's hairpin, badly breaking his leg, and putting him out of F1 until he returned with Ligier in 1994. Belgian Bertrand Gachot returned for the final race in Australia (after being released from jail for assault on a London taxi driver).

As the funds began to run dry, the team sought protection from creditors with a French court in July. Japanese company Central Park bought into the team but soon afterwards Ducarouge left. Merger talks with AGS failed and the relationships with Lola and Hart were both ended without payment being made by Larrousse.

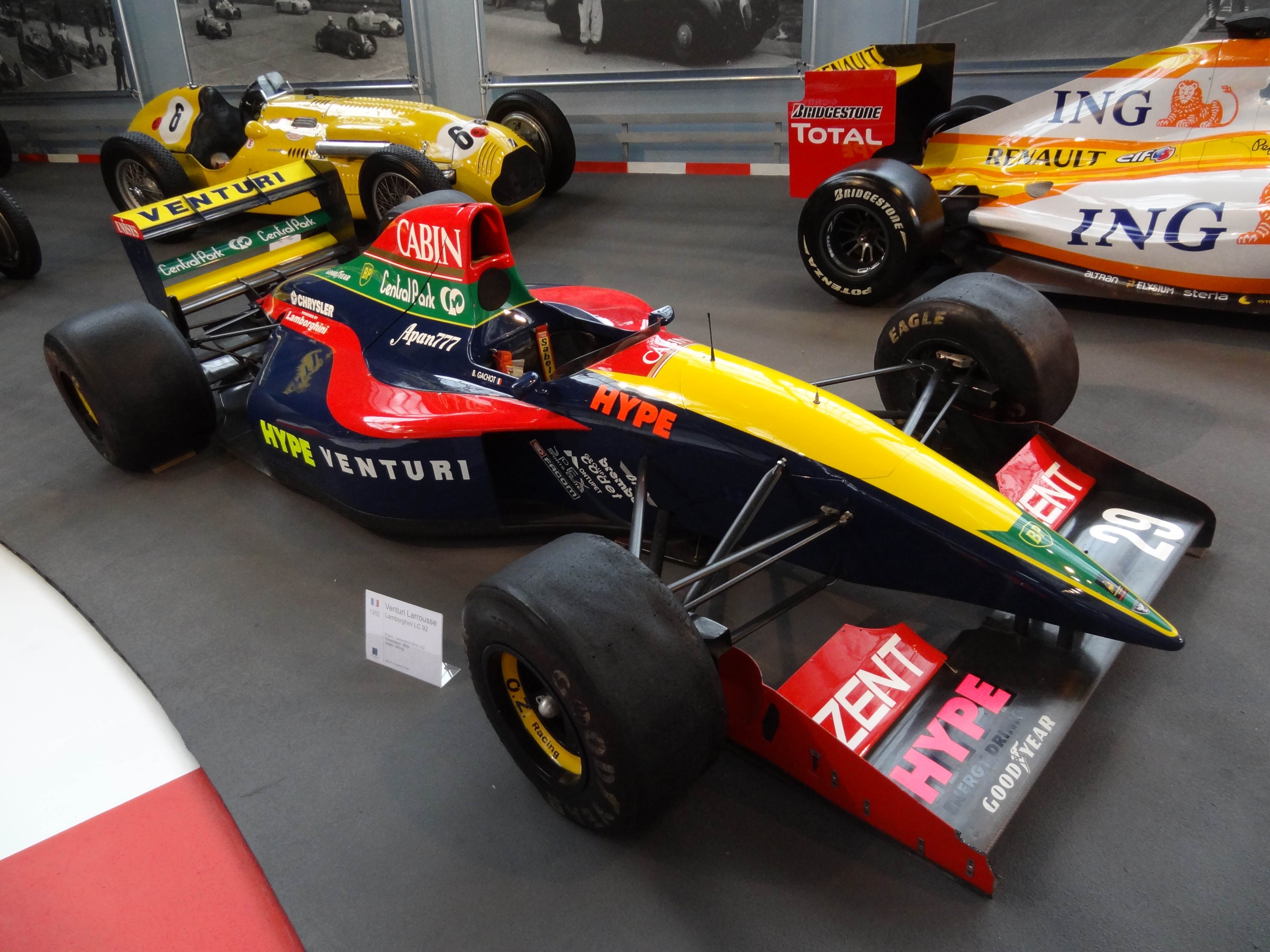
The 1992 Venturi-Larrousse LC92, currently on display in AutoWorld in Brussels

=== Venturi chassis (1992) ===
In the autumn of 1991 Gérard Larrousse signed up Robin Herd from Fondmetal for the construction of an F1 chassis and 65% of the team was sold to the Venturi car company. A new Lamborghini engine deal was agreed and Bertrand Gachot was kept on alongside Ukyo Katayama. In a season dominated by the Williams team, Gachot scored Larrousse's only point of the season at the Monaco Grand Prix (which also saw Katayama being bumped out of pre-qualifying by Andrea Moda Formula's Roberto Moreno). Gachot and Katayama collided twice in the season, in Canada and then Japan.

In September 1992 Venturi sold its shareholding to a group called Comstock, headed by German Rainer Walldorf. Walldorf, real name Klaus Walz, turned out to be wanted by the police of several European countries in connection with four murders. After escaping from a raid on his house in France by judicious use of a hand grenade, he was killed during a nine-hour gun battle with police in a German hotel.

=== Larrousse chassis (1993–1994) ===
In the team's first season using an in-house chassis, they had another disappointing season in 1993 when Gérard Larrousse funded drivers Philippe Alliot and Érik Comas, and the drivers could only manage two finishes in the points. Japanese pay driver Toshio Suzuki substituted for Alliot in hopes of increasing finances for the flyaway end of season races in Japan and Australia.

In 1994 Larrousse reorganized the team again. With Lamborghini pulling out and a failure to agree a deal to use Peugeot engines (which went to McLaren) he reverted to customer Ford HB engines, which were a substantially lesser predecessor to the Ford Zetec-R used by the works Benetton team. New partners were brought in, in the form of Swiss-based Fast Group SA, an organization headed by Ferrari dealer Michel Golay and former F1 racer Patrick Tambay. Sponsorship was found from the Belgian Alken-Maes brewery (with Rizla, SEITA and Zanussi filling the secondary sponsor roles), and the cars primarily ran in the colors of alcohol-free beer Tourtel, with occasional uses of the red and white colors of Kronenbourg in selected Grands Prix. At the wheel, Olivier Beretta replaced Alliot while Comas remained. Reliability was generally very poor throughout the season. Comas scored two 6th placings in the Pacific and German GPs – the latter race had only 8 finishers after a huge start-line accident. Beretta's best result was 7th at the German GP as well.

Despite these occasional flashes of speed, Comas and Beretta generally ran in the lower-midfield in what proved to be a tricky car powered by an aging engine. As the money ran short, however, pay-drivers replaced them, including former Larrousse veterans Alliot and Dalmas, as well as rookies Hideki Noda and Jean-Denis Délétraz.

During the season, the team played a role in Benetton Formula's cheating allegations. In May that year, the team was asked by refuelling rig device manufacturer Intertechnique to remove a fuel filter from their refuelling device; the team notified the FIA about the request the night before an FIA World Motor Sport Council meeting in September regarding Jos Verstappen's refuelling fire at German Grand Prix, where Benetton did the same without Intertechnique's approval.

=== Collapse ===
A new F1 car for 1995 was designed by Robin Herd, but was not built due to lack of funds. The team appeared on the entry list for the 1995 season with Érik Comas returning as one of its drivers, but needed to merge with an organisation with an available F1 chassis to survive. The two options were Lola, which was unrealistic as the British manufacturer had never been paid by Larrousse for the chassis it had produced for the 1990 and 1991 seasons; and French International Formula 3000 team DAMS, which was in possession of a Reynard-designed F1 chassis with which it hoped to enter the sport in the future. However, Gérard Larrousse and DAMS owner Jean-Paul Driot failed to come to an agreement over the winter of 1994–1995. Driot subsequently announced that DAMS would not enter F1 in 1995. Larrousse consequently ordered the previous year's chassis, the LH94, to be upgraded to the new technical regulations as a temporary solution, whilst he waited to see if the French government would give the team financial support, as way of compensation for the fact that the so-called "Evin's Law" had banned possible revenue from tobacco and alcohol sponsorship. In the meantime he sold the majority stake in the Larrousse outfit to compatriots Laurent Barlesi and Jean Messaoudi, who had attempted but failed to enter their own planned Junior F1 Team for the coming season and had the budget necessary to save Larrousse from imminent collapse. During this period, the team's potential driver line-up was in flux, with Comas, Emmanuel Collard, Elton Julian, Éric Hélary, Christophe Bouchut and Éric Bernard all in the frame.

It was then announced within two weeks of the season-opening Brazilian Grand Prix that Larrousse would not receive any government money. The team elected to miss the first two long-haul races of the season, reasoning that it was better to focus on building a new car than upgrading the old one (a solution that would be very uncompetitive), and hoping that the sport's governing body, Fédération Internationale de l'Automobile (FIA) would waive the standard fines levied against teams that missed Grands Prix in the interest of keeping the team in F1. However, the team's situation remained extremely difficult: Ford refused to supply the team engines without payment; Gérard Larrousse's former partners, Patrick Tambay and Michel Golay, took legal action against him in France; and a planned sponsorship deal with Petronas was dependent on the team taking part in a Grand Prix. Prior to the San Marino Grand Prix, Larrousse announced his team's withdrawal from F1, blaming others for failing to produce promised funding. Despite announcing that he intended to return to the sport for 1996, his involvement in several lawsuits as a result of the team's collapse made this impossible. The failure of Larrousse was a blow to French motorsport, which in addition to the problems caused by the government's ban on tobacco and alcohol sponsorship (the Loi Evin), had recently lost the AGS team in 1991 and seen the takeover of the Ligier team by foreigners Flavio Briatore and Tom Walkinshaw in 1994.

== Racing record ==
=== Complete Formula One results ===
(key) (results in bold indicate pole position)

Year	Chassis	Engine(s)	Tyres	Drivers	1	2	3	4	5	6	7	8	9	10	11	12	13	14	15	16	Points	WCC
Lola
1987	LC87	Ford Cosworth DFZ 3.5 V8	G		BRA	SMR	BEL	MON	DET	FRA	GBR	GER	HUN	AUT	ITA	POR	ESP	MEX	JPN	AUS	3	9th
1987	LC87	Ford Cosworth DFZ 3.5 V8	G	(France) Yannick Dalmas														9	14	5*	3	9th
1987	LC87	Ford Cosworth DFZ 3.5 V8	G	(France) Philippe Alliot		10	8	Ret	Ret	Ret	Ret	6	Ret	12	Ret	Ret	6	6	Ret	Ret	3	9th
1988	LC88	Ford Cosworth DFZ 3.5 V8	G		BRA	SMR	MON	MEX	CAN	DET	FRA	GBR	GER	HUN	BEL	ITA	POR	ESP	JPN	AUS	0	NC
1988	LC88	Ford Cosworth DFZ 3.5 V8	G	(France) Yannick Dalmas	Ret	12	7	9	DNQ	7	13	13	19	9	Ret	Ret	Ret	11			0	NC
1988	LC88	Ford Cosworth DFZ 3.5 V8	G	(Japan) Aguri Suzuki															16		0	NC
1988	LC88	Ford Cosworth DFZ 3.5 V8	G	(France) Pierre-Henri Raphanel																DNQ	0	NC
1988	LC88	Ford Cosworth DFZ 3.5 V8	G	(France) Philippe Alliot	Ret	17	Ret	Ret	10	Ret	Ret	14	Ret	12	9	Ret	Ret	14	9	10	0	NC
1989	LC88B; LC89	Lamborghini 3512 3.5 V12	G		BRA	SMR	MON	MEX	USA	CAN	FRA	GBR	GER	HUN	BEL	ITA	POR	ESP	JPN	AUS	1	15th
1989	LC88B; LC89	Lamborghini 3512 3.5 V12	G	(France) Yannick Dalmas	DNQ	DNS	DNQ	DNQ	DNQ	DNQ											1	15th
1989	LC88B; LC89	Lamborghini 3512 3.5 V12	G	(France) Éric Bernard							11	Ret									1	15th
1989	LC88B; LC89	Lamborghini 3512 3.5 V12	G	(Italy) Michele Alboreto									Ret	Ret	Ret	Ret	11	DNPQ	DNQ	DNPQ	1	15th
1989	LC88B; LC89	Lamborghini 3512 3.5 V12	G	(France) Philippe Alliot	12	Ret	Ret	Ret	Ret	Ret	Ret	Ret	Ret	DNPQ	16	Ret	9	6	Ret	Ret	1	15th
1990	LC89B; LC90	Lamborghini 3512 3.5 V12	G		USA	BRA	SMR	MON	CAN	MEX	FRA	GBR	GER	HUN	BEL	ITA	POR	ESP	JPN	AUS	11	6th^
1990	LC89B; LC90	Lamborghini 3512 3.5 V12	G	(France) Éric Bernard	8	Ret	13	6	9	Ret	8	4	Ret	6	9	Ret	Ret	Ret	Ret	Ret	11	6th^
1990	LC89B; LC90	Lamborghini 3512 3.5 V12	G	(Japan) Aguri Suzuki	Ret	Ret	Ret	Ret	12	Ret	7	6	Ret	Ret	Ret	Ret	14	6	3	Ret	11	6th^
1991	LC91	Ford Cosworth DFR 3.5 V8	G		USA	BRA	SMR	MON	CAN	MEX	FRA	GBR	GER	HUN	BEL	ITA	POR	ESP	JPN	AUS	2	11th
1991	LC91	Ford Cosworth DFR 3.5 V8	G	(France) Éric Bernard	Ret	Ret	Ret	9	Ret	6	Ret	Ret	Ret	Ret	Ret	Ret	DNQ	Ret	DNQ		2	11th
1991	LC91	Ford Cosworth DFR 3.5 V8	G	(Belgium) Bertrand Gachot																DNQ	2	11th
1991	LC91	Ford Cosworth DFR 3.5 V8	G	(Japan) Aguri Suzuki	6	DNS	Ret	Ret	Ret	Ret	Ret	Ret	Ret	Ret	DNQ	DNQ	Ret	DNQ	Ret	DNQ	2	11th
Venturi
1992	LC92	Lamborghini 3512 3.5 V12	G		RSA	MEX	BRA	ESP	SMR	MON	CAN	FRA	GBR	GER	HUN	BEL	ITA	POR	JPN	AUS	1	11th
1992	LC92	Lamborghini 3512 3.5 V12	G	(France) Bertrand Gachot	Ret	11	Ret	Ret	Ret	6	DSQ	Ret	Ret	14	Ret	18	Ret	Ret	Ret	Ret	1	11th
1992	LC92	Lamborghini 3512 3.5 V12	G	(Japan) Ukyo Katayama	12	12	9	DNQ	Ret	DNPQ	Ret	Ret	Ret	Ret	Ret	17	9	Ret	11	Ret	1	11th
Larrousse
1993	LH93	Lamborghini 3512 3.5 V12	G		RSA	BRA	EUR	SMR	ESP	MON	CAN	FRA	GBR	GER	HUN	BEL	ITA	POR	JPN	AUS	3	10th
1993	LH93	Lamborghini 3512 3.5 V12	G	(France) Philippe Alliot	Ret	7	Ret	5	Ret	12	Ret	9	11	12	8	12	9	10			3	10th
1993	LH93	Lamborghini 3512 3.5 V12	G	(Japan) Toshio Suzuki															12	14	3	10th
1993	LH93	Lamborghini 3512 3.5 V12	G	(France) Érik Comas	Ret	10	9	Ret	9	Ret	8	16	Ret	Ret	Ret	Ret	6	11	Ret	12	3	10th
1994	LH94	Ford HBF7/8 3.5 V8	G		BRA	PAC	SMR	MON	ESP	CAN	FRA	GBR	GER	HUN	BEL	ITA	POR	EUR	JPN	AUS	2	11th
1994	LH94	Ford HBF7/8 3.5 V8	G	(Monaco) Olivier Beretta	Ret	Ret	Ret	8	DNS	Ret	Ret	14	7	9							2	11th
1994	LH94	Ford HBF7/8 3.5 V8	G	(France) Philippe Alliot											Ret						2	11th
1994	LH94	Ford HBF7/8 3.5 V8	G	(France) Yannick Dalmas												Ret	14				2	11th
1994	LH94	Ford HBF7/8 3.5 V8	G	(Japan) Hideki Noda														Ret	Ret	Ret	2	11th
1994	LH94	Ford HBF7/8 3.5 V8	G	(France) Érik Comas	9	6	Ret	10	Ret	Ret	11	Ret	6	8	Ret	8	Ret	Ret	9		2	11th
1994	LH94	Ford HBF7/8 3.5 V8	G	(Switzerland) Jean-Denis Délétraz																Ret	2	11th

* Ineligible for points.
^ Results published in 1991 FIA Yearbook of Automobile Sport credited the 1990 results to "Larrousse" rather than "Lola"
