= Lola LC88 =

Formula One car

Lola LC88 Lola LC88C
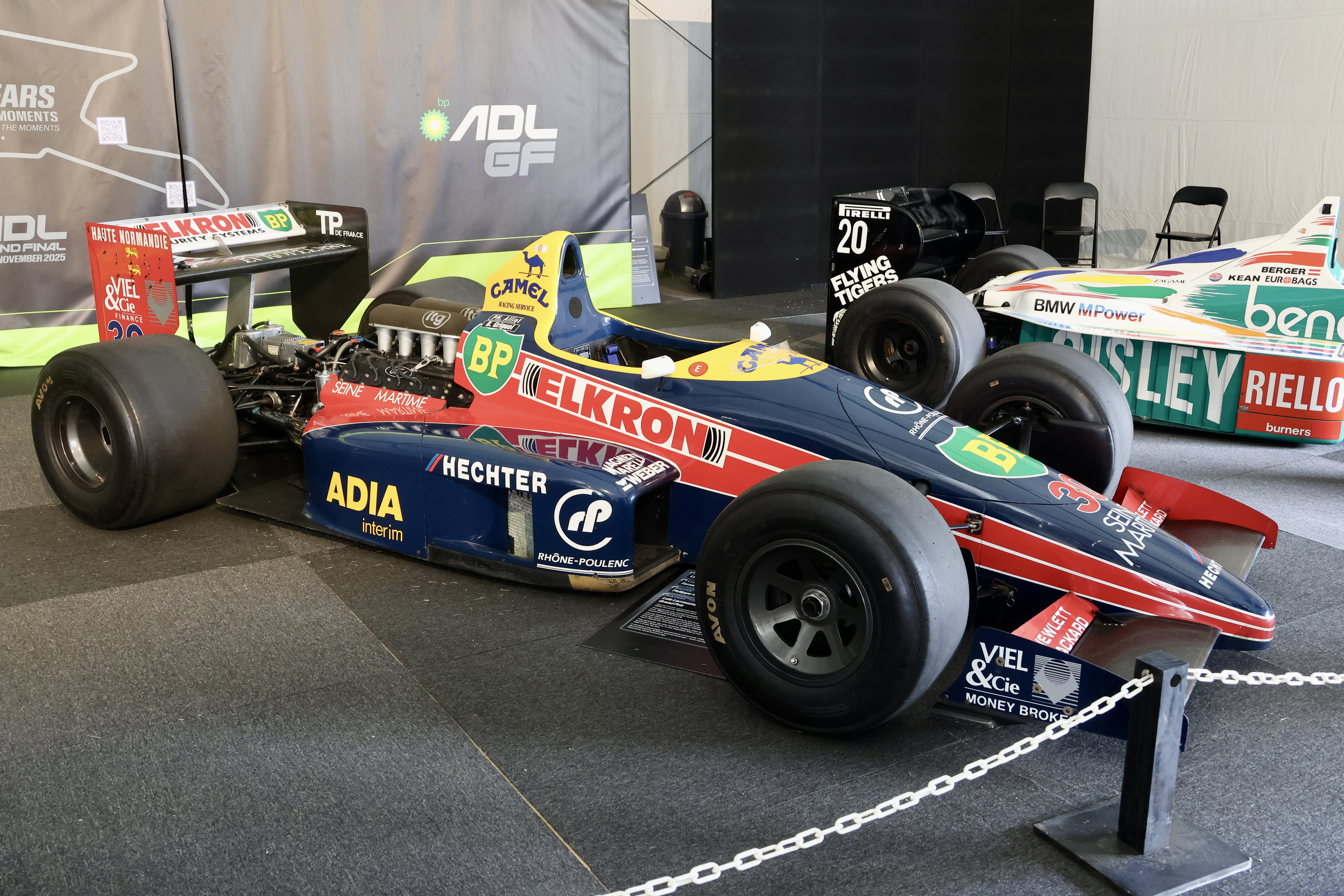
- Lola LC88 pictured in 2025
- Category: Formula One
- Constructor: Lola Cars
- Designers: Eric Broadley (Technical Director); Chris Murphy (Chief Designer); Hans Fouche (Aerodynamicist)
- Predecessor: Lola LC87
- Successor: Lola LC89

Technical specifications
- Chassis: Carbon fibre monocoque
- Suspension (front): Double wishbones, pullrods
- Suspension (rear): Double wishbones, pullrods
- Engine: 1988: Ford Cosworth DFZ, 3,494 cc (213.2 cu in), naturally aspirated 90° V8. Longitudinal, mid-mounted. 1989: Lamborghini LE3512, 3,493 cc (213.2 cu in), naturally aspirated, 80° V12. Longitudinal, mid-mounted.
- Transmission: Hewland FGC 5 Speed
- Weight: 515kg
- Fuel: BP
- Lubricants: BP
- Tyres: Goodyear

Competition history
- Notable entrants: Larrousse & Calmels
- Notable drivers: (France) Yannick Dalmas (Japan) Aguri Suzuki (France) Pierre-Henri Raphanel (France) Philippe Alliot
- Debut: 1988 Brazilian Grand Prix
Races	Wins	Poles	F/Laps
17	0	0	0

The Lola LC88 is a Formula One car that the Larrousse team used to compete in the 1988 and (in upgraded LC88C form) one race in the 1989 Formula One season. It was an evolution of the previous LC87 model, and had major changes to the front suspension.

== Development ==
The LC88 was designed by Eric Broadley, Chris Murphy and Hans Fouche, and a total of five cars were built. It was powered by the Ford Cosworth DFZ in 1988 and Lamborghini 3512 engines in 1989 (the first Formula One car with this engine).

== Race history ==
=== 1988 ===
At the LC88's debut event, the 1988 Brazilian Grand Prix, French drivers Philippe Alliot and Yannick Dalmas qualified their cars 16th and 17th respectively, but both retired from the race. Dalmas's engine cut out on lap 33 when he was running ninth, and Alliot pulled in with a broken engine mounting eight laps later, also while running ninth. The nose and front suspension were revised for the next race at San Marino, where Alliot qualified 15th with Dalmas 19th. Dalmas finished 12th, two laps down, and Alliot finished 17th, three laps down after spending time in the pits with a suspension problem. Both drivers complained of a lack of grip. Dalmas subsequently tested the car in France and further suspension modifications were made, and at the following race in Monaco, he qualified 21st with Alliot up in 13th. There had also been a major change at Lola prior to Monaco with Australian designer and senior engineer Ralph Bellamy leaving. Dalmas raced well and was running sixth on the last lap with a chance of a World Championship point, but was passed by Riccardo Patrese before the chequered flag, and finished seventh. Alliot had run as high as ninth before baulking Patrese's attempt to lap him at Mirabeau; the subsequent collision left Alliot's car heavily damaged after contact with the tyre wall.

The LC88's ruggedness was demonstrated at the next race in Mexico, when Alliot had a massive accident in practice. He was exiting the 240 km/h (149 mph) Peraltada Curve leading to the main straight when he drifted onto the outside kerb. This pitched the car directly across the track and into the pit wall, before it somersaulted back across the track and finally landed upside down on the grass opposite the pits. Alliot qualified 13th and was cleared to race the next day, and the car was rebuilt as the team had no spare car after the Monaco accident. Dalmas qualified 22nd. On race day, Alliot stalled on the grid and started from the back, and retired on lap 1 with a cracked suspension upright. Dalmas climbed to ninth by the finish, three laps down. The team's problems with damaged cars continued in Canada, where Dalmas crashed heavily in practice and was unable to qualify for the race in the fully repaired spare car that Alliot had used in Mexico. Alliot qualified 17th and climbed to seventh before running out of fuel on lap 67. He was classified tenth.

Temporarily with only two chassis at the team's disposal, Alliot qualified 14th at the Detroit Grand Prix with Dalmas down in 25th. Alliot suffered from brake problems during the race and eventually retired on lap 47 with transmission failure. Dalmas finished seventh of the eight finishers, two laps down. In France the two drivers were evenly matched, with Alliot qualifying 18th and Dalmas 19th. Dalmas finished 13th, two laps down, but Alliot retired on lap 47 with engine management issues after running as high as 12th. At the British Grand Prix, Alliot and Dalmas qualified down in 22nd and 23rd respectively and finished 14th and 13th, with both drivers again complaining about a lack of grip. The team struggled again in Germany, with Alliot qualifying 20th and Dalmas 21st. On a wet track, Alliot switched to slick tyres on lap 9, then crashed while being lapped by Ayrton Senna. Dalmas pitted three times with various problems and was ultimately classified 19th, three laps down.

At the Hungarian Grand Prix, Dalmas had another big practice accident, this time colliding with Oscar Larrauri's EuroBrun, but managed to qualify the spare car in 17th. Alliot qualified 20th and finished 12th, four laps down, but Dalmas won a battle with Stefano Modena and Gabriele Tarquini to finish ninth, three laps down. In Belgium, with minor developments made to the cars, Alliot qualified 16th and finished 11th, one lap down, while Dalmas qualified 23rd and retired with a blown engine on lap 10. There followed two double retirements, in Italy and Portugal, with Alliot retiring at Monza through engine problems and Dalmas with gearbox failure, after they had qualified 20th and 25th respectively. At Estoril, Dalmas qualified 15th but retired with a snapped alternator belt, while Alliot started 20th and was out by lap 8 with engine failure.

The Spanish Grand Prix marked little improvement as Alliot crashed again in practice and qualified 12th in the spare car. Dalmas started 16th and finished 11th, one lap down, while Alliot managed 14th, three laps down, after having to pit for a new wheel. Before the next race in Japan, Dalmas was diagnosed with Legionellosis which caused him to miss the final two races. Aguri Suzuki stepped in at short notice and qualified 20th despite having very little experience with the car; Alliot was one place ahead in 19th. Alliot managed to equal his best finish of the season in ninth, one lap down, and Suzuki finished 16th, three laps down. Pierre-Henri Raphanel took Dalmas's place at the season-ending Australian Grand Prix, but failed to qualify, while Alliot started 24th. In a disappointing end to the season for the team, he raced at the back of the field before running out of fuel; he was classified tenth, five laps behind the winner.

=== 1989 ===
Dalmas returned for the 1989 season, with Alliot still in place as his team-mate. The team used the revised LC88C with a Lamborghini V12 engine at the season-opening Brazilian Grand Prix but the car was unwieldy. Dalmas failed to qualify and Alliot qualified 26th and finished 12th. The car was replaced by the Lola LC89 by the 1989 San Marino Grand Prix, and so had failed to score any World Championship points during its time in Formula One.

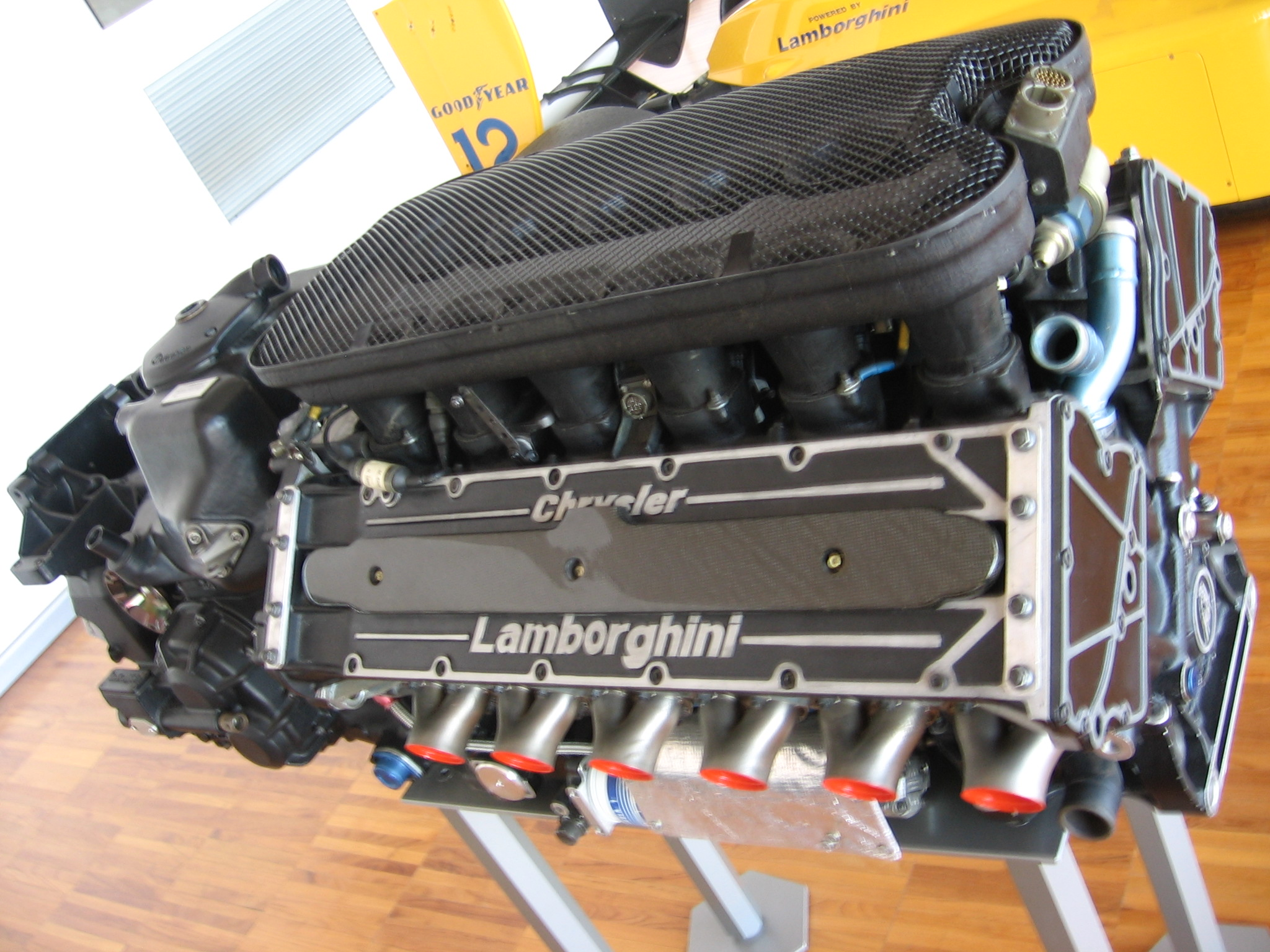
Lamborghini's V12 engine as used by the Larrousse team in 1989.

== After Formula One ==
English Formula Libre driver Rob Cox bought two of the LC88s at the end of the 1988 season. In one of them, he won the 1989 Design Fireplaces Single-Seater Championship and competed in the 1989 Castle Combe Formula Libre Championship. He sold the other one to pop record producer Mike Stock of Stock Aitken Waterman.

The car holds the outright lap record at Lydden Hill Race Circuit.

One of the LC88Cs is on display at the Manoir Automobile car museum in Loheac, France.

Chassis HU-02 that was driven by Philippe Alliot is now housed in Adelaide, South Australia where the car last competed in 1988.

== Complete Formula One results ==
(key)

Year	Entrant	Chassis	Engine(s)	Tyres	Drivers	1	2	3	4	5	6	7	8	9	10	11	12	13	14	15	16	Points	WCC
1988	Larrousse & Calmels	LC88	Ford Cosworth DFZ; V8	G		BRA	SMR	MON	MEX	CAN	DET	FRA	GBR	GER	HUN	BEL	ITA	POR	ESP	JPN	AUS	0	NC
1988	Larrousse & Calmels	LC88	Ford Cosworth DFZ; V8	G	Yannick Dalmas	Ret	12	7	9	DNQ	7	13	13	19	9	Ret	Ret	Ret	11			0	NC
1988	Larrousse & Calmels	LC88	Ford Cosworth DFZ; V8	G	Aguri Suzuki															16		0	NC
1988	Larrousse & Calmels	LC88	Ford Cosworth DFZ; V8	G	Pierre-Henri Raphanel																DNQ	0	NC
1988	Larrousse & Calmels	LC88	Ford Cosworth DFZ; V8	G	Philippe Alliot	Ret	17	Ret	Ret	10	Ret	Ret	14	Ret	12	9	Ret	Ret	14	9	10	0	NC
1989	Larrousse & Calmels	LC88C	Lamborghini 3512; V12	G		BRA	SMR	MON	MEX	USA	CAN	FRA	GBR	GER	HUN	BEL	ITA	EUR	ESP	JPN	AUS	1*	15th
1989	Larrousse & Calmels	LC88C	Lamborghini 3512; V12	G	Yannick Dalmas	DNQ																1*	15th
1989	Larrousse & Calmels	LC88C	Lamborghini 3512; V12	G	Philippe Alliot	12																1*	15th

* Point scored using the LC89.
