= Lola LC87 =

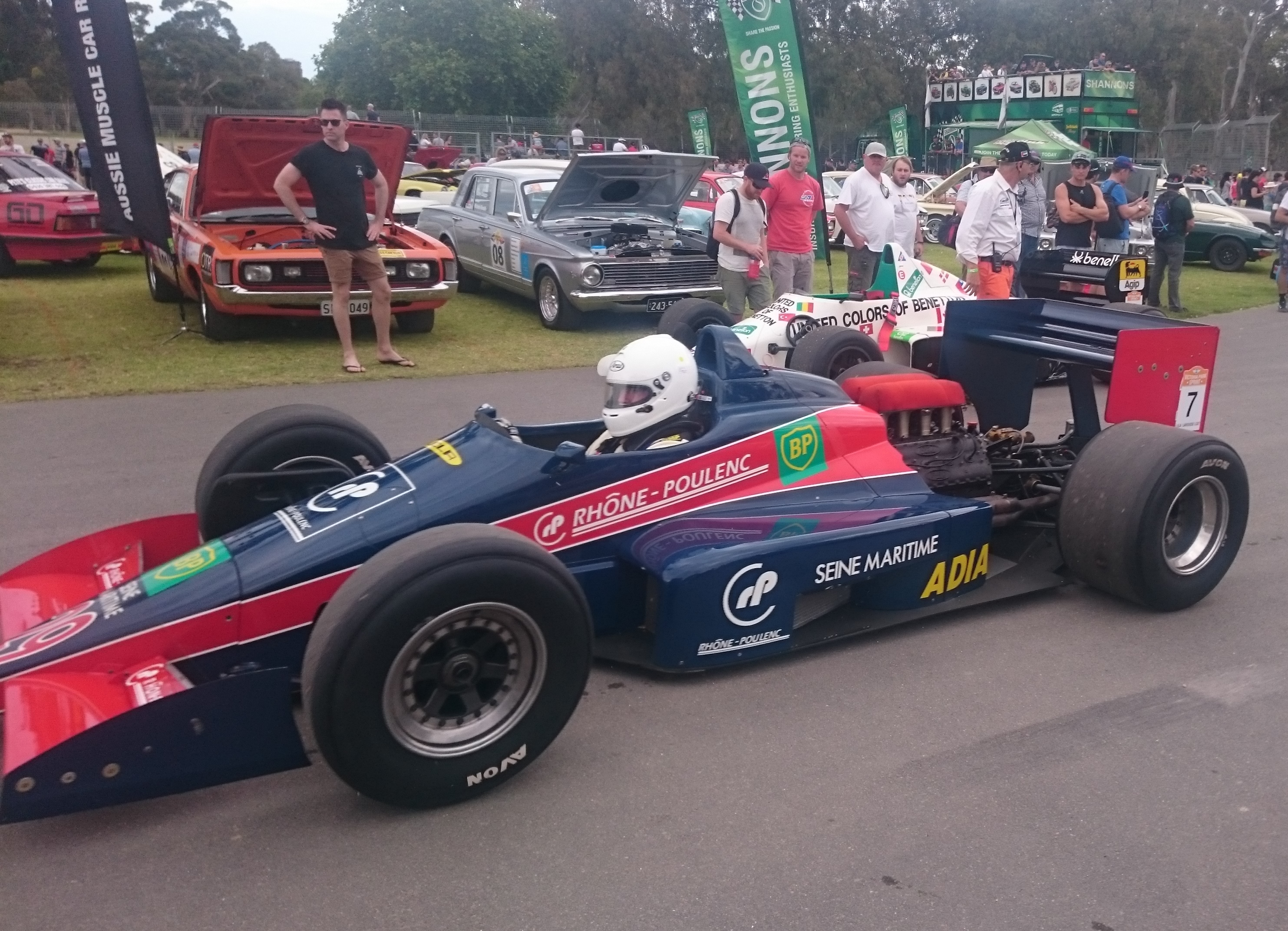
- Lola LC87, pictured in 2018
- Category: Formula One
- Constructor: Lola Cars
- Designers: Eric Broadley (Technical Director); Ralph Bellamy (Chief Designer, Senior Engineer); Geoff Goddard (Cosworth Race Engine Designer)
- Successor: Lola LC88

Technical specifications
- Chassis: Carbon fibre monocoque
- Suspension (front): Double wishbones, pullrods
- Suspension (rear): Double wishbones, pullrods
- Engine: Ford Cosworth DFZ, 3,494 cc (213.2 cu in), naturally aspirated 90° V8. Longitudinal, mid-mounted.
- Transmission: Hewland FGB 5-speed
- Fuel: BP
- Lubricants: BP
- Tyres: Goodyear

Competition history
- Notable entrants: Larrousse & Calmels
- Notable drivers: (France) Philippe Alliot (France) Yannick Dalmas
- Debut: 1987 San Marino Grand Prix
Races	Wins	Poles	F/Laps
15	0	0	0

The Lola LC87 is a Formula One car that the Larrousse team used to compete in 1987, the team's first season in Formula One.

== Development ==
Larrousse & Calmels was formed in 1987 by former racer and motorsport manager Gérard Larrousse and the French businessman Didier Calmels. They commissioned a car from Lola, and the result was the LC87, designed by Eric Broadley and Ralph Bellamy. It was closely related to Lola's then-current Formula 3000 car, and was powered by the 3.5-litre Ford Cosworth DFZ engine, through a Hewland FGB gearbox. The LC87 was an overweight car, but weight-saving measures were planned to take place throughout the season.

As a non-turbocharged car, Larrousse and the LC87 were eligible for a subsidiary championship for normally-aspirated cars, the Colin Chapman Trophy. The team initially ran a single car for Philippe Alliot, but a second car appeared towards the end of the season, to be driven by another Frenchman, debutant Yannick Dalmas. Alliot was eligible for the drivers' equivalent of the Colin Chapman Trophy, the Jim Clark Cup.

== Race history ==
=== 1987 ===
Missing the first race of the season, the LC87 debuted at the 1987 San Marino Grand Prix. Qualifying 22nd on the grid, and second-fastest of the normally-aspirated cars, Alliot finished the race in tenth position despite being delayed when Pascal Fabre spun. At the second race in Belgium, Alliot qualified 20th and finished eighth, and first in his class, leaving him and Lola second in the normally-aspirated class championship tables. The team subsequently made weight-saving developments to the car, reducing it to 512 kg. However, the car's first retirement came in the next race in Monaco, where Alliot qualified 18th, but retired on lap 43 of the race with engine failure while running 14th. At the next race in Detroit, Alliot started 20th and improved to 11th on race day before crashing into a wall while trying to pass René Arnoux. The retirements dropped Lola to third in the Colin Chapman Trophy, and Alliot to fourth in the Jim Clark Cup.

In France, Alliot qualified in 23rd position and ran as high as 12th in the race before retiring with ignition failure on lap 58. The team's poor luck continued at the British Grand Prix, where Alliot was forced off the circuit at 160 mph by Adrian Campos during Friday practice, although he was able to qualify 21st, the fastest of the normally-aspirated cars. Improving to 17th place by lap 5 of the race, he had retired by lap 8 with transmission failure. However, their fortunes improved when, after qualifying 21st at the German Grand Prix, again the fastest non-turbocharged car, Alliot finished sixth despite an engine management problem, thus scoring Larrousse's first World Championship point.

Alliot qualified 15th in Hungary, his best qualifying performance so far that season, but flat-spotted a tyre on lap 2 of the race. The consequent vibration caused a crack in a suspension wishbone, which eventually broke on lap 49, and Alliot had to retire from 13th place. In Austria, Alliot started 22nd, again the fastest in his class. The start of the race was chaotic, with the first start aborted due to a multiple accident at the rear of the field, which Alliot avoided, but he was caught up in a worse incident at the second start when Nigel Mansell suffered a slipping clutch, and twelve cars were damaged trying to avoid the British driver's Williams. Alliot took the third start in the spare LC87, and finished 12th, three laps down.

At the following race, the Italian Grand Prix, he started 23rd and ran as high as 13th in the race, but retired on lap 38 after a collision with Philippe Streiff. In Portugal, Alliot started 19th, again the fastest in his class, but was again involved in a multiple accident at the start when he was hit by René Arnoux and Christian Danner. He took to the spare car and climbed to 13th but retired on lap 32 with fuel pump failure, dropping him to fifth in the Jim Clark Cup, and Lola to fourth in the Colin Chapman Trophy. At the Spanish Grand Prix, Alliot qualified 17th and enjoyed one of his best races of the season, winning his class and taking sixth place overall, and another World Championship point, after several cars retired from the race.

From the Mexican Grand Prix onwards, Larrousse entered a second car for Yannick Dalmas who qualified 23rd, outpacing his more experienced team-mate Alliot, who started the race 24th. The team enjoyed their best race of the season so far as Alliot claimed another class win and World Championship point with a sixth-place finish. Dalmas finished ninth, taking Lola to second in the Colin Chapman Trophy. In the Jim Clark Cup, Alliot moved up to third with Dalmas sixth. They did not fare as well in Japan however, as although Alliot and Dalmas started 18th and 22nd, Alliot was pushed into the wall during a multiple startline pile-up involving Arnoux and Michele Alboreto, and Dalmas suffered engine troubles on the way to finishing 14th, four laps adrift of the winner.

At the final race of the season, the Australian Grand Prix, Alliot qualified 17th with Dalmas 21st, but Dalmas achieved the team's highest finish of the season with fifth place. However, as Dalmas had not participated in sufficient races during the season, he was unable to claim the two World Championship points. Alliot retired with electronic problems.

Larrousse-Lola closed the 1987 season with three World Championship points, all scored by Alliot, and ninth place in the Constructors' Championship. In the non-turbocharged Colin Chapman Trophy, Larrousse-Lola finished second behind Tyrrell. In the Jim Clark Cup, Alliot finished third with Dalmas sixth.

The LC87 was replaced in readiness for the 1988 season by the Lola LC88, although this car was less successful and failed to score a World Championship point.

== Complete Formula One results ==
(key)

Year	Entrant	Engine(s)	Tyres	Drivers	1	2	3	4	5	6	7	8	9	10	11	12	13	14	15	16	Points	WCC
1987	Larrousse & Calmels	Cosworth DFZ; V8 NA	G		BRA	SMR	BEL	MON	DET	FRA	GBR	GER	HUN	AUT	ITA	POR	ESP	MEX	JPN	AUS	3	9th
1987	Larrousse & Calmels	Cosworth DFZ; V8 NA	G	Philippe Alliot		10	8	Ret	Ret	Ret	Ret	6	Ret	12	Ret	Ret	6	6	Ret	Ret	3	9th
1987	Larrousse & Calmels	Cosworth DFZ; V8 NA	G	Yannick Dalmas														9	14	5*	3	9th

* Dalmas was ineligible to score points in Australia as the team had only entered one car for the full season

== Colin Chapman Trophy (for constructors of cars equipped with naturally aspirated engines) ==
(key)

Year	Entrant	Engine(s)	Tyres	Drivers	1	2	3	4	5	6	7	8	9	10	11	12	13	14	15	16	Points	CCT
1987	Larrousse & Calmels	Cosworth DFZ; V8 NA	G		BRA	SMR	BEL	MON	DET	FRA	GBR	GER	HUN	AUT	ITA	POR	ESP	MEX	JPN	AUS	43	2nd
1987	Larrousse & Calmels	Cosworth DFZ; V8 NA	G	Philippe Alliot		2	1	Ret	Ret	Ret	Ret	3	Ret	2	Ret	Ret	1	1	Ret	Ret	43	2nd
1987	Larrousse & Calmels	Cosworth DFZ; V8 NA	G	Yannick Dalmas														4	3	2	43	2nd
