= Philippe Alliot =

French racing driver (born 1954)

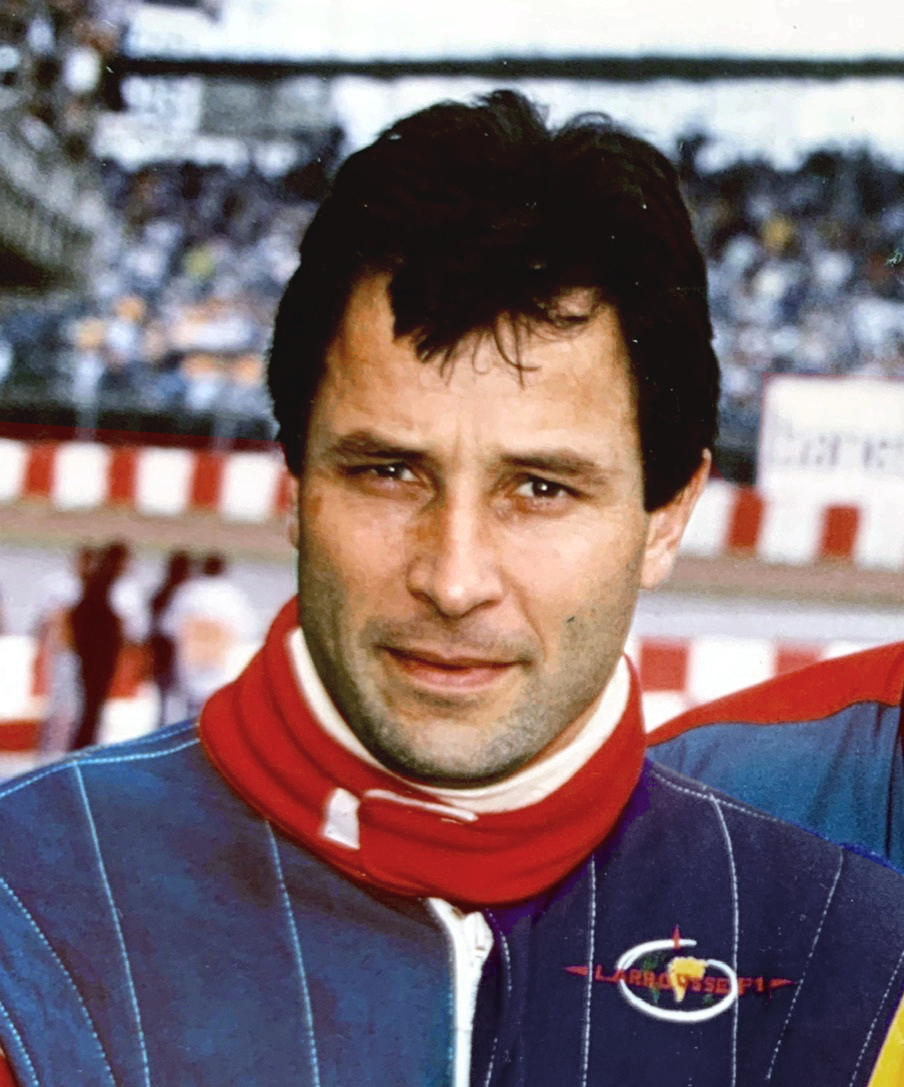
- Alliot in 1993
- Born: Philippe René Gabriel Alliot; 27 July 1954 (age 72); Voves, Eure-et-Loir, France

Formula One World Championship career
- Nationality: (France) French
- Active years: 1984–1990, 1993–1994
- Team(s): RAM, Ligier, Larrousse, McLaren
- Entries: 116 (109 starts)
- Championships: 0
- Wins: 0
- Podiums: 0
- Career points: 7
- Pole positions: 0
- Fastest laps: 0
- First entry: 1984 Brazilian Grand Prix
- Last entry: 1994 Belgian Grand Prix

World Sportscar Championship career
- Years active: 1981–1983, 1986, 1991–1992
- Teams: BMW, Ford, Rondeau, Porsche, Peugeot
- Starts: 21
- Championships: 0
- Wins: 3
- Podiums: 8
- Poles: 3
- Fastest laps: 3

24 Hours of Le Mans career
- Years: 1981, 1983, 1986, 1990–1993, 1995–1996, 2003
- Teams: BMW, Porsche, Peugeot, Gulf, Courage
- Best finish: 3rd (1983, 1992, 1993)
- Class wins: 0

Philippe René Gabriel Alliot (born 27 July 1954) is a French former racing driver and broadcaster, who competed in Formula One from 1984 to 1990 and from 1993 to 1994.

Born and raised in Voves, Alliot initially studied political science before dropping out of university to pursue his racing career. He competed at 116 Formula One Grands Prix across nine seasons for RAM, Ligier, Larrousse and McLaren. Alliot also competed intermittently in the World Sportscar Championship, winning three races from 21 starts and finishing third in the standings in 1991 and 1992 with Peugeot. He also entered ten editions of the 24 Hours of Le Mans, finishing third in 1983, 1992 and 1993.

== Early life and career ==
Philippe René Gabriel Alliot was born on 27 July 1954 in Voves, Eure-et-Loir, France. Alliot initially enrolled as a political science student, before dropping out to pursue a racing career at the Motul Racing School at the Circuit de Nogaro.

Prior to his career in Formula One, Alliot competed during 1976 and 1977 in Formule Renault, and won the championship in 1978, in the BP Racing team. With said team, he also won the French Formula Renault championship and went on to French Formula Three. He finished third in his first race and moved to the European Formula 3 Championship in 1980. By 1983, he moved to Formula Two but hit the headlines that year when he finished third in the Le Mans 24 Hours with Michael and Mario Andretti in a Kremer Porsche.

== Formula One ==
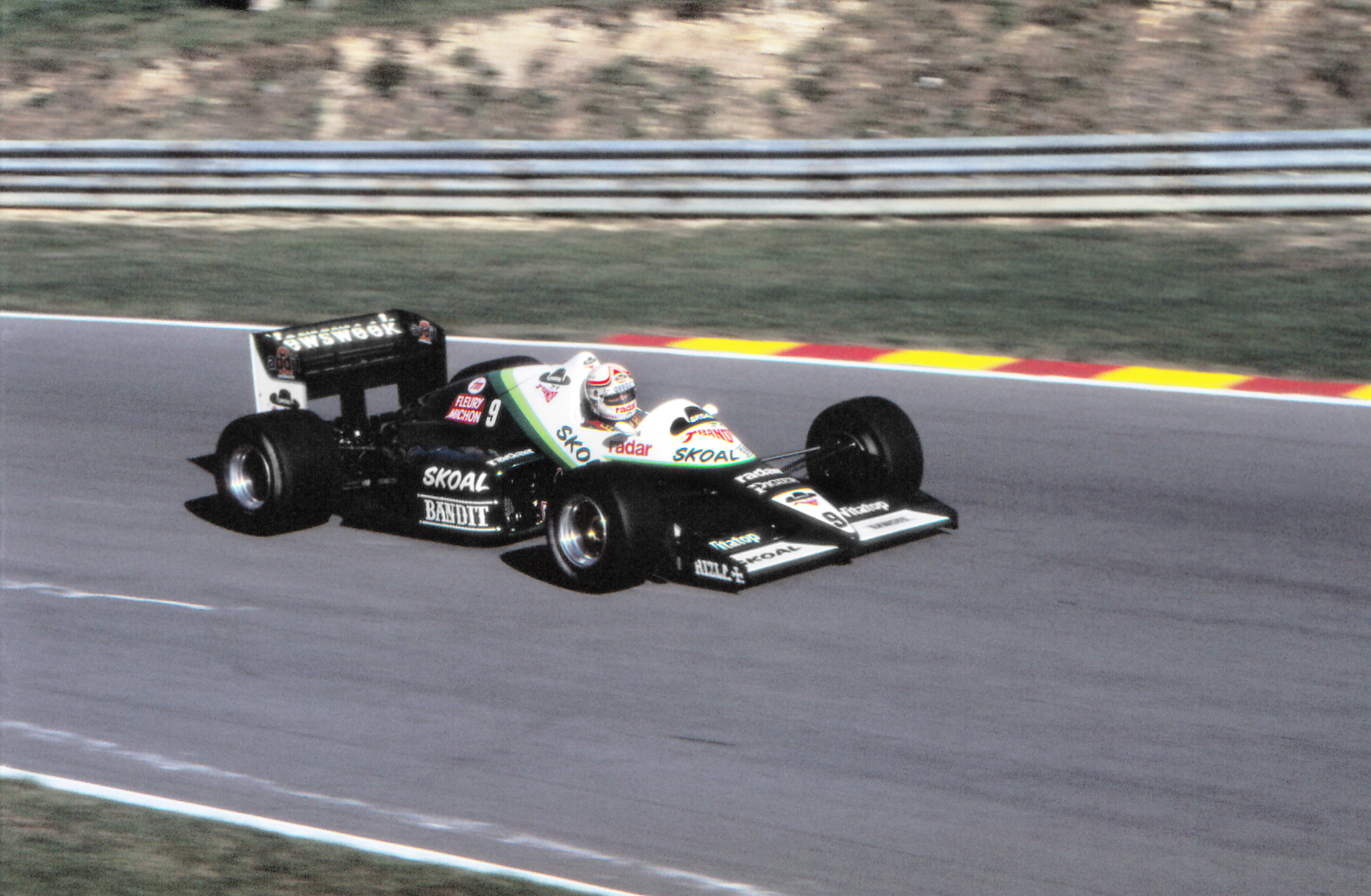
Alliot during practice for the 1985 European Grand Prix

In 1984 Alliot joined the Skoal Bandit RAM F1 team, but did not enjoy much in the way of success. After Jacques Laffite was injured at the 1986 British Grand Prix, Alliot took his place at Ligier, where he showed an improvement. He moved to Larrousse for 1987, but returned to Ligier in 1990, gaining a reputation for accidents. He has the record of most race starts without any lead lap finish.

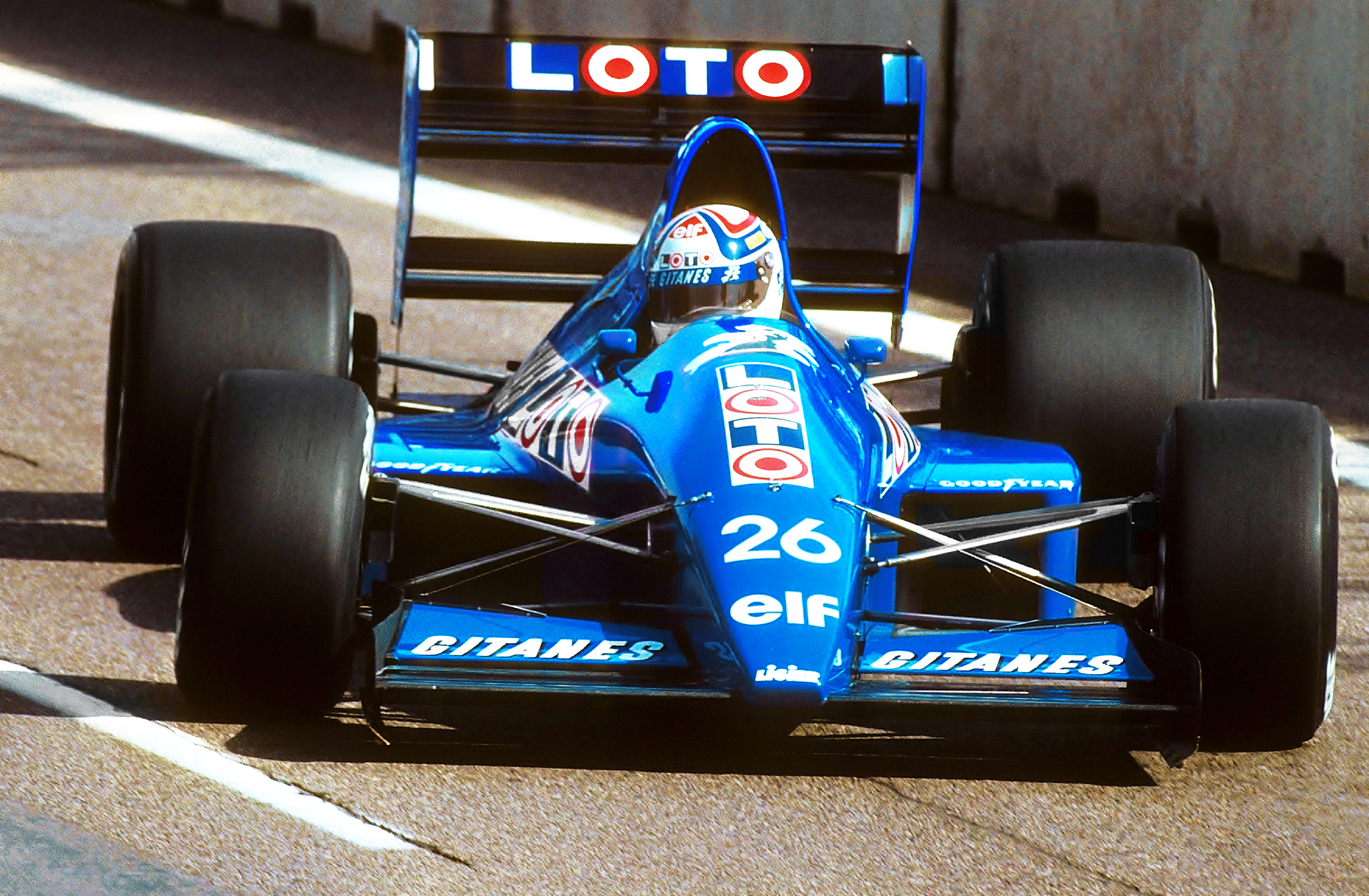
Alliot driving the Ligier JS33B at the 1990 United States Grand Prix

== Sportscars ==
Alliot left F1 for sports car racing in the early 1990s and enjoyed considerable success with the Peugeot team, run by Jean Todt. This included third-place finishes at the 1992 and 1993 24 Hours of Le Mans.

== Return to Formula One ==
Alliot made another attempt at F1 with Larrousse in 1993, achieving the best finish of his F1 career, fifth, at the San Marino Grand Prix. For 1994, Alliot was actually out of a drive in Formula One until Peugeot insisted that McLaren, who they were supplying V10 engines for, take him on as a test/reserve driver (largely against the wishes of team boss Ron Dennis who only relented because of Peugeot's insistence). This role led to a race at the 1994 Hungarian Grand Prix for the team as a replacement for Mika Häkkinen, while he was suspended. Qualifying 14th, he retired from the race itself. Alliot then replaced Olivier Beretta at Larrousse for the following race, the Belgian Grand Prix. Starting from 19th on the grid, he retired with engine failure and this proved to be his last race in F1. Alliot left Formula One as the driver with the most race starts who had never achieved at least one of a podium finish, a pole position, or a fastest lap.

== Later life ==
After announcing his retirement from Formula One in 1995, Alliot decided to try a career in politics, also did some TV commentary and competed in ice racing and the Paris–Dakar Rally, but ended running his own GT racing team.

== Racing record ==
=== Career summary ===
Season	Series	Team	Races	Wins	Poles	F/Laps	Podiums	Points	Position
1976	Formule Renault Nationale	Écurie Armagnac Bigorre	13	0	0	0	0	21	11th
1977	Formule Renault Nationale	Écurie Armagnac Bigorre	8	1	1	4	3	33	9th
1978	Formule Renault Nationale	BP Racing Team	14	5	3	4	9	144	**1st**
1979	French Formula Three		?	?	?	?	?	18	**3rd**
1979	European Formula Three	Kores Racing	2	0	0	0	0	0	NC
1980	European Formula Three	Automobiles Martini	13	0	1	3	6	39	5th
1980	German Formula Three	Automobiles Martini	2	0	0	1	0	0	NC†
1980	French Formula Three	Ecurie Elf	2	2	0	1	2	42	7th
1981	European Formula Three	Automobiles Martini	14	2	1	0	5	41	**3rd**
1981	World Sportscar Championship	Ecurie Elf	2	0	0	0	0	6	309th
1981	French Formula Three	Ecurie Elf	1	1	0	0	1	0	NC
1981	German Formula Three	Ecurie Elf	1	0	0	0	0	0	NC†
1982	European Formula Three	Automobiles Martini	9	1	0	0	2	25	6th
1982	World Sportscar Championship	Otis-Rondeau	2	0	0	0	0	0	NC
1982	German Formula Three	Total	1	0	0	0	0	0	NC†
1983	European Formula Two	BMW France	10	0	1	1	0	4	12th
1983	World Sportscar Championship	Porsche Kremer Racing	2	0	0	0	1	12	25th
1983	24 Hours of Le Mans	Porsche Kremer Racing	1	0	0	0	1	N/A	**3rd**
1984	Formula One	Skoal Bandit Formula 1 Team	13	0	0	0	0	0	NC
1985	Formula One	Skoal Bandit Formula 1 Team	13	0	0	0	0	0	NC
1985	European Formula 3000	BS Automotive	1	0	0	0	0	1	19th
1986	Formula One	Équipe Ligier	7	0	0	0	0	1	18th
1986	International Formula 3000	Oreca	6	1	0	1	1	9	9th
1986	24 Hours of Le Mans	John Fitzpatrick Racing	1	0	0	0	0	N/A	10th
1987	Formula One	Larrousse Calmels	15	0	0	0	0	3	17th
1988	Formula One	Larrousse Calmels	16	0	0	0	0	0	NC
1989	Formula One	Larrousse Calmels/Equipe Larrousse	15	0	0	0	0	1	26th
1990	Formula One	Ligier Gitanes	14	0	0	0	0	0	NC
1990	24 Hours of Le Mans	Porsche Kremer Racing	1	0	0	0	0	N/A	16th
1991	World Sportscar Championship	Peugeot Talbot Sport	8	1	1	1	3	69	**3rd**
1991	24 Hours of Le Mans	Peugeot Talbot Sport	1	0	0	0	0	N/A	DNF
1992	World Sportscar Championship	Peugeot Talbot Sport	6	2	2	2	4	64	**3rd**
1992	24 Hours of Le Mans	Peugeot Talbot Sport	1	0	1	0	1	N/A	**3rd**
1993	Formula One	Equipe Larrousse	14	0	0	0	0	2	17th
1993	24 Hours of Le Mans	Peugeot Talbot Sport	1	0	1	0	1	N/A	**3rd**
1994	Formula One	Marlboro McLaren Peugeot	1	0	0	0	0	0	NC
1994	Formula One	Tourtel Larrousse F1	1	0	0	0	0	0	NC
1995	French Supertouring Championship	Peugeot Esso	18	0	2	0	1	53	6th
1995	BPR Global GT Series	Toyota Team Tom's	1	0	0	0	0	0	NC
1995	24 Hours of Le Mans	GTC Gulf Racing	1	0	0	0	0	N/A	DNF
1996	24 Hours of Le Mans	Courage Compétition	1	0	0	0	0	N/A	DNF
1999	FFSA GT Championship	MTO Mirabeau Compétition	1	0	0	0	0	0	NC
2000	FIA GT Championship – N-GT	JMB Competition	3	0	0	0	0	0	NC
2001	FFSA GT Championship	JMB Competition	11	4	0	0	7	258	4th
2002	FIA GT Championship	Force One Racing	6	0	0	0	0	0	NC
2003	FIA GT Championship	Force One Racing Festina	7	0	1	0	1	9	42nd
2003	FFSA GT Championship	Force One Racing Festina	6	3	1	1	3	125	11th
2003	24 Hours of Le Mans	Courage Compétition	1	0	0	0	0	N/A	DNF
2004	FIA GT Championship	Force One Racing	1	0	0	0	0	5.5	41st
2005	FFSA GT Championship	Force One Racing	2	0	0	0	0	1	39th
2006	FFSA GT Championship	PSI Expérience	8	1	1	1	3	113	8th

^{†} As Alliot was a guest driver, he was ineligible for championship points.

=== Complete European Formula Three results ===
(key) (Races in bold indicate pole position) (Races in italics indicate fastest lap)

Year	Entrant	Chassis	Engine	1	2	3	4	5	6	7	8	9	10	11	12	13	14	15	Pos.	Points
1980	Automobiles Martini	Martini MK31	Toyota	NÜR; 2	ÖST; 3	ZOL; 2	MAG; 2	ZAN; 19	LCA; DNQ	**MUG**; 8	MNZ; 4	MIS; 4	KNU; 6	SIL; Ret	JAR; 3	**KAS**; 11	ZOL; 2		5th	39
1981	Automobiles Martini	Martini MK34	Alfa Romeo	VAL; 5	**NÜR**; 2	DON; 5	ÖST; 3	ZOL; 4	MAG; 1	**LCA**; 1	ZAN; 5	SIL; 9	CET; Ret	MIS; 10	KNU; Ret	JAR; 3	**IMO**; Ret	MUG	**3rd**	**41**
1982	Automobiles Martini	Martini MK37	Alfa Romeo	MUG; DNQ	**NÜR**; 6	DON	ZOL; 8	MAG; 4	ÖST; 4	ZAN; 5	SIL; DNS	MNZ	PER	LCA; 1	KNU; Ret	NOG; 4	JAR; 3	KAS	6th	25

=== 24 Hours of Le Mans results ===
Year	Team	Co-Drivers	Car	Class	Laps	Pos.	Class Pos.
1981	BMW Italie-France	(Venezuela) Johnny Cecotto (France) Bernard Darniche	BMW M1 Gr. 5	Gr. 5 SP +2.0	278	16th	**3rd**
1983	(Germany) Porsche Kremer Racing	(United States) Mario Andretti (United States) Michael Andretti	Porsche 956	C	364	**3rd**	**3rd**
1986	(United Kingdom) John Fitzpatrick Racing	(Spain) Paco Romero (France) Michel Trollé	Porsche 962C	C1	312	10th	8th
1990	(Germany) Porsche Kremer Racing	(France) Patrick Gonin (Belgium) Bernard de Dryver	Porsche 962CK6	C1	319	16th	16th
1991	(France) Peugeot Talbot Sport	(Italy) Mauro Baldi (France) Jean-Pierre Jabouille	Peugeot 905	C1	22	DNF	DNF
1992	(France) Peugeot Talbot Sport	(Italy) Mauro Baldi (France) Jean-Pierre Jabouille	Peugeot 905 Evo 1B	C1	345	**3rd**	**3rd**
1993	(France) Peugeot Talbot Sport	(Italy) Mauro Baldi (France) Jean-Pierre Jabouille	Peugeot 905 Evo 1B	C1	367	**3rd**	**3rd**
1995	(United Kingdom) GTC Gulf Racing	(France) Pierre-Henri Raphanel (United Kingdom) Lindsay Owen-Jones	McLaren F1 GTR	GT1	77	DNF	DNF
1996	(France) Courage Compétition	(France) Didier Cottaz (France) Jérôme Policand	Courage C36-Porsche	LMP1	215	DNF	DNF
2003	(France) Courage Compétition	(France) David Hallyday (Sweden) Carl Rosenblad	Courage C65-JPX	LMP675	41	DNF	DNF

=== Complete European Formula Two Championship results ===
(key) (Races in bold indicate pole position; races in italics indicate fastest lap)

Year	Entrant	Chassis	Engine	1	2	3	4	5	6	7	8	9	10	11	12	Pos.	Pts
1983	BMW France	Martini 001	BMW	SIL; Ret	THR; 5	HOC; 8	NÜR; DNS	VAL	PAU; Ret	JAR; Ret	DON; Ret	**MIS**; Ret	PER; 12	ZOL; 5	MUG; Ret	12th	4

=== Complete International Formula 3000 results ===
(key) (Races in bold indicate pole position) (Races in italics indicate fastest lap)

Year	Entrant	Chassis	Engine	1	2	3	4	5	6	7	8	9	10	11	12	Pos.	Pts
1985	BS Automotive	March 85B	Ford Cosworth	SIL	THR	EST	NÜR	VAL	PAU	SPA	DIJ; 6	PER	ÖST	ZAN	DON	19th	1
1986	Oreca	March 86B	Ford Cosworth	SIL; Ret	VAL; 8	PAU; Ret	**SPA**; 1	IMO; 13	MUG; Ret	PER	ÖST	BIR	BUG	JAR		9th	9

=== Complete Formula One World Championship results ===
(key)

Year	Entrant	Chassis	Engine	1	2	3	4	5	6	7	8	9	10	11	12	13	14	15	16	WDC	Points
1984	Skoal Bandit Formula 1 Team	RAM 02	Hart Straight-4	BRA; Ret	RSA; Ret	BEL; DNQ	SMR; Ret	FRA; Ret	MON; DNQ	CAN; 10	DET; Ret	DAL; DNS	GBR; Ret	GER; Ret	AUT; 11	NED; 10	ITA; Ret	EUR; Ret	POR; Ret	NC	0
1985	Skoal Bandit Formula 1 Team	RAM 03	Hart Straight-4	BRA; 9	POR; Ret	SMR; Ret	MON; DNQ	CAN; Ret	DET; Ret	FRA; Ret	GBR; Ret	GER; Ret	AUT; Ret	NED; Ret	ITA; Ret	BEL; Ret	EUR; Ret	RSA	AUS	NC	0
1986	Équipe Ligier	Ligier JS27	Renault V6	BRA	ESP	SMR	MON	BEL	CAN	DET	FRA	GBR	GER; Ret	HUN; 9	AUT; Ret	ITA; Ret	POR; Ret	MEX; 6	AUS; 8	18th	1
1987	Larrousse Calmels	Lola LC87	Cosworth V8	BRA	SMR; 10	BEL; 8	MON; Ret	DET; Ret	FRA; Ret	GBR; Ret	GER; 6	HUN; Ret	AUT; 12	ITA; Ret	POR; Ret	ESP; 6	MEX; 6	JPN; Ret	AUS; Ret	17th	3
1988	Larrousse Calmels	Lola LC88	Cosworth V8	BRA; Ret	SMR; 17	MON; Ret	MEX; Ret	CAN; 10	DET; Ret	FRA; Ret	GBR; 14	GER; Ret	HUN; 12	BEL; 9	ITA; Ret	POR; Ret	ESP; 14	JPN; 9	AUS; 10	NC	0
1989	Larrousse Calmels	Lola LC88C	Lamborghini V12	BRA; 12																26th	1
1989	Equipe Larrousse	Lola LC89	Lamborghini V12		SMR; Ret	MON; Ret	MEX; NC	USA; Ret	CAN; Ret	FRA; Ret	GBR; Ret	GER; Ret	HUN; DNPQ	BEL; 16	ITA; Ret	POR; 9	ESP; 6	JPN; Ret	AUS; Ret	26th	1
1990	Ligier Gitanes	Ligier JS33B	Cosworth V8	USA; EX	BRA; 12	SMR; 9	MON; Ret	CAN; Ret	MEX; 18	FRA; 9	GBR; 13	GER; DSQ	HUN; 14	BEL; DNQ	ITA; 13	POR; Ret	ESP; Ret	JPN; 10	AUS; 11	NC	0
1993	Equipe Larrousse	Larrousse LH93	Lamborghini V12	RSA; Ret	BRA; 7	EUR; Ret	SMR; 5	ESP; Ret	MON; 12	CAN; Ret	FRA; 9	GBR; 11	GER; 12	HUN; 8	BEL; 12	ITA; 9	POR; 10	JPN	AUS	17th	2
1994	Marlboro McLaren Peugeot	McLaren MP4/9	Peugeot V10	BRA	PAC	SMR	MON	ESP	CAN	FRA	GBR	GER	HUN; Ret							NC	0
1994	Tourtel Larrousse F1	Larrousse LH94	Ford V8											BEL; Ret	ITA	POR	EUR	JPN	AUS	NC	0

=== Complete French Supertouring Championship results ===
(key)

Year	Team	Car	1	2	3	4	5	6	7	8	9	10	11	12	13	14	15	16	17	18	DC	Pts
1995	Peugeot Esso	Peugeot 405	NOG; 1; 6	NOG; 2 Ret	DIJ; 1; 5	DIJ; 2; 6	PAU; 1; 5	PAU; 2; 10	CHA; 1; 7	CHA; 2; 5	VDV; 1; 6	VDV; 2; 5	CET; 1; 3	CET; 2; 5	LEC; 1 Ret	LEC; 2; 4	ALB; 1 Ret	ALB; 2; 7	DML; 1; 6	DML; 2; 4	6th	53

Sporting positions
Preceded by Joël Gouhier	Championnat de France Formule Renault; Champion; 1978	Succeeded by Alain Ferté
