= Ralph Bellamy (racing car designer) =

Australian engineer

- Born: 4 February 1938 (age 88); Eastwood, New South Wales, Australia
- Occupations: Motorsport engineer and designer
- Known for: Formula One designer. (Brabham, Ensign, Fittipaldi, Lola, McLaren)

Ralph Bellamy (born 4 February 1938) is an Australian retired motor racing car designer and engineer. He worked for various teams such as Brabham, Ensign, Fittipaldi, Lola and McLaren.

Known in international circles as "Captain Kangaroo", Bellamy first came to Europe in the 1960s to try to achieve a successful career in motor racing. Once in Europe, Bellamy first came to be noticed for his work with Gordon Coppuck on the McLaren M14 in 1970. Bellamy then became chief designer of the 1971 McLaren M19A and following this the McLaren M21.

He then moved from McLaren to Brabham where Bernie Ecclestone was in charge and he redesigned the Brabham BT34 into the BT37. Bellamy then lost his position to Gordon Murray and moved to Lotus where he was one of the team designing the Lotus 78. Next he joined Fittipaldi Automotive in 1979 before moving to Ensign for the 1980 season.

From 1983, Bellamy spent time in Indycar design and Formula 2 design. In 1986 he was working at Lola, designing Formula 3000 chassis and the Lola F1 design, the Lola LC87, that was used by the new French Larrousse team in 1987.

Bellamy retired in 1993 moving back to Australia. However he was still involved in motorsport designing V8 Supercars for Tony Longhurst Racing.
