= 1987 Mexican Grand Prix =

- Race 14 of 16 in the 1987 Formula One World Championship

Race details
- Date: 18 October 1987
- Official name: Gran Premio de México
- Location: Autódromo Hermanos Rodríguez, Mexico City, Mexico
- Course: Permanent circuit
- Course length: 4.421 km (2.747 miles)
- Distance: 63 laps, 278.523 km (173.066 miles)
- Weather: Sunny and hot

Pole position
| Driver | (United Kingdom) Nigel Mansell | Williams-Honda |
- Time: 1:18.383

Fastest lap
| Driver | (Brazil) Nelson Piquet | Williams-Honda |
- Time: 1:19.132 on lap 57

Podium
| First | (United Kingdom) Nigel Mansell | Williams-Honda |
| Second | (Brazil) Nelson Piquet | Williams-Honda |
| Third | (Italy) Riccardo Patrese | Brabham-BMW |

The 1987 Mexican Grand Prix was a Formula One motor race held at Autódromo Hermanos Rodríguez in Mexico City on 18 October 1987. It was the fourteenth race of the 1987 Formula One World Championship. It was the 11th Mexican Grand Prix and the second since the Autódromo Hermanos Rodríguez was renovated and returned to the World Championship calendar.

The race was held over a total of 63 laps of the 4.42-kilometre (2.75 mi) circuit for a race distance of 278.5 kilometres (173.1 mi). The race was divided into two heats after British driver Derek Warwick crashed his Arrows A10 heavily exiting the high-speed Peraltada corner on lap 31 after a rear suspension failure; the Arrows car's rear suspension was weakened by Satoru Nakajima crashing his Lotus-Honda straight into the back of Warwick's car at the end of the main straight earlier in the race. The results of the first 30 laps were combined with the results of the second race of 33 laps to create a combined result.

The race was won by British driver Nigel Mansell driving a Williams FW11B. Mansell's combined time over the 63 laps was 26 seconds faster than his Brazilian teammate and eventual 1987 World Champion, Nelson Piquet. Piquet actually took the chequered flag first at the end of the second heat, but Mansell's lead over Piquet at the time of Warwick's accident was substantially larger. Piquet had been delayed after a collision with Alain Prost (McLaren MP4/3) on the first lap.

It was Mansell's sixth and last Grand Prix victory for the 1987 season. Riccardo Patrese finished third driving a Brabham BT56. It was Patrese's best result since finishing third in the 1984 Italian Grand Prix. It was just the second podium of the year for Brabham. Brabham would only score one more podium before it would fold in 1992.

Attrition bit heavily into the race with just fifteen cars taking the second race start. Nine survived to the finish. Naturally aspirated Jim Clark Trophy cars climbed into the points with Philippe Alliot (Lola LC87) taking his third top six result for the year.

Ayrton Senna was fined $15,000 for punching a corner marshal after they refused to push his stalled car.

Mansell's victory allowed him to close to within twelve points of his championship leading teammate. With just two races left, only the Williams drivers had enough points to win the championship.

== Classification ==
During Saturday morning's 90 minute free practice session, a number of the turbo teams ran their cars at the 2.5 bar boost limit that would be enforced in 1988. To the surprise of many, lap times actually proved faster than they would in the afternoon's qualifying session when the cars were running their full 4.0 bar boost settings with BBC commentator Murray Walker later attributing it to the fact that at 2.5 bar the drivers had more useable power whereas the high horsepower figures (900–1,000 bhp (671–746 kW; 912–1,014 PS) was largely wasted in anything but a straight line where the faster turbo cars were regularly speed trapped at over 210 mph (338 km/h) on the circuit's 1.2 km (0.75 mi) long main straight during qualifying.

=== Qualifying ===
| Pos | No | Driver | Constructor | Q1 | Q2 | Gap |
|---|---|---|---|---|---|---|
| 1 | 5 | (United Kingdom) Nigel Mansell | Williams-Honda | 1:20.696 | 1:18.383 | |
| 2 | 28 | (Austria) Gerhard Berger | Ferrari | 1:19.992 | 1:18.426 | +0.043 |
| 3 | 6 | (Brazil) Nelson Piquet | Williams-Honda | 1:20.701 | 1:18.463 | +0.080 |
| 4 | 20 | (Belgium) Thierry Boutsen | Benetton-Ford | 1:20.766 | 1:18.691 | +0.308 |
| 5 | 1 | (France) Alain Prost | McLaren-TAG | 1:20.572 | 1:18.742 | +0.359 |
| 6 | 19 | (Italy) Teo Fabi | Benetton-Ford | 1:22.666 | 1:18.992 | +0.609 |
| 7 | 12 | (Brazil) Ayrton Senna | Lotus-Honda | 1:21.361 | 1:19.089 | +0.706 |
| 8 | 7 | (Italy) Riccardo Patrese | Brabham-BMW | 1:21.720 | 1:19.889 | +1.506 |
| 9 | 27 | (Italy) Michele Alboreto | Ferrari | 1:21.290 | 1:19.967 | +1.584 |
| 10 | 8 | (Italy) Andrea de Cesaris | Brabham-BMW | 1:22.930 | 1:20.141 | +1.758 |
| 11 | 17 | (United Kingdom) Derek Warwick | Arrows-Megatron | 1:23.347 | 1:21.664 | +3.281 |
| 12 | 18 | (United States) Eddie Cheever | Arrows-Megatron | 1:24.445 | 1:21.705 | +3.322 |
| 13 | 9 | (United Kingdom) Martin Brundle | Zakspeed | 1:25.184 | 1:21.711 | +3.328 |
| 14 | 24 | (Italy) Alessandro Nannini | Minardi-Motori Moderni | 1:26.055 | 1:22.035 | +3.652 |
| 15 | 2 | (Sweden) Stefan Johansson | McLaren-TAG | 1:22.185 | 1:22.382 | +3.802 |
| 16 | 11 | (Japan) Satoru Nakajima | Lotus-Honda | 1:23.750 | 1:22.214 | +3.831 |
| 17 | 10 | (West Germany) Christian Danner | Zakspeed | 1:23.992 | 1:22.593 | +4.210 |
| 18 | 25 | (France) René Arnoux | Ligier-Megatron | 1:24.299 | 1:23.053 | +4.670 |
| 19 | 23 | (Spain) Adrián Campos | Minardi-Motori Moderni | 1:27.798 | 1:23.955 | +5.572 |
| 20 | 16 | (Italy) Ivan Capelli | March-Ford | 1:27.161 | 1:24.404 | +6.021 |
| 21 | 26 | (Italy) Piercarlo Ghinzani | Ligier-Megatron | 1:27.059 | 1:24.553 | +6.170 |
| 22 | 3 | (United Kingdom) Jonathan Palmer | Tyrrell-Ford | 1:27.306 | 1:24.723 | +6.340 |
| 23 | 29 | (France) Yannick Dalmas | Lola-Ford | 1:28.156 | 1:24.745 | +6.362 |
| 24 | 30 | (France) Philippe Alliot | Lola-Ford | 1:27.184 | 1:25.096 | +6.713 |
| 25 | 4 | (France) Philippe Streiff | Tyrrell-Ford | 1:27.011 | 1:26.305 | +7.922 |
| 26 | 21 | (Italy) Alex Caffi | Osella-Alfa Romeo | 1:27.670 | 1:30.010 | +9.287 |
| DNQ | 14 | (France) Pascal Fabre | AGS-Ford | 1:30.285 | 1:28.655 | +10.272 |

=== Race ===
Numbers in brackets refer to positions of normally aspirated entrants competing for the Jim Clark Trophy.

| Pos | No | Driver | Constructor | Laps | Time/Retired | Grid | Points |
|---|---|---|---|---|---|---|---|
| 1 | 5 | (United Kingdom) Nigel Mansell | Williams-Honda | 63 | 1:26:24.207 | 1 | 9 |
| 2 | 6 | (Brazil) Nelson Piquet | Williams-Honda | 63 | + 26.176 | 3 | 6 |
| 3 | 7 | (Italy) Riccardo Patrese | Brabham-BMW | 63 | + 1:26.879 | 8 | 4 |
| 4 | 18 | (United States) Eddie Cheever | Arrows-Megatron | 63 | + 1:41.352 | 12 | 3 |
| 5 | 19 | (Italy) Teo Fabi | Benetton-Ford | 61 | + 2 laps | 6 | 2 |
| 6 (1) | 30 | (France) Philippe Alliot | Lola-Ford | 60 | + 3 laps | 24 | 1 |
| 7 (2) | 3 | (United Kingdom) Jonathan Palmer | Tyrrell-Ford | 60 | + 3 laps | 22 | |
| 8 (3) | 4 | (France) Philippe Streiff | Tyrrell-Ford | 60 | + 3 laps | 25 | |
| 9 (4) | 29 | (France) Yannick Dalmas | Lola-Ford | 59 | + 4 laps | 23 | |
| Ret | 12 | (Brazil) Ayrton Senna | Lotus-Honda | 54 | Clutch | 7 | |
| Ret | 16 | (Italy) Ivan Capelli | March-Ford | 51 | Water leak | 20 | |
| Ret | 21 | (Italy) Alex Caffi | Osella-Alfa Romeo | 50 | Engine | 26 | |
| Ret | 26 | (Italy) Piercarlo Ghinzani | Ligier-Megatron | 43 | Water leak | 21 | |
| Ret | 23 | (Spain) Adrián Campos | Minardi-Motori Moderni | 32 | Transmission | 19 | |
| Ret | 25 | (France) René Arnoux | Ligier-Megatron | 29 | Overheating | 18 | |
| Ret | 17 | (United Kingdom) Derek Warwick | Arrows-Megatron | 26 | Accident | 11 | |
| Ret | 8 | (Italy) Andrea de Cesaris | Brabham-BMW | 22 | Accident | 10 | |
| Ret | 28 | (Austria) Gerhard Berger | Ferrari | 20 | Turbo | 2 | |
| Ret | 20 | (Belgium) Thierry Boutsen | Benetton-Ford | 15 | Electrical | 4 | |
| Ret | 24 | (Italy) Alessandro Nannini | Minardi-Motori Moderni | 13 | Turbo | 14 | |
| Ret | 27 | (Italy) Michele Alboreto | Ferrari | 12 | Engine | 9 | |
| Ret | 9 | (United Kingdom) Martin Brundle | Zakspeed | 3 | Turbo | 13 | |
| Ret | 2 | (Sweden) Stefan Johansson | McLaren-TAG | 1 | Collision | 15 | |
| Ret | 11 | (Japan) Satoru Nakajima | Lotus-Honda | 1 | Collision | 16 | |
| Ret | 10 | (West Germany) Christian Danner | Zakspeed | 1 | Collision | 17 | |
| Ret | 1 | (France) Alain Prost | McLaren-TAG | 0 | Collision | 5 | |

== Championship standings after the race ==
Drivers' Championship standings

| Pos | Driver | Points |
|---|---|---|
| 1 | (Brazil) Nelson Piquet | 73 (76) |
| 2 | (United Kingdom) Nigel Mansell | 61 |
| 3 | (Brazil) Ayrton Senna | 51 |
| 4 | (France) Alain Prost | 46 |
| 5 | (Sweden) Stefan Johansson | 26 |

Constructors' Championship standings

| Pos | Constructor | Points |
|---|---|---|
| 1 | (United Kingdom) Williams-Honda | 137 |
| 2 | (United Kingdom) McLaren-TAG | 72 |
| 3 | (United Kingdom) Lotus-Honda | 57 |
| 4 | (Italy) Ferrari | 26 |
| 5 | (United Kingdom) Benetton-Ford | 22 |

Jim Clark Trophy standings

| Pos | Driver | Points |
|---|---|---|
| 1 | (United Kingdom) Jonathan Palmer | 77 |
| 2 | (France) Philippe Streiff | 68 |
| 3 | (France) Philippe Alliot | 43 |
| 4 | (Italy) Ivan Capelli | 38 |
| 5 | (France) Pascal Fabre | 35 |

Colin Chapman Trophy standings

| Pos | Constructor | Points |
|---|---|---|
| 1 | (United Kingdom) Tyrrell-Ford | 145 |
| 2 | (France) Lola-Ford | 43 |
| 3 | (United Kingdom) March-Ford | 38 |
| 4 | (France) AGS-Ford | 35 |

- Note: Only the top five positions are included for all four sets of standings.

| Previous race: 1987 Spanish Grand Prix | FIA Formula One World Championship; 1987 season | Next race: 1987 Japanese Grand Prix |
| Previous race: 1986 Mexican Grand Prix | Mexican Grand Prix | Next race: 1988 Mexican Grand Prix |
