= 1987 Belgian Grand Prix =

- Race 3 of 16 in the 1987 Formula One World Championship
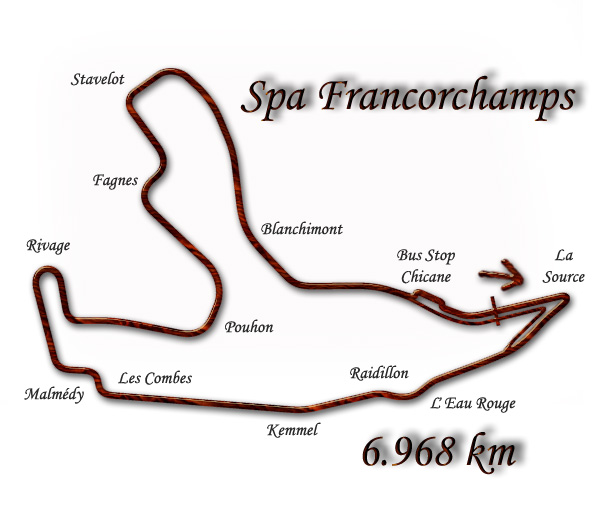

Race details
- Date: 17 May 1987
- Official name: XLV Grand Prix de Belgique
- Location: Circuit de Spa-Francorchamps; Francorchamps, Wallonia, Belgium
- Course: Permanent racing facility
- Course length: 6.940 km (4.312 miles)
- Distance: 43 laps, 298.420 km (185.429 miles)
- Weather: Cloudy and cool

Pole position
Driver	(United Kingdom) Nigel Mansell	Williams-Honda
- Time: 1:52.026

Fastest lap
Driver	(France) Alain Prost	McLaren-TAG
- Time: 1:57.153 on lap 26

Podium
First	(France) Alain Prost	McLaren-TAG
Second	(Sweden) Stefan Johansson	McLaren-TAG
Third	(Italy) Andrea de Cesaris	Brabham-BMW

The 1987 Belgian Grand Prix was a Formula One motor race held on 17 May 1987 at the Circuit de Spa-Francorchamps, Francorchamps, Wallonia. Contested over 43 laps, the race was the 45th Belgian Grand Prix, the 33rd to be held at Spa and the fourth since the circuit was redeveloped in 1979, and the third race of the 1987 Formula One season.

The race was won by France's Alain Prost driving a McLaren-TAG. This was Prost's second victory of the 1987 season and his second in the Belgian Grand Prix (after 1983), as well as his 27th Grand Prix victory overall, equalling Jackie Stewart's all-time record. Prost's Swedish team-mate Stefan Johansson finished second, the only other driver on the same lap, giving McLaren their first 1-2 finish since the previous year's Monaco Grand Prix. Italy's Andrea de Cesaris, driving a Brabham-BMW, finished third despite having to push his car over the line as he had run out of fuel.

The win gave Prost a five-point lead over Johansson in the Drivers' Championship. Williams driver Nigel Mansell was three points further back; a first-lap collision with Ayrton Senna's Lotus had ultimately led to his retirement from the race, after which he angrily confronted the Brazilian driver in the Lotus garage.

== Background ==
The event, officially called the Grand Prix de Belgique, was held at the 6.940-kilometre (4.312 mi) Circuit de Spa-Francorchamps outside the Belgian village of Francorchamps. Untimed free practice sessions were held on the mornings of Friday 15 May, Saturday 16 May, and Sunday 17 May 1987, with timed qualifying practice sessions held on the Friday and Saturday afternoons and the main Grand Prix race itself held on the Sunday afternoon. Twenty-six cars were entered by fifteen constructors. All teams used Goodyear tyres. Automobiles Gonfaronnaises Sportives (AGS), Arrows, Benetton Formula, Scuderia Ferrari, Ligier, Team Lotus, McLaren, Minardi, Tyrrell Racing, Williams, and Zakspeed had all modified their cars to varying extents ahead of this event. Friday practice was wet with temperatures below 7 °C (45 °F). The race was held in dry conditions with temperatures around 11 °C (52 °F).

== Race summary ==
Qualifying runs saw the two Williams FW11Bs take the front row, with Nigel Mansell on the pole, nearly 1.5 seconds faster than Nelson Piquet. Certainly, Piquet was still suffering the results of his accident at Imola. Ayrton Senna took the third place in his Lotus 99T ahead of the two Ferrari F1/87s of Gerhard Berger and Michele Alboreto.

The race required two starts. On the first start Mansell took the lead ahead of Senna, Piquet and Alboreto. At the back of the grid René Arnoux (Ligier JS29B) and Andrea de Cesaris (Brabham BT56) tangled, whilst Thierry Boutsen (Benetton B187) hit Berger's spinning Ferrari F1/87. A more serious accident befell Philippe Streiff who crashed heavily at the Eau Rouge before the wreckage was hit by Tyrrell teammate Jonathan Palmer; both were unhurt but their Tyrrell DG016s were reduced to scrap. The accident was of such impact that Streiff's car was split in two. By virtue of qualifying 23rd to his teammate's 24th, and ironically by crashing first, Streiff was given the spare car for the restart forcing Palmer out of the race.

On the second start, Senna led Mansell away, but during lap one the Briton tried to overtake the Brazilian on the outside of the Fagnes chicane. The two controversially tangled, leading to the retirement of the Lotus 99T. Mansell rejoined the race at the back, until the damage sustained in the collision finally forced him to retire on lap 17. Mansell subsequently visited the Lotus garage where harsh words were exchanged and punches were thrown.

Berger retired on lap three with a broken piston whilst on lap 10 second place Michele Alboreto's wheel bearing broke and Nelson Piquet retired with a broken turbo pipe, handing the lead to Alain Prost from Teo Fabi and Stefan Johansson. It was a disappointing day for Ferrari, with Berger having retired earlier with smoke pouring from the back of the car. The pitstops changed little in the situation, and he maintained this to win easily by 25 seconds, despite concerns with his fuel consumption due to a faulty gauge. This was a race of attrition, with Thierry Boutsen's spare Benetton's drive shaft having failed, his teammate Fabi suffering an engine failure, and Patrese’s Brabham suffering electrical problems.

This was Prost's 27th win, equalling Jackie Stewart's record with team-mate Johansson making it a McLaren 1-2. Andrea de Cesaris drove superbly to finish third for Brabham despite having to push his car over the line with Eddie Cheever (Arrows A10), Satoru Nakajima (Lotus 99T) and Arnoux taking the remaining points. With the setbacks to the Tyrrell drivers, the Jim Clark points were won by the Lola LC87 of Philippe Alliot, who at one point spun in front of Prost before Pouhon while being lapped, giving him a minor scare. As of 2026, this was also the last time that the Belgian Grand Prix was held at the beginning of the season; since 1988, it has always been held in July, August or September.

== Classification ==
=== Qualifying ===
Pos	No	Driver	Constructor	Q1	Q2	Gap	Grid
1	5	(United Kingdom) Nigel Mansell	Williams-Honda	2:06.965	1:52.026	—	1
2	6	(Brazil) Nelson Piquet	Williams-Honda	2:08.143	1:53.416	+1.390	2
3	12	(Brazil) Ayrton Senna	Lotus-Honda	2:08.450	1:53.426	+1.400	3
4	28	(Austria) Gerhard Berger	Ferrari	2:06.216	1:53.451	+1.425	4
5	27	(Italy) Michele Alboreto	Ferrari	2:07.459	1:53.511	+1.485	5
6	1	(France) Alain Prost	McLaren-TAG	2:11.203	1:54.186	+2.160	6
7	20	(Belgium) Thierry Boutsen	Benetton-Ford	2:08.752	1:54.300	+2.274	7
8	7	(Italy) Riccardo Patrese	Brabham-BMW	2:12.914	1:55.064	+3.038	8
9	19	(Italy) Teo Fabi	Benetton-Ford	2:12.358	1:55.339	+3.313	9
10	2	(Sweden) Stefan Johansson	McLaren-TAG	2:12.063	1:55.781	+3.755	10
11	18	(United States) Eddie Cheever	Arrows-Megatron	2:15.321	1:55.899	+3.873	11
12	17	(United Kingdom) Derek Warwick	Arrows-Megatron	2:10.946	1:56.359	+4.333	12
13	8	(Italy) Andrea de Cesaris	Brabham-BMW	2:13.871	1:57.101	+5.075	13
14	24	(Italy) Alessandro Nannini	Minardi-Motori Moderni	2:09.650	1:58.132	+6.106	14
15	11	(Japan) Satoru Nakajima	Lotus-Honda	2:11.441	1:58.649	+6.623	15
16	25	(France) René Arnoux	Ligier-Megatron	2:15.012	1:59.117	+7.091	16
17	26	(Italy) Piercarlo Ghinzani	Ligier-Megatron	2:15.339	1:59.291	+7.265	17
18	9	(United Kingdom) Martin Brundle	Zakspeed	2:14.432	2:00.433	+8.407	18
19	23	(Spain) Adrián Campos	Minardi-Motori Moderni	2:14.945	2:00.763	+8.737	19
20	10	(West Germany) Christian Danner	Zakspeed	2:20.610	2:01.072	+9.046	20
21	16	(Italy) Ivan Capelli	March-Ford	2:13.355	2:02.036	+10.010	21
22	30	(France) Philippe Alliot	Lola-Ford	2:13.082	2:02.347	+10.321	22
23	4	(France) Philippe Streiff	Tyrrell-Ford	2:18.900	2:03.098	+11.072	23
24	3	(United Kingdom) Jonathan Palmer	Tyrrell-Ford	2:14.931	2:04.677	+12.651	24
25	14	(France) Pascal Fabre	AGS-Ford	2:26.498	2:07.361	+15.335	25
26	21	(Italy) Alex Caffi	Osella-Alfa Romeo	2:16.268	2:12.086	+20.060	26

=== Race ===
Numbers in brackets refer to positions of normally aspirated entrants competing for the Jim Clark Trophy.

Pos	No	Driver	Constructor	Laps	Time/Retired	Grid	Points
1	1	(France) Alain Prost	McLaren-TAG	43	1:27:03.217	6	9
2	2	(Sweden) Stefan Johansson	McLaren-TAG	43	+24.764	10	6
3	8	(Italy) Andrea de Cesaris	Brabham-BMW	42	Out of fuel	13	4
4	18	(United States) Eddie Cheever	Arrows-Megatron	42	+1 lap	11	3
5	11	(Japan) Satoru Nakajima	Lotus-Honda	42	+1 lap	15	2
6	25	(France) René Arnoux	Ligier-Megatron	41	+2 laps	16	1
7	26	(Italy) Piercarlo Ghinzani	Ligier-Megatron	40	Out of fuel	17	
8 (1)	30	(France) Philippe Alliot	Lola-Ford	40	+3 laps	22	
9 (2)	4	(France) Philippe Streiff	Tyrrell-Ford	39	+4 laps	23	
10 (3)	14	(France) Pascal Fabre	AGS-Ford	38	Ignition	25	
Ret	19	(Italy) Teo Fabi	Benetton-Ford	34	Engine	9	
Ret	9	(United Kingdom) Martin Brundle	Zakspeed	19	Overheating	18	
Ret	20	(Belgium) Thierry Boutsen	Benetton-Ford	18	Wheel bearing	7	
Ret	5	(United Kingdom) Nigel Mansell	Williams-Honda	17	Accident	1	
Ret	16	(Italy) Ivan Capelli	March-Ford	14	Engine	21	
Ret	6	(Brazil) Nelson Piquet	Williams-Honda	11	Exhaust	2	
Ret	21	(Italy) Alex Caffi	Osella-Alfa Romeo	11	Fuel leak	26	
Ret	27	(Italy) Michele Alboreto	Ferrari	9	Transmission	5	
Ret	10	(West Germany) Christian Danner	Zakspeed	9	Brakes	20	
Ret	17	(United Kingdom) Derek Warwick	Arrows-Megatron	8	Radiator	12	
Ret	7	(Italy) Riccardo Patrese	Brabham-BMW	5	Clutch	8	
Ret	28	(Austria) Gerhard Berger	Ferrari	2	Engine	4	
Ret	24	(Italy) Alessandro Nannini	Minardi-Motori Moderni	1	Turbo	14	
Ret	12	(Brazil) Ayrton Senna	Lotus-Honda	0	Collision	3	
Ret	23	(Spain) Adrián Campos	Minardi-Motori Moderni	0	Gearbox	19	
Ret	3	(United Kingdom) Jonathan Palmer	Tyrrell-Ford	0	Collision	24	

== Championship standings after the race ==
Drivers' Championship standings

Pos	Driver	Points
1	(France) Alain Prost	18
2	(Sweden) Stefan Johansson	13
3	(United Kingdom) Nigel Mansell	10
4	(Brazil) Nelson Piquet	6
5	(Brazil) Ayrton Senna	6

Constructors' Championship standings

Pos	Constructor	Points
1	(United Kingdom) McLaren-TAG	31
2	(United Kingdom) Williams-Honda	16
3	(United Kingdom) Lotus-Honda	9
4	(Italy) Ferrari	7
5	(United Kingdom) Brabham-BMW	4

Jim Clark Trophy standings

Pos	Driver	Points
1	(France) Philippe Streiff	21
2	(France) Philippe Alliot	15
3	(France) Pascal Fabre	12
4	(United Kingdom) Jonathan Palmer	9

Colin Chapman trophy standings

Pos	Constructor	Points
1	(United Kingdom) Tyrrell-Ford	30
2	(France) Lola-Ford	15
3	(France) AGS-Ford	12

- Note: Only the top five positions are included for all four sets of standings.

Previous race: 1987 San Marino Grand Prix	FIA Formula One World Championship; 1987 season	Next race: 1987 Monaco Grand Prix
Previous race: 1986 Belgian Grand Prix	Belgian Grand Prix	Next race: 1988 Belgian Grand Prix
