= Pacific PR01 =

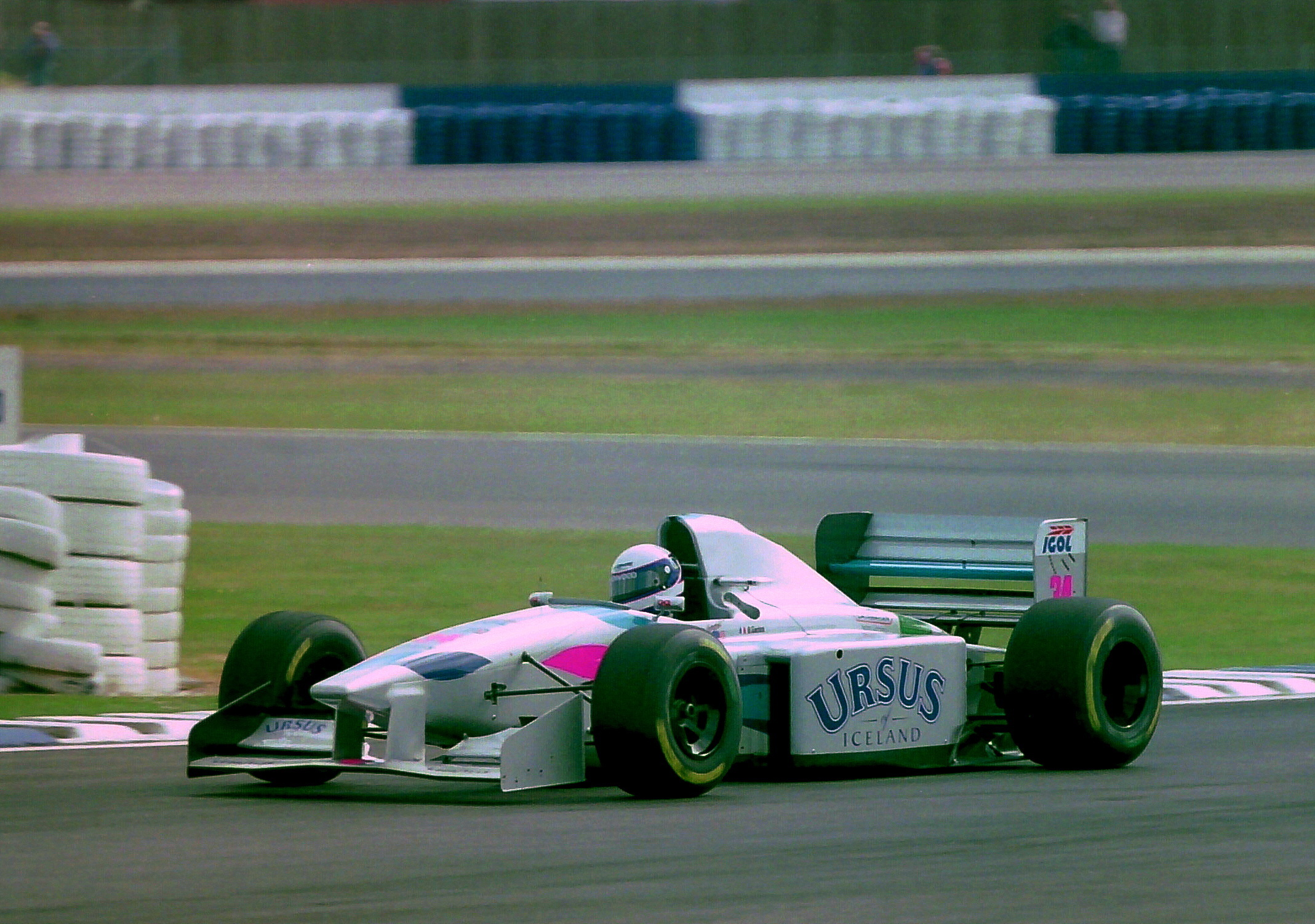
- Category: Formula One
- Constructor: Pacific Grand Prix
- Designer: Paul Brown
- Successor: PR02

Technical specifications
- Suspension (front): Push rod
- Suspension (rear): Push rod
- Engine: Ilmor 2175A, 3478.7cc, 72-degree V10, naturally aspirated,
- Transmission: Pacific 6-speed
- Power: 696 hp @ 12,800 rpm
- Fuel: Elf
- Tyres: Goodyear

Competition history
- Notable entrants: Ursus Pacific Grand Prix
- Notable drivers: 33. (France) Paul Belmondo; 34. (France) Bertrand Gachot; TD. (Italy) Giovanni Lavaggi; TD. (United Kingdom) Oliver Gavin
- Debut: 1994 Brazilian Grand Prix, Autódromo José Carlos Pace.
Races	Wins	Podiums	Poles	F/Laps
16	0	0	0	0
- Constructors' Championships: 0
- Drivers' Championships: 0

The Pacific PR01 is a Formula One car, designed by Paul Brown for the 1993 season. However, due to financial problems, it did not race until 1994.

== Overview ==
=== Name and livery ===
The designation "PR01" is a compound of the initials of Pacific Racing ("PR") and "01", representing their first entry in Formula One. The PR01 was driven by Paul Belmondo and Bertrand Gachot for the whole season, with the test drivers being Oliver Gavin and Giovanni Lavaggi. Pacific lacked a single main sponsor for the 1994 season and the car ran with many different names on the sidepods, including Ursus.

Despite having power supplied by Mercedes-affiliated Ilmor, the Pacific team suffered from the perennial problem of many new Grand Prix teams, namely a lack of finances. The PR01 was designed for the 1993 season and ended up being seriously off the pace in 1994. More often it failed to qualify, with the car only ever making it to the grid seven times and never finishing a race.

=== Aerodynamics ===
Most of the PR01's aerodynamics and design as a whole was based on Reynard's stillborn car, due to be raced in 1992. Several very experienced personnel were involved in the project, including Rory Byrne, then recently from Benetton. During 1991, Reynard concluded that the project would not be ready, so the entire program, including the Enstone factory, was sold to Benetton. Reynard's aerodynamic research data was sold to Ligier and Pacific. The design was refined by Pacific with 'best guess' aerodynamics, as the car had undergone none of the vital wind tunnel testing required to refine the car's aerodynamics. The car had only a few dozen miles of track testing. No major upgrades were made and because of this it suffered from fundamental problems. Major modifications were meant to be carried out after the tragedy at Imola, but they never happened. Pacific did, however, modify the car on the plank of the suspensions, but this proved to be insufficient to improve the performance of the car. The team also introduced a low nose during the season.

=== Engine ===
The naturally aspirated 3.5 L V10 engine from Ilmor was of a two-year-old design - underpowered by 1994 standards; it was not upgraded.

== 1994 season ==
The PR01 was used in every race of the season. At the 1st round of the season in Brazil, Belmondo failed to qualify, but Gachot managed to qualify. Unfortunately, he crashed out of the race. They both failed to qualify for the next round in Aida, but Gachot qualified for Imola only to retire with an oil-pressure problem. Belmondo and Gachot qualified for the next two rounds of the world championship. This would be the only two rounds of the season Belmondo would qualify for. Gachot qualified for the 6th round in Canada, only to be hit by an oil-pressure problem again. This would be the final time any of the two cars qualified in the season as Gachot and Belmondo did not qualify for the remaining ten rounds of the season. The team even considered withdrawing from the championship in order to work on their PR02 chassis, however if this happened, they would have had to pay a substantial fine.

== Complete Formula One results ==
(key)

Year	Team	Engine	Tyres	Drivers	1	2	3	4	5	6	7	8	9	10	11	12	13	14	15	16	Points	WCC
1994	Pacific Racing	Ilmor 2175A V10	G		BRA	PAC	SMR	MON	ESP	CAN	FRA	GBR	GER	HUN	BEL	ITA	POR	EUR	JPN	AUS	0	NC
1994	Pacific Racing	Ilmor 2175A V10	G	Paul Belmondo	DNQ	DNQ	DNQ	Ret	Ret	DNQ	DNQ	DNQ	DNQ	DNQ	DNQ	DNQ	DNQ	DNQ	DNQ	DNQ	0	NC
1994	Pacific Racing	Ilmor 2175A V10	G	Bertrand Gachot	Ret	DNQ	Ret	Ret	Ret	Ret	DNQ	DNQ	DNQ	DNQ	DNQ	DNQ	DNQ	DNQ	DNQ	DNQ	0	NC
