= Lotus Racing =

Lotus Racing may refer to:

- The umbrella name for Lotus Cars parent company Group Lotus plc's racing division, formerly Lotus Motorsport
- The name under which Team Lotus (2010–2011) competed in the 2010 Formula One season

== See also ==
- Team Lotus, motorsport team in the period 1954–1994
- Pacific Team Lotus, participant in the 1994 and 1995 Formula One seasons
- Lotus Renault GP, participant in the 2011 Formula One season
- Lotus F1, participant in Formula One from 2012 until 2015
