= Bertrand Gachot =

Racing driver (born 1962)

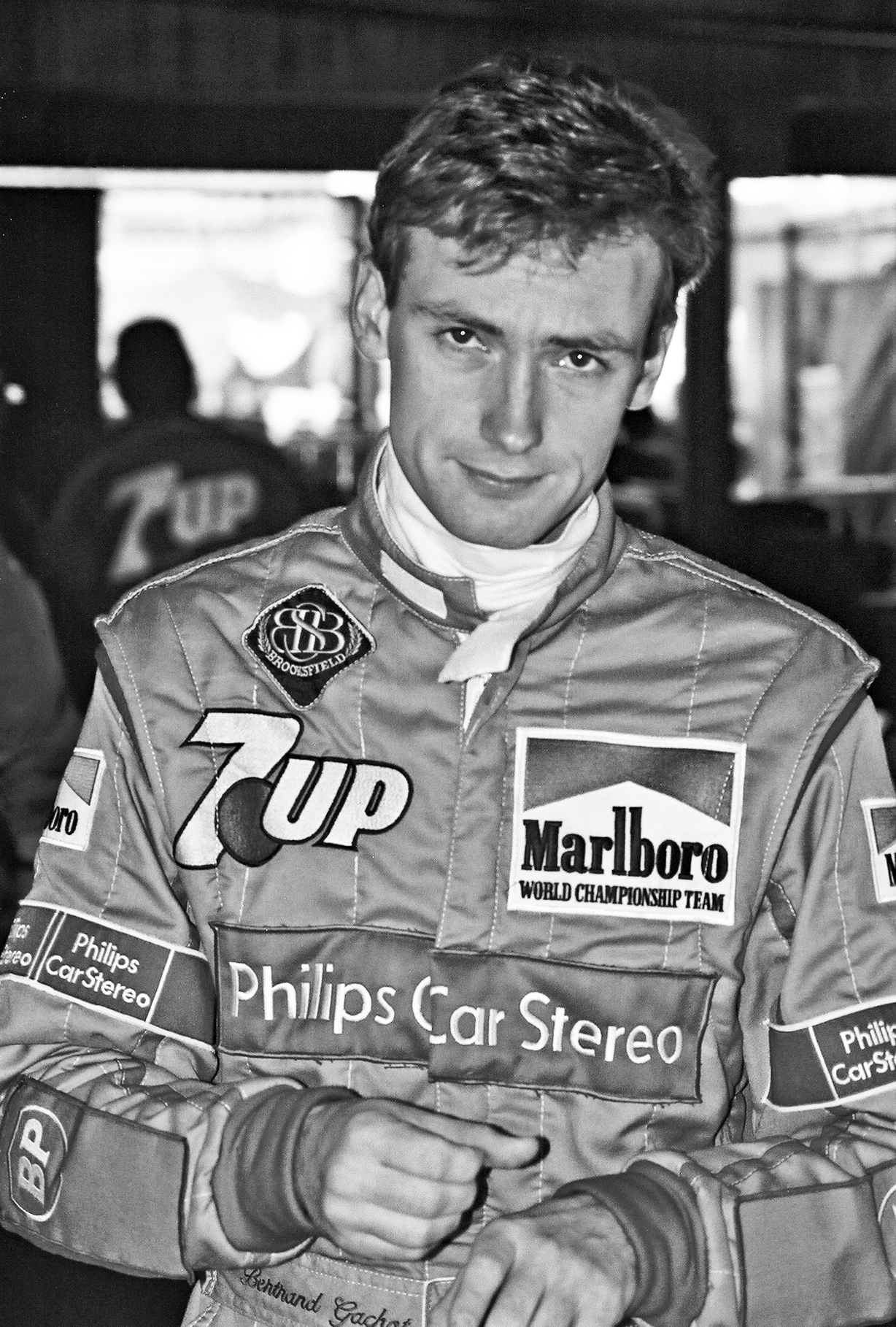
- Gachot at the 1991 United States Grand Prix
- Born: Bertrand Jean Louis Gachot; 23 December 1962 (age 63); Luxembourg City, Luxembourg
- Spouse: Amanda Brady (m. 1998)
- Children: 3

Formula One World Championship career
- Nationality: (Belgium) Belgian (1989–1991); (France) French (1992, 1994–1995)
- Active years: 1989–1992, 1994–1995
- Team(s): Onyx, Rial, Coloni, Jordan, Larrousse, Pacific
- Entries: 84 (47 starts)
- Championships: 0
- Wins: 0
- Podiums: 0
- Career points: 5
- Pole positions: 0
- Fastest laps: 1
- First entry: 1989 Brazilian Grand Prix
- Last entry: 1995 Australian Grand Prix

24 Hours of Le Mans career
- Years: 1990–1992, 1994–1995, 1997
- Teams: Mazda, Honda, Kremer
- Best finish: 1st (1991)
- Class wins: 1 (1991)

Bertrand Jean Louis Gachot (French pronunciation: [bɛʁ.tʁɑ̃ ʒɑ̃ ɡa.ʃo]; born 23 December 1962) is a former racing driver and businessman who competed in Formula One from 1989 to 1995. In endurance racing, Gachot won the 24 Hours of Le Mans in 1991 with Mazda.

Gachot was born in Luxembourg City to a French father and German mother and began competitive kart racing at the age of fifteen before attending the Winfield Racing School at Paul Ricard in 1983. Gachot enjoyed some success in the junior formulae, winning titles in Formula Ford before progressing through Formula 3 and Formula 3000, reaching Formula One in 1989.

After winning the 1991 24 Hours of Le Mans, Gachot was sentenced to eighteen months in prison for an aggravated assault with a London taxi driver that had occurred the previous December. He was released after two months on appeal, but was replaced by debutant Michael Schumacher, Roberto Moreno and Alessandro Zanardi for the remainder of the 1991 season.

== Career ==
Gachot was born in Luxembourg City on 23 December 1962, the son of a French European Commission official and a German mother. He began karting at the age of 15. In 1983, he attended the Winfield School, a racing driving school based at the Paul Ricard circuit where Gachot competed with fellow future F1 drivers Damon Hill, Jean Alesi, and Eric Bernard for the Volant Elf; a prize of a season in Formula Renault backed by Elf. Although Bernard won the lucrative prize, Gachot subsequently dropped out of university to focus on his racing career. In 1984, he competed in Formula Ford 1600, and finished third at the Formula Ford Festival, and then won the European series in 1985 driving for Pacific Racing. In 1986, he moved up to Formula Ford 2000 and had a fierce rivalry with Mark Blundell, with Gachot winning the British series and Blundell winning the European series.

Gachot joined the British Formula Three series in 1987, finishing second in the championship for the West Surrey Racing team behind Johnny Herbert. He and Herbert notably guested at Silverstone in the 1987 ESSO MG Metro Turbo Challenge at the end of that August. The two of them would later go on to win Le Mans together in 1991 with ex-Rial F1 Driver Volker Weidler.

Gachot switched to the Formula 3000 series in 1988, and met with some success, taking pole position at the Silverstone round, and finishing second to Roberto Moreno who went on to win the championship; Gachot finishing fifth in the final standings.

== Formula One ==
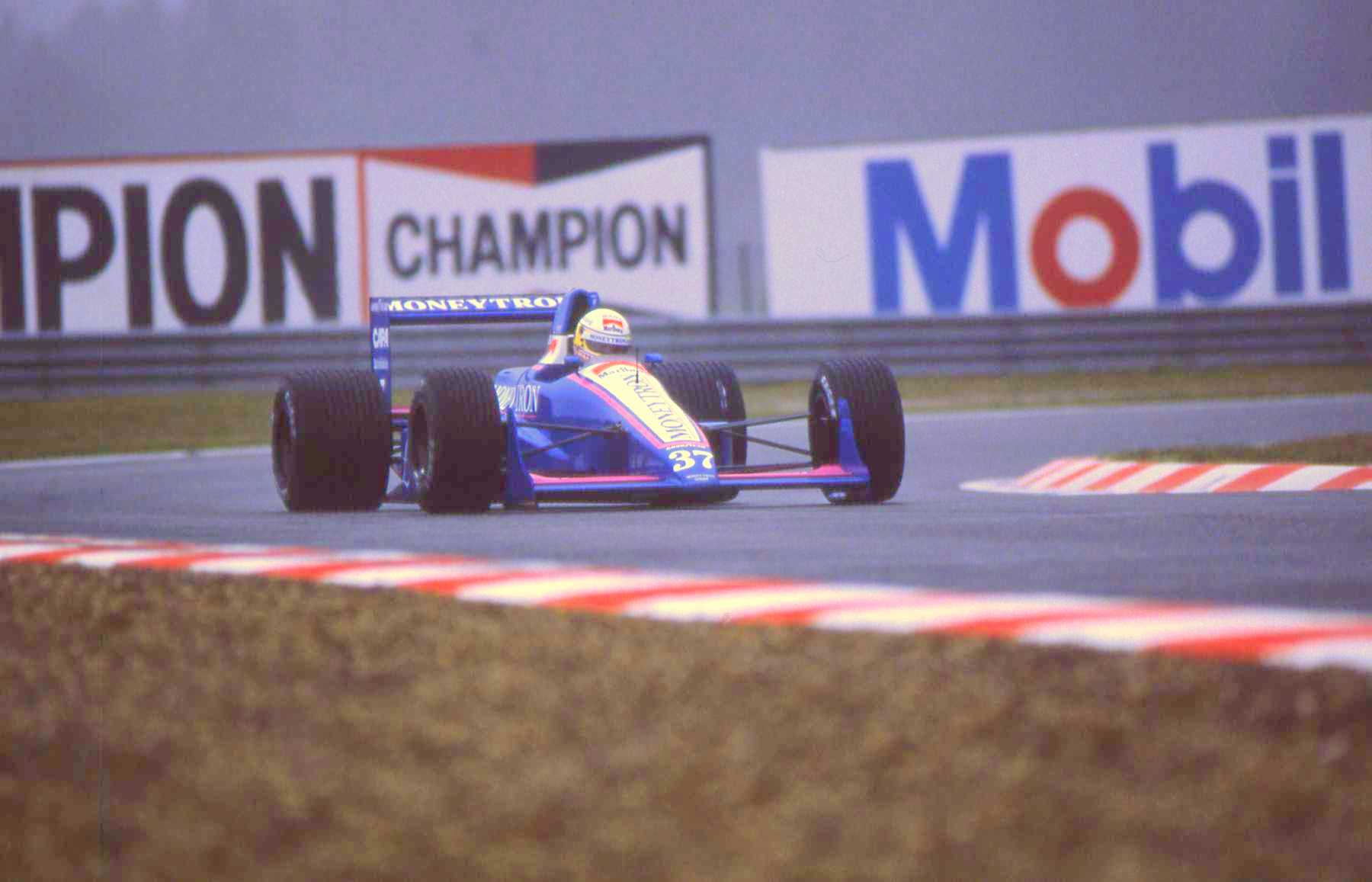
Gachot driving for Onyx at the 1989 Belgian Grand Prix.

By this stage, Gachot was considered one of the sport's most promising young drivers. He was signed by the newly formed Onyx team, having played a role in attracting the team's Moneytron sponsorship from businessman Jean-Pierre Van Rossem, and was partnered with the experienced Stefan Johansson. The team was well funded, but late in getting its car prepared. As a new entrant it was obliged to pre-qualify, and it was not until the French Grand Prix that Gachot made it onto the grid. He started 11th (two places ahead of Johansson) and ran in the points until battery problems dropped him to an eventual 13th and last. Despite qualifying for four of the next five events, he was then fired by van Rossem after complaining about his lack of testing time; his private grievances were publicly aired in an Onyx press release, and he was replaced with JJ Lehto. In early October he tested with Arrows at Silverstone, as he was being considered for a drive in 1990 which did not materialize. Gachot then found employment with the struggling Rial team for the final two races of the season, failing to qualify its ageing chassis for either race. The team folded over the winter.

1990 was initially more promising, as Gachot switched to the Coloni team. The small Italian outfit had signed an exclusive deal with Subaru to use its new Carlo Chiti-designed and Motori Moderni-built 1235 flat-12 engine, and Gachot was selected to drive the sole entry. However, the engine was overweight and underpowered, resulting in a poorly-handling car that rarely ran for more than a few laps; he appeared to have little prospect of getting out of pre-qualifying. At the season opener in Phoenix, his gear selector rod broke on his first flying lap and he was unable to set a representative time. Subaru withdrew entirely after the British Grand Prix. After that, the car ran with a Cosworth DFR engine, and performances improved; the withdrawal of Onyx ironically promoted Gachot to the main qualifying sessions, but the car still was not quick enough and he failed to make the grid all season.

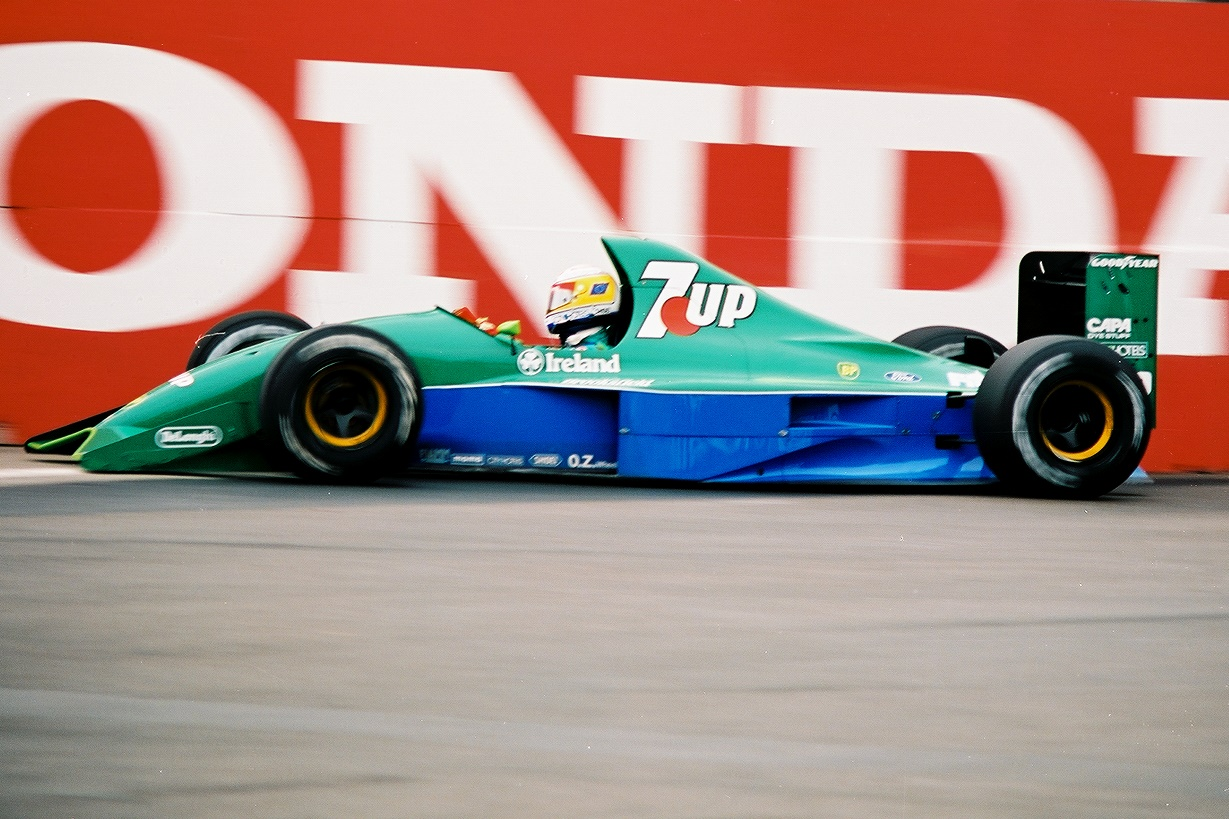
Gachot giving the Jordan team its F1 début at the 1991 United States Grand Prix

Despite this, Gachot was still highly regarded, both as a driver and a marketeer, and was signed to lead the new Jordan Grand Prix team, sponsored by 7-Up and using Ford HB engines. The Gary Anderson-designed 191 was competitive, and after some initial reliability problems became a regular points-scorer; Gachot finished fifth in Canada and sixth twice. The season started off well as he gathered considerable acclaim for his Grand Prix performances, and also won the 1991 24 Hours of Le Mans driving a Mazda 787B. He then set the fastest lap at the Hungarian Grand Prix after a late tyre change but his then fortunes took a dramatic turn.

=== 1991 prison sentence ===
On 10 December 1990 Gachot was due to meet with Jordan and representatives of 7-Up but, on the way and running late, he became involved in a road rage incident with a taxi driver at Hyde Park Corner in London. His car collided with the back of the taxi, but caused no damage to either car. Later, Gachot said the taxi driver pulled him by the tie and raised his fist, at which point Gachot sprayed the taxi driver with CS gas to defend himself. Gachot hid the CS gas canister in a toilet cistern in a nearby building, and was arrested and charged with actual bodily harm (ABH) and possession of a prohibited weapon.

Gachot's trial at Southwark Crown Court was scheduled the week before the 1991 Belgian Grand Prix, a circuit where he expected the Jordan to "fly". Gachot had claimed self-defence, and expected a fine or suspended sentence; he was due to test at Monza after the trial. Instead he was sentenced to 18 months in HMP Brixton and, later, HMP Northeye in Bexhill-on-Sea after an unsuccessful appeal.

The situation prompted a campaign of support organised by Belgian racing driver Pascal Witmeur. This campaign involved flags, T-shirts worn by members of the public and racing drivers, graffiti in several locations of the Spa-Francorchamps track during the 1991 Belgian Grand Prix, and prominent sponsorship on Witmeur's Formula 3000 car. Team owner Eddie Jordan replaced him with Michael Schumacher, whose performance at Spa led to a drive with Benetton. Gachot subsequently said that prison was "a fantastic human experience" and he had about 10,000 letters of support.

=== Return to F1 ===
After two months in prison Gachot's sentence was reduced by the Court of Appeal and he was released. Having missed four Grands Prix, he returned to the F1 paddock at Suzuka to try and retake his Jordan seat from Alessandro Zanardi. The team refused, though Gachot found employment with Larrousse, replacing the injured Éric Bernard for the Australian Grand Prix. He failed to qualify the unfamiliar car, but impressed the team enough to be offered the seat for the following season.

The team ran a Robin Herd-designed Venturi chassis with V12 Lamborghini engines, but suffered reliability and financial problems throughout the season. Gachot and teammate Ukyo Katayama only managed six classified finishes between them from 31 starts, colliding with each other twice. Gachot scored the team's only point of the year with sixth place at Monaco. He also finished fourth for Mazda at Le Mans.

1993 saw Gachot out of Formula 1. He raced for Dick Simon Racing in CART, placing 12th at the Molson Indy Toronto in a one-off drive, and raced in Japanese touring car series for Honda while helping Keith Wiggins' Pacific team prepare to enter Formula One the following season. After becoming a shareholder in the team, Gachot was signed to drive as number 1 alongside pay driver Paul Belmondo for the 1994 season. The PR01 was initially designed as the car for Reynard's proposed entry into the series, used 1992-spec Ilmor V10 engines and was not competitive. After Gachot outqualified Roland Ratzenberger to give the team its debut at the opening round, the Pacifics never again beat fellow newcomers Simtek to the grid; although a series of accidents in the sport led to several reduced entries and Gachot starting a further four races, he failed to finish any. While he had the upper hand over Belmondo after the Canadian Grand Prix, he did not make the grid again that season.

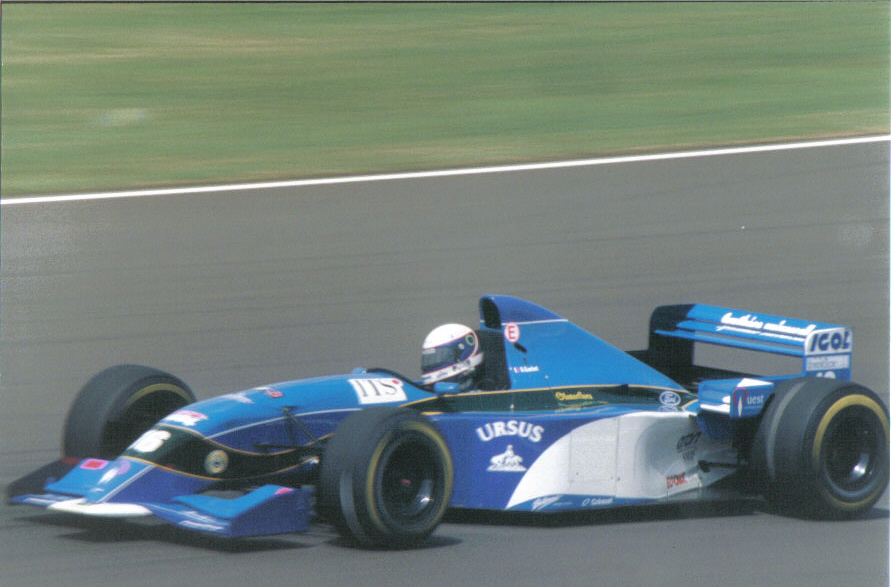
Gachot driving for Pacific at the 1995 British Grand Prix

Gachot stayed with Pacific for 1995, with the new PR02 chassis, Cosworth ED engines and an influx of experienced personnel after a merger with the remains of Team Lotus. There were only 26 entrants; hence, he was a guaranteed starter, and the reliable package meant the car could at least finish races, though Gachot and teammate Andrea Montermini were largely left battling at the back of the grid. The team's finances were tight, and Gachot stood down mid-season so that pay drivers Giovanni Lavaggi and Jean-Denis Délétraz could take his seat and bring some money to Pacific. After Délétraz's sponsors defaulted on payments, the team planned to rent the drive to Formula Nippon driver Katsumi Yamamoto for the two races in Japan, but he was not granted a superlicence, so Gachot retook the seat. Gachot also intended to hand the car over to the team's test driver Oliver Gavin for the season finale in Australia; however, the Englishman was also refused a superlicence and the Frenchman was forced back into the car, equalling the team's best result with 8th place after much of the field had retired. It was Gachot's final Grand Prix, for Pacific folded at the end of the season.

Gachot formed his own sports car team with the aim of participating in the 1996 24 Hours of Le Mans. The team entered a Welter Racing LM94 with factory support and engine from SsangYong, in what was a rare motorsport outing for the South Korean automotive manufacturer. The car participated in the pre-qualifying session but did not qualify for the race. It was again entered in the Coupes d'Automne Automobile Club de l'Ouest, a four-hour sports car race held at the Le Mans Bugatti circuit later in the 1996 season, where it qualified 3rd but did not finish.

Gachot later drove in occasional sports car and GT races for a variety of manufacturers and privateers.

== Business interests ==
Following his F1 career, Gachot began to develop his business portfolio, he signed a distribution agreement with Hype Energy Drinks in 1997. The company had been started in 1994 by the founder of Hard Rock Cafe, Brian Cox, and had been sponsoring motorsports including F1. Gachot had aimed to introduce the brand into France but by 2000 had taken a leadership role within Hype Energy; he began restructuring the company, simplifying the product portfolio, keeping only four flavours on the market. Growth had followed shortly after, and by 2014, he was able to put Hype Energy back into the F1 Paddock with sponsorship of André Lotterer. 2015 saw Gachot come full circle as Hype Energy announced a sponsorship deal with Force India F1 Team, the team who had previously been Jordan F1 and for whom Gachot had raced. Gachot utilised this and other sponsorships to push the brand into new markets, announcing sales in the USA later that year. By 2017, Gachot had been pushing the brand further into the music industry, working with Migos, Mike WiLL Made It and Prince Royce. He still continues to fill the role of CEO at the company.

Gachot also owns F1i.com, a Formula 1 news site.

== Nationality ==
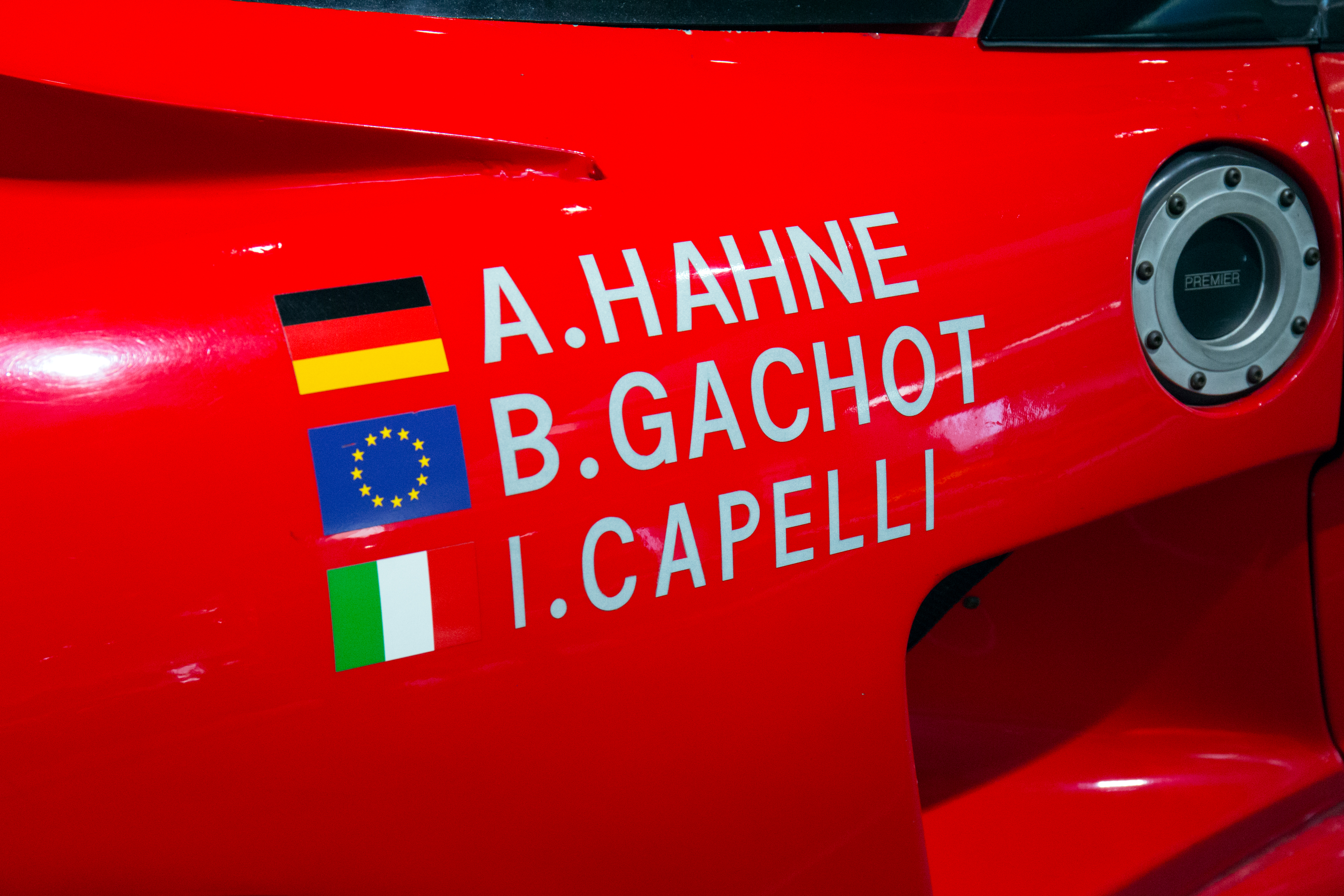
Gachot's Honda NSX Le Mans GT1 car shows his name with the flag of Europe

Gachot raced under more than one flag during his career. He initially competed with a Belgian FIA Super Licence, despite carrying a French passport. From the 1992 season onwards he changed to a French licence.

Gachot is a supporter of the unification of Europe. In a 1991 interview, Gachot said that "I am not really one nationality. I feel very much a European, but today I have to accept that a united Europe is not yet a reality. Certainly from a legal point of view." His helmet design features the circle of yellow stars on a blue background from the flag of Europe.

== Racing record ==
=== Career summary ===
Season	Series	Team	Races	Wins	Poles	F/Laps	Podiums	Points	Position
1984	Formula Ford Festival		1	0	0	?	1	N/A	**3rd**
1985	British Formula Ford Championship		?	4	?	1	?	60	**1st**
1985	British Formula Three	Intersport Racing	1	0	0	0	0	0	NC
1985	Formula Ford 1600 Great Britain	Pacific Racing	?	?	?	?	?	0	NC
1986	Formula Ford 2000 Great Britain	Pacific Racing	?	?	?	?	?	0	**1st**
1986	Formula Ford 2000 Europe		?	?	?	?	?	121	**2nd**
1987	British Formula Three	West Surrey Racing	18	3	3	2	8	64	**2nd**
1987	European Formula Three Cup	West Surrey Racing	1	0	0	0	1	N/A	**3rd**
1987	Macau Grand Prix	West Surrey Racing	1	0	0	0	0	N/A	DNF
1988	International Formula 3000	Spirit/TOM's Racing	11	0	1	0	2	21	5th
1988	European Touring Car Championship	Eggenberger Motorsport	1	0	0	0	0	0	NC
1988	Macau Grand Prix	Marlboro Theodore Racing	1	0	0	0	0	N/A	DNF
1989	Formula One	Moneytron Onyx Formula One	5	0	0	0	0	0	NC
1989	Formula One	Rial Racing	5	0	0	0	0	0	NC
1989	World Sportscar Championship	Richard Lloyd Racing	1	0	0	0	0	0	NC
1989	Macau Grand Prix	Federal Express Intersport Racing	1	0	0	0	0	N/A	DNF
1990	Formula One	Subaru Coloni Racing	0	0	0	0	0	0	NC
1990	Formula One	Coloni Racing Srl	0	0	0	0	0	0	NC
1990	24 Hours of Le Mans	Mazdaspeed Co. Ltd.	1	0	0	0	0	N/A	DNF
1991	Formula One	Team 7UP Jordan	10	0	0	1	0	4	13th
1991	Formula One	Larrousse F1	10	0	0	1	0	4	13th
1991	All-Japan Sports Prototype Championship	Mazdaspeed Co. Ltd.	1	0	0	0	0	10	24th
1991	24 Hours of Le Mans	Mazdaspeed Co. Ltd.	1	1	0	0	1	N/A	**1st**
1992	Formula One	Central Park Venturi Larrousse	16	0	0	0	0	1	19th
1992	24 Hours of Le Mans	Mazdaspeed Co. Ltd.	1	0	0	0	0	N/A	4th
1992	24 Hours of Le Mans	Oreca	1	0	0	0	0	N/A	4th
1993	PPG Indy Car World Series	Dick Simon Racing	1	0	0	0	0	1	34th
1994	Formula One	Pacific Grand Prix Ltd	5	0	0	0	0	0	NC
1994	24 Hours of Le Mans	Kremer Honda Racing	1	0	0	0	0	N/A	14th
1995	Formula One	Pacific Team Lotus	11	0	0	0	0	0	NC
1995	Belgian Procar Championship	Honda Team Vzm	3	0	0	0	0	0	NC
1995	24 Hours of Le Mans	Honda Motor Co. Ltd.	1	0	0	0	0	N/A	DNF
1996	All Japan Grand Touring Car Championship	FET Racing Team	3	0	0	0	0	14	13th
1997	All Japan Grand Touring Car Championship	Power Craft	6	0	0	0	0	12	15th
1997	All Japan Grand Touring Car Championship	Ryowa House Pacific Team Cerumo	6	0	0	0	0	12	15th
1997	24 Hours of Le Mans	Kremer Racing	1	0	0	0	0	N/A	DNF

=== Complete British Formula Three Chammpionship results ===
(key)

Year	Entrant	Engine	Class	1	2	3	4	5	6	7	8	9	10	11	12	13	14	15	16	17	18	19	DC	Pts
1987	West Surrey Racing	Alfa Romeo	A	SIL; C	THR; 2	BRH; Ret	SIL; 2	THR; 14	SIL; 3	BRH; 1	THR; 2	SIL; 3	ZAN; 4	DON; Ret	SIL; 1	SNE; Ret	DON; 9	OUL; 4	SIL; 4	BRH; Ret	SPA; 19	THR; 1	**2nd**	**64**

=== Complete International Formula 3000 results ===
(key) (Races in bold indicate pole position) (Races in italics indicate fastest lap)

Year	Entrant	1	2	3	4	5	6	7	8	9	10	11	DC	Points
1988	Spirit/TOM's Racing	JER; Ret	VAL; 2	PAU; Ret	**SIL**; 2	MNZ; Ret	PER; Ret	BRH; Ret	BIR; 5	BUG; 4	ZOL; 6	DIJ; 4	5th	21

=== Complete Formula One results ===
(key)

Year	Entrant	Chassis	Engine	1	2	3	4	5	6	7	8	9	10	11	12	13	14	15	16	17	WDC	Points
1989	Moneytron Onyx Formula One	Onyx ORE-1	Ford DFR 3.5 V8	BRA; DNPQ	SMR; DNPQ	MON; DNPQ	MEX; DNPQ	USA; DNPQ	CAN; DNPQ	FRA; 13	GBR; 12	GER; DNQ	HUN; Ret	BEL; Ret	ITA; Ret	POR	ESP				NC	0
1989	Rial Racing	Rial ARC2	Ford DFR 3.5 V8															JPN; DNQ	AUS; DNQ		NC	0
1990	Subaru Coloni Racing	Coloni C3B	Subaru 1235 F12	USA; DNPQ	BRA; DNPQ	SMR; DNPQ	MON; DNPQ	CAN; DNPQ	MEX; DNPQ	FRA; DNPQ	GBR; DNPQ										NC	0
1990	Coloni Racing Srl	Coloni C3C	Ford DFR 3.5 V8									GER; DNPQ	HUN; DNPQ	BEL; DNQ	ITA; DNQ	POR; DNQ	ESP; DNQ	JPN; DNQ	AUS; DNQ		NC	0
1991	Team 7UP Jordan	Jordan 191	Ford HB4 3.5 V8	USA; 10	BRA; 13	SMR; Ret	MON; 8	CAN; 5	MEX; Ret	FRA; Ret	GBR; 6	GER; 6	HUN; 9	BEL	ITA	POR	ESP	JPN			13th	4
1991	Larrousse F1	Lola LC91	Ford DFR 3.5 V8																AUS; DNQ		13th	4
1992	Central Park Venturi Larrousse	Venturi Larrousse LC92	Lamborghini 3512 3.5 V12	RSA; Ret	MEX; 11	BRA; Ret	ESP; Ret	SMR; Ret	MON; 6	CAN; DSQ	FRA; Ret	GBR; Ret	GER; 14	HUN; Ret	BEL; 18	ITA; Ret	POR; Ret	JPN; Ret	AUS; Ret		19th	1
1994	Pacific Grand Prix Ltd	Pacific PR01	Ilmor 2175A 3.5 V10	BRA; Ret	PAC; DNQ	SMR; Ret	MON; Ret	ESP; Ret	CAN; Ret	FRA; DNQ	GBR; DNQ	GER; DNQ	HUN; DNQ	BEL; DNQ	ITA; DNQ	POR; DNQ	EUR; DNQ	JPN; DNQ	AUS; DNQ		NC	0
1995	Pacific Team Lotus	Pacific PR02	Ford EDC 3.0 V8	BRA; Ret	ARG; Ret	SMR; Ret	ESP; Ret	MON; Ret	CAN; Ret	FRA; Ret	GBR; 12	GER	HUN	BEL	ITA	POR	EUR	PAC; Ret	JPN; Ret	AUS; 8	NC	0

=== Complete 24 Hours of Le Mans results ===
Year	Team	Co-Drivers	Car	Class	Laps	Pos.	Class Pos.
1990	(Japan) Mazdaspeed Co. Ltd.	(Germany) Volker Weidler (United Kingdom) Johnny Herbert	Mazda 787	GTP	148	DNF	DNF
1991	(Japan) Mazdaspeed Co. Ltd.	(Germany) Volker Weidler (United Kingdom) Johnny Herbert	Mazda 787B	C2	362	**1st**	**1st**
1992	(Japan) Mazdaspeed Co. Ltd. (France) Oreca	(United Kingdom) Johnny Herbert (Germany) Volker Weidler (Brazil) Maurizio Sandro Sala	Mazda MXR-01	C1	336	4th	4th
1994	(Germany) Kremer Honda Racing	(Germany) Armin Hahne (France) Christophe Bouchut	Honda NSX	GT2	257	14th	6th
1995	(Japan) Honda Motor Co. Ltd.	(Germany) Armin Hahne (Italy) Ivan Capelli	Honda NSX GT1	GT1	7	DNF	DNF
1997	(Germany) Kremer Racing	(France) Christophe Bouchut (United States) Andy Evans	Porsche 911 GT1	GT1	207	DNF	DNF

=== American Open Wheel racing results ===
(key)

==== CART ====
Year	Team	No.	1	2	3	4	5	6	7	8	9	10	11	12	13	14	15	16	Rank	Points	Ref
1993	Dick Simon Racing	90	SRF	PHX	LBH	INDY	MIL	DET	POR	CLE	TOR; 12	MIS	NHM	ROA	VAN	MDO	NZR	LS	**34th**	**1**	

=== Complete JGTC results ===
(key)

Year	Team	Car	Class	1	2	3	4	5	6	DC	Pts
1996	FET Racing Team	Toyota Supra	GT500	SUZ	FUJ	SEN	FUJ; 4	SUG; 14	MIN; 7	13th	14
1997	Power Craft	Toyota Supra	GT500	SUZ; 11	FUJ; Ret					15th	12
1997	Ryowa House Pacific Team Cerumo	Toyota Supra	GT500			SEN; 8	FUJ; 5	MIN; Ret	SUG; 11	15th	12

Sporting positions
Preceded by John Nielsen; Price Cobb; Martin Brundle	Winner of the 24 Hours of Le Mans; 1991; With: Volker Weidler & Johnny Herbert	Succeeded by Derek Warwick; Yannick Dalmas; Mark Blundell
