= Pacific PR02 =

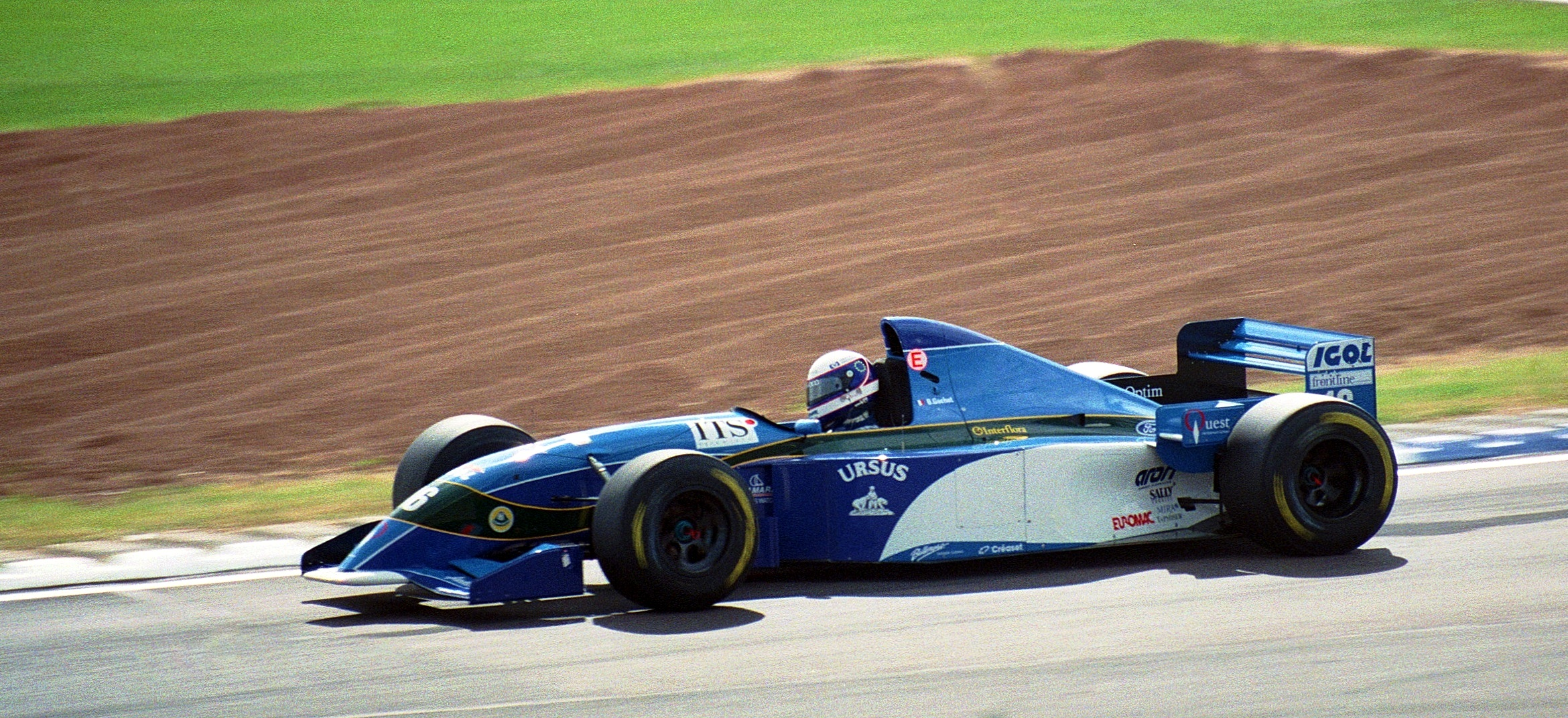
- Bertrand Gachot driving the PR02 at the 1995 British Grand Prix
- Category: Formula One
- Constructor: Pacific Grand Prix
- Designers: Frank Coppuck (Chief Designer); Dave Watson (Head of Aerodynamics)
- Predecessor: PR01

Technical specifications
- Suspension (front): Push rod
- Suspension (rear): Push rod
- Engine: Ford-Cosworth EDC1, 2999cc, 75-degree V8, naturally-aspirated
- Transmission: Pacific 6-speed semi-automatic longitudinal
- Power: 630 hp @ 13,200 rpm
- Fuel: Elf
- Tyres: Goodyear

Competition history
- Notable entrants: Pacific Team Lotus
- Notable drivers: 16. (France) Bertrand Gachot; 16. (Italy) Giovanni Lavaggi; 16. (Switzerland) Jean-Denis Delétraz; 17. (Italy) Andrea Montermini; TD. (United Kingdom) Oliver Gavin
- Debut: 1995 Brazilian Grand Prix
- Last event: 1995 Australian Grand Prix
Races	Wins	Poles	F/Laps
17	0	0	0
- Constructors' Championships: 0
- Drivers' Championships: 0

The Pacific PR02 was a Formula One car designed by Frank Coppuck for use by the Pacific team in the 1995 Formula One World Championship. The car was powered by a 3-litre Ford EDC V8 engine. The number 17 car was driven by Andrea Montermini, and the number 16 car was driven by team shareholder Bertrand Gachot, and later pay drivers Giovanni Lavaggi and Jean-Denis Delétraz, before Gachot returned. The team's test driver was Oliver Gavin. The team did not have a main sponsor.

While the car's performance was an improvement over its predecessor, the PR02 suffered from poor reliability, finishing seven times in thirty-four starts. Out of these seven times, it finished last on two occasions and was not classified on another two occasions.

The team finished last in the Constructors' Championship, with no points, and withdrew from Formula One at the end of 1995.

== Complete Formula One results ==
(key)

Year	Entrant	Engine	Tyres	Drivers	1	2	3	4	5	6	7	8	9	10	11	12	13	14	15	16	17	Points	WCC
1995	Pacific Team Lotus	Ford ED V8	G		BRA	ARG	SMR	ESP	MON	CAN	FRA	GBR	GER	HUN	BEL	ITA	POR	EUR	PAC	JPN	AUS	0	NC
1995	Pacific Team Lotus	Ford ED V8	G	Bertrand Gachot	Ret	Ret	Ret	Ret	Ret	Ret	Ret	12							Ret	Ret	8	0	NC
1995	Pacific Team Lotus	Ford ED V8	G	Giovanni Lavaggi									Ret	Ret	Ret	Ret						0	NC
1995	Pacific Team Lotus	Ford ED V8	G	Jean-Denis Delétraz													Ret	15				0	NC
1995	Pacific Team Lotus	Ford ED V8	G	Andrea Montermini	9	Ret	Ret	DNS	DSQ	Ret	NC	Ret	8	12	Ret	DNS	Ret	Ret	Ret	Ret	Ret	0	NC
