= Lotus in Formula One =

Lotus in Formula One can refer to:

- Team Lotus, the original Lotus team that competed from 1954 to 1994
- Pacific Team Lotus, competing in 1995
- Team Lotus (2010–2011)
- Lotus F1, a team that competed from 2012 to 2015, later purchased by Groupe Renault
