= Paul Belmondo (racing driver) =

French racing driver and actor (born 1963)

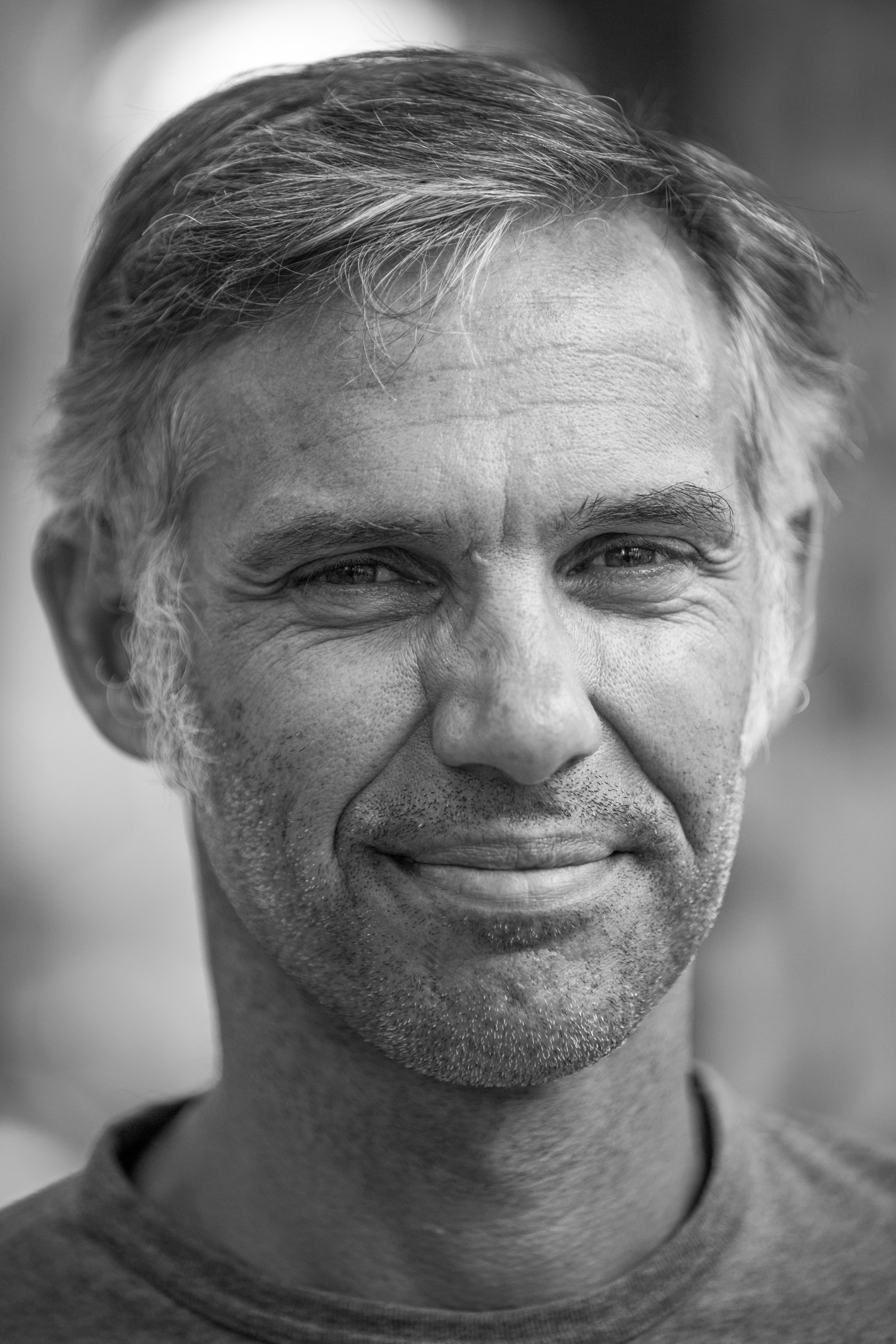
- Belmondo in July 2013
- Born: Paul Alexandre Belmondo; 23 April 1963 (age 63); Boulogne-Billancourt, Hauts-de-Seine, France
- Relatives: Jean-Paul Belmondo (father); Paul Belmondo (grandfather)

Formula One World Championship career
- Nationality: (France) French
- Active years: 1992, 1994
- Team(s): March, Pacific
- Entries: 27 (7 starts)
- Championships: 0
- Wins: 0
- Podiums: 0
- Career points: 0
- Pole positions: 0
- Fastest laps: 0
- First entry: 1992 South African Grand Prix
- Last entry: 1994 Australian Grand Prix

Paul Alexandre Belmondo (born 23 April 1963) is a French racing driver and actor who raced in Formula One for the March and Pacific Racing teams.

In 1982 he trained at Winfield Racing School, and graduated as the top student with the prestigious Volant Elf Competition Scholarship. Through 1987, Belmondo participated in Formula 3 and Formula 3000, although he was never a top-ten championship finisher in either. In 1992, he joined the March F1 team as a pay driver, getting a ninth place at the Hungarian Grand Prix, but only qualifying four more times before he ran out of money and was replaced by Emanuele Naspetti. Two years later, he became a member of the uncompetitive Pacific Grand Prix team, where he only qualified for two races and was usually behind teammate Bertrand Gachot. Thereafter, he concentrated on GT racing, at the wheel of a Chrysler Viper GTS-R. He started his own team, Paul Belmondo Racing, which raced in the FIA GT Championship and Le Mans Endurance Series championship before folding in 2007.

== Racing record ==
=== 24 Hours of Le Mans results ===
Year	Team	Co-Drivers	Car	Class	Laps	Pos.	Class Pos.
1985	(Germany) New Man-Joest Racing	(Colombia) Mauricio de Narváez (United States) Kenper Miller	Porsche 956	C1	277	DNF	DNF
1987	(Switzerland) Brun Motorsport	(France) Michel Trollé (France) Pierre de Thoisy	Porsche 962C	C1	88	DNF	DNF
1988	(France) Courage Compétition	(France) François Migault (Japan) Ukyo Katayama	Courage C22-Porsche	C1	66	DNF	DNF
1989	(Germany) Obermaier Racing (France) Primagaz Competition	(Germany) Jürgen Lässig (France) Pierre Yver	Porsche 962C	C1	61	DNF	DNF
1993	(United Kingdom) TWR Jaguar Racing	(United States) Jay Cochran (Germany) Andreas Fuchs	Jaguar XJ220	GT	176	DNF	DNF
1995	(France) Venturi Automobiles SA	(France) Jean-Marc Gounon (France) Arnaud Trévisol	Venturi 600LM	GT1	193	NC	NC
1996	(Italy) Ennea SRL Igol	(France) Jean-Marc Gounon (France) Éric Bernard	Ferrari F40 GTE	GT1	40	DNF	DNF
1999	(France) Paul Belmondo Racing	(Portugal) Tiago Monteiro (France) Marc Rostan	Chrysler Viper GTS-R	GTS	299	17th	6th
2004	(France) Paul Belmondo Racing	(France) Claude-Yves Gosselin (France) Marco Saviozzi	Courage C65-JPX	LMP2	80	DNF	DNF
2005	(France) Paul Belmondo Racing	(France) Didier André (United States) Rick Sutherland	Courage C65-Ford	LMP2	294	22nd	**3rd**

=== Complete International Formula 3000 results ===
(key) (Races in bold indicate pole position; races in italics indicate fastest lap.)

Year	Entrant	1	2	3	4	5	6	7	8	9	10	11	DC	Points
1987	GBDA Motorsport	SIL; 18	VAL; 16	SPA; 11	PAU; 5	DON; 15	PER; Ret	BRH; 12	BIR; 12	IMO; DNQ	BUG; Ret	JAR; 11	18th	2
1988	Lola Motorsport	JER; Ret	VAL; 14	PAU; Ret	SIL; DNQ	MNZ; 8	PER; DNQ	BRH; DNQ	BIR; 9	BUG; 8	ZOL; Ret	DIJ; 11	NC	0
1989	CDM	SIL; 13	VAL; Ret	PAU; Ret	JER; Ret	PER; Ret	BRH; 12	BIR; Ret	SPA; 10	BUG; Ret	DIJ; 18		NC	0
1990	Superpower	DON; Ret	SIL; DNQ	PAU; DNQ	JER; Ret	MNZ; Ret	PER; DNQ	HOC; 11	BRH; Ret	BIR; Ret	BUG; 6	NOG; Ret	23rd	1
1991	Apomatox	VAL; 14	PAU; Ret	JER; 14	MUG; 13	PER; Ret	HOC; Ret	BRH; DNQ	SPA; 12	BUG; Ret	NOG; Ret		NC	0

=== Complete Formula One results ===
(key)

Year	Entrant	Chassis	Engine	1	2	3	4	5	6	7	8	9	10	11	12	13	14	15	16	WDC	Points
1992	March F1	March CG911	Ilmor V10	RSA; DNQ	MEX; DNQ	BRA; DNQ	ESP; 12	SMR; 13	MON; DNQ	CAN; 14	FRA; DNQ	GBR; DNQ	GER; 13	HUN; 9	BEL	ITA	POR	JPN	AUS	NC	0
1994	Pacific Grand Prix	Pacific PR01	Ilmor V10	BRA; DNQ	PAC; DNQ	SMR; DNQ	MON; Ret	ESP; Ret	CAN; DNQ	FRA; DNQ	GBR; DNQ	GER; DNQ	HUN; DNQ	BEL; DNQ	ITA; DNQ	POR; DNQ	EUR; DNQ	JPN; DNQ	AUS; DNQ	NC	0

=== Complete JGTC results ===
(key)

Year	Team	Car	Class	1	2	3	4	5	6	DC	Pts	Ref
1997	Power Craft	Toyota Supra	GT500	SUZ; 11	FUJ; Ret					15th	12	
1997	Ryowa House Pacific Team Cerumo	Toyota Supra	GT500			SEN; 8	FUJ; 5	MIN; Ret	SUG; 11	15th	12	

== Personal life ==
Belmondo was born in Boulogne-Billancourt, in the Hauts-de-Seine department, the son of actor Jean-Paul Belmondo and grandson of sculptor Paul Belmondo.

Around 1981, Belmondo gained publicity for becoming the lover of Princess Stéphanie of Monaco. Belmondo married Luana Tenca (born Rome, 18 March 1971) in 1990. Luana Belmondo is a former model who is now a TV chef and broadcaster. The couple have three children including Victor, an actor. In June 2024, Tenca and Belmondo announced that they had separated in January and had filed for divorce.
