= Ursus (vodka) =

Icelandic-Dutch vodka

Ursus Vodka is a vodka of Icelandic origin that was made in Hoorn, Netherlands until 2006. The name is Latin for "bear."

The recipe was developed by a traditional Icelandic distiller family in the early twentieth century. Since 1995 it was distilled and bottled by Distillery De Hoorn BV in Hoorn in the Netherlands. Ursus Vodka was distributed by Ursus Vodka Company NV. In 2004, the brand Ursus was taken over by Diageo, where it is produced today.

The distillery produced straight vodka as well as flavored versions Ursus Roter (sloeberry), Ursus Lemon and Ursus Blackcurrant.

In 1994 Ursus was the main sponsor of the Pacific Formula One team, and the brand continued its sponsorship into 1995.
