= 2008 International GT Open =

Seasons
- ← 2007 2009 →

The 2008 International GT Open season was the third season of the International GT Open, the grand tourer-style sports car racing founded in 2006 by the Spanish GT Sport Organización. It began on 19 April at ACI Vallelunga Circuit and finished on 2 November, at Barcelona after eight double-header meetings.

Overall championship and GTA class was won by Scuderia Playteam SaraFree drivers Michele Maceratesi and Andrea Montermini, while GTS class title was clinched by Marco Cioci and Andrea Pellizzato.

== Race calendar and results ==
Round		Circuit	Date	Pole position	GTA Winner	GTS Winner
1	R1	(Italy) ACI Vallelunga Circuit, Campagnano di Roma	19 April	(Italy) No. 3 Scuderia Playteam SaraFree	(Italy) No. 3 Scuderia Playteam SaraFree	(Italy) No. 54 Racing Box
1	R1	(Italy) ACI Vallelunga Circuit, Campagnano di Roma	19 April	(Italy) Michele Maceratesi (Italy) Andrea Montermini	(Italy) Michele Maceratesi (Italy) Andrea Montermini	(Italy) Andrea Ceccato (Italy) Marco Visconti
1	R2	(Italy) ACI Vallelunga Circuit, Campagnano di Roma	20 April	(Italy) No. 1 Autorlando	(Italy) No. 10 Advanced Engineering	(Italy) No. 65 Twentytwo
1	R2	(Italy) ACI Vallelunga Circuit, Campagnano di Roma	20 April	(Austria) Richard Lietz (Italy) Gianluca Roda	(Italy) Alessandro Bonetti (France) Damien Pasini	(Italy) Marco Cioci (Italy) Andrea Pellizzato
2	R1	(Spain) Circuit Ricardo Tormo, Cheste	17 May	(Italy) No. 4 Scuderia Playteam SaraFree	(Italy) No. 1 Autorlando	(Italy) No. 54 Racing Box
2	R1	(Spain) Circuit Ricardo Tormo, Cheste	17 May	(Portugal) Pedro Couceiro (Portugal) Manuel Gião	(Austria) Richard Lietz (Italy) Gianluca Roda	(Italy) Andrea Ceccato (Italy) Marco Visconti
2	R2	(Spain) Circuit Ricardo Tormo, Cheste	18 May	(Italy) No. 3 Scuderia Playteam SaraFree	(Italy) No. 3 Scuderia Playteam SaraFree	(Italy) No. 54 Racing Box
2	R2	(Spain) Circuit Ricardo Tormo, Cheste	18 May	(Italy) Michele Maceratesi (Italy) Andrea Montermini	(Italy) Michele Maceratesi (Italy) Andrea Montermini	(Italy) Andrea Ceccato (Italy) Marco Visconti
3	R1	(Belgium) Circuit de Spa-Francorchamps, Spa	31 May	(Switzerland) No. 23 Trottet Racing	(Switzerland) No. 23 Trottet Racing	(Italy) No. 58 Mik Corse
3	R1	(Belgium) Circuit de Spa-Francorchamps, Spa	31 May	(Switzerland) Henri Moser (Switzerland) Marcel Fässler	(Switzerland) Henri Moser (Switzerland) Marcel Fässler	(Italy) Enrico Moncada (Italy) Giacomo Piccini
3	R2	(Belgium) Circuit de Spa-Francorchamps, Spa	1 June	(Italy) No. 1 Autorlando	(Italy) No. 11 Advanced Engineering	(Italy) No. 57 Villois Racing
3	R2	(Belgium) Circuit de Spa-Francorchamps, Spa	1 June	(Austria) Richard Lietz (Italy) Gianluca Roda	(Italy) Maurizio Mediani (Italy) Michele Rugolo	(Italy) Giacomo Ricci (Italy) Massimiliano Wiser
4	R1	(Portugal) Autódromo do Estoril, Estoril	12 July	(Italy) No. 3 Scuderia Playteam SaraFree	(Italy) No. 3 Scuderia Playteam SaraFree	not held
4	R1	(Portugal) Autódromo do Estoril, Estoril	12 July	(Italy) Michele Maceratesi (Italy) Andrea Montermini	(Italy) Michele Maceratesi (Italy) Andrea Montermini	not held
4	R2	(Portugal) Autódromo do Estoril, Estoril	13 July	(Italy) No. 1 Autorlando	(Italy) No. 1 Autorlando	not held
4	R2	(Portugal) Autódromo do Estoril, Estoril	13 July	(Austria) Richard Lietz (Italy) Gianluca Roda	(Austria) Richard Lietz (Italy) Gianluca Roda	not held
5	R1	(Spain) Valencia Street Circuit, Valencia	27 July	(Italy) No. 3 Scuderia Playteam SaraFree	(Switzerland) No. 23 Trottet Racing	(Italy) No. 52 Scuderia Latorre
5	R1	(Spain) Valencia Street Circuit, Valencia	27 July	(Italy) Michele Maceratesi (Italy) Andrea Montermini	(Switzerland) Henri Moser (Switzerland) Marcel Fässler	(United Kingdom) Mike Conway (China) Ho-Pin Tung
5	R2	(Spain) Valencia Street Circuit, Valencia	28 July	(Italy) No. 3 Scuderia Playteam SaraFree	(Italy) No. 1 Autorlando	(Spain) No. 61 Roger Racing
5	R2	(Spain) Valencia Street Circuit, Valencia	28 July	(Italy) Michele Maceratesi (Italy) Andrea Montermini	(Austria) Richard Lietz (Italy) Gianluca Roda	(Spain) Miquel Julià Perello (Spain) José Luis López-Pampló
6	R1	(France) Circuit de Nevers Magny-Cours, Magny-Cours	20 September	(Switzerland) No. 23 Trottet Racing	(Switzerland) No. 23 Trottet Racing	(Italy) No. 65 Twentytwo
6	R1	(France) Circuit de Nevers Magny-Cours, Magny-Cours	20 September	(Switzerland) Henri Moser (Switzerland) Marcel Fässler	(Switzerland) Henri Moser (Switzerland) Marcel Fässler	(Italy) Marco Cioci (Italy) Andrea Pellizzato
6	R2	(France) Circuit de Nevers Magny-Cours, Magny-Cours	21 September	(Italy) No. 3 Scuderia Playteam SaraFree	(Italy) No. 1 Autorlando	(France) No. 81 David Tuchbant
6	R2	(France) Circuit de Nevers Magny-Cours, Magny-Cours	21 September	(Italy) Michele Maceratesi (Italy) Andrea Montermini	(Austria) Richard Lietz (Italy) Gianluca Roda	(France) Ulric Amado (France) David Tuchbant
7	R1	(Italy) Autodromo Nazionale Monza	4 October	(Italy) No. 3 Scuderia Playteam SaraFree	(Italy) No. 12 Advanced Engineering	(Italy) No. 65 Twentytwo
7	R1	(Italy) Autodromo Nazionale Monza	4 October	(Italy) Michele Maceratesi (Italy) Andrea Montermini	(United Kingdom) Peter Bamford (Republic of Ireland) Matt Griffin	(Italy) Marco Cioci (Italy) Andrea Pellizzato
7	R2	(Italy) Autodromo Nazionale Monza	5 October	(Italy) No. 1 Autorlando	(Italy) No. 1 Autorlando	(Italy) No. 65 Twentytwo
7	R2	(Italy) Autodromo Nazionale Monza	5 October	(Austria) Richard Lietz (Italy) Gianluca Roda	(Austria) Richard Lietz (Italy) Gianluca Roda	(Italy) Marco Cioci (Italy) Andrea Pellizzato
8	R1	(Spain) Circuit de Catalunya, Montmeló	1 November	(Italy) No. 14 Advanced Engineering	(Italy) No. 3 Scuderia Playteam SaraFree	(France) No. 81 David Tuchbant
8	R1	(Spain) Circuit de Catalunya, Montmeló	1 November	(Portugal) Rui Águas (Croatia) Boris Maletić	(Italy) Michele Maceratesi (Italy) Andrea Montermini	(France) Arnaud Peyroles (France) David Tuchbant
8	R2	(Spain) Circuit de Catalunya, Montmeló	2 November	(Italy) No. 10 Advanced Engineering	(Italy) No. 3 Scuderia Playteam SaraFree	(Italy) No. 55 Mik Corse
8	R2	(Spain) Circuit de Catalunya, Montmeló	2 November	(Italy) Alessandro Bonetti (France) Damien Pasini	(Italy) Michele Maceratesi (Italy) Andrea Montermini	(Italy) Ferdinando Geri (Italy) Giacomo Piccini
