= Andrea Montermini =

Italian racing driver (born 1964)

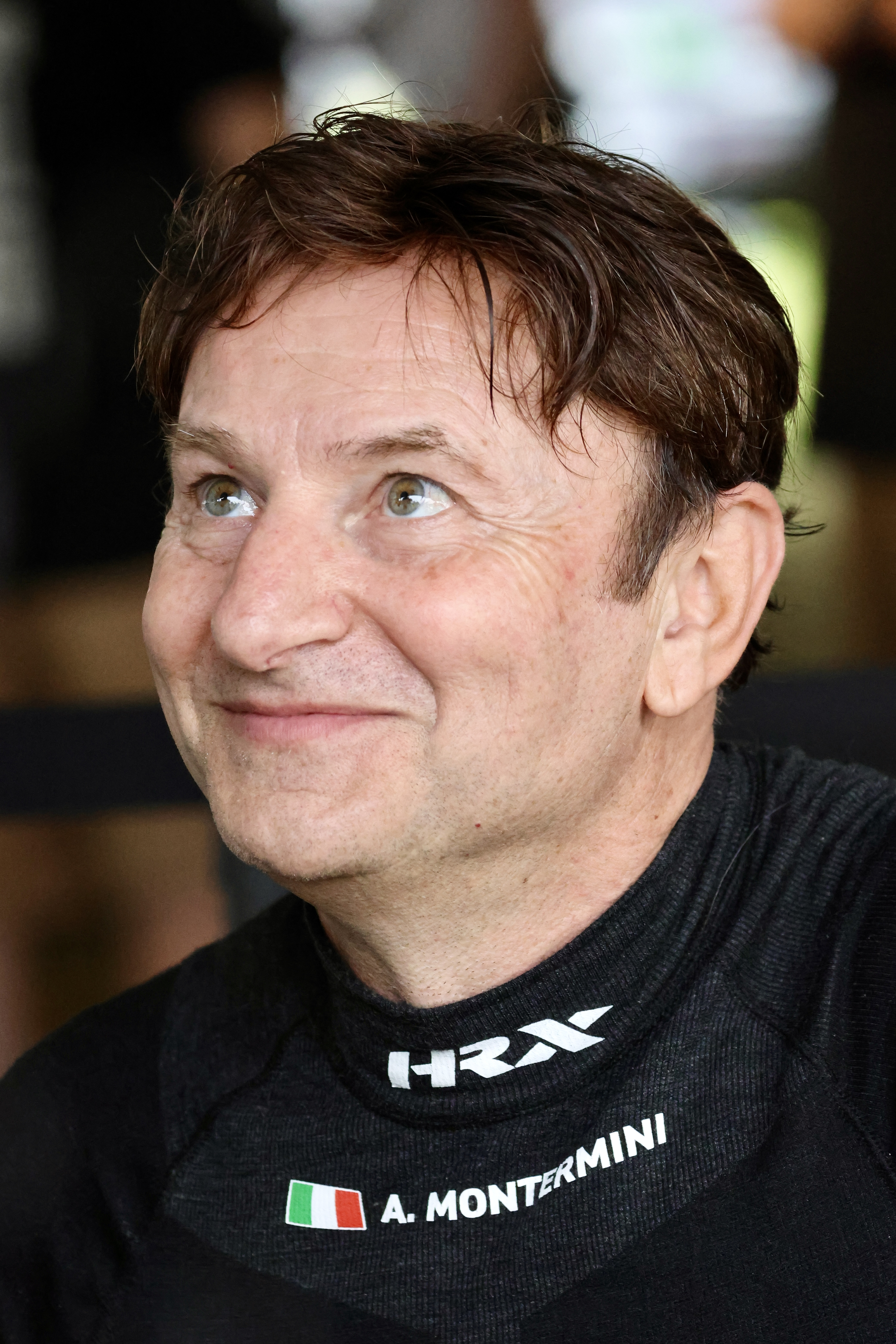
- Montermini at the 2026 Adelaide Motorsport Festival
- Born: 30 May 1964 (age 62) Sassuolo, Italy
- Categorisation: FIA Platinum (until 2014); FIA Gold (2015–2019); FIA Silver (2020–)

Formula One World Championship career
- Nationality: (Italy) Italian
- Active years: 1994–1996
- Team(s): Simtek, Pacific, Forti
- Entries: 29 (19 starts)
- Championships: 0
- Wins: 0
- Podiums: 0
- Career points: 0
- Pole positions: 0
- Fastest laps: 0
- First entry: 1994 Spanish Grand Prix
- Last entry: 1996 German Grand Prix

Andrea Montermini (born 30 May 1964) is an Italian racing driver. He drove in Formula One from 1994 to 1996.

== Career ==
Montermini raced in Formula 3 in 1989, taking second place in the Monaco GP support race and fourth in the Italian F3 Championship. He then moved up to Formula 3000, racing for three seasons before finally taking second place in the 1992 season, winning three rounds while driving for the Il Barone Rampante team.

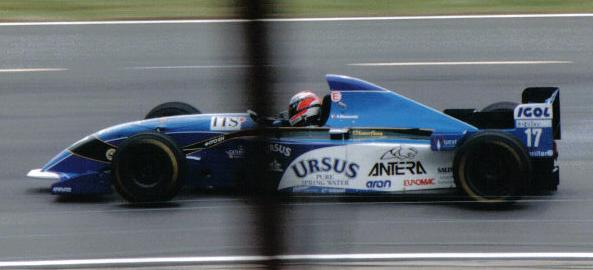
Montermini driving for Pacific Racing at the 1995 British Grand Prix.

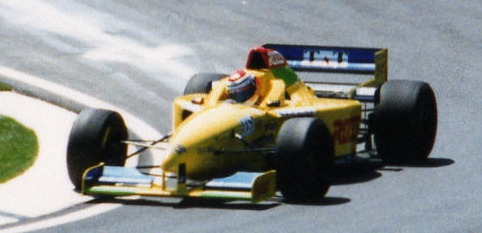
Montermini driving for Forti at the 1996 San Marino Grand Prix.

Montermini participated in 29 Formula One Grands Prix, debuting on 29 May 1994 for Simtek, replacing Roland Ratzenberger, who had been killed during qualifying for the 1994 San Marino Grand Prix. Montermini himself crashed heavily in practice for the 1994 Spanish Grand Prix, breaking his left heel and his right foot. He returned to Formula One the next season, with the Pacific Grand Prix team, and drove for Forti in 1996 alongside countryman Luca Badoer until the team folded. For the 1997 season, Montermini was signed as test driver for the MasterCard Lola team, but it folded after one race. He scored no points in his Formula One career. As of 2024, he holds the record for the shortest F1 driver of all time, at a height of 1.57m (5ft 1in) tall.

Montermini competed in the American Champ Car series three different seasons: 1993–1994 and 1999. He scored a fourth place at Detroit in his first season, driving for the underfunded Euromotorsport team. In 1999 he drove a few events for Dan Gurney in Gurney's last season of team ownership. When others such as Alex Barron, Gualter Salles and Raul Boesel were replaced, he filled in and scored a best finish of 11th in Vancouver.

Montermini raced in the 2001 24 Hours of Daytona, but has primarily raced in the FIA GT Championship, mostly in Ferrari cars. He has taken two class wins and four further class podiums. In 2006, he has occasionally raced alongside Jarek Janis and Sascha Bert in a Saleen ran by the Zakspeed team. In 2007, he won the International GT Open's GTA class, driving a Ferrari 430 for Scuderia Playteam alongside co-champion Michele Maceratesi, the duo becoming overall champions the following season. He won a second overall championship title in 2013. In 2010 he also won the Italian GT Championship in the GT2 class.

== Racing record ==
=== Complete International Formula 3000 results ===
(key) (Races in bold indicate pole position; races in italics indicate fastest lap.)

Year	Entrant	1	2	3	4	5	6	7	8	9	10	11	DC	Points
1990	Madgwick International	**DON**; Ret	SIL; 4	PAU; Ret	JER; 3	MNZ; Ret	PER; Ret	HOC; Ret	BRH; Ret	BIR; 9	BUG; 2	NOG; Ret	8th	13
1991	3001 International	VAL; Ret	PAU; Ret	JER; 3	MUG; 11	PER; 10	**HOC**; Ret	BRH; 10	SPA; Ret	BUG; 3	NOG; Ret		10th	8
1992	Il Barone Rampante	SIL; Ret	**PAU**; Ret	**CAT**; 1	PER; 3	HOC; 9	NÜR; Ret						**2nd**	**34**
1992	Forti Corse							**SPA**; 1	ALB; 1	NOG; 4	MAG; Ret		**2nd**	**34**

=== American open wheel racing results ===
(key)

==== CART ====
Year	Team	No.	Chassis	Engine	1	2	3	4	5	6	7	8	9	10	11	12	13	14	15	16	17	18	19	20	Rank	Points	Ref
1993	Euromotorsport	50	Lola T92/00	Chevrolet 265A V8t	SRF; 25	PHX	LBH	INDY	MIL	DET; 4	POR	CLE	TOR; 27	MIS	NHM	ROA	VAN; 19	MDO	NZR	LS					**18th**	**12**	
1994	Payton/Coyne Racing	39	Lola T93/00	Ford XB V8t	SRF; DNS	PHX	LBH	INDY	MIL	DET	POR														**24th**	**10**	
1994	King Racing	60	Lola T94/00	Ford XB V8t								CLE; 16	TOR; 7	MIS	MDO	NHM	VAN	ROA	NZR						**24th**	**10**	
1994	Project Indy	64	Lola T93/00	Ford XB V8t																LS; 9					**24th**	**10**	
1999	All American Racers	36	Eagle 997	Toyota RV8D V8t	MIA	MOT	LBH	NZR	RIO	STL	MIL	POR	CLE	ROA	TOR	MIS	DET	MDO	CHI	VAN; 11	LS; 24	HOU; 23	SRF; 15	FON	**31st**	**2**	

=== Complete Formula One results ===
(key)

Year	Entrant	Chassis	Engine	1	2	3	4	5	6	7	8	9	10	11	12	13	14	15	16	17	WDC	Points
1994	MTV Simtek Ford	Simtek S941	Ford HBD 6 3.5 V8	BRA	PAC	SMR	MON	ESP; DNQ	CAN	FRA	GBR	GER	HUN	BEL	ITA	POR	EUR	JPN	AUS		NC	0
1995	Pacific Grand Prix	Pacific PR02	Ford ED 3.0 V8	BRA; 9	ARG; Ret	SMR; Ret	ESP; DNS	MON; DSQ	CAN; Ret	FRA; NC	GBR; Ret	GER; 8	HUN; 12	BEL; Ret	ITA; DNS	POR; Ret	EUR; Ret	PAC; Ret	JPN; Ret	AUS; Ret	NC	0
1996	Forti Grand Prix	Forti FG01B	Ford Zetec-R 3.0 V8	AUS; DNQ	BRA; Ret	ARG; 10	EUR; DNQ	SMR; DNQ													NC	0
1996	Forti Grand Prix	Forti FG03	Ford Zetec-R 3.0 V8						MON; DNS	ESP; DNQ	CAN; Ret	FRA; Ret	GBR; DNQ	GER; DNP	HUN	BEL	ITA	POR	JPN		NC	0

=== 24 Hours of Le Mans results ===
Year	Team	Co-Drivers	Car	Class	Laps	Pos.	Class Pos.
1998	(Japan) Nissan Motorsports (United Kingdom) TWR	(Netherlands) Jan Lammers (France) Érik Comas	Nissan R390 GT1	GT1	342	6th	6th
1999	(France) Courage Compétition	(Italy) Alex Caffi (Italy) Domenico Schiattarella	Courage C52-Nissan	LMP	342	6th	5th

Sporting positions
Preceded by Joël Camathias; Richard Lietz	International GT Open; Champion; 2008; With: Michele Maceratesi	Succeeded by Joël Camathias; Marcel Fässler
Preceded by Federico Leo; Gianmaria Bruni	International GT Open; Champion; 2013	Succeeded by Roman Mavlanov; Daniel Zampieri
