= 1994 San Marino Grand Prix =

Formula One motor race held in 1994

Race 3 of 16 in the 1994 Formula One World Championship
← Previous race	Next race →
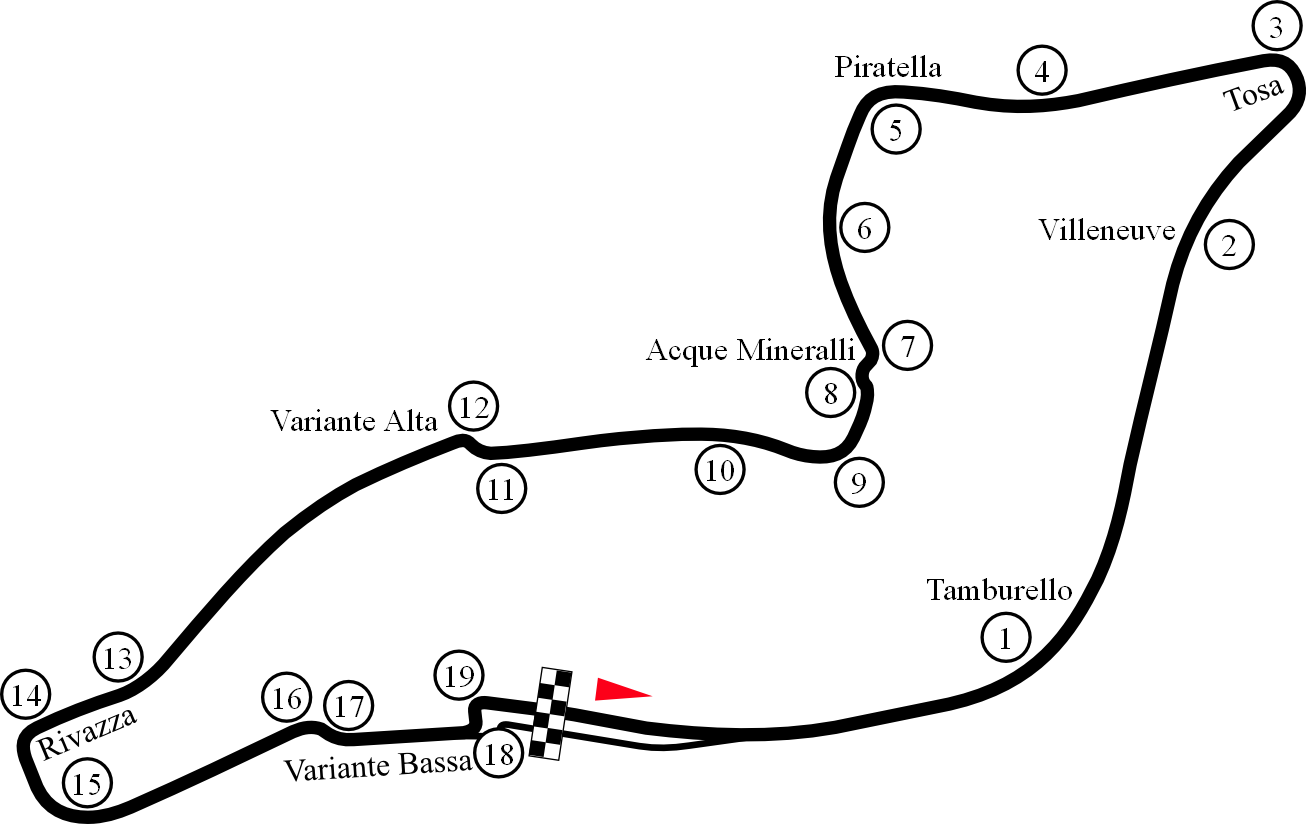

Race details
- Date: 1 May 1994
- Official name: 14º Gran Premio di San Marino
- Location: Autodromo Enzo e Dino Ferrari, Imola, Emilia-Romagna, Italy
- Course: Permanent racing facility
- Course length: 5.040 km (3.144 miles)
- Distance: 58 laps, 292.320 km (182.351 miles)
- Scheduled distance: 61 laps, 307.440 km (191.784 miles)
- Weather: Sunny

Pole position
Driver	(Brazil) Ayrton Senna	Williams-Renault
- Time: 1:21.548

Fastest lap
Driver	(United Kingdom) Damon Hill	Williams-Renault
- Time: 1:24.335 on lap 10

Podium
First	(Germany) Michael Schumacher	Benetton-Ford
Second	(Italy) Nicola Larini	Ferrari
Third	(Finland) Mika Häkkinen	McLaren-Peugeot

The 1994 San Marino Grand Prix (formally the 14º Gran Premio di San Marino) was a Formula One motor race held on 1 May 1994 at the Autodromo Enzo e Dino Ferrari, located in Imola, Italy. It was the third race of the 1994 Formula One World Championship. Michael Schumacher, driving for Benetton, won the race. Nicola Larini, driving for Ferrari, scored the first points of his career when he finished in second position. Mika Häkkinen finished third in a McLaren.

Austrian rookie Roland Ratzenberger and Brazilian three-time world champion Ayrton Senna lost their lives in separate accidents during the event. In addition to the two fatalities, other incidents saw injuries to driver Rubens Barrichello plus several mechanics and spectators. The deaths were the first fatalities in the Formula One World Championship since the 1982 Canadian Grand Prix, and the first with two driver deaths since the 1960 Belgian Grand Prix. Senna was given a state funeral in his home town of São Paulo, Brazil, where around 500,000 people (some estimates put the number at 2 million) lined the streets to watch the coffin pass. Italian prosecutors charged six people with manslaughter in connection with Senna's death: Frank Williams, Adrian Newey, Patrick Head, Federico Bendinelli, Giorgio Poggi, and Roland Bruynseraede, all of whom were later acquitted. The case took more than 11 years to conclude due to an appeal and a retrial following the original verdict of not guilty.

These tragedies proved to be a major turning point in both the 1994 season, and in the development of Formula One itself, particularly with regard to safety. This led to a reforming of the Grand Prix Drivers' Association after a 12-year hiatus, and the changing of many track layouts and car designs. Since the race, numerous regulation changes have been made to slow Formula One cars down and new circuits incorporate large run-off areas to slow cars before they collide with a wall. As a result of increased standards in safety subsequent to this race, there were no fatalities for a period of 20 years from the deaths of Ratzenberger and Senna, a period which ended with the crash of Jules Bianchi at the 2014 Japanese Grand Prix which led to his death the following year.

== Background ==
Heading into the third round of the season, Benetton driver Michael Schumacher was leading the World Drivers' Championship with 20 points; Jordan driver Rubens Barrichello was second on seven points, 13 points behind Schumacher. Behind Schumacher and Barrichello was Damon Hill in third place on six points, tied on points with Ferrari driver Gerhard Berger. Berger's teammate Jean Alesi was fifth on four points. In the World Constructors' Championship, Benetton were leading on 20 points and Ferrari were second on ten points, with Jordan third on seven points.

There were two driver changes heading into the race. JJ Lehto replaced Jos Verstappen at Benetton, the latter having replaced Lehto for the opening two races of the season due to an injury sustained by Lehto in pre-season testing. Jordan's Eddie Irvine, still serving a three-race suspension, was replaced with Andrea de Cesaris for this race.

== Qualifying ==
=== Friday ===
On Friday, 29 April, during the first practice session, Rubens Barrichello, who was driving for Jordan at the time, hit a kerb at the Variante Bassa corner at 225 km/h (140 mph), launching him into the air. He hit the top of the tyre barrier, and was knocked unconscious by an impact measured at 95 g. Barrichello's car rolled several times after landing before coming to rest upside down. Medical teams treated him at the crash site, and he was taken to the circuit's medical centre before being transferred to Maggiore Hospital in Bologna by helicopter for routine tests and observation to be carried out. Barrichello suffered a sprained wrist and broken nose. Barrichello's tongue blocked his airway during the crash and emergency work done by FIA doctor Sid Watkins saved his life. Barrichello regained consciousness and found Senna looking over him at the medical centre. After learning Barrichello had survived, Senna returned to his car and continued his practice session. Barrichello returned to the race meeting the next day, although his broken nose and a plaster cast on his arm forced him to sit out the rest of the race weekend. Ten years after the incident, Damon Hill, who drove for the Williams-Renault team at the time, described the feeling after the crash: "We all brushed ourselves off and carried on qualifying, reassured that our cars were tough as tanks and we could be shaken but not hurt."

Despite a spin, Senna’s Friday “Practice 1” time was 1:21.598, 1.157 s quicker than Damon Hill, 1.250 s quicker than Michael Schumacher and, 1.469 s quicker than Gerhard Berger.

=== Saturday qualifying and death of Roland Ratzenberger ===
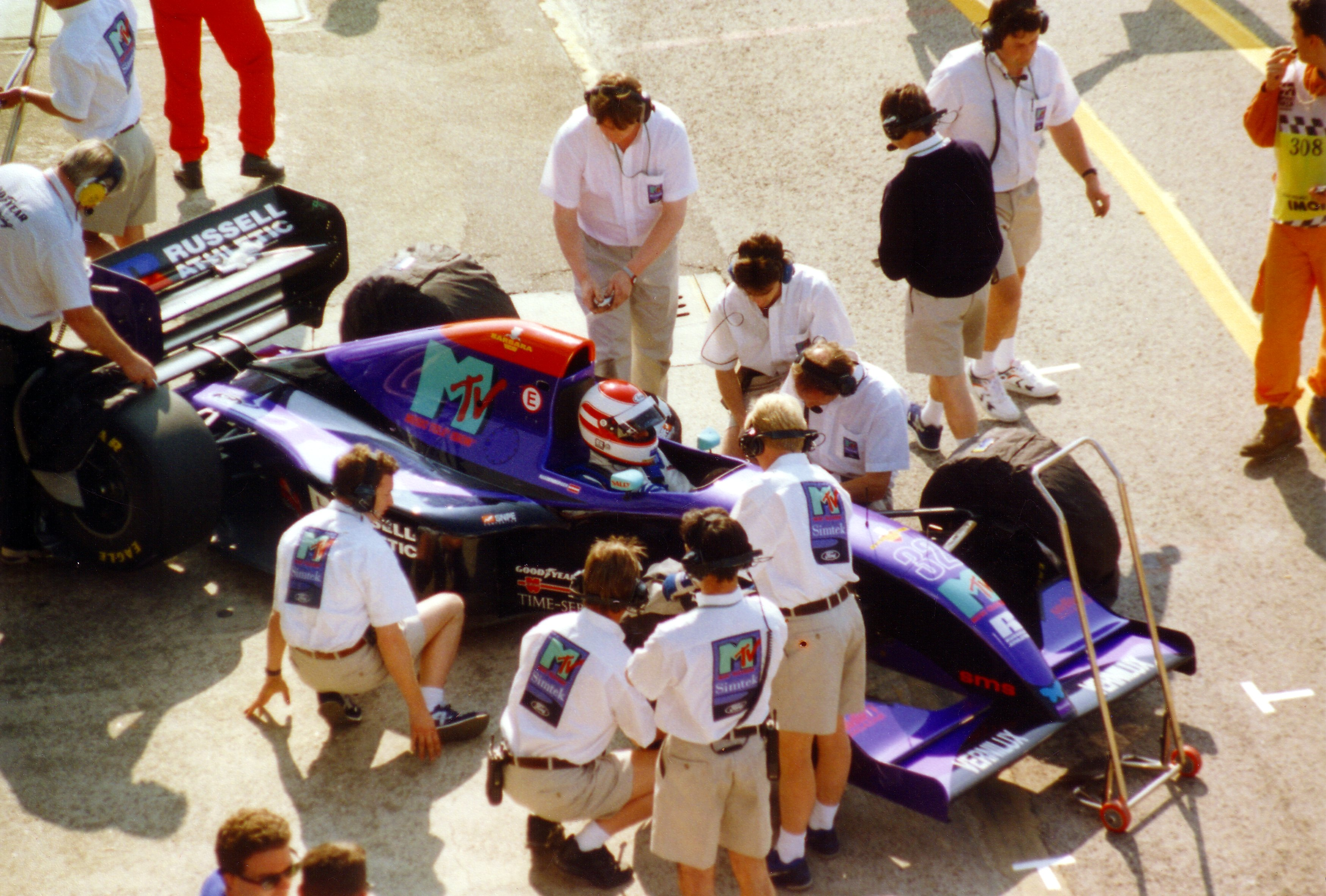
Roland Ratzenberger was fatally injured in qualifying after crashing due to a front-wing failure.

Eighteen minutes into the final qualifying session, Austrian driver Roland Ratzenberger failed to negotiate the Villeneuve curva in his Simtek, hitting the opposing concrete retaining barrier wall almost head-on.

Ratzenberger, in his first season as a Formula One driver, had run over a kerb at the Acque Minerali chicane on his previous lap, the impact of which is believed to have damaged his front wing. Rather than return to the pit lane, he continued on another fast lap. As Ratzenberger's Simtek racer accelerated past 300 km/h for the first time since he had begun the previous lap, the front wing gave way to the air pressure, most likely due to failure of two bolts attaching the wing to the nose's underside, and snapped off. It was pushed under the car, thus lifting the front wheels off the asphalt.

As a result, Ratzenberger could neither steer the car nor brake more than superficially with the rear wheels. Thrown out of control, the car continued straight ahead in the Villeneuve corner at a speed of 314 km/h (195 mph). There were no tyre barriers or any other impact-absorbing installations in place at the Villeneuve curva, and the Simtek hit the bare concrete wall with a resulting force measured to be 500 g, the highest ever registered in F1.

After the crash, the session was immediately stopped via red flag. Doctors were on the spot within a minute, and chief doctor Sid Watkins quickly joined them. After initially being taken by ambulance to the on-circuit medical centre, Ratzenberger was airlifted to the anaesthesia and resuscitation unit of Maggiore Hospital at 14:07 local time, the second driver to be admitted there during the weekend. He was found to have suffered three separate injuries, all fatal, due to the enormity of the impact: a basilar skull fracture, blunt trauma from the front left tyre penetrating the survival cell, and a ruptured aorta. It was determined he had died almost immediately upon impact.

The session was restarted 48 minutes later, but several teams—including Williams and Benetton—took no further part. Ratzenberger was confirmed dead as a result of his multiple injuries at 14:15 local time. His death marked the first Formula One race weekend fatality since the 1982 Canadian Grand Prix when Riccardo Paletti was killed. It had been eight years since Elio de Angelis died testing a Brabham car at the Circuit Paul Ricard. Professor Sid Watkins, then head of the Formula One on-track medical team, recalled in his memoirs Ayrton Senna's reaction to the news, stating that "Ayrton broke down and cried on my shoulder." Watkins tried to persuade Senna not to race the following day, asking "What else do you need to do? You have been world champion three times, you are obviously the quickest driver. Give it up and let's go fishing." Senna replied, "Sid, there are certain things over which we have no control. I cannot quit, I have to go on."

Senna had qualified on pole position based on his lap time in Friday qualifying, having not set a time in the Saturday qualifying session following Ratzenberger's death. He was joined on the front row by Schumacher and Berger qualified in 3rd. Damon Hill was able to improve on his disastrous Friday session before the red flag, improving his time by one second and qualifying fourth as a result. A time posted by Ratzenberger before his fatal crash would have been sufficient for entry into the race starting from the 26th and final position on the grid. With Barrichello injured, Pacific's Paul Belmondo, the only driver to miss the cut, was promoted to the final position as the alternate by rule. However, on the ESPN broadcast in the United States, it was noted Belmondo declined to participate out of respect for Ratzenberger, and on the grounds that he had not earned that race spot and Ratzenberger had.

The Villeneuve kink, location of Ratzenberger's fatal crash.

=== Aftermath ===
Ratzenberger's death had one lasting legacy. On 1 May 1994, during the customary drivers' briefing, the remaining drivers agreed to the reformation of the Grand Prix Drivers' Association, with Senna, Gerhard Berger and Michael Schumacher as its first directors. The association subsequently pressed for improvements to car and circuit safety in the wake of Imola and other serious crashes during the 1994 season; for 2003, the FIA mandated the use of the HANS device, designed to prevent the type of injury suffered by Ratzenberger.

=== Qualifying classification ===
Pos	No	Driver	Constructor	Friday Time	Saturday Time	Gap	Grid
1	2	(Brazil) Ayrton Senna	Williams-Renault	1:21.548	no time		1
2	5	(Germany) Michael Schumacher	Benetton-Ford	1:22.015	1:21.885	+0.337	2
3	28	(Austria) Gerhard Berger	Ferrari	1:22.113	1:22.226	+0.565	3
4	0	(United Kingdom) Damon Hill	Williams-Renault	1:23.199	1:22.168	+0.620	4
5	6	(Finland) JJ Lehto	Benetton-Ford	1:22.717	1:24.029	+1.169	5
6	27	(Italy) Nicola Larini	Ferrari	1:22.841	1:23.006	+1.293	6
7	30	(Germany) Heinz-Harald Frentzen	Sauber-Mercedes	1:23.119	no time	+1.571	7
8	7	(Finland) Mika Häkkinen	McLaren-Peugeot	1:23.611	1:23.140	+1.592	8
9	3	(Japan) Ukyo Katayama	Tyrrell-Yamaha	1:24.000	1:23.322	+1.774	9
10	29	(Austria) Karl Wendlinger	Sauber-Mercedes	1:23.788	1:23.347	+1.799	10
11	10	(Italy) Gianni Morbidelli	Footwork-Ford	1:23.663	1:24.682	+2.115	11
12	4	(United Kingdom) Mark Blundell	Tyrrell-Yamaha	1:23.703	1:23.831	+2.155	12
13	8	(United Kingdom) Martin Brundle	McLaren-Peugeot	1:24.443	1:23.858	+2.310	13
14	23	(Italy) Pierluigi Martini	Minardi-Ford	1:24.078	1:24.423	+2.530	14
15	24	(Italy) Michele Alboreto	Minardi-Ford	1:24.276	1:24.780	+2.728	15
16	9	(Brazil) Christian Fittipaldi	Footwork-Ford	1:24.655	1:24.472	+2.924	16
17	25	(France) Éric Bernard	Ligier-Renault	1:24.678	1:40.411	+3.130	17
18	20	(France) Érik Comas	Larrousse-Ford	1:26.295	1:24.852	+3.304	18
19	26	(France) Olivier Panis	Ligier-Renault	1:24.996	1:25.160	+3.448	19
20	12	(United Kingdom) Johnny Herbert	Lotus-Mugen-Honda	1:25.114	1:25.141	+3.566	20
21	15	(Italy) Andrea de Cesaris	Jordan-Hart	1:25.234	1:25.872	+3.686	21
22	11	(Portugal) Pedro Lamy	Lotus-Mugen-Honda	1:26.453	1:25.295	+3.747	22
23	19	(Monaco) Olivier Beretta	Larrousse-Ford	1:27.179	1:25.991	+4.443	23
24	31	(Australia) David Brabham	Simtek-Ford	1:27.607	1:26.817	+5.269	24
25	34	(France) Bertrand Gachot	Pacific-Ilmor	1:27.732	1:27.143	+5.595	25
26	33	(France) Paul Belmondo	Pacific-Ilmor	1:28.361	1:27.881	+6.333	26^{1}
DNQ	14	(Brazil) Rubens Barrichello	Jordan-Hart	14:57.323	no time	+13:35.775	DNQ
WD	32	(Austria) Roland Ratzenberger	Simtek-Ford	1:27.657	1:27.584	+6.036	DNS^{2}

- ^1 — Paul Belmondo, the first alternate, was permitted to replace Ratzenberger. The entry was withdrawn out of respect to Ratzenberger before the race start.
- ^2 — Roland Ratzenberger suffered a fatal accident during qualifying, and the team withdrew the entry.

== Race ==
=== First start crash ===
The race took place Sunday afternoon from 14:00 CEST (UTC+2), in dry and sunny weather. Michele Alboreto was supposed to start 15th but started from the pit lane in the spare Minardi due to his race car developing a problem. At the start of the race, JJ Lehto stalled his Benetton on the grid. Pedro Lamy, starting from further back on the grid, had his view of the stationary Benetton blocked by other cars and his Lotus hit the back of Lehto's Benetton, causing bodywork and tyres to fly into the air. Parts of the car went over the safety fencing designed to protect spectators at the startline causing minor injuries to a police officer and eight spectators. Gachot narrowly avoided striking Lamy's car. Lamy was uninjured and quickly exited his car unaided. Further back, Martin Brundle overtook two cars as well as Lehto to move from thirteenth to tenth place.

No stoppage of the race was declared as a result of the accident between Lehto and Lamy, but the safety car driven by Max Angelelli was deployed, with all the remaining competitors holding position behind it while travelling at a reduced speed. During this period, as a result of travelling at slower speeds, tyre temperatures dropped. At the drivers' briefing before the race, Senna, along with Gerhard Berger, had expressed concern that the safety car (itself only reintroduced in Formula One in 1993 and only the third time used since then, the other occurrences being the 1993 Brazilian Grand Prix and the 1993 British Grand Prix) did not go fast enough to keep tyre temperatures high. Senna was also worried by a procedure introduced at the 1994 Pacific Grand Prix, whereby the safety car would lead the grid on the formation lap, rather than letting the race leader dictate the pace of the formation lap. The procedure was removed for this race. The safety car chosen for the event, an Opel Vectra, traveled very slowly on the track, even when the reduced speeds of a safety car period were factored in, and Senna pulled alongside it several times, urging the driver to increase his speed. It was later learned the safety car's brakes had been overwhelmed and started fading on the first lap, and thus the driver had to reduce his speed to avoid the possibility of the safety car itself causing an accident. During the safety car drive through, Érik Comas and Éric Bernard made contact such that Comas' car experienced a vibration. Comas made a pit stop to have the problem evaluated by his Larrousse pit crew.

=== Restart, Senna death, and red flag ===
Once the track was reported clear of debris, the safety car was withdrawn and the race restarted at the conclusion of lap five. Jonathan Palmer, commentating alongside Murray Walker for the BBC, remarked how quick Schumacher was, as his time in the warm-up session on Sunday morning gave rise to speculation that he was going to make one pit stop and, therefore, race with a heavier car than Senna, who was planning to make two, as was conventional. Martin Brundle had told BBC Grandstand presenter Steve Rider that McLaren were going to make two pit stops. Senna and Schumacher immediately pulled away from Berger, who in turn, was ahead of Hill after Hill made a poor restart.

On the seventh lap, the second lap at racing speeds after the stoppage, Senna was leading Michael Schumacher. Going at a speed of 305 km/h (190 mph), Senna's car could not take the turn at the Tamburello left corner, and, continuing in a straight line, struck the unprotected concrete barrier at a speed of 211 km/h (131 mph), reduced as a result of the driver's effort to brake. As was subsequently ascertained, Senna was killed instantly. When track officials examined the wreckage of Senna's racing car, they found a furled Austrian flag. Senna had planned to raise it after the race, in honour of Ratzenberger.

At 14:17 local time, a red flag was shown to indicate the race was stopped and FIA race doctor Sid Watkins arrived at the scene to treat Senna. When a race is stopped under a red flag, cars must slow down and make their way back to the pit lane or starting grid unless notified of a restart. This protects race marshals and medical staff at the crash scene, and allows easier access for medical cars to the incident.

Approximately ten minutes after Senna's crash, the Larrousse team, which had been "concentrating on fixing [Comas's] car and didn't realise Senna had crashed", sent Comas to the end of the pit lane for release despite the circuit being closed under red flags. Comas described "a big confusion about whether (he) could rejoin", and that eventually the pit lane marshal allowed him onto the race course. Marshals frantically waved him down as he approached the scene of the accident travelling at close to full speed. Comas was able to stop his Larrousse racer before reaching the emergency vehicles and marshals on the track. Commentators Allard Kalff and Eurosport commentator John Watson were both appalled. Kalff commented: "Now this is ridiculous! I mean, how can that Larrousse get out of the pits when there's a red flag?!", and Watson supplemented: "I'm gobsmacked! I think that's the most ridiculous thing I have ever seen at any time in my life!". After seeing Senna's accident scene, Comas was so distressed that he withdrew from the race, and did not speak of what he witnessed for more than ten years.

The pictures shown on the world feed, supplied by host broadcaster RAI, of Senna being treated were considered by the BBC, the corporation responsible for broadcasting the San Marino Grand Prix live to viewers in the United Kingdom, to be too upsetting for general viewing at the time (around 13:20 BST), and the BBC abandoned RAI's feed to focus on their own camera in the pit lane. Other broadcasters including ESPN and Nine Network took the BBC feed from the pit lane. BBC commentator Murray Walker frequently talked about how upsetting it was to have to talk to viewers whilst avoiding mentioning the images shown on RAI. Referring to the number of times the incident was replayed on the world feed, Ferrari team principal Jean Todt stated that "even if you didn't want to watch it, you could barely fail to".

Waiting on pit lane, Martin Brundle reported that shortly after Senna's crash, televisions in garages were being switched off, but that reports were that Senna was okay. Senna was lifted from the wrecked Williams, and after approximately fifteen minutes of on-site medical attention, was airlifted directly to Maggiore Hospital, becoming the third and final driver to be admitted there during the weekend. Commentating for the Australian telecast, 1980 world champion Alan Jones remarked "that the local hospital [Maggiore Hospital] might think they're a MASH unit because that helicopter has been coming in quite frequently". Medical teams continued to treat him during the flight. Thirty-seven minutes after Senna's fatal crash, at 14:55 local time, the race was restarted.

=== Second start ===
The race was restarted from the beginning of lap 6. The first five laps would be added to the second part of the race and the overall result would be decided on aggregate. The race ran to a total of 58 laps, five from the first section and 53 from the second section.

On the second formation lap, Heinz-Harald Frentzen stalled the engine fitted to his Sauber whilst attempting to leave the grid and was forced to start from the pit lane. The other cars started from the grid in the order they were at the point the race was stopped. Michael Schumacher had a poor start because of wheelspin and Gerhard Berger took the lead on track — Schumacher still led the race overall due to the amount of time he was ahead of Berger before the race was stopped. Hill, from third, made contact attempting to overtake Schumacher at the Tosa corner, dropping Hill to the back of the field and was forced to make a pit stop in order to fit a new nose cone. Hill battled back to finish in sixth position.

Schumacher took the lead on track on lap 12 when Berger ran wide, before relinquishing the race lead overall to Berger when he made his first pit stop, confirming that his pace both before and after the red flag was down to his running a three-stop strategy, therefore racing with a lighter car. Berger made a pit stop at the end of lap 15 for his first of two scheduled stops, before retiring a lap later with handling problems. Mika Häkkinen led his first ever laps of a Formula One World Championship race, before he made a pit stop at the conclusion of lap 18. Following the first series of pit stops, Schumacher resumed the race lead on aggregate, overtaking Nicola Larini on track at Tosa. Schumacher's extra pace as a result of his lighter fuel loads meant he was able to pull out enough of a gap to Häkkinen which enabled him to make an extra pit stop. Häkkinen's pace was very slow, allowing Larini to leapfrog him when drivers who planned to make two pit stops made their final pit stops.

A further three retirements occurred during this stage of the race: Gachot abandoned his car in the gravel at Acque Minerale turn following a reduction of oil pressure on the 25th lap, Brabham retired due to steering failure four laps later and Gianni Morbidelli retired from seventh position when his overheating Ford engine cut out exiting Tosa corner on lap 41. On lap 48, Michele Alboreto came in for a pit stop, but as he left, the rear-right wheel came loose from the Minardi as it left the pit lane, striking two Ferrari and two Lotus mechanics, who were left needing hospital treatment. Although Berger, Bernie Ecclestone and Niki Lauda went to race control to make a request for the event to be stopped, the request was rejected and the race was permitted to continue. Christian Fittipaldi, battling for fifth position with Ukyo Katayama's Tyrrell and Damon Hill's Williams, would eventually retire his Footwork due to a hardening brake pedal that saw him become beached in the gravel on lap 55.

Towards the end of the race, Häkkinen's pace was so slow that Karl Wendlinger was catching him in the Sauber, aiming to give Sauber their first podium finish. However, Häkkinen was able to resist Wendlinger's challenge and finish in third place, with Wendlinger fourth, which proved to be Wendlinger's final points-scoring finish in his career. Ukyo Katayama finished fifth for Tyrrell and Hill was able to battle back to finish sixth, the last of the points-scorers. Michael Schumacher won the race ahead of Larini and Häkkinen, giving him a maximum 30 points after 3 rounds of the 1994 Formula One season. It was the only podium finish of Larini's career, and the first of just two occasions when he scored world championship points. Wendlinger rode back to the pits on Häkkinen's McLaren after Wendlinger's car broke down on the slowing-down lap. At the podium ceremony, out of respect for Roland Ratzenberger, who had died the day before, no champagne was sprayed.

=== Race classification ===
Pos	No	Driver	Constructor	Laps	Time/Retired	Grid	Points
1	5	(Germany) Michael Schumacher	Benetton-Ford	58	1:28:28.642	2	10
2	27	(Italy) Nicola Larini	Ferrari	58	+ 54.942	6	6
3	7	(Finland) Mika Häkkinen	McLaren-Peugeot	58	+ 1:10.679	8	4
4	29	(Austria) Karl Wendlinger	Sauber-Mercedes	58	+ 1:13.658	10	3
5	3	(Japan) Ukyo Katayama	Tyrrell-Yamaha	57	+ 1 lap	9	2
6	0	(United Kingdom) Damon Hill	Williams-Renault	57	+ 1 lap	4	1
7	30	(Germany) Heinz-Harald Frentzen	Sauber-Mercedes	57	+ 1 lap	7	
8	8	(United Kingdom) Martin Brundle	McLaren-Peugeot	57	+ 1 lap	13	
9	4	(United Kingdom) Mark Blundell	Tyrrell-Yamaha	56	+ 2 laps	12	
10	12	(United Kingdom) Johnny Herbert	Lotus-Mugen-Honda	56	+ 2 laps	20	
11	26	(France) Olivier Panis	Ligier-Renault	56	+ 2 laps	19	
12	25	(France) Éric Bernard	Ligier-Renault	55	+ 3 laps	17	
13	9	(Brazil) Christian Fittipaldi	Footwork-Ford	54	Brakes/Spun off	16	
Ret	15	(Italy) Andrea de Cesaris	Jordan-Hart	49	Spun off	21	
Ret	24	(Italy) Michele Alboreto	Minardi-Ford	44	Wheel	15	
Ret	10	(Italy) Gianni Morbidelli	Footwork-Ford	40	Engine	11	
Ret	23	(Italy) Pierluigi Martini	Minardi-Ford	37	Spun off	14	
Ret	31	(Australia) David Brabham	Simtek-Ford	27	Spun off	24	
Ret	34	(France) Bertrand Gachot	Pacific-Ilmor	23	Engine	25	
Ret	19	(Monaco) Olivier Beretta	Larrousse-Ford	17	Engine	23	
Ret	28	(Austria) Gerhard Berger	Ferrari	16	Suspension	3	
Ret	2	(Brazil) Ayrton Senna	Williams-Renault	5	Fatal accident	1	
Ret	20	(France) Érik Comas	Larrousse-Ford	5	Withdrew due to Senna’s crash	18	
Ret	6	(Finland) JJ Lehto	Benetton-Ford	0	Collision	5	
Ret	11	(Portugal) Pedro Lamy	Lotus-Mugen-Honda	0	Collision	22	

== Post-race ==
In the press conference following the race, Schumacher said "I can't feel satisfied, I can't feel happy" with his win following the events that had occurred during the race weekend. Two hours and twenty minutes after Schumacher crossed the finish line, at 18:40 local time, Dr. Maria Teresa Fiandri announced that Senna had died. The official time of death was given as 14:17 local time, meaning that he had been killed instantly. The autopsy recorded the cause of death as head injuries likely caused by an impact from a wheel and suspension. BBC Television commentator Murray Walker described it as "the blackest day for Grand Prix racing that I can remember".

On 3 May, the FIA called a meeting at the request of the Italian Automobile Club to review the events of the weekend. Later on, the governing body announced new safety measures for the next round in Monaco which included the entry and exit of the pit lane to be controlled by a curve to force cars to run at a reduced speed, no team mechanic would be allowed onto the pit lane surface except for pit stops and a draw would be arranged to determine the order in which cars make pit stops and be limited to emergencies with cars not taking on new tyres or allowed to refuel.

Senna was given a state funeral in São Paulo, Brazil on 5 May 1994. Approximately 500,000 people lined the streets to watch the coffin pass. Senna's arch-rival Alain Prost was among the pallbearers. The majority of the Formula One community attended Senna's funeral; however the president of the sport's governing body, the FIA, Max Mosley attended the funeral of Ratzenberger instead which took place on 7 May 1994 in Salzburg, Austria. Drivers Gerhard Berger and Johnny Herbert were present as well. Mosley said in a press conference ten years later, "I went to (Ratzenberger's) funeral because everyone went to Senna's. I thought it was important that somebody went to his."

The layout of the circuit was changed after the two fatal accidents at the 1994 event.

The 1994 Imola layout, which had been in place since 1981, was never again used for a Formula One race. The circuit was heavily modified following the race, including a change at Tamburello—also the scene of major accidents for Gerhard Berger (1989) and Nelson Piquet (1987)—from a high speed corner to a much slower chicane. The FIA also changed the regulations governing Formula One car design, to the extent that the 1995 regulations required all teams to create completely new designs, as their 1994 cars could not be adapted to them. The concern raised at the drivers briefing the morning of the race, by Senna and Berger, would lead to the Grand Prix Drivers' Association reforming at the following race, the 1994 Monaco Grand Prix. The GPDA, which was founded in 1961, had previously disbanded in 1982. The primary purpose of it reforming was to allow drivers to discuss safety issues with a view to improve standards following the incidents at Imola. The front two grid slots at the Monaco Grand Prix that year, which were painted with Brazilian and Austrian flags, were left clear in memory of the two drivers who had lost their lives, while both Williams and Simtek entered only one car each. Additionally, a minute of silence was observed before the race.

Severe injuries to F1 drivers in May 1994 did not end with the San Marino Grand Prix. Two weeks after Imola, Karl Wendlinger suffered a shunt in practice at Monaco that left him comatose for several weeks with brain injuries and ended his 1994 season. Pedro Lamy suffered season ending broken bone injuries in a crash during a testing session at Silverstone on 24 May. On 28 May, during the second qualifying session for the Spanish Grand Prix, Ratzenberger's replacement Andrea Montermini crashed heavily and broke his ankles.

In October 1996 the FIA set about researching a driver restraint system for head-on impacts, in conjunction with McLaren and Mercedes-Benz. Mercedes contacted HANS Performance Products, owned by sportscar racer Jim Downing and his brother-in-law, Michigan State University College of Engineering professor Robert Hubbard, with a view to adapting their device for Formula One. Developed by the family pair after the death Renault's United States motorsport sporting director in a Renault R5 during the 1981 IMSA GT Championship Mid-Ohio Sports Car Course test, Downing debuted the first prototype at the season-ending IMSA Daytona 3 Hours in 1986. Amateur sportscar racer Paul Newman was Downing's first customer in 1988. It was designed to restrain the head and neck in the event of an accident to avoid basal skull fracture, the injury which killed Ratzenberger. Initial tests proved successful, and at the 2000 San Marino Grand Prix the final report was released which concluded that the HANS should be recommended for use. Following a series of incidents in various motorsport series in the late 1990s where CART mandated its use on ovals (but not road courses, leading to the death of Gonchi Rodríguez in 1999), then a rash of NASCAR fatal crashes in 2000 and 2001 (most notably the death of Dale Earnhardt) led to their mandated usage in October 2001, the FIA made a head and neck restraint compulsory from the start of the 2003 season. Downing and Hubbard were inducted to the Motorsports Hall of Fame of America in 2024 for their work in driver restraint systems.

Senna was the last driver for twenty years to die in a Formula One accident, until the death of Jules Bianchi in 2015 from injuries sustained at the 2014 Japanese Grand Prix. However, three trackside marshals were killed during those years as a direct result of such crashes: Paolo Gislimberti at the 2000 Italian Grand Prix, Graham Beveridge at the 2001 Australian Grand Prix and Mark Robinson at the 2013 Canadian Grand Prix. In the years that followed this tragic weekend it has since been revealed safety car driver Max Angelelli expressed concern of the suitability of the Opel Vectra safety car to then-FIA technical delegate Charlie Whiting particularly the lack of power, the poor general car handling and the suitability of the cars' brakes for that track. Angelelli further stated that his blood "ran cold' when he first saw it and that he had initially been given permission to switch to a significantly more powerful and better handling Porsche 911 which had been used for Porsche Supercup support race but this initial permission was rescinded on Saturday morning forcing Angelleli to use the underpowered Opel instead.

=== Launch control controversy ===
Liverpool Data Research Associates (LDRA) were called in to investigate allegations of cheating using banned driving aids, such as traction control and launch control, both of which had been prohibited at the start of the year. The top three cars of Schumacher, Larini and Häkkinen were investigated and their teams were asked to surrender their systems' source code to the company. Larini's team, Ferrari, complied in light of allegations that they were cheating, but Schumacher and Häkkinen's teams, Benetton and McLaren refused, claiming copyright reasons. After being fined $100,000 by the FIA, both teams complied eight days after the race. LDRA discovered that McLaren were running a program that permitted automatic gearshifts but the car was declared legal.

Benetton sent an alternative suggestion to the company on 10 May 1994, which was accepted by LDRA five days later. Tests on the Benetton car were to be carried out on 28 June 1994, but were cancelled. The tests eventually took place on 6 July 1994. LDRA found the tests unsatisfactory. Benetton therefore complied with the original request to supply the source code, on 18 July 1994. Analysis of the software found that it included launch control. Benetton stated that "it can only be switched on by recompilation of the code." However, LDRA found this to be untrue; it could be switched on by connecting a computer to the gearbox control unit. Benetton conceded that this was possible but claimed that it "came as a surprise to them". To switch the system on, the user was presented with a menu with 10 visible options. "Launch Control" was not among them, but if the user scrolled down to option 13, it could be enabled. However, LDRA concluded that the software likely was not used during the Grand Prix, leading the FIA to take no action against Benetton.

== Trial ==
Italian prosecutors brought legal proceedings against six people in connection with Senna's death. They were Frank Williams, Patrick Head and Adrian Newey of Williams; Fedrico Bendinelli representing the owners of the Autodromo Enzo e Dino Ferrari; Giorgio Poggi as the circuit director and Roland Bruynseraede who was race director and sanctioned the circuit. The trial verdict was given on 16 December 1997, clearing all six defendants of manslaughter charges. The cause of Senna's accident was established by the court as the steering column breaking. The column had been cut and welded back together at Senna's request in order for him to be more comfortable in the car.

Following the court's decision, an appeal was lodged by the state prosecutor against Patrick Head and Adrian Newey. On 22 November 1999, the appeal absolved Head and Newey of all charges, stating that no new evidence had come to light (there was missing data from the black box recorder on Senna's car due to damage, and 1.6 seconds of video from the onboard camera of Senna's car was unavailable because the broadcaster switched to another car's camera just before the accident), and so under Article 530 of the Italian Penal Code, the accusation had to be declared as "non-existent or the fact doesn't subsist". This appeal result was annulled in January 2003, as the Court of Cassation believed that Article 530 was misinterpreted, and a retrial was ordered. On 27 May 2005, Newey was acquitted of all charges while Head's case was "timed out" under a statute of limitations. The Italian Court of Appeal, on 13 April 2007, stated the following in the verdict numbered 15050: "It has been determined that the accident was caused by a steering column failure. This failure was caused by badly designed and badly executed modifications. The responsibility of this falls on Patrick Head, culpable of omitted control". Even being found responsible for Senna's accident, Patrick Head was not arrested, as the verdict was delivered past the Italian statute of limitation for manslaughter.

== Championship standings after the race ==
Drivers' Championship standings

Pos	Driver	Points
1	(Germany) Michael Schumacher	30
2	(United Kingdom) Damon Hill	7
3	(Brazil) Rubens Barrichello	7
4	(Austria) Gerhard Berger	6
5	(Italy) Nicola Larini	6

Constructors' Championship standings

Pos	Constructor	Points
1	(United Kingdom) Benetton-Ford	30
2	(Italy) Ferrari	16
3	(United Kingdom) Williams-Renault	7
4	(Republic of Ireland) Jordan-Hart	7
5	(Switzerland) Sauber-Mercedes	6

== See also ==
- Senna (film)

Previous race: 1994 Pacific Grand Prix	FIA Formula One World Championship; 1994 season	Next race: 1994 Monaco Grand Prix
Previous race: 1993 San Marino Grand Prix	San Marino Grand Prix	Next race: 1995 San Marino Grand Prix
