= Frank Coppuck =

British engineer and racing car designer

Frank Coppuck is a British engineer and racing car designer.

A nephew of Formula One engineer Gordon Coppuck. After graduating from Kingston Polytechnic with a Bachelor of Science in mechanical and aeronautical engineering he went to work for the Royal Aircraft Establishment at Farnborough. In 1979 he moved to British Aerospace at Weybridge, working on aircraft wing design and composites engineering.

His motor racing career did not start until 1985 when he was hired to join the FORCE Lola team at Colnbrook. When that team closed down in 1986 he moved to Tyrrell Racing, as a composites and race engineer. After a brief spell with the March Alfa Romeo Indycar program he moved to Team Lotus following the departure of chief designer Mike Coughlan. This coincided with the takeover of the team by Peter Collins and Peter Wright, and Coppuck was involved in the design of the team's aborted Lotus 103 car, and in revamping the Lotus 102 design.

At the end of 1991 he moved to the United States where he worked in CART with Dick Simon Racing. Later that year he returned to Britain and became technical director of TOM'S GB, working with John Barnard on the design of a secret Formula One car. When Toyota decided not to enter, Coppuck joined Pacific Grand Prix as chief designer for the Pacific PR02. After Pacific closed its doors at the end of the 1995 season Coppuck moved to Benetton but stayed only a year before going back to TOM'S GB. He then moved on to McLaren where he was in charge of the McLaren GT program.
