= Pacific Racing =

British automotive racing team

(United Kingdom) Pacific
- Full name: Pacific Team Lotus (1995); Pacific Grand Prix (1994)
- Base: Thetford, United Kingdom
- Founder(s): Keith Wiggins
- Noted staff: Adrian Reynard; Frank Coppuck
- Noted drivers: (France) Paul Belmondo (France) Bertrand Gachot (Italy) Giovanni Lavaggi (Switzerland) Jean-Denis Délétraz (Italy) Andrea Montermini

Formula One World Championship career
- First entry: 1994 Brazilian Grand Prix
- Races entered: 33 (40 starts from 66 entries)
- Constructors' Championships: 0
- Drivers' Championships: 0
- Race victories: 0 (best finish: 8th, 1995 German and Australian Grands Prix)
- Pole positions: 0 (best grid position: 19th, 1995 Japanese Grand Prix)
- Fastest laps: 0
- Final entry: 1995 Australian Grand Prix

Pacific Racing (later known as Pacific Grand Prix, and finally as Pacific Team Lotus) was a motor racing team from the United Kingdom. Following success in lower formulae, the team took part in two full seasons of Formula One, in 1994 and 1995, entering 33 Grands Prix without any success.

== Origins and success in lower formulae ==
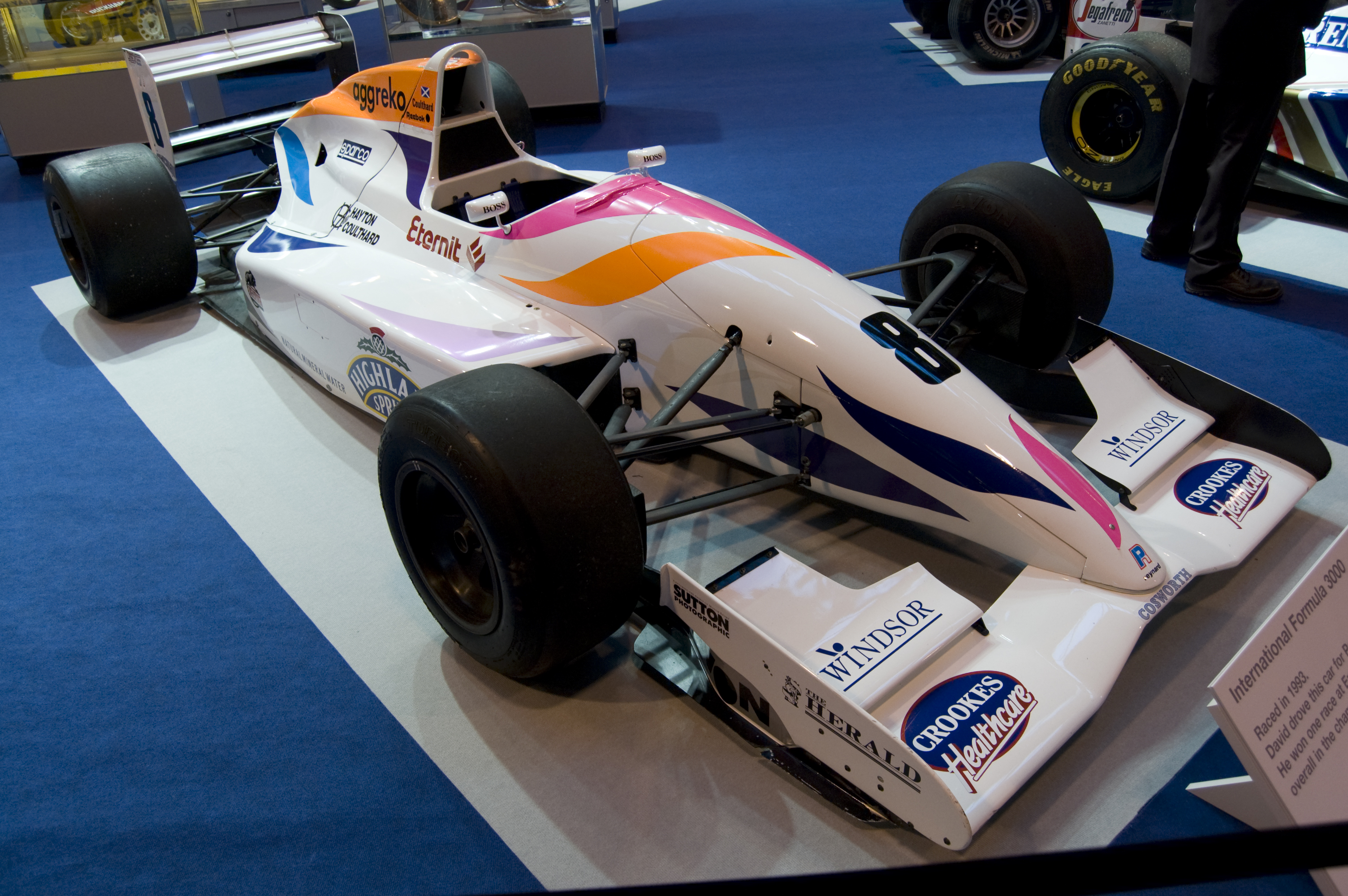
David Coulthard's Pacific Racing Formula 3000 Reynard from 1993.

The team was founded by former mechanic Keith Wiggins in 1984, to race in the European Formula Ford Championship, with Norwegian driver Harald Huysman and Marlboro backing. Huysman won both the European and Benelux titles. On Huysman's advice, Pacific entered Bertrand Gachot in British Formula Ford with a Reynard in 1985. The following year, Gachot, also part of the Marlboro World Championship team, won the Formula Ford 2000 crown for Pacific. Marlboro stayed with Wiggins' team in FF2000 in 1987, winning the British title with JJ Lehto.

In 1988, Pacific entered the British F3 Championship with Lehto and a Reynard car, and won the title on their first attempt. Wiggins did not want to stay in F3 and moved up to Formula 3000, once more in association with Reynard and Marlboro. However, Lehto and Eddie Irvine's season was disappointing and the tobacco company's support moved to rival DAMS in 1990. The team returned to form in 1991, taking Christian Fittipaldi to the F3000 crown.

== Formula One ==
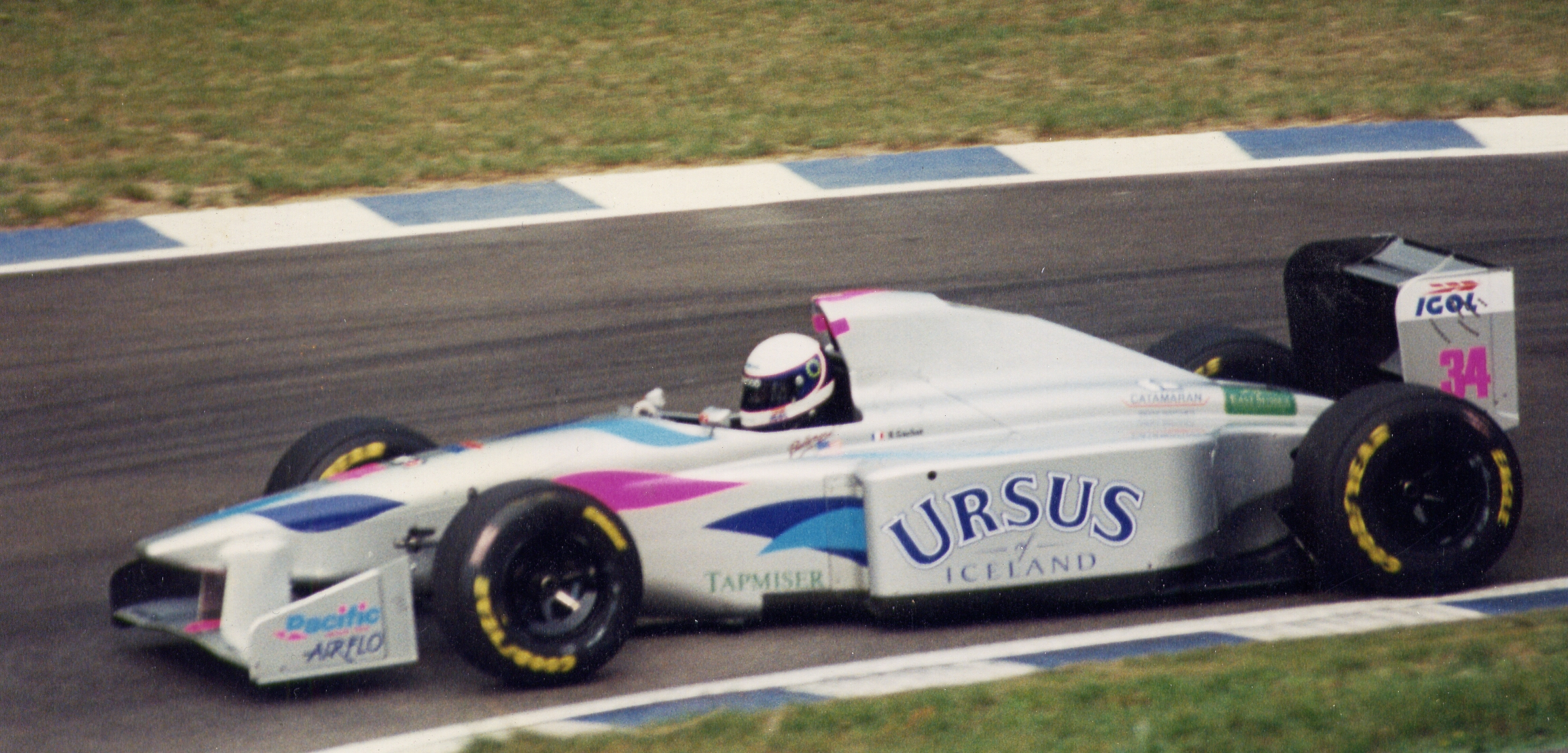
Bertrand Gachot during the latter half of 1994.

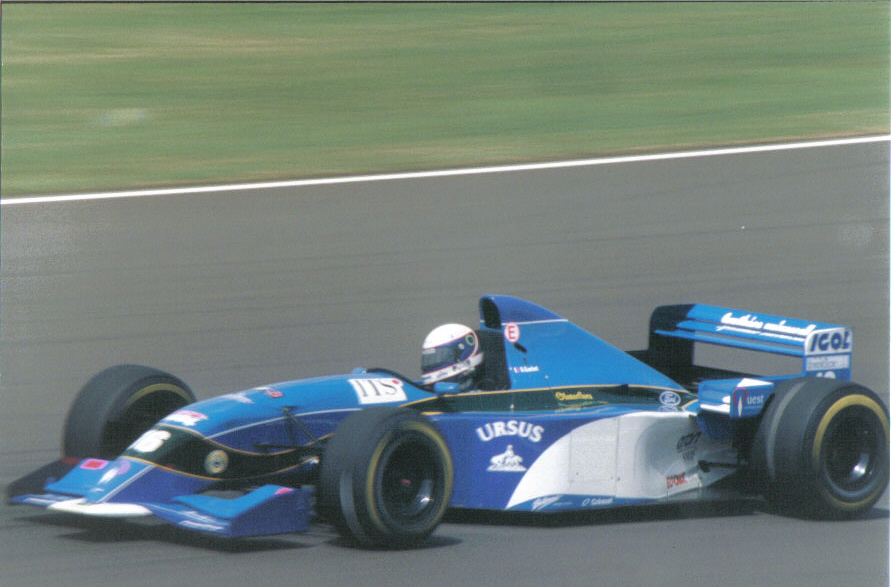
Gachot driving for Pacific at the 1995 British Grand Prix.

Pacific Racing had won in every junior category it had participated in, and by 1992 Wiggins was determined that it would make the step up to F1 for the 1993 season, in the process renaming the team as Pacific Grand Prix. Lacking an in-house engineering staff and conscious of how limited his timescale was, Wiggins contacted F3000 constructor Reynard Racing to design and build the new PR01 chassis, hoping to benefit from several years of research and development that Reynard had invested in their recently scrapped in-house F1 project. Unfortunately for Pacific, the Rory Byrne-led design team had gone to Benetton at the end of 1991 and Reynard had sold the design (still in form of paper drawings) to Ligier. The small PR01 design team, working at Reynard but nominally employed by Pacific to conform to FIA Regulations, were forced to start a new design based on what little of the Reynard F1 research remained and utilizing a number of minor components from Reynard's F3000 chassis in an attempt to constrain costs. With their roots in the same project, the resulting Benetton B193, Ligier JS37 and Pacific PR01 shared the same slab-sided, raised-nose profile that later became standard in Formula One.

They instead postponed their entry in January 1993 because of a recession and resulting failure of investors to pay up.

They were unable to enter F1 until 1994. The year was a disaster. Paul Belmondo and former Jordan driver Bertrand Gachot (who was a shareholder in the team) started the season as drivers, with Oliver Gavin testing. The PR01, designed for the 1993 season, had undergone none of the vital wind tunnel testing required to refine the car's aerodynamics, had seen only a few dozen miles of track testing and its Ilmor 3.5 L V10 engine was underpowered by 1994 standards. That season the team failed to score a point or finish a single race, and from the French Grand Prix onwards, neither car qualified.

Aiming for a fresh start in 1995, Pacific made a deal with the owner of the former Team Lotus to enter as "Pacific Team Lotus". Although no staff, equipment or technology came to the team as a result, the aim was for Pacific to benefit from association with the famous Lotus name. The obsolete Ilmor engines had been replaced by Ford ED V8s and a whole host of new sponsors were brought in. Good news also came when the PR02 was guaranteed a start each race, with Larrousse and Lotus disappearing from the entry lists and only Forti coming in. An embarrassing moment happened during the reveal of the car when it took Wiggins 25 minutes to open a bottle of champagne. Belmondo had been replaced with Andrea Montermini. Having had no luck in the first half of the season, team partner Gachot vacated his seat in mid-1995, making way for paydrivers Giovanni Lavaggi (four races, four DNFs) and Jean-Denis Délétraz (two races, one DNF, one NC). Gachot later returned after the money of the two pay-drivers dried up and two drivers Wiggins wanted to run (Formula Nippon driver Katsumi Yamamoto for Okayama and Suzuka and test driver Oliver Gavin for Australia) were denied superlicences. Pacific's best finishes that season were 8th in the German and Australian Grands Prix, both times as the multi-lapped last car in the track.

== Withdrawal and aftermath ==
At the end of the 1995 season, the team withdrew from Formula One and Wiggins went back to Formula 3000, resurrecting Pacific Racing with Patrick Lemarié and Cristiano da Matta as drivers, but was unable to recapture the success of the pre-F1 era. Both were replaced by Oliver Tichy and Marc Gené for the following season; Gené left the team after his accident at Pau, and Tichy continued alone until the team quit mid-season. In 1997, Pacific's former F1 drivers Gachot and Belmondo were reunited in the All Japan Grand Touring Car Championship, both acting as drivers of the Pacific-sponsored Toyota Supra entered by Cerumo in the GT500 class. On that same year, Wiggins also attempted to enter sportscar racing and the 24 Hours of Le Mans with a heavily modified BRM chassis known as the P301 and using Nissan engines. Following a series of failures for the project into 1998, Wiggins closed the team.

Wiggins joined Lola and helped the constructor reclaim ground in the Champ Car World Series. With a foothold in the United States, the mechanic-turned-team manager joined up with the Herdez brewery and in 2000 acquired Bettenhausen Motorsports, renaming it HVM Racing. In 2006, Paul Stoddart, former owner of the Minardi F1 team, bought an interest in the team and renamed it Minardi Team USA; the team reverted to the HVM Racing name after American open-wheel reunification two years later, before leaving the sport at the end of 2012 season.

== Racing record ==
=== Results summary ===
Year	Championship	Car	#	Driver(s)	Races	Wins	Poles	Fastest laps	Points	DC/WDC	TC/WCC
1984	Benelux Formula Ford 1600			(Norway) Harald Huysman						1st	
1984	European Formula Ford 1600			(Norway) Harald Huysman						1st	
1985	British Formula Ford 1600	Reynard		(Belgium) Bertrand Gachot							
1986	British Formula Ford 2000	Reynard		(Belgium) Bertrand Gachot						1st	
1987	British Formula Ford 2000			(Finland) JJ Lehto						1st	
1987	European Formula Ford			(Finland) JJ Lehto						1st	
1988	British Formula Three	Reynard 883-Toyota	8	(Finland) JJ Lehto	18	8	6	11	113	1st	n/a
1988	British Formula Three	Reynard 883-Toyota	10	(United States) Evan Demoulas	8	0	0	0	0	NC	n/a
1988	British Formula Three	Reynard 883-Toyota	10	(United Kingdom) John Alcorn					21*	7th	n/a
1988	Macau Grand Prix	Reynard 883-Toyota	2	(Finland) JJ Lehto	1	0	0	0	n/a	Ret	n/a
1989	International Formula 3000	Reynard 89D-Mugen	24	(United Kingdom) Eddie Irvine	10	0	0	0	11	9th	7th
1989	International Formula 3000	Reynard 89D-Mugen	25	(Finland) JJ Lehto	9	0	0	0	6	13th	7th
1989	International Formula 3000	Reynard 89D-Mugen	25	(United Kingdom) Allan McNish	1	0	0	0	0	NC	7th
1990	International Formula 3000	Lola T90/50-Mugen	24	(Canada) Stéphane Proulx	11	0	0	1	0	NC	NC
1990	International Formula 3000	Lola T90/50-Mugen	25	(Brazil) Marco Greco	2	0	0	0	0	NC	NC
1990	International Formula 3000	Lola T90/50-Mugen	25	(Canada) Claude Bourbonnais	2	0	0	0	0	NC	NC
1991	International Formula 3000	Reynard 91D-Mugen	29	(Italy) Antonio Tamburini	10	1	0	1	22	4th	1st
1991	International Formula 3000	Reynard 91D-Mugen	30	(Brazil) Christian Fittipaldi	10	2	4	1	47	1st	1st
1992	International Formula 3000	Reynard 92D-Mugen	1	(France) Laurent Aïello	10	0	0	0	3	13th	4th
1992	International Formula 3000	Reynard 92D-Mugen	2	(Spain) Jordi Gené	10	1	1	0	21	5th	4th
1993	International Formula 3000	Reynard 93D-Cosworth	8	(United Kingdom) David Coulthard	9	1	0	2	25	3rd	4th
1993	International Formula 3000	Reynard 93D-Cosworth	9	(Germany) Michael Bartels	7	0	0	0	4	=11th	4th
1993	International Formula 3000	Reynard 93D-Cosworth	9	(United Kingdom) Phil Andrews	2	0	0	0	0	NC	4th
1994	Formula One	Pacific PR01-Ilmor	33	(France) Paul Belmondo	16	0	0	0	0	NC	NC
1994	Formula One	Pacific PR01-Ilmor	34	(France) Bertrand Gachot	16	0	0	0	0	NC	NC
1995	Formula One	Pacific PR02-Ford	16	(France) Bertrand Gachot	11	0	0	0	0	NC	NC
1995	Formula One	Pacific PR02-Ford	16	(Italy) Giovanni Lavaggi	4	0	0	0	0	NC	NC
1995	Formula One	Pacific PR02-Ford	16	(Switzerland) Jean-Denis Délétraz	2	0	0	0	0	NC	NC
1995	Formula One	Pacific PR02-Ford	17	(Italy) Andrea Montermini	17	0	0	0	0	NC	NC
1996	International Formula 3000	Lola T96/50-Zytek	28	(France) Patrick Lemarié	10	0	0	0	2	=13th	7th
1996	International Formula 3000	Lola T96/50-Zytek	29	(Brazil) Cristiano da Matta	10	0	0	0	7	=8th	7th
1997	International Formula 3000	Lola T96/50-Zytek	14	(Austria) Oliver Tichy	8	0	0	0	14*	7th	9th
1997	International Formula 3000	Lola T96/50-Zytek	15	(Spain) Marc Gené	2	0	0	1	0	NC	9th
1997	Intl. Sports Racing Series	BRM P301-Nissan	14	(Austria) Franz Konrad (United Kingdom) Richard Dean (Germany) Wido Rössler	1	0	0	0	0	NC	NC
1997	24 Hours of Le Mans	BRM P301-Nissan	14	(Chile) Eliseo Salazar (Finland) Harri Toivonen (Spain) Jesús Pareja	1	0	0	0	n/a	n/a	n/a
1998	Intl. Sports Racing Series	BRM P301-Nissan	14	(United Kingdom) Tim Sugden (South Africa) Grant Orbell (United Kingdom) William Hewland	2	0	0	0	0	NC	NC

* Including points scored for other teams.

=== Complete International Formula 3000 results ===
(key)

Year	Chassis	Engine	Tyres	Drivers	1	2	3	4	5	6	7	8	9	10	11	Points	TC
1989	Reynard 89D	Mugen V8	A		SIL	VAL	PAU	JER	PER	BRH	BIR	SPA	BUG	DIJ		17	7th
1989	Reynard 89D	Mugen V8	A	(United Kingdom) Eddie Irvine	DNS	Ret	DSQ	Ret	3	Ret	6	9	4	4		17	7th
1989	Reynard 89D	Mugen V8	A	(Finland) JJ Lehto	DSQ	Ret	4	6	Ret	Ret	Ret	5	Ret			17	7th
1989	Reynard 89D	Mugen V8	A	(United Kingdom) Allan McNish										8		17	7th
1990	Lola T90/50	Mugen V8	A		DON	SIL	PAU	JER	MNZ	PER	HOC	BRH	BIR	BUG	NOG	0	NC
1990	Lola T90/50	Mugen V8	A	(Canada) Stéphane Proulx	12	Ret	Ret	Ret	Ret	Ret	10	Ret	Ret	Ret	7	0	NC
1990	Lola T90/50	Mugen V8	A	(Brazil) Marco Greco	DNQ	DNQ										0	NC
1990	Lola T90/50	Mugen V8	A	(Canada) Claude Bourbonnais										DNQ	DNQ	0	NC
1991	Reynard 91D	Mugen V8	A		VAL	PAU	JER	MUG	PER	HOC	BRH	SPA	BUG	NOG		69	1st
1991	Reynard 91D	Mugen V8	A	(Italy) Antonio Tamburini	3	10	4	7	4	6	5	Ret	1	Ret		69	1st
1991	Reynard 91D	Mugen V8	A	(Brazil) Christian Fittipaldi	2	2	1	3	DSQ	4	3	Ret	2	1		69	1st
1992	Reynard 92D	Mugen V8	A		SIL	PAU	CAT	PER	HOC	NUR	SPA	ALB	NOG	MAG		24	4th
1992	Reynard 92D	Mugen V8	A	(France) Laurent Aïello	Ret	Ret	Ret	11	10	5	6	Ret	7	Ret		24	4th
1992	Reynard 92D	Mugen V8	A	(Spain) Jordi Gené	1	Ret	3	Ret	5	8	2	Ret	8	10		24	4th
1993	Reynard 93D	Cosworth V8	A		DON	SIL	PAU	PER	HOC	NUR	SPA	MAG	NOG			29	4th
1993	Reynard 93D	Cosworth V8	A	(United Kingdom) David Coulthard	13	2	2	1	Ret	7	3	Ret	Ret			29	4th
1993	Reynard 93D	Cosworth V8	A	(Germany) Michael Bartels	Ret	3	Ret	Ret	Ret	Ret	Ret					29	4th
1993	Reynard 93D	Cosworth V8	A	(United Kingdom) Phil Andrews								DSQ	13			29	4th
1996	Lola T96/50	Zytek V8	A		NUR	PAU	PER	HOC	SIL	SPA	MAG	EST	MUG	HOC		9	7th
1996	Lola T96/50	Zytek V8	A	(France) Patrick Lemarié	12	5	13	10	8	Ret	8	15	Ret	8		9	7th
1996	Lola T96/50	Zytek V8	A	(Brazil) Cristiano da Matta	9	4	5	Ret	Ret	10	5	7	20	Ret		9	7th
1997	Lola T96/50	Zytek V8	A		SIL	PAU	HEL	NUR	PER	HOC	A1R	SPA	MUG	JER		8	9th
1997	Lola T96/50	Zytek V8	A	(Austria) Oliver Tichy	8	8	2	9	Ret	7	5	Ret				8	9th
1997	Lola T96/50	Zytek V8	A	(Spain) Marc Gené	13	DNQ										8	9th

=== Complete Formula One results ===
(key)

Year	Chassis	Engine	Tyres	Drivers	1	2	3	4	5	6	7	8	9	10	11	12	13	14	15	16	17	Points	WCC
1994	PR01	Ilmor 2175A 3.5 V10	G		BRA	PAC	SMR	MON	ESP	CAN	FRA	GBR	GER	HUN	BEL	ITA	POR	EUR	JPN	AUS		0	NC
1994	PR01	Ilmor 2175A 3.5 V10	G	(France) Paul Belmondo	DNQ	DNQ	DNQ	Ret	Ret	DNQ	DNQ	DNQ	DNQ	DNQ	DNQ	DNQ	DNQ	DNQ	DNQ	DNQ		0	NC
1994	PR01	Ilmor 2175A 3.5 V10	G	(France) Bertrand Gachot	Ret	DNQ	Ret	Ret	Ret	Ret	DNQ	DNQ	DNQ	DNQ	DNQ	DNQ	DNQ	DNQ	DNQ	DNQ		0	NC
1995	PR02	Ford EDC 3.0 V8	G		BRA	ARG	SMR	ESP	MON	CAN	FRA	GBR	GER	HUN	BEL	ITA	POR	EUR	PAC	JPN	AUS	0	NC
1995	PR02	Ford EDC 3.0 V8	G	(France) Bertrand Gachot	Ret	Ret	Ret	Ret	Ret	Ret	Ret	12							Ret	Ret	8	0	NC
1995	PR02	Ford EDC 3.0 V8	G	(Italy) Giovanni Lavaggi									Ret	Ret	Ret	Ret						0	NC
1995	PR02	Ford EDC 3.0 V8	G	(Switzerland) Jean-Denis Délétraz													Ret	15				0	NC
1995	PR02	Ford EDC 3.0 V8	G	(Italy) Andrea Montermini	9	Ret	Ret	DNS	DSQ	Ret	NC	Ret	8	12	Ret	DNS	Ret	Ret	Ret	Ret	Ret	0	NC
