= Simtek S941 =

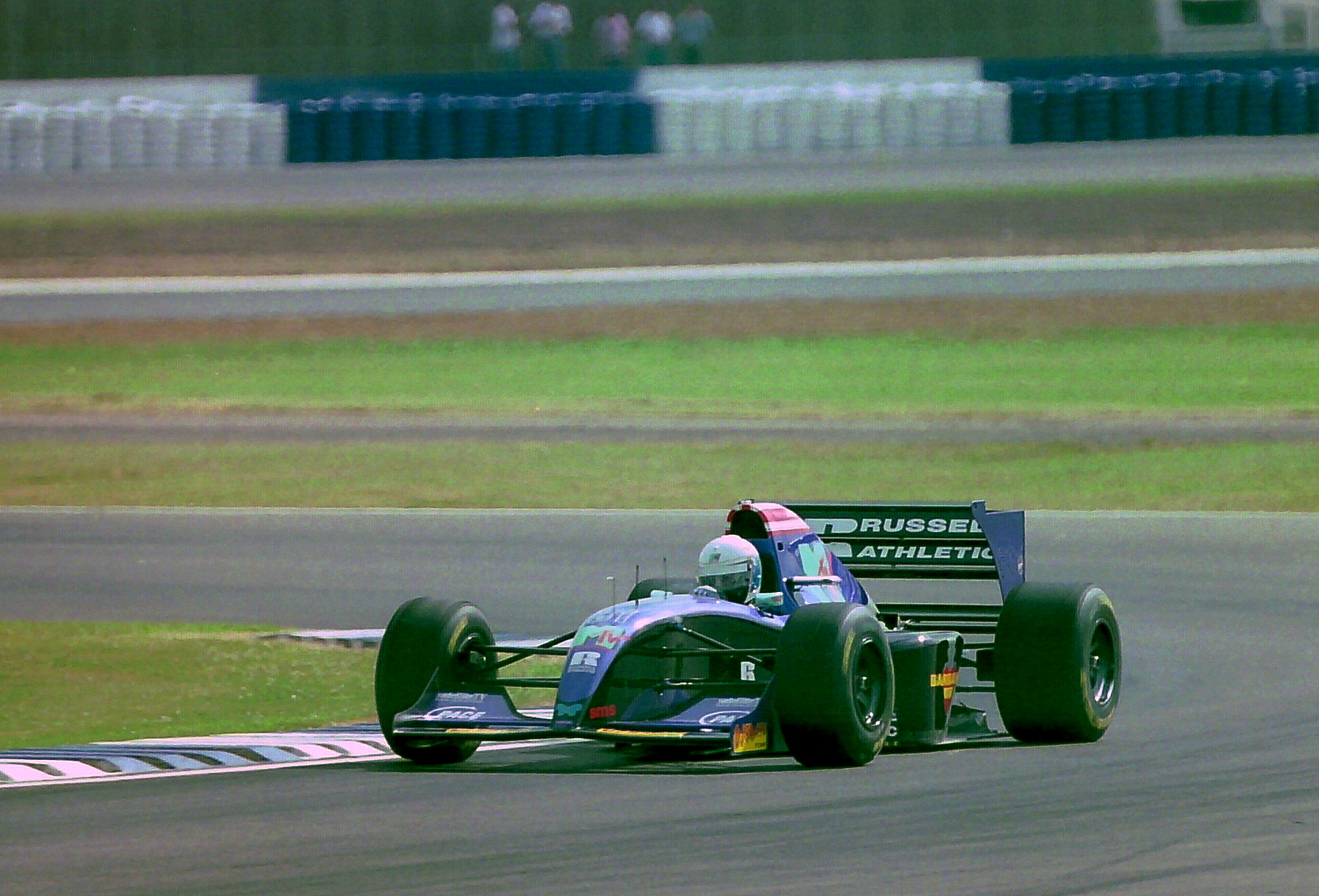
- David Brabham driving the S941 at the 1994 British Grand Prix
- Category: Formula One
- Constructor: Simtek
- Designers: Nick Wirth (Technical Director); Paul Crooks (Chief Designer)
- Successor: S951

Technical specifications
- Engine: Ford HBD6, 3497cc, 75-degree V8, naturally aspirated,
- Transmission: Simtek Xtrac T, 6-speed, "Semi-shift"
- Power: 700 hp @ 13,000 rpm
- Fuel: Elf
- Tyres: Goodyear

Competition history
- Notable entrants: MTV Simtek Ford
- Notable drivers: 31. (Australia) David Brabham; 32. (Austria) Roland Ratzenberger; 32. (France) Jean-Marc Gounon; 32. (Italy) Domenico Schiattarella; 32. (Japan) Taki Inoue; 32 + TD. (Italy) Andrea Montermini
- Debut: 1994 Brazilian Grand Prix, Autódromo José Carlos Pace.
Races	Wins	Podiums	Poles	F/Laps
16	0	0	0	0
- Constructors' Championships: 0
- Drivers' Championships: 0

The Simtek S941 is a Formula One car, designed by Nick Wirth and Paul Crooks for the Simtek team, and used during 1994 Formula One season. Although it was the first car to race under the Simtek name the company had previously designed an unbuilt car for BMW - the unbuilt design formed the basis of the Andrea Moda S921. Simtek also produced a design for Jean Mosnier's abortive Bravo S931 project which was to have launched in 1993. There is a strong family resemblance between the 1992 Andrea Moda and the 1994 Simtek.

== Overview ==
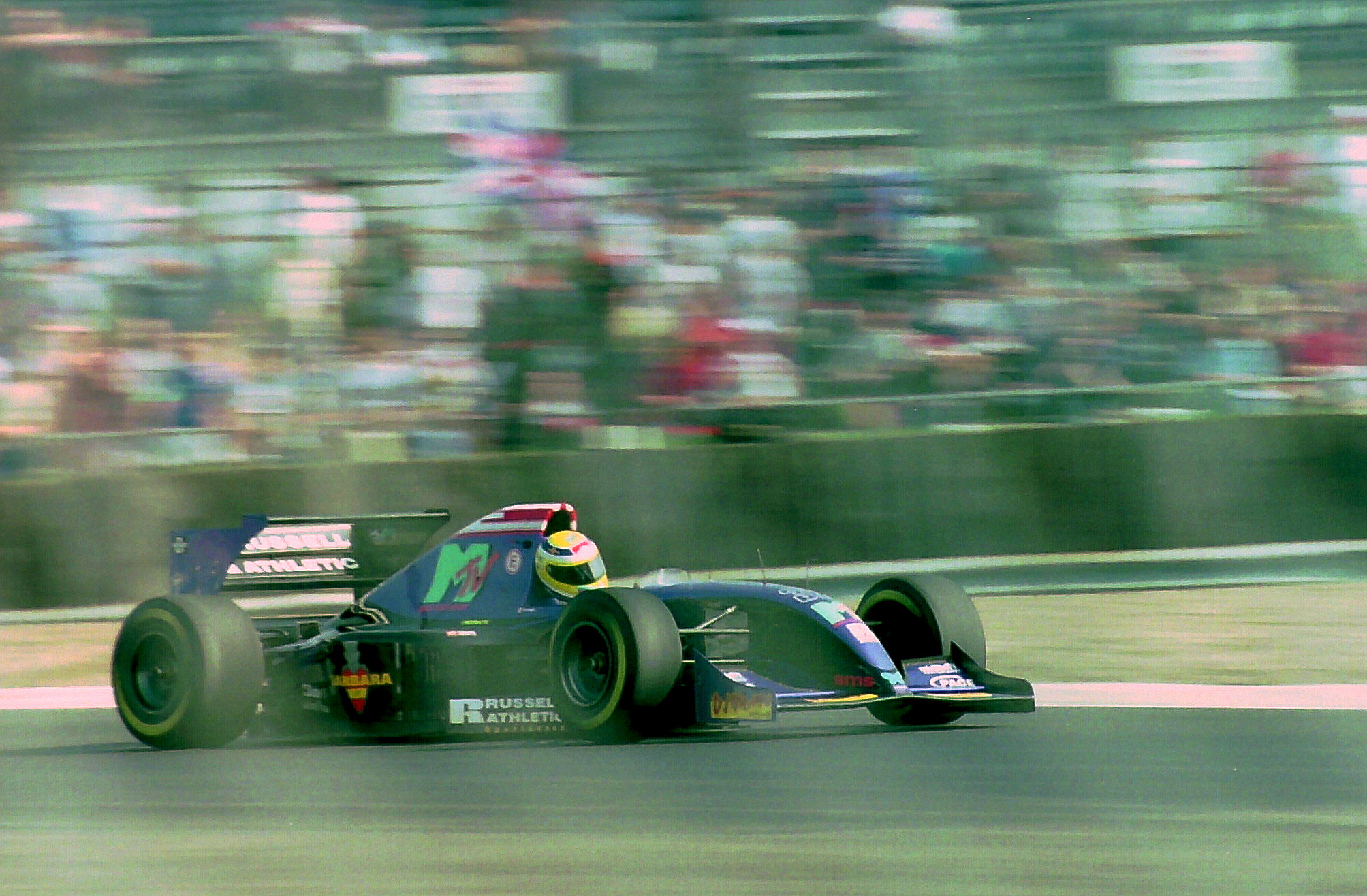
Jean-Marc Gounon driving the S941 at the 1994 British Grand Prix

=== Name ===
The car was named S941, S refers to the team's name, 94, the year that competed and 1 for Formula One.

=== Engine ===
The car was powered by a naturally aspirated Ford HBD 6 V8. It was underpowered, but only suffered three failures all season, all in David Brabham's car.

=== Drivers ===
The S941 was driven by David Brabham for the whole season. Roland Ratzenberger was scheduled to drive the second car for the first five races, as he only had funding for the first part of the season, but his death at Imola the day before 3-time World Champion Ayrton Senna meant other drivers had to step in. Andrea Montermini was involved in a very serious accident at his very first race with the team in the Spanish Grand Prix practice session. This left the team in serious financial difficulties. For the remaining part of the year, three other drivers were in the second seat, including Jean-Marc Gounon, Domenico Schiattarella and Japanese pay driver Taki Inoue.

== 1994 season ==
The team got the Simtek S941 home 12 times from 32 starts. They benefited from the slowness of the Simtek's back-of-the-grid rival Pacific PR01, which rarely qualified. The Simtek S941 did not score any points in its debut season; Jean-Marc Gounon marked the team's highest finish with ninth at the French Grand Prix, although he was four laps down on the leader.

== Livery ==
The main sponsor was MTV. Other notable sponsors including Barbara (an investor in the team) and Russell Athletics. After the San Marino, the team decided to continue racing with the top of the airbox bearing the Austrian flag with the words "For Roland" in tribute to Ratzenberger. During 1994 Japanese Grand Prix, Simtek received a new sponsorship from South Korean airline giants Korean Air and thus marked for the first time South Korea sponsorship involved in the sport as well as boosting Formula One's popularity in the country.

== Race results ==
(key) (results in bold indicate pole position)

Year	Team	Engine	Tyres	Drivers	1	2	3	4	5	6	7	8	9	10	11	12	13	14	15	16	Points	WCC
1994	MTV Simtek Ford	Ford HB V8	G		BRA	PAC	SMR	MON	ESP	CAN	FRA	GBR	GER	HUN	BEL	ITA	POR	EUR	JPN	AUS	0	-
1994	MTV Simtek Ford	Ford HB V8	G	David Brabham	12	Ret	Ret	Ret	10	14	Ret	15	Ret	11	Ret	Ret	Ret	Ret	12	Ret	0	-
1994	MTV Simtek Ford	Ford HB V8	G	Roland Ratzenberger	DNQ	11	DNS														0	-
1994	MTV Simtek Ford	Ford HB V8	G	Andrea Montermini					DNQ												0	-
1994	MTV Simtek Ford	Ford HB V8	G	Jean-Marc Gounon							9	16	Ret	Ret	11	Ret	15				0	-
1994	MTV Simtek Ford	Ford HB V8	G	Domenico Schiattarella														19		Ret	0	-
1994	MTV Simtek Ford	Ford HB V8	G	Taki Inoue															Ret		0	-
