= 1994 Pacific Grand Prix =

Japanese Formula One race held in 1994

- Race 2 of 16 in the 1994 Formula One World Championship
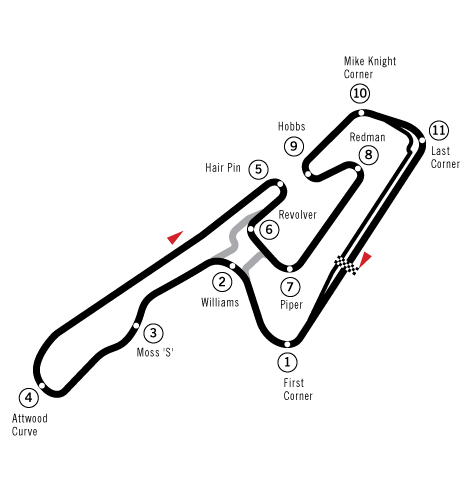

Race details
- Date: 17 April 1994
- Official name: I Pacific Grand Prix
- Location: TI Circuit; Aida, Japan
- Course: Permanent racing facility
- Course length: 3.703 km (2.314 miles)
- Distance: 83 laps, 307.349 km (192.093 miles)
- Weather: Sunny

Pole position
Driver	(Brazil) Ayrton Senna	Williams-Renault
- Time: 1:10.218

Fastest lap
Driver	(Germany) Michael Schumacher	Benetton-Ford
- Time: 1:14.023 on lap 10

Podium
First	(Germany) Michael Schumacher	Benetton-Ford
Second	(Austria) Gerhard Berger	Ferrari
Third	(Brazil) Rubens Barrichello	Jordan-Hart

The 1994 Pacific Grand Prix (formally the I Pacific Grand Prix) was a Formula One motor race held on 17 April 1994 at the TI Circuit, Aida, Japan. It was the second race of the 1994 Formula One World Championship.

The 83-lap race was won by German driver Michael Schumacher, driving a Benetton-Ford, after he started from second position. Brazilian Ayrton Senna took pole position in his Williams-Renault but retired following a first-corner collision with the Ferrari of Italian Nicola Larini, leaving Schumacher to lead all 83 laps. Austrian Gerhard Berger was second in the other Ferrari with another Brazilian, Rubens Barrichello, third in a Jordan-Hart, his and the Jordan team's first podium finish.

== Background ==
The Pacific Grand Prix was the first of two races scheduled to be held in Japan in 1994 with the Japanese Grand Prix due to take place at Suzuka in October. The race at the new to the calendar TI Circuit acted as a replacement for the European Grand Prix at Donington Park that had been originally scheduled for this date but was later cancelled, though the European Grand Prix would later reappear on the calendar with the event taking place in early October at the Circuito de Jerez in Spain as a replacement for the Argentine Grand Prix. Ferrari driver Jean Alesi injured his back in a testing accident at Mugello, while Jordan driver Eddie Irvine unsuccessfully appealed against the one-race ban handed to him for his involvement in the four-car accident in Brazil, this ban being increased to three races. Nicola Larini would substitute for Alesi at the Pacific race, while Aguri Suzuki would take Irvine's place.

== Qualifying report ==
Most drivers set their best qualifying times during Friday's session, the track conditions on Saturday being slower. Ayrton Senna took pole position in his Williams by 0.22 seconds from Michael Schumacher in the Benetton. Damon Hill was third in the other Williams with Mika Häkkinen fourth in the McLaren, followed by Gerhard Berger in the Ferrari and Martin Brundle in the other McLaren. The top ten was completed by Larini in the other Ferrari, Rubens Barrichello in the Jordan, Christian Fittipaldi in the Footwork and Jos Verstappen in the other Benetton. Suzuki was 20th in the other Jordan, while the two Simteks of David Brabham and Roland Ratzenberger were 25th and 26th respectively, condemning the two Pacifics of Bertrand Gachot and Paul Belmondo to non-qualification.

=== Qualifying classification ===
Pos	No	Driver	Constructor	Q1	Q2	Gap
1	2	(Brazil) Ayrton Senna	Williams-Renault	1:10.218	1:19.304	
2	5	(Germany) Michael Schumacher	Benetton-Ford	1:10.440	no time	+0.222
3	0	(United Kingdom) Damon Hill	Williams-Renault	1:10.771	1:12.048	+0.553
4	7	(Finland) Mika Häkkinen	McLaren-Peugeot	1:11.683	no time	+1.465
5	28	(Austria) Gerhard Berger	Ferrari	1:11.744	1:12.184	+1.526
6	8	(United Kingdom) Martin Brundle	McLaren-Peugeot	1:12.351	no time	+2.133
7	27	(Italy) Nicola Larini	Ferrari	1:12.372	5:32.428	+2.154
8	14	(Brazil) Rubens Barrichello	Jordan-Hart	1:12.409	1:13.172	+2.191
9	9	(Brazil) Christian Fittipaldi	Footwork-Ford	1:13.169	1:12.444	+2.226
10	6	(Netherlands) Jos Verstappen	Benetton-Ford	1:12.554	1:12.681	+2.336
11	30	(Germany) Heinz-Harald Frentzen	Sauber-Mercedes	1:12.686	1:12.797	+2.468
12	4	(United Kingdom) Mark Blundell	Tyrrell-Yamaha	1:13.013	1:12.751	+2.533
13	10	(Italy) Gianni Morbidelli	Footwork-Ford	1:12.866	1:13.090	+2.648
14	3	(Japan) Ukyo Katayama	Tyrrell-Yamaha	1:13.013	1:13.411	+2.795
15	24	(Italy) Michele Alboreto	Minardi-Ford	1:13.342	1:13.016	+2.798
16	20	(France) Érik Comas	Larrousse-Ford	1:13.111	1:13.550	+2.893
17	23	(Italy) Pierluigi Martini	Minardi-Ford	1:13.529	1:13.756	+3.311
18	25	(France) Éric Bernard	Ligier-Renault	1:13.613	1:14.204	+3.395
19	29	(Austria) Karl Wendlinger	Sauber-Mercedes	1:13.855	1:14.163	+3.637
20	15	(Japan) Aguri Suzuki	Jordan-Hart	1:14.036	1:13.932	+3.714
21	19	(Monaco) Olivier Beretta	Larrousse-Ford	1:14.101	1:14.271	+3.883
22	26	(France) Olivier Panis	Ligier-Renault	1:14.106	1:14.667	+3.888
23	12	(United Kingdom) Johnny Herbert	Lotus-Mugen-Honda	1:14.538	1:14.424	+4.206
24	11	(Portugal) Pedro Lamy	Lotus-Mugen-Honda	1:14.657	1:15.146	+4.439
25	31	(Australia) David Brabham	Simtek-Ford	1:14.946	1:14.748	+4.530
26	32	(Austria) Roland Ratzenberger	Simtek-Ford	no time	1:16.536	+6.318
DNQ	34	(France) Bertrand Gachot	Pacific-Ilmor	1:16.927	1:18.571	+6.709
DNQ	33	(France) Paul Belmondo	Pacific-Ilmor	1:18.671	1:17.450	+7.232

== Race report ==
Ayrton Senna was overtaken by Schumacher before the first corner and was then hit from behind by Mika Häkkinen and spun off the track. Nicola Larini also went off the track and crashed into Senna, causing race-ending damage to both cars. Mark Blundell also spun on the same corner after a collision at the apex of the first corner, stalling his car in the middle of the track. On lap 3 Damon Hill spun off trying to overtake Hakkinen, but rejoined and climbed back to second place before stopping with transmission failure on lap 49. As Jos Verstappen in the second Benetton retired after he spun off just as soon as he came out of the pits on lap 55 as he was 3 laps behind teammate Schumacher. Martin Brundle meanwhile was looking secure in 3rd place after Barrichello pitted before he retired shortly after with his engine overheating on lap 68. Alboreto and Wendlinger to whom were just behind the top 6 had collided and both went off into the gravel trap forcing both drivers to retire whilst the Minardi was trying to get past the Sauber at the time. Michael Schumacher won comfortably from Gerhard Berger and Rubens Barrichello. Roland Ratzenberger's 11th place would be the Austrian's only finish before his death during qualifying for the following Grand Prix at Imola.

=== Illegal driver aids ===
During the weekend, Ferrari test driver Nicola Larini (who had replaced the injured Jean Alesi for the early part of the season), leaked to the Italian media that he had used traction control (one of the banned for 1994 electronic driver aids) during the practice session for the race. Ferrari and Larini later denied the claims to the worldwide press. The "leak" by Larini further raised suspicions about teams using illegal aids to help them in races. Further, after the first corner collision that put him out of the race, instead of going back to the Williams pit area, Ayrton Senna opted to sit on the wall on the outside of the turn and watch the cars for a number of laps to see if he could hear any noises that suggested traction control was being used illegally in the other cars. Senna returned to the Williams pit area after about 10 laps had been completed, suspicious that the Benetton B194 was illegal.

=== Race classification ===
Pos	No	Driver	Constructor	Laps	Time/Retired	Grid	Points
1	5	(Germany) Michael Schumacher	Benetton-Ford	83	1:46:01.693	2	10
2	28	(Austria) Gerhard Berger	Ferrari	83	+ 1:15.300	5	6
3	14	(Brazil) Rubens Barrichello	Jordan-Hart	82	+ 1 lap	8	4
4	9	(Brazil) Christian Fittipaldi	Footwork-Ford	82	+ 1 lap	9	3
5	30	(Germany) Heinz-Harald Frentzen	Sauber-Mercedes	82	+ 1 lap	11	2
6	20	(France) Érik Comas	Larrousse-Ford	80	+ 3 laps	16	1
7	12	(United Kingdom) Johnny Herbert	Lotus-Mugen-Honda	80	+ 3 laps	23	
8	11	(Portugal) Pedro Lamy	Lotus-Mugen-Honda	79	+ 4 laps	24	
9	26	(France) Olivier Panis	Ligier-Renault	78	+ 5 laps	22	
10	25	(France) Éric Bernard	Ligier-Renault	78	+ 5 laps	18	
11	32	(Austria) Roland Ratzenberger	Simtek-Ford	78	+ 5 laps	26	
Ret	10	(Italy) Gianni Morbidelli	Footwork-Ford	69	Engine/Spun off	13	
Ret	29	(Austria) Karl Wendlinger	Sauber-Mercedes	69	Collision damage	19	
Ret	24	(Italy) Michele Alboreto	Minardi-Ford	69	Collision	15	
Ret	8	(United Kingdom) Martin Brundle	McLaren-Peugeot	67	Overheating	6	
Ret	23	(Italy) Pierluigi Martini	Minardi-Ford	63	Spun off	17	
Ret	6	(Netherlands) Jos Verstappen	Benetton-Ford	54	Spun off	10	
Ret	0	(United Kingdom) Damon Hill	Williams-Renault	49	Transmission	3	
Ret	15	(Japan) Aguri Suzuki	Jordan-Hart	44	Steering	20	
Ret	3	(Japan) Ukyo Katayama	Tyrrell-Yamaha	42	Engine	14	
Ret	7	(Finland) Mika Häkkinen	McLaren-Peugeot	19	Gearbox	4	
Ret	19	(Monaco) Olivier Beretta	Larrousse-Ford	14	Electrical	21	
Ret	31	(Australia) David Brabham	Simtek-Ford	2	Electrical	25	
Ret	2	(Brazil) Ayrton Senna	Williams-Renault	0	Collision	1	
Ret	27	(Italy) Nicola Larini	Ferrari	0	Collision	7	
Ret	4	(United Kingdom) Mark Blundell	Tyrrell-Yamaha	0	Collision	12	

== Championship standings after the race ==
Drivers' Championship standings

Pos	Driver	Points
1	(Germany) Michael Schumacher	20
2	(Brazil) Rubens Barrichello	7
3	(United Kingdom) Damon Hill	6
4	(Austria) Gerhard Berger	6
5	(France) Jean Alesi	4

Constructors' Championship standings

Pos	Constructor	Points
1	(United Kingdom) Benetton-Ford	20
2	(Italy) Ferrari	10
3	(Republic of Ireland) Jordan-Hart	7
4	(United Kingdom) Williams-Renault	6
5	(United Kingdom) Footwork-Ford	3

Previous race: 1994 Brazilian Grand Prix	FIA Formula One World Championship; 1994 season	Next race: 1994 San Marino Grand Prix
Previous race: 1963 Pacific Grand Prix	Pacific Grand Prix	Next race: 1995 Pacific Grand Prix
Awards
Preceded by 1993 European Grand Prix	Formula One Promotional Trophy for Race Promoter; 1994	Succeeded by 1995 Australian Grand Prix
