= Paul Crooks =

- Born: 8 December 1955 (age 70)
- Citizenship: British
- Occupation: Engineer

Paul Crooks (born 8 December 1955) is a British former Formula One engineer.

== Career ==
Crooks began his career as an apprentice aeronautical engineer when he was 17 at the Royal Aircraft Establishment based in Farnborough. He spent five years there before joining RAE at the age of 22. For the next five years he worked as a detail designer on aerospace projects, working alongside Frank Coppuck. From there, he got a job with Toleman Group Motorsport (later Benetton Formula, then Renault F1) as a detail designer. He worked under Rory Byrne for the next six years, before moving up to chief composite design engineer in 1983.

In 1993, Crooks became Ligier's chief designer under Frank Dernie, but with the arrest of team boss Cyril de Rouvre, which sent the team into decline, Crooks joined Simtek. While with Simtek, he designed both the S941 and S951. He stayed with them until the team left Formula One in the middle of 1995. He went back to Ligier, before joining Jordan. He later went to BAR and Minardi.

Crooks later worked for Wirth Research, who designed the Acura ARX-01a, ARX-01b and ARX-02a.
