= 1994 Spanish Grand Prix =

- Race 5 of 16 in the 1994 Formula One World Championship
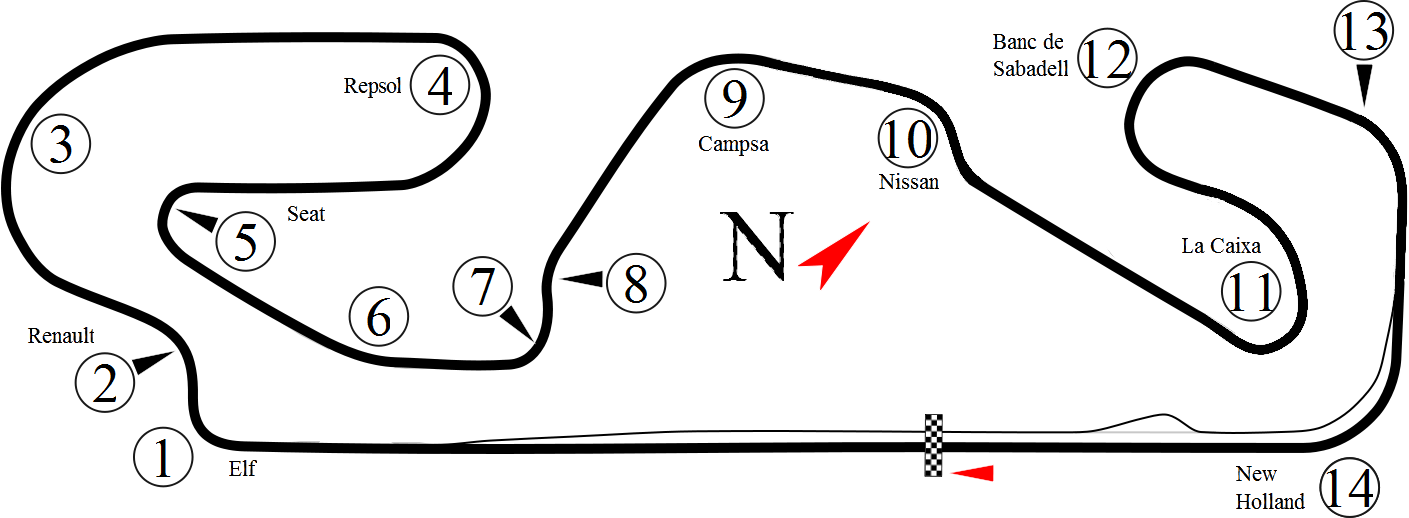

Race details
- Date: 29 May 1994
- Official name: XXXVI Gran Premio Marlboro de España
- Location: Circuit de Catalunya, Montmeló, Catalonia, Spain
- Course: Permanent racing facility
- Course length: 4.745 km (2.948 miles)
- Distance: 65 laps, 308.284 km (191.559 miles)
- Weather: Sunny
- Attendance: 40,000

Pole position
Driver	(Germany) Michael Schumacher	Benetton-Ford
- Time: 1:21.908

Fastest lap
Driver	(Germany) Michael Schumacher	Benetton-Ford
- Time: 1:25.155 on lap 18

Podium
First	(United Kingdom) Damon Hill	Williams-Renault
Second	(Germany) Michael Schumacher	Benetton-Ford
Third	(United Kingdom) Mark Blundell	Tyrrell-Yamaha

The 1994 Spanish Grand Prix was a Formula One motor race held on 29 May 1994 at the Circuit de Catalunya, Montmeló. It was the 36th Spanish Grand Prix and the fourth to be held at the Circuit de Catalunya, and the fifth race of the 1994 Formula One World Championship.

The 65-lap race was won by Englishman Damon Hill, driving a Williams-Renault. It was the first victory of the season for Hill and the Williams team, who were still recovering from the death of Ayrton Senna at Imola four weeks previously. Hill won by 24 seconds from German driver and championship leader Michael Schumacher, whose Benetton-Ford was stuck in fifth gear for most of the race. Another Englishman, Mark Blundell, finished third in a Tyrrell-Yamaha, which would turn out to be the final podium finish for him and the Tyrrell team.

The Grand Prix was additionally notable for the season-ending crash of debutant Italian driver Andrea Montermini in his Simtek S941 on the front straight. Montermini, elevated from test driver status after the death of Roland Ratzenberger at the San Marino Grand Prix crashed heavily into the outside wall exiting the final corner. It also marked the Formula One debut of future race winner David Coulthard, replacing Senna for Williams. The new Lotus 109 made its debut this weekend replacing the two-year-old 107.

== Report ==
=== Pre-race ===
This was the first race for the newly formed Grand Prix Drivers Association (GPDA). Several top level names, including Michael Schumacher, Damon Hill, and Gerhard Berger, were instrumental in the setup and running of the GPDA, and they took the decision to install a temporary chicane before the Nissan corner. This was an attempt to improve safety, as well as limit speeds around the track, as the Nissan corner was generally taken at near flat-out speeds.

Sauber entered only one car for this race due to Karl Wendlinger's injury at the previous race.

=== Qualifying ===
Michael Schumacher took the second pole position in succession and the second of his career. Damon Hill also lined up on the front row, his time had been beaten by Schumacher's by over half a second, and he was only one thousandth of a second ahead of Mika Häkkinen. The pair's respective Williams and McLaren teammates lined up eighth and ninth, McLaren's Martin Brundle on the fourth row in front of a disappointed David Coulthard for Williams. JJ Lehto, Schumacher's Benetton teammate had done a bit better for himself and lined up fourth. Rubens Barrichello's Jordan qualified in fifth, followed by the two Ferraris. Tyrrell driver Ukyo Katayama was the other driver in the top ten, while at the back Andrea Montermini crashed heavily in the Simtek previously driven by Roland Ratzenberger and broke his left heel and his right foot. He thus did not set a timed lap in the second session, and failed to qualify, although he would have been unable to start the race anyway.

=== Race ===
Olivier Beretta retired when his Larousse-Ford's engine failed on the formation lap. Schumacher led from pole position at the start of the race whilst Barrichello and Berger touched at the first corner. Neither driver retired as a direct result of the collision, although both did retire eventually. Later in the race Berger ran across the grass and lost places and would retire on lap 28 with gearbox problems. Coulthard climbed up to fifth place from his ninth place starting spot, but his car stalled in the pits on lap 16. Despite retiring from twelfth place on lap 32 with electrical problems, he described his race as a "good debut overall". Michael Schumacher led comfortably for first 22 laps, but became stuck in fifth gear after his first pit stop which led to overtakes by Mika Häkkinen and Damon Hill. Rubens Barrichello retired after he went off the track on lap 40. After the pit stops, Mika Häkkinen was in third place for McLaren behind Hill and Schumacher, having temporarily been in front of Schumacher earlier in the race. Häkkinen's engine failed on lap 49, as did JJ Lehto's Benetton-Ford 5 laps later, granting the place to Hakkinen's teammate Martin Brundle. Brundle then retired himself after a transmission explosion from the back of his car at the first corner on lap 60 and was classified 11th. While Williams notched up their first victory of the season with Damon Hill, and first after the death of Ayrton Senna, championship leader Michael Schumacher finished a strong second, despite being stuck in fifth gear for most of the race. Knowing that he had a major problem, he managed to make a pitstop (and get away from the pit stop in 5th gear), and as the race unfolded gave nothing to the leading Hill's pace. He had to change his driving style to find new trajectories and corner apexes, and his past experience as a World Sports Car driver helped him to do so. Mark Blundell, for Tyrrell, completed the podium celebrations, scoring his 3rd and last podium of his career as well as Tyrrell's last Formula 1 podium. Jean Alesi, Pierluigi Martini and Eddie Irvine scored the remaining points. In a high attrition race only ten drivers took checkered flag and Martin Brundle was classified 11th as he completed more than 90% of the race distance.

=== Post-race ===
After the race, the Williams team were very emotional with Hill's win.

I don't think I have known such a difficult month. Everyone at Williams has been through a terrible time. This victory must go to them and to all the fans of Ayrton Senna who I met in Brazil. They wanted Williams to be successful. It was important to do well in this race and to win it is better than I expected to do.

— Damon Hill speaking about Senna, Transcript of recording from Grand Prix Racing.

== Classification ==
=== Qualifying ===
Pos	No	Driver	Constructor	Q1 Time	Q2 Time	Gap
1	5	(Germany) Michael Schumacher	Benetton-Ford	1:23.426	1:21.908	
2	0	(United Kingdom) Damon Hill	Williams-Renault	1:24.716	1:22.559	+0.651
3	7	(Finland) Mika Häkkinen	McLaren-Peugeot	1:24.580	1:22.660	+0.752
4	6	(Finland) JJ Lehto	Benetton-Ford	1:25.587	1:22.983	+1.075
5	14	(Brazil) Rubens Barrichello	Jordan-Hart	1:25.990	1:23.594	+1.686
6	27	(France) Jean Alesi	Ferrari	1:24.997	1:23.700	+1.792
7	28	(Austria) Gerhard Berger	Ferrari	1:26.121	1:23.715	+1.807
8	8	(United Kingdom) Martin Brundle	McLaren-Peugeot	1:26.614	1:23.763	+1.855
9	2	(United Kingdom) David Coulthard	Williams-Renault	1:27.428	1:23.782	+1.874
10	3	(Japan) Ukyo Katayama	Tyrrell-Yamaha	1:27.017	1:23.969	+2.061
11	4	(United Kingdom) Mark Blundell	Tyrrell-Yamaha	1:25.863	1:23.981	+2.073
12	30	(Germany) Heinz-Harald Frentzen	Sauber-Mercedes	1:25.115	1:24.254	+2.346
13	15	(United Kingdom) Eddie Irvine	Jordan-Hart	1:26.368	1:24.930	+3.022
14	24	(Italy) Michele Alboreto	Minardi-Ford	1:26.595	1:24.996	+3.088
15	10	(Italy) Gianni Morbidelli	Footwork-Ford	1:27.459	1:25.018	+3.110
16	20	(France) Érik Comas	Larrousse-Ford	1:26.097	1:25.050	+3.142
17	19	(Monaco) Olivier Beretta	Larrousse-Ford	1:28.011	1:25.161	+3.253
18	23	(Italy) Pierluigi Martini	Minardi-Ford	1:25.502	1:25.247	+3.339
19	26	(France) Olivier Panis	Ligier-Renault	1:27.872	1:25.577	+3.669
20	25	(France) Éric Bernard	Ligier-Renault	1:28.289	1:25.766	+3.858
21	9	(Brazil) Christian Fittipaldi	Footwork-Ford	1:27.631	1:26.084	+4.176
22	12	(United Kingdom) Johnny Herbert	Lotus-Mugen-Honda	28:05.683	1:26.397	+4.489
23	11	(Italy) Alessandro Zanardi	Lotus-Mugen-Honda	1:30.379	1:27.685	+5.777
24	31	(Australia) David Brabham	Simtek-Ford	1:30.797	1:28.151	+6.243
25	34	(France) Bertrand Gachot	Pacific-Ilmor	1:34.318	1:28.873	+6.965
26	33	(France) Paul Belmondo	Pacific-Ilmor	1:31.750	1:30.657	+8.749
DNQ	32	(Italy) Andrea Montermini	Simtek-Ford	1:31.111	No time	+9.203

=== Race ===
Pos	No	Driver	Constructor	Laps	Time/Retired	Grid	Points
1	0	(United Kingdom) Damon Hill	Williams-Renault	65	1:36:14.374	2	10
2	5	(Germany) Michael Schumacher	Benetton-Ford	65	+ 24.166	1	6
3	4	(United Kingdom) Mark Blundell	Tyrrell-Yamaha	65	+ 1:26.969	11	4
4	27	(France) Jean Alesi	Ferrari	64	+ 1 lap	6	3
5	23	(Italy) Pierluigi Martini	Minardi-Ford	64	+ 1 lap	18	2
6	15	(United Kingdom) Eddie Irvine	Jordan-Hart	64	+ 1 lap	13	1
7	26	(France) Olivier Panis	Ligier-Renault	63	+ 2 laps	19	
8	25	(France) Éric Bernard	Ligier-Renault	62	+ 3 laps	20	
9	11	(Italy) Alessandro Zanardi	Lotus-Mugen-Honda	62	+ 3 laps	23	
10	31	(Australia) David Brabham	Simtek-Ford	61	+ 4 laps	24	
11	8	(United Kingdom) Martin Brundle	McLaren-Peugeot	59	Clutch	8	
Ret	6	(Finland) JJ Lehto	Benetton-Ford	53	Engine	4	
Ret	7	(Finland) Mika Häkkinen	McLaren-Peugeot	48	Engine	3	
Ret	12	(United Kingdom) Johnny Herbert	Lotus-Mugen-Honda	41	Spun off	22	
Ret	14	(Brazil) Rubens Barrichello	Jordan-Hart	39	Spun off	5	
Ret	9	(Brazil) Christian Fittipaldi	Footwork-Ford	35	Gearbox	21	
Ret	2	(United Kingdom) David Coulthard	Williams-Renault	32	Electrical	9	
Ret	34	(France) Bertrand Gachot	Pacific-Ilmor	32	Broken wing	25	
Ret	28	(Austria) Gerhard Berger	Ferrari	27	Gearbox	7	
Ret	10	(Italy) Gianni Morbidelli	Footwork-Ford	24	Fuel system	15	
Ret	30	(Germany) Heinz-Harald Frentzen	Sauber-Mercedes	21	Gearbox	12	
Ret	20	(France) Érik Comas	Larrousse-Ford	19	Radiator	16	
Ret	3	(Japan) Ukyo Katayama	Tyrrell-Yamaha	16	Engine	10	
Ret	24	(Italy) Michele Alboreto	Minardi-Ford	4	Engine	14	
Ret	33	(France) Paul Belmondo	Pacific-Ilmor	2	Spun off	26	
DNS	19	(Monaco) Olivier Beretta	Larrousse-Ford	0	Engine	17	

== Championship standings after the race ==
Drivers' Championship standings

Pos	Driver	Points
1	(Germany) Michael Schumacher	46
2	(United Kingdom) Damon Hill	17
3	(Austria) Gerhard Berger	10
4	(France) Jean Alesi	9
5	(Brazil) Rubens Barrichello	7

Constructors' Championship standings

Pos	Constructor	Points
1	(United Kingdom) Benetton-Ford	46
2	(Italy) Ferrari	25
3	(United Kingdom) Williams-Renault	17
4	(Republic of Ireland) Jordan-Hart	11
5	(United Kingdom) McLaren-Peugeot	10

Previous race: 1994 Monaco Grand Prix	FIA Formula One World Championship; 1994 season	Next race: 1994 Canadian Grand Prix
Previous race: 1993 Spanish Grand Prix	Spanish Grand Prix	Next race: 1995 Spanish Grand Prix
