= Simtek S951 =

Formula One car

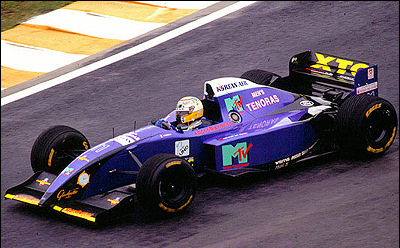
- Category: Formula One
- Constructor: Simtek
- Designers: Nick Wirth (Technical Director); Paul Crooks (Chief Designer)
- Predecessor: S941

Technical specifications
- Chassis: Carbon-fibre monocoque
- Suspension (front): Double wishbones, pushrod
- Suspension (rear): Double wishbones, pushrod
- Engine: Ford-Cosworth EDB1 3000 cc V8 (75°) naturally-aspirated
- Transmission: Benetton 6-speed semi-automatic transverse
- Power: 630 hp @ 13,200 rpm
- Weight: 595 kg (1,312 lb) including driver
- Fuel: Castrol
- Tyres: Goodyear

Competition history
- Notable entrants: MTV Simtek Ford
- Notable drivers: 11. (Italy) Domenico Schiattarella; 12. (Netherlands) Jos Verstappen
- Debut: 1995 Brazilian Grand Prix, Autódromo José Carlos Pace.
Races	Wins	Poles	F/Laps
5	0	0	0
- Constructors' Championships: 0
- Drivers' Championships: 0

The Simtek S951 was a Formula One car designed by Nick Wirth and Paul Crooks and used by Simtek for the 1995 season. The number 11 seat was taken by Domenico Schiattarella and the number 12 seat was taken by Jos Verstappen. The team's test driver was Hideki Noda. Noda was set to take the number 11 seat for the second half of the season, but the team folded after round five. The engine was a Ford-Cosworth EDB 3.0l V8. The team's main sponsor was MTV.

== Design and development ==
Simtek's pre-season launch. From left to right: Domenico Schiattarella, Jos Verstappen and Hideki Noda.

The car was designed by Simtek owner and technical director Nick Wirth, along with the chief designer of Simtek Research, Paul Crooks. It was a direct evolution of the 1994 season car, the S941. In order to secure a firm foothold in the sport following a traumatic season in which Roland Ratzenberger was killed at Imola whilst driving the S941, the team designed the S951 to be straightforward and uncomplicated.

One of the main changes was the change of the engine and gearboxes, as Simtek were given the old 1994 Benetton gearbox alongside the Ford-Cosworth EDB engine, which replaced the Ford-Cosworth HB engines. The Benetton gearboxes were used as part of the team's deal to employ Verstappen, who was loaned from his position as Benetton's test driver. The S951s were the last cars to be completed of all the 1995 F1 teams' chassis, arriving at the first round of the championship in Brazil with minimal testing.

== Racing history ==
The S951 was much more competitive than the S941 machine, with Verstappen and Schiattarella bringing the car to the finish on several occasions. Verstappen was able to qualify the car in the midfield at several races, his best being fourteenth at Argentina, although he only finished one race due to transmission unreliability. His best race performance came at the same race, where he ran in sixth place until his gearbox failed. Schiattarella, however, made the end to score the team's highest finish with ninth place.

Wirth revealed at the Monaco round, where both drivers failed to make the race start, that in the eighteen months the team had existed, that had amassed £6 million of debts, partially due to a deal that failed to materialise involving a con. Wirth decided against travelling to the Canadian GP in the hope of securing sponsorship for the next round in France, but this failed. The team went bankrupt and did not compete in any more rounds. The chassis was sold off in an auction in July 1995, with Verstappen's chassis selling for £18,000, with Schiattarella's chassis selling for £16,000.

== Later use ==
The S951 was not used until 2006, but two examples of it were used in the 2007 EuroBOSS Championship, with Paul Smith and Peter Alexander driving the chassis.

== Complete Formula One results ==
(key) (results in bold indicate pole position)

Year	Team	Engine	Tyres	Drivers	1	2	3	4	5	6	7	8	9	10	11	12	13	14	15	16	17	Points	WCC
1995	Simtek	Ford Cosworth V8	**G**		BRA	ARG	SMR	ESP	MON	CAN	FRA	GBR	GER	HUN	BEL	ITA	POR	EUR	PAC	JPN	AUS	**0**	**13th**
1995	Simtek	Ford Cosworth V8	**G**	Schiattarella	Ret	9	Ret	15	DNS													**0**	**13th**
1995	Simtek	Ford Cosworth V8	**G**	Verstappen	Ret	Ret	Ret	12	DNS													**0**	**13th**
