= 1994 European Grand Prix =

- Race 14 of 16 in the 1994 Formula One World Championship

Race details
- Date: 16 October 1994
- Official name: XXXIX Gran Premio de Europa
- Location: Circuito Permanente de Jerez; Jerez, Spain
- Course: Permanent racing facility
- Course length: 4.428 km (2.767 miles)
- Distance: 69 laps, 305.532 km (190.957 miles)
- Weather: Sunny

Pole position
Driver	(Germany) Michael Schumacher	Benetton-Ford
- Time: 1:22.762

Fastest lap
Driver	(Germany) Michael Schumacher	Benetton-Ford
- Time: 1:25.040 on lap 17

Podium
First	(Germany) Michael Schumacher	Benetton-Ford
Second	(United Kingdom) Damon Hill	Williams-Renault
Third	(Finland) Mika Häkkinen	McLaren-Peugeot

The 1994 European Grand Prix (formally the XXXIX Gran Premio de Europa) was a Formula One motor race held on 16 October 1994 at the Circuito Permanente de Jerez, Jerez, Spain. It was the fourteenth race of the 1994 Formula One World Championship.

The 69-lap race was won from pole position by Michael Schumacher, driving a Benetton-Ford. Schumacher, returning from a two-race ban, took his eighth victory of the season by 24.6 seconds from Drivers' Championship rival Damon Hill in the Williams-Renault, with Mika Häkkinen third in a McLaren-Peugeot.

The win put Schumacher five points ahead of Hill with two races remaining, while Benetton regained the lead of the Constructors' Championship from Williams.

== Background ==
The Argentine Grand Prix had been due to return to the Formula One calendar on this date, but ongoing modernisation of the Buenos Aires circuit meant that this was postponed until early in the 1995 season. A race at Jerez, the first since 1990, was organised in its place, and was given the title of the European Grand Prix, which had been used the previous year for the race at Donington Park.

Michael Schumacher returned to the Benetton team following his ban from the Italian and Portuguese Grands Prix, while Nigel Mansell returned to Williams, the 1994 CART season having ended the previous week. Elsewhere, Flavio Briatore bought Johnny Herbert's contract from Lotus's administrators and transferred him to Ligier, trading places with Éric Bernard, while rookies Hideki Noda and Domenico Schiattarella joined the Larrousse and Simtek teams respectively, replacing Yannick Dalmas and Jean-Marc Gounon.

== Qualifying ==
=== Qualifying report ===
Schumacher took pole from Drivers' Championship rival Damon Hill by 0.13 seconds, with Mansell third but five tenths of a second behind Hill. Heinz-Harald Frentzen took fourth in the Sauber, followed by Rubens Barrichello in the Jordan and Gerhard Berger in the Ferrari. Herbert was seventh in the Ligier, with Gianni Morbidelli in the Footwork, Mika Häkkinen in the McLaren and Eddie Irvine in the second Jordan completing the top ten. Debutants Noda and Schiattarella were 24th and 26th respectively, with the two Pacifics of Bertrand Gachot and Paul Belmondo once again failing to qualify.

=== Qualifying classification ===
Pos	No	Driver	Constructor	Q1 Time	Q2 Time	Gap
1	5	(Germany) Michael Schumacher	Benetton-Ford	1:24.207	1:22.762	
2	0	(United Kingdom) Damon Hill	Williams-Renault	1:24.137	1:22.892	+0.130
3	2	(United Kingdom) Nigel Mansell	Williams-Renault	1:24.971	1:23.392	+0.630
4	30	(Germany) Heinz-Harald Frentzen	Sauber-Mercedes	1:24.184	1:23.431	+0.669
5	14	(Brazil) Rubens Barrichello	Jordan-Hart	1:24.700	1:23.455	+0.693
6	28	(Austria) Gerhard Berger	Ferrari	1:25.079	1:23.677	+0.915
7	25	(United Kingdom) Johnny Herbert	Ligier-Renault	1:26.241	1:24.040	+1.278
8	10	(Italy) Gianni Morbidelli	Footwork-Ford	1:26.048	1:24.079	+1.317
9	7	(Finland) Mika Häkkinen	McLaren-Peugeot	1:25.275	1:24.122	+1.360
10	15	(United Kingdom) Eddie Irvine	Jordan-Hart	1:24.794	1:24.157	+1.395
11	26	(France) Olivier Panis	Ligier-Renault	1:25.384	1:24.432	+1.670
12	6	(Netherlands) Jos Verstappen	Benetton-Ford	1:35.441	1:24.643	+1.881
13	3	(Japan) Ukyo Katayama	Tyrrell-Yamaha	1:26.304	1:24.738	+1.976
14	4	(United Kingdom) Mark Blundell	Tyrrell-Yamaha	1:25.995	1:24.770	+2.008
15	8	(United Kingdom) Martin Brundle	McLaren-Peugeot	1:25.942	1:25.110	+2.348
16	27	(France) Jean Alesi	Ferrari	1:25.182	1:44.801	+2.420
17	23	(Italy) Pierluigi Martini	Minardi-Ford	1:25.812	1:25.294	+2.532
18	29	(Italy) Andrea de Cesaris	Sauber-Mercedes	1:25.407	1:25.411	+2.645
19	9	(Brazil) Christian Fittipaldi	Footwork-Ford	1:26.094	1:25.427	+2.665
20	24	(Italy) Michele Alboreto	Minardi-Ford	1:26.744	1:25.511	+2.749
21	12	(Italy) Alessandro Zanardi	Lotus-Mugen-Honda	1:26.973	1:25.557	+2.795
22	11	(France) Éric Bernard	Lotus-Mugen-Honda	1:28.047	1:25.595	+2.833
23	20	(France) Érik Comas	Larrousse-Ford	1:28.042	1:26.272	+3.510
24	19	(Japan) Hideki Noda	Larrousse-Ford	1:29.041	1:27.168	+4.406
25	31	(Australia) David Brabham	Simtek-Ford	1:28.388	1:27.201	+4.439
26	32	(Italy) Domenico Schiattarella	Simtek-Ford	1:30.069	1:27.976	+5.214
DNQ	34	(France) Bertrand Gachot	Pacific-Ilmor	1:30.099	1:29.488	+6.726
DNQ	33	(France) Paul Belmondo	Pacific-Ilmor	1:31.162	1:30.234	+7.472

== Race ==
=== Race report ===
At the start, Hill got ahead of Schumacher, while Mansell fell to sixth behind Frentzen, Barrichello and Berger. Mansell re-passed Berger on lap 2 and Barrichello on lap 6, before the Jordan driver got by again on lap 12. Noda's debut ended with a gearbox failure after ten laps; as he slowed, he was hit by Mansell, who subsequently pitted for a new nosecone and dropped out of contention.

Schumacher overtook Hill during the first round of pit stops; both were well clear of Frentzen - who was running a one-stop strategy - with Häkkinen up to fourth and Irvine fifth. Hill briefly went ahead again during the second stops, after which Schumacher retained a comfortable lead for the rest of the race. Frentzen's strategy backfired as he fell to seventh, behind Berger and Barrichello. Irvine moved ahead of Häkkinen and into third, only to be re-passed by the McLaren driver as a result of a quicker second stop. In the closing stages, Barrichello developed a left rear puncture, putting Frentzen back in the top six, just ahead of Ukyo Katayama's Tyrrell.

In a race of high reliability, nineteen cars were still running at the end, the last being Schiattarella (albeit five laps down), while Mansell was the last driver to retire, spinning off on lap 48. Schumacher's eventual margin of victory over Hill was 24.6 seconds, with another 45 seconds back to Häkkinen and a further nine back to Irvine, the last driver on the lead lap. Berger and Frentzen completed the top six, Frentzen holding off Katayama for the final point by 0.2 seconds. With two races remaining, Schumacher led Hill in the Drivers' Championship by five points, while Benetton moved back into the lead of the Constructors' Championship by two points from Williams.

In the second Sauber, Andrea de Cesaris made his 208th and final Grand Prix start, at the time second only to Riccardo Patrese in terms of the number of races. Karl Wendlinger was due to return to the Swiss team at the next race in Japan, following his crash at Monaco earlier in the season.

=== Race classification ===
Pos	No	Driver	Constructor	Laps	Time/Retired	Grid	Points
1	5	(Germany) Michael Schumacher	Benetton-Ford	69	1:40:26.689	1	10
2	0	(United Kingdom) Damon Hill	Williams-Renault	69	+ 24.689	2	6
3	7	(Finland) Mika Häkkinen	McLaren-Peugeot	69	+ 1:09.648	9	4
4	15	(United Kingdom) Eddie Irvine	Jordan-Hart	69	+ 1:18.446	10	3
5	28	(Austria) Gerhard Berger	Ferrari	68	+ 1 Lap	6	2
6	30	(Germany) Heinz-Harald Frentzen	Sauber-Mercedes	68	+ 1 Lap	4	1
7	3	(Japan) Ukyo Katayama	Tyrrell-Yamaha	68	+ 1 Lap	13	
8	25	(United Kingdom) Johnny Herbert	Ligier-Renault	68	+ 1 Lap	7	
9	26	(France) Olivier Panis	Ligier-Renault	68	+ 1 Lap	11	
10	27	(France) Jean Alesi	Ferrari	68	+ 1 Lap	16	
11	10	(Italy) Gianni Morbidelli	Footwork-Ford	68	+ 1 Lap	8	
12	14	(Brazil) Rubens Barrichello	Jordan-Hart	68	+ 1 Lap	5	
13	4	(United Kingdom) Mark Blundell	Tyrrell-Yamaha	68	+ 1 Lap	14	
14	24	(Italy) Michele Alboreto	Minardi-Ford	67	+ 2 Laps	20	
15	23	(Italy) Pierluigi Martini	Minardi-Ford	67	+ 2 Laps	17	
16	12	(Italy) Alessandro Zanardi	Lotus-Mugen-Honda	67	+ 2 Laps	21	
17	9	(Brazil) Christian Fittipaldi	Footwork-Ford	66	+ 3 Laps	19	
18	11	(France) Éric Bernard	Lotus-Mugen-Honda	66	+ 3 Laps	22	
19	32	(Italy) Domenico Schiattarella	Simtek-Ford	64	+ 5 Laps	26	
Ret	2	(United Kingdom) Nigel Mansell	Williams-Renault	47	Spun off	3	
Ret	31	(Australia) David Brabham	Simtek-Ford	42	Engine	25	
Ret	29	(Italy) Andrea de Cesaris	Sauber-Mercedes	37	Throttle	18	
Ret	20	(France) Érik Comas	Larrousse-Ford	37	Alternator	23	
Ret	6	(Netherlands) Jos Verstappen	Benetton-Ford	15	Spun off	12	
Ret	19	(Japan) Hideki Noda	Larrousse-Ford	10	Gearbox	24	
Ret	8	(United Kingdom) Martin Brundle	McLaren-Peugeot	8	Engine	15	

== Notes ==
- Last win for V8-engined Formula One car until their mandatory return at the 2006 Bahrain Grand Prix.

== Championship standings after the race ==
Drivers' Championship standings

Pos	Driver	Points
1	(Germany) Michael Schumacher	86
2	(United Kingdom) Damon Hill	81
3	(Austria) Gerhard Berger	35
4	(Finland) Mika Häkkinen	26
5	(France) Jean Alesi	19

Constructors' Championship standings

Pos	Constructor	Points
1	(United Kingdom) Benetton-Ford	97
2	(United Kingdom) Williams-Renault	95
3	(Italy) Ferrari	60
4	(United Kingdom) McLaren-Peugeot	38
5	(Republic of Ireland) Jordan-Hart	23

Previous race: 1994 Portuguese Grand Prix	FIA Formula One World Championship; 1994 season	Next race: 1994 Japanese Grand Prix
Previous race: 1993 European Grand Prix; Previous race at Jerez: 1990 Spanish Grand Prix	European Grand Prix	Next race: 1995 European Grand Prix; Next race at Jerez: 1997 European Grand Prix
