= 1994 Monaco Grand Prix =

Fourth round of the 1994 Formula One World Championship

Coordinates: 43°44′4.74″N 7°25′16.8″E

- Race 4 of 16 in the 1994 Formula One World Championship
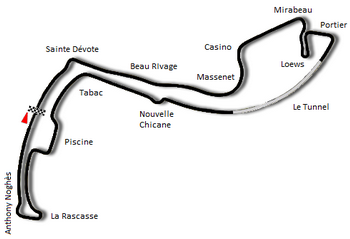

Race details
- Date: 15 May 1994
- Official name: LII Grand Prix Automobile de Monaco
- Location: Circuit de Monaco, Monte Carlo
- Course: Street circuit
- Course length: 3.328 km (2.068 miles)
- Distance: 78 laps, 259.584 km (161.298 miles)
- Weather: Sunny

Pole position
Driver	(Germany) Michael Schumacher	Benetton-Ford
- Time: 1:18.560

Fastest lap
Driver	(Germany) Michael Schumacher	Benetton-Ford
- Time: 1:21.076 on lap 35 (lap record)

Podium
First	(Germany) Michael Schumacher	Benetton-Ford
Second	(United Kingdom) Martin Brundle	McLaren-Peugeot
Third	(Austria) Gerhard Berger	Ferrari

The 1994 Monaco Grand Prix was a Formula One motor race held on 15 May 1994 at the Circuit de Monaco, Monte Carlo. It was the fourth race of the 1994 Formula One World Championship, and the first following the deaths of Ayrton Senna and Roland Ratzenberger at the San Marino Grand Prix two weeks previously.

The 78-lap race was won from pole position by Michael Schumacher driving a Benetton-Ford, his fourth victory from the first four races of 1994. Martin Brundle finished second in a McLaren-Peugeot, with Gerhard Berger third in a Ferrari.

== Report ==
=== Background ===
After the deaths of Ayrton Senna and Roland Ratzenberger at the San Marino Grand Prix, sweeping changes were announced by the FIA to the rules and regulations of Formula One in a bid to improve safety. The majority were scheduled to come into force after the Monaco Grand Prix, but an 80 km/h pit-lane speed limit was brought into force in time for this race.

Both Williams and Simtek, the teams for whom Senna and Ratzenberger drove, ran only one car each during the race weekend.

Eddie Irvine was serving the third race of his three-race ban issued to him for his part in the crash during the Brazilian Grand Prix. Andrea de Cesaris again took Irvine's place at Jordan, whilst Irvine acted as a pit-lane reporter for ESPN.

Olivier Beretta became the first Monégasque to compete in the Monaco Grand Prix since André Testut in 1959. This was the last time a driver from Monaco competed in his home race, until Charles Leclerc took part in the 2018 race.

=== Practice and qualifying ===
During the first free practice session on Thursday morning, Austrian driver Karl Wendlinger had a major accident at the Nouvelle Chicane. Travelling at almost 280 km/h (170 mph) he appeared to brake too late, and the car slid sideways into the water-filled barriers. Wendlinger was knocked unconscious and was taken initially to the Princess Grace Hospital, and later to Saint Roch Hospital in Nice. He suffered a serious head injury and remained in a coma for several weeks. The Sauber-Mercedes team decided to withdraw from the race after this incident.

Michael Schumacher claimed the first pole position of his Grand Prix career (and the first for a German driver since the 1961 Italian Grand Prix with Wolfgang von Trips, the race in which he suffered his fatal accident). Mika Häkkinen qualified second, which was also the highest starting position thus far in his career. Martin Brundle qualified 2nd in the first qualifying session on the Thursday, three tenths of a second in front of team mate Mika Häkkinen, but could not repeat this on the Saturday and dropped to 8th.

=== Race ===
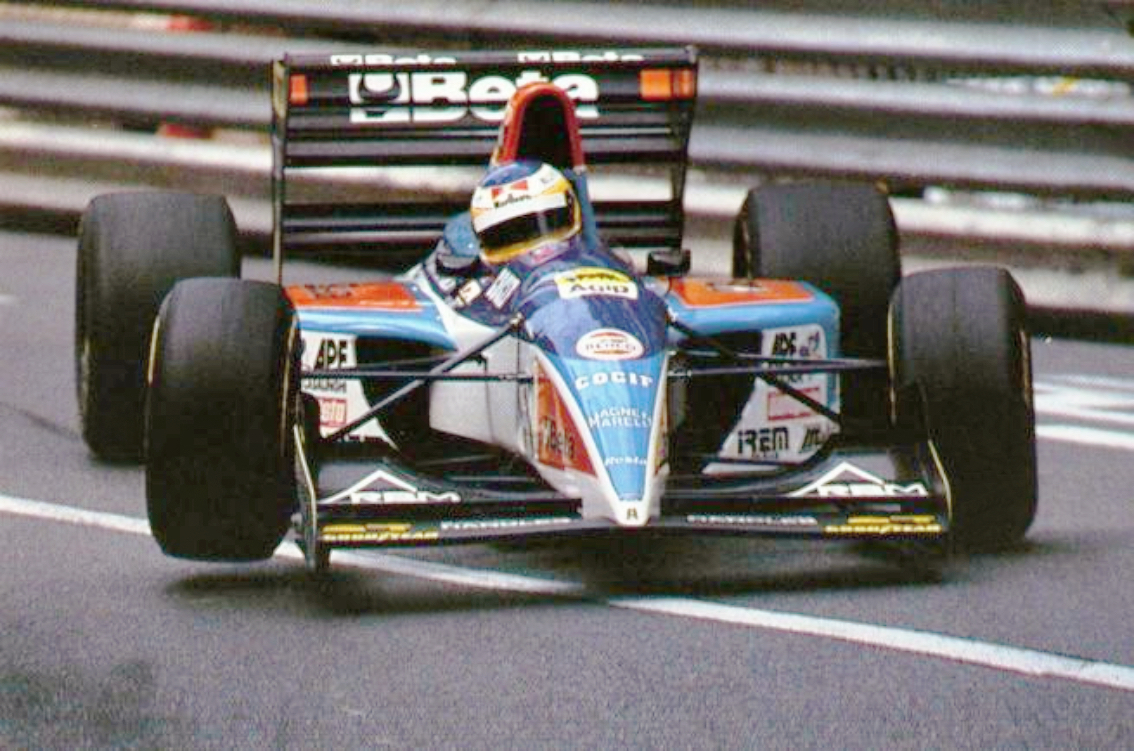
Michele Alboreto finished sixth in his Minardi, scoring his last point in Formula One.

As a mark of respect for Senna and Ratzenberger, the FIA decided to leave the first two grid positions empty for the race and painted them with the colours of the Brazilian and Austrian flags. For the first time since the 1959 United States Grand Prix, there was no previous World Champion competing in the race and also no former Monaco Grand Prix winner. There were also only four previous race winners: Schumacher, Hill, Berger and Alboreto.

At the start of the race, Damon Hill clipped the left rear tyre of Mika Häkkinen's McLaren just before the Sainte Dévote corner. Häkkinen retired immediately, while Hill continued for a few corners before retiring with broken right front suspension. Gianni Morbidelli and Pierluigi Martini also collided before Sainte Dévote, putting each other out. Eric Bernard in the second Ligier had soon spun out of the race at the Nouvelle chicane.

Katayama retired his Tyrrell from 6th position on lap 39 when his gearbox failed, as of which by lap 41, the engine on Mark Blundell's Tyrrell failed, leaving oil on the track at Sainte Dévote retiring 2 laps after Katayama which Schumacher, leading the race, had to avoid. The second placed Ferrari of Gerhard Berger did slip on the oil, however, and required a three-point turn to escape from the run off area beside the stricken Tyrrell. Berger returned to the track still in his second place, but dirty tyres left him vulnerable to the McLaren of Martin Brundle, who promptly overtook him down the outside of Mirabeau on the same lap. Christian Fittipaldi in his Footwork-Ford ran close behind the Ferraris of Berger and Alesi in fourth position until his first refuelling stop near the start of the race. Fittipaldi continued to run strongly in a points position until lap 47 when the gearbox failed.

The race was led from start to finish by Schumacher, who continued his perfect start to the 1994 season with four victories in the first four races. As Schumacher also held the fastest lap, this meant he scored the first Grand Slam of his career, and he was the first driver other than Alain Prost or Ayrton Senna to win the Monaco Grand Prix since 1983. Brundle's second place equalled the best finish of his F1 career. Michele Alboreto finished sixth in his Minardi to score his final point in F1.

=== Post-race ===
This is more or less where I live now so this victory means a lot. I am very pleased that we came here with the car sorted out after a few small problems and we were very competitive. I am very happy that Formula One set such an example.

— Michael Schumacher commenting about victory, Transcript of recording from Grand Prix Racing.

This is a great day for me and I am so glad to achieve this for my loyal and patient fans. Today was one of the best days in my racing career. I made a perfect start and had a faultless race. It has been a very difficult time. When your five-year-old daughter asks you if it's true [Ayrton] Senna is dead it is difficult to reconcile things.

— Martin Brundle on his second place and Ayrton Senna, Transcript of recording from Grand Prix Racing.

== Classification ==
=== Qualifying ===
Pos	No	Driver	Constructor	Q1 Time	Q2 Time	Gap
1	5	(Germany) Michael Schumacher	Benetton-Ford	1:20.230	1:18.560	
2	7	(Finland) Mika Häkkinen	McLaren-Peugeot	1:21.881	1:19.488	+0.928
3	28	(Austria) Gerhard Berger	Ferrari	1:22.038	1:19.958	+1.398
4	0	(United Kingdom) Damon Hill	Williams-Renault	1:22.605	1:20.079	+1.519
5	27	(France) Jean Alesi	Ferrari	1:22.521	1:20.452	+1.892
6	9	(Brazil) Christian Fittipaldi	Footwork-Ford	1:23.588	1:21.053	+2.493
7	10	(Italy) Gianni Morbidelli	Footwork-Ford	1:23.580	1:21.189	+2.629
8	8	(United Kingdom) Martin Brundle	McLaren-Peugeot	1:21.580	1:21.222	+2.662
9	23	(Italy) Pierluigi Martini	Minardi-Ford	1:23.162	1:21.288	+2.728
10	4	(United Kingdom) Mark Blundell	Tyrrell-Yamaha	1:23.522	1:21.614	+3.054
11	3	(Japan) Ukyo Katayama	Tyrrell-Yamaha	1:24.488	1:21.731	+3.171
12	24	(Italy) Michele Alboreto	Minardi-Ford	1:25.421	1:21.793	+3.233
13	20	(France) Érik Comas	Larrousse-Ford	1:23.514	1:22.211	+3.651
14	15	(Italy) Andrea de Cesaris	Jordan-Hart	1:24.519	1:22.265	+3.701
15	14	(Brazil) Rubens Barrichello	Jordan-Hart	1:24.731	1:22.359	+3.799
16	12	(United Kingdom) Johnny Herbert	Lotus-Mugen-Honda	1:24.103	1:22.375	+3.815
17	6	(Finland) JJ Lehto	Benetton-Ford	1:23.885	1:22.679	+4.119
18	19	(Monaco) Olivier Beretta	Larrousse-Ford	1:24.126	1:23.025	+4.465
19	11	(Portugal) Pedro Lamy	Lotus-Mugen-Honda	1:25.859	1:23.858	+5.298
20	26	(France) Olivier Panis	Ligier-Renault	1:25.115	1:24.131	+5.571
21	25	(France) Éric Bernard	Ligier-Renault	1:27.694	1:24.377	+5.817
22	31	(Australia) David Brabham	Simtek-Ford	1:26.690	1:24.656	+6.096
23	34	(France) Bertrand Gachot	Pacific-Ilmor	1:48.173	1:26.082	+7.522
24	33	(France) Paul Belmondo	Pacific-Ilmor	1:29.984	8:36.897	+11.424
WD	30	(Germany) Heinz-Harald Frentzen	Sauber-Mercedes			
WD	29	(Austria) Karl Wendlinger	Sauber-Mercedes			

=== Race ===
Pos	No	Driver	Constructor	Laps	Time/Retired	Grid	Points
1	5	(Germany) Michael Schumacher	Benetton-Ford	78	1:49:55.372	1	10
2	8	(United Kingdom) Martin Brundle	McLaren-Peugeot	78	+ 37.278	8	6
3	28	(Austria) Gerhard Berger	Ferrari	78	+ 1:16.824	3	4
4	15	(Italy) Andrea de Cesaris	Jordan-Hart	77	+ 1 Lap	14	3
5	27	(France) Jean Alesi	Ferrari	77	+ 1 Lap	5	2
6	24	(Italy) Michele Alboreto	Minardi-Ford	77	+ 1 Lap	12	1
7	6	(Finland) JJ Lehto	Benetton-Ford	77	+ 1 Lap	17	
8	19	(Monaco) Olivier Beretta	Larrousse-Ford	76	+ 2 Laps	18	
9	26	(France) Olivier Panis	Ligier-Renault	76	+ 2 Laps	20	
10	20	(France) Érik Comas	Larrousse-Ford	75	+ 3 Laps	13	
11	11	(Portugal) Pedro Lamy	Lotus-Mugen-Honda	73	+ 5 Laps	19	
Ret	12	(United Kingdom) Johnny Herbert	Lotus-Mugen-Honda	68	Gearbox	16	
Ret	33	(France) Paul Belmondo	Pacific-Ilmor	53	Physical	24	
Ret	34	(France) Bertrand Gachot	Pacific-Ilmor	49	Gearbox	23	
Ret	9	(Brazil) Christian Fittipaldi	Footwork-Ford	47	Gearbox	6	
Ret	31	(Australia) David Brabham	Simtek-Ford	45	Engine	22	
Ret	4	(United Kingdom) Mark Blundell	Tyrrell-Yamaha	40	Engine	10	
Ret	3	(Japan) Ukyo Katayama	Tyrrell-Yamaha	38	Gearbox	11	
Ret	25	(France) Éric Bernard	Ligier-Renault	34	Spun off	21	
Ret	14	(Brazil) Rubens Barrichello	Jordan-Hart	27	Electrical	15	
Ret	7	(Finland) Mika Häkkinen	McLaren-Peugeot	0	Collision	2	
Ret	0	(United Kingdom) Damon Hill	Williams-Renault	0	Collision damage	4	
Ret	10	(Italy) Gianni Morbidelli	Footwork-Ford	0	Collision	7	
Ret	23	(Italy) Pierluigi Martini	Minardi-Ford	0	Collision	9	
WD	30	(Germany) Heinz-Harald Frentzen	Sauber-Mercedes		Withdrawn		
DNS	29	(Austria) Karl Wendlinger	Sauber-Mercedes		Injury		

== Championship standings after the race ==
Drivers' Championship standings

Pos	Driver	Points
1	(Germany) Michael Schumacher	40
2	(Austria) Gerhard Berger	10
3	(United Kingdom) Damon Hill	7
4	(Brazil) Rubens Barrichello	7
5	(United Kingdom) Martin Brundle	6

Constructors' Championship standings

Pos	Constructor	Points
1	(United Kingdom) Benetton-Ford	40
2	(Italy) Ferrari	22
3	(United Kingdom) McLaren-Peugeot	10
4	(Republic of Ireland) Jordan-Hart	10
5	(United Kingdom) Williams-Renault	7

Previous race: 1994 San Marino Grand Prix	FIA Formula One World Championship; 1994 season	Next race: 1994 Spanish Grand Prix
Previous race: 1993 Monaco Grand Prix	Monaco Grand Prix	Next race: 1995 Monaco Grand Prix
