= Simtek =

Engineering company and Formula One team

- Full name: MTV Simtek Ford
- Base: Banbury, Oxfordshire, United Kingdom
- Founder(s): Max Mosley; Nick Wirth
- Noted drivers: (Australia) David Brabham (Austria) Roland Ratzenberger (Italy) Andrea Montermini (France) Jean-Marc Gounon (Italy) Domenico Schiattarella (Japan) Taki Inoue (Netherlands) Jos Verstappen

Formula One World Championship career
- First entry: 1994 Brazilian Grand Prix
- Races entered: 20
- Engines: Ford
- Constructors' Championships: 0
- Drivers' Championships: 0
- Race victories: 0
- Pole positions: 0
- Fastest laps: 0
- Final entry: 1995 Monaco Grand Prix

Simtek (Simulation Technology) was an engineering consultancy firm and Formula One racing team. The Formula One (F1) engineering consultancy arm, Simtek Research, was founded in 1989 by Max Mosley and Nick Wirth. It originally was involved in many areas of Formula One, including wind tunnel construction and chassis building for third parties. Simtek Grand Prix, the racing team, was launched in 1993 and competed in the 1994 and 1995 seasons, achieving a best result of ninth place. With large debts and a lack of sponsorship money, Simtek went into voluntary liquidation in June 1995.

== Simtek Research ==
Simtek Research was founded in August 1989 by Nick Wirth, Max Mosley and Donald Hughes, aiming to provide a cost-effective design, research and development service to the highest possible standards. The company was initially based out of an office in Wirth's home with one employee, engineer Darren Davis. The company grew quickly and moved to its own facility, including a windtunnel, on the Acres Industrial Estate in Banbury, Oxfordshire. Simtek's clients included the FIA, F1 constructors Ligier and numerous Formula 3000 and Indycar teams.

In 1990 Simtek designed a Formula One car for BMW who were making plans to found a works team. The project was aborted, and BMW instead entered the German Touring Car Championship (Deutsche Tourenwagen Meisterschaft) in 1991, the BMW 3 Series cars being run by Simtek engineers. The BMW F1 car design was revived, updated and sold to Andrea Moda Formula to compete in the 1992 season. In 1992, after becoming president of the FIA, Mosley sold his share in Simtek to Wirth.

In 1993, Simtek were commissioned to design a car for the new Bravo F1 team, but the plans were scrapped after the sudden death of Bravo's project backer, Jean-François Mosnier.

== Formula One ==
=== 1994 ===
In August 1993, Nick Wirth took the decision to enter Formula One with his own team for the 1994 season. Triple world champion Jack Brabham became a shareholder in Simtek Grand Prix, and his son David Brabham was signed as a driver before the end of 1993. Andrea de Cesaris and Gil de Ferran, both carrying sponsorship money, were initially considered for the second seat but negotiations broke down. Frenchman Jean-Marc Gounon was also considered, but already had commitments for the start of the season so eventually 33-year-old F1 rookie Roland Ratzenberger took the place. Charlie Moody, a former Leyton House manager, was appointed Simtek's team manager.

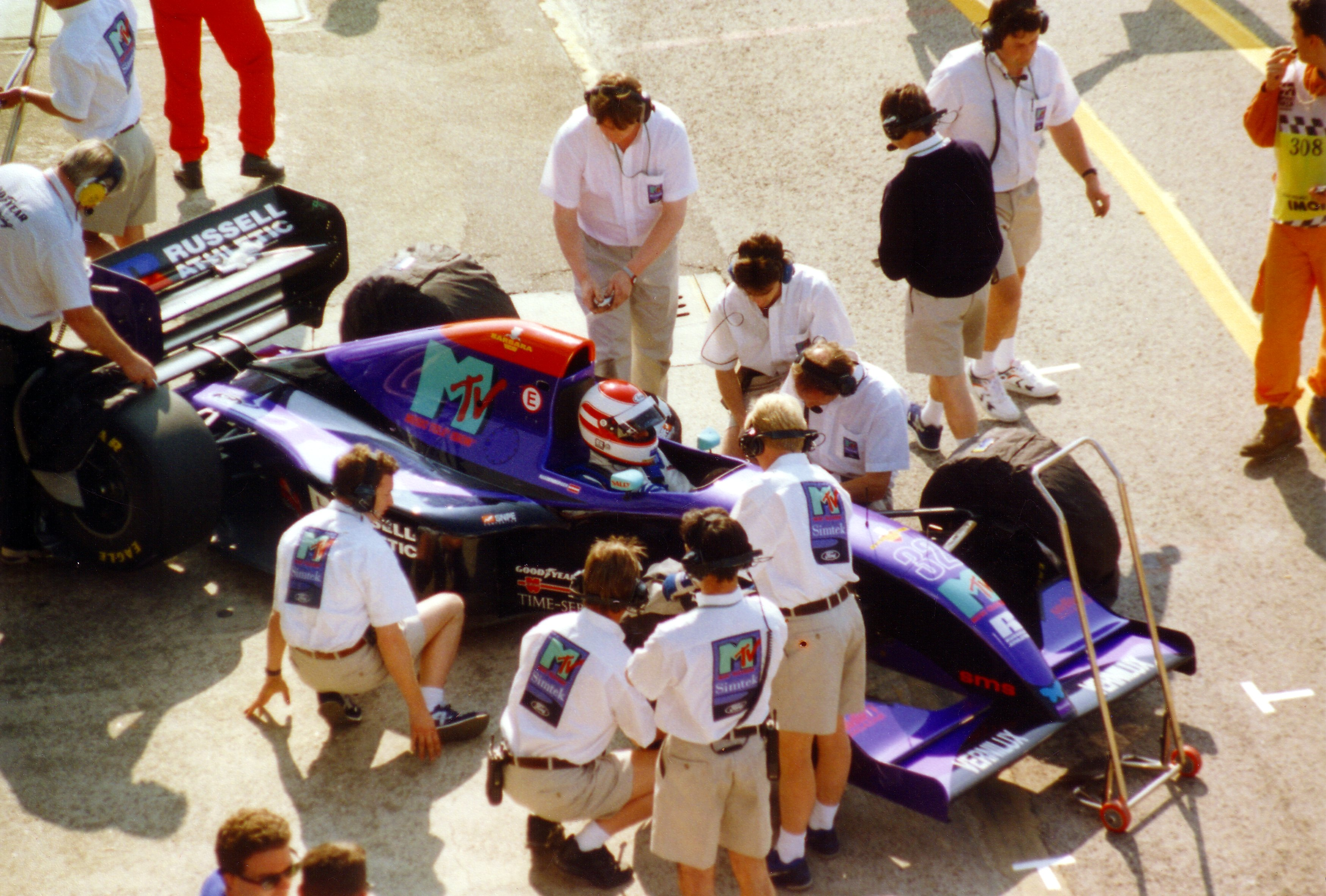
Roland Ratzenberger's Simtek at the 1994 San Marino Grand Prix, prior to his fatal accident.

The company secured customer Ford HB V8 engines from Cosworth, and prior to the season starting, MTV Europe stepped in as title sponsors. Wirth's initial design for the 1994 race car included active suspension, a technology used by Williams to win both the drivers and constructors championships in 1992 and 1993. However, active suspension was banned prior to the start of the 1994 season, and so Simtek were forced to revert to a more conservative design, named the S941. This design was heavy, initially included a fully manual gearbox compared to the semi-automatics being used by the frontrunning teams and the Ford HB engine was less powerful than the engines being used by the front-runners. The company employed 35 people, the fewest of any team competing in Formula One during 1994, and only 10% of the number employed by Scuderia Ferrari.

These deficits showed at the first race of the 1994 season. Brabham qualified in 26th and last place while Ratzenberger failed to qualify. Brabham finished the race 12th, but all cars behind him retired. The next race saw both Simteks qualifying but again occupying the back of the grid. Brabham retired early with an electrical failure, and Ratzenberger finished 11th, last of the cars still running.

I lost a close friend yesterday. Though team-mates for a mere few weeks, we had already a lot of fun together and had every reason to look forward to a great year with the Simtek team. I am confident that the greatest tribute we can pay to Roland is to race today, hence my decision.

— David Brabham, on Ratzenberger and his decision to race following Roland's death.

The next round was the 1994 San Marino Grand Prix. During the Saturday qualifying session, Ratzenberger left the track during an out-lap dislodging his front wing. After rejoining the track, Ratzenberger decided the car wasn't damaged, and eager to ensure qualification for the race the next day began a flying lap. At the Villeneuve curva while traveling at 190 mph (310 km/h) the front wing failed, causing Ratzenberger to lose control and the car crashed into a concrete wall. Ratzenberger suffered a basal skull fracture, and was killed instantly. A time posted earlier in the qualifying session by Ratzenberger would have given him the 26th position on the grid. His death was the first at a Grand Prix weekend in 12 years. Traditionally, the team would have withdrawn from the event, but David Brabham decided to race on, in tribute to Ratzenberger and in order to raise the morale of a devastated Simtek team. During the ESPN broadcast of the race, it was stated that Brabham was reluctant to race but was encouraged to race by officials who wanted to keep the field full. Only a day after Ratzenberger's death would another driver - three-time world champion Ayrton Senna - be killed in an accident during the race itself. Senna's death marked the second driver fatality of the weekend.

Brabham's decision to continue racing, in part resulted in Simtek making a collective decision to continue racing and "For Roland" was painted on the airbox of the car, to show their reason for continuing. The team only had one chassis to enter at the Monaco Grand Prix, and before the start, a minute's silence was held in memory of Senna and Ratzenberger with the second grid slot painted with the Austrian flag. In Spain, Andrea Montermini drove for the team, but during the practice session crashed heavily. He escaped with only a broken toe and cracked left heel but was unable to race and his Simtek chassis was badly damaged. After another one car entry in Canada, Jean-Marc Gounon became available to the team for the French Grand Prix. He finished the race ninth, the team's best finish of the season, in part down to high attrition but finishing ahead of Mark Blundell's Tyrrell which was still running. Both cars qualified for all the remaining Grands Prix, ahead of the Pacifics, and occasionally also Lotus and Larrousse. Brabham qualified in 21st for the Belgian Grand Prix, ahead of a Lotus, Larrousse, Footwork and Tyrrell car.

Three races before the end of the season, Domenico Schiattarella took over Gounon's race seat finishing 19th. He was replaced for the penultimate round in Japan by another pay driver Taki Inoue, but his race ended after three laps when he crashed into the pit wall. Schiattarella was reinstated for the final round at Adelaide, but both Simteks retired from the race with technical problems.

After a challenging debut season the team finished with no world championship points but, convinced that Simtek could do better, Wirth decided to continue the Grand Prix programme.

=== 1995 ===
MTV Europe's sponsorship commitment was reduced for the 1995 season, but they remained title sponsors to the team. Rather than money, MTV paid Simtek with airtime on their television channel. This airtime was then sold by Simtek to its other sponsors for them to show commercials. Cosworth again supplied engines to the team, with the more up-to-date Ford ED. These were combined with former Benetton gearboxes and Wirth designed a new chassis, the S951.

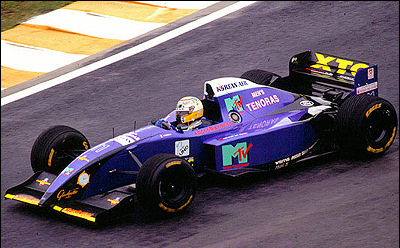
The Simtek S951 driven by Domenico Schiattarella in 1995.

David Brabham was made an offer by BMW to race in the British Touring Car Championship, and accepted. He was replaced by Jos Verstappen, who was seeking more experience after an incident-filled season at Benetton in 1994. The second seat was kept by Domenico Schiattarella for the first half of the season, while Hideki Noda paid a deposit to secure the place for the latter races.

Both cars retired from the opening round, but the second round in Argentina brought much promise. Verstappen qualified 14th for the race and moved up to sixth by the first pitstop. A slow pitstop dropped him down the order and then his gearbox failed the following lap. Schiattarella finished ninth, equaling the team's best finish the previous season. Verstappen's gearbox also failed at the next race in San Marino. Schiattarella retired with suspension failure. Spain brought 12th and 15th-placed finishes for the team, but there were bigger problems behind the scenes. In the 18 months the team had been in existence, they had amassed £6 million worth of debt.

At Monaco, neither driver completed a lap of the race due to another gearbox failure on Verstappen's car, and the marshals failing to recover Schiattarella's car after the first aborted race start. Following the race Wirth wrote, in one of his regular Usenet newsgroup postings, that "a major new backer of the team, with whom I had signed a contract before the season, has finally pulled out and left a large hole in our finances". Wirth frantically tried to convince potential sponsors to come forward, threatening to shut down the team if none did so. In the event a sponsor could be found, existing sponsors MTV, Russell Athletic and Korean Air pledged to increase their own sponsorship commitments. The team did not appear at the Canadian Grand Prix, but were not fined by the sports commercial rights holders, FOM, for their absence. The CEO of FOM, Bernie Ecclestone agreed that the team entered the championship intending to compete in 16 races and as the championship was extended to 17, they were permitted to miss one race.

Negotiations with the potential backers and sponsors failed, and the companies that would pay for Hideki Noda to drive the Simtek were severely affected by the Kobe earthquake. Prior to the next race, Simtek Grand Prix went into voluntary liquidation and the receivers, Touche Ross, were called in. The collapse of the Formula One team also forced Simtek Research to declare itself bankrupt. In total, 48 jobs were lost and with the team unable to be sold as a going concern, Simtek's assets were auctioned off.

== Complete Formula One results ==
(key) (results in bold indicate pole position)

Year	Chassis	Engine	Tyres	Drivers	1	2	3	4	5	6	7	8	9	10	11	12	13	14	15	16	17	Points	WCC
1994	S941	Ford HBD6 3.5 V8	G		BRA	PAC	SMR	MON	ESP	CAN	FRA	GBR	GER	HUN	BEL	ITA	POR	EUR	JPN	AUS		0	NC
1994	S941	Ford HBD6 3.5 V8	G	(Australia) David Brabham	12	Ret	Ret	Ret	10	14	Ret	15	Ret	11	Ret	Ret	Ret	Ret	12	Ret		0	NC
1994	S941	Ford HBD6 3.5 V8	G	(Austria) Roland Ratzenberger	DNQ	11	DNS															0	NC
1994	S941	Ford HBD6 3.5 V8	G	(Italy) Andrea Montermini					DNQ													0	NC
1994	S941	Ford HBD6 3.5 V8	G	(France) Jean-Marc Gounon							9	16	Ret	Ret	11	Ret	15					0	NC
1994	S941	Ford HBD6 3.5 V8	G	(Italy) Domenico Schiattarella														19		Ret		0	NC
1994	S941	Ford HBD6 3.5 V8	G	(Japan) Taki Inoue															Ret			0	NC
1995	S951	Ford EDB 3.0 V8	G		BRA	ARG	SMR	ESP	MON	CAN	FRA	GBR	GER	HUN	BEL	ITA	POR	EUR	PAC	JPN	AUS	0	NC
1995	S951	Ford EDB 3.0 V8	G	(Italy) Domenico Schiattarella	Ret	9	Ret	15	DNS													0	NC
1995	S951	Ford EDB 3.0 V8	G	(Netherlands) Jos Verstappen	Ret	Ret	Ret	12	DNS													0	NC
