= 1994 Belgian Grand Prix =

Eleventh round of the 1994 Formula One World Championship

- Race 11 of 16 in the 1994 Formula One World Championship

Race details
- Date: 28 August 1994
- Official name: LII Grand Prix de Belgique
- Location: Circuit de Spa-Francorchamps; Francorchamps, Wallonia, Belgium
- Course: Permanent racing facility
- Course length: 7.001 km (4.350 miles)
- Distance: 44 laps, 308.044 km (191.410 miles)
- Weather: Sunny

Pole position
Driver	(Brazil) Rubens Barrichello	Jordan-Hart
- Time: 2:21.163

Fastest lap
Driver	(United Kingdom) Damon Hill	Williams-Renault
- Time: 1:57.117 on lap 41 (lap record)

Podium
First	(United Kingdom) Damon Hill	Williams-Renault
Second	(Finland) Mika Häkkinen	McLaren-Peugeot
Third	(Netherlands) Jos Verstappen	Benetton-Ford

The 1994 Belgian Grand Prix was a Formula One motor race held on 28 August 1994 at the Circuit de Spa-Francorchamps, near the village of Francorchamps, Wallonia. It was the eleventh race of the 1994 Formula One World Championship.

The 44-lap race was won by British driver Damon Hill, driving a Williams-Renault. After Brazilian Rubens Barrichello took the first pole position for the Jordan team, German Michael Schumacher crossed the finish line first in his Benetton-Ford, only to be disqualified due to excessive wear on the wooden skid block underneath his car. Hill was thus awarded the win, his third of the season, with Finn Mika Häkkinen second in a McLaren-Peugeot and Schumacher's Dutch teammate Jos Verstappen third.

This was the last time a race-winning driver was disqualified in Formula One until George Russell thirty years later at the same event.

== Report ==
=== Background ===
Having deputised for a suspended Mika Häkkinen at McLaren at the previous race in Hungary, Philippe Alliot now returned to his old Larrousse team for this race, taking the place of Olivier Beretta. Meanwhile, the cash-strapped Lotus replaced Alessandro Zanardi with local driver Philippe Adams, who brought significant funding to the team.

Following the deaths of Roland Ratzenberger and Ayrton Senna at Imola earlier in the season, a chicane was installed at Eau Rouge to slow the cars.

=== Qualifying ===
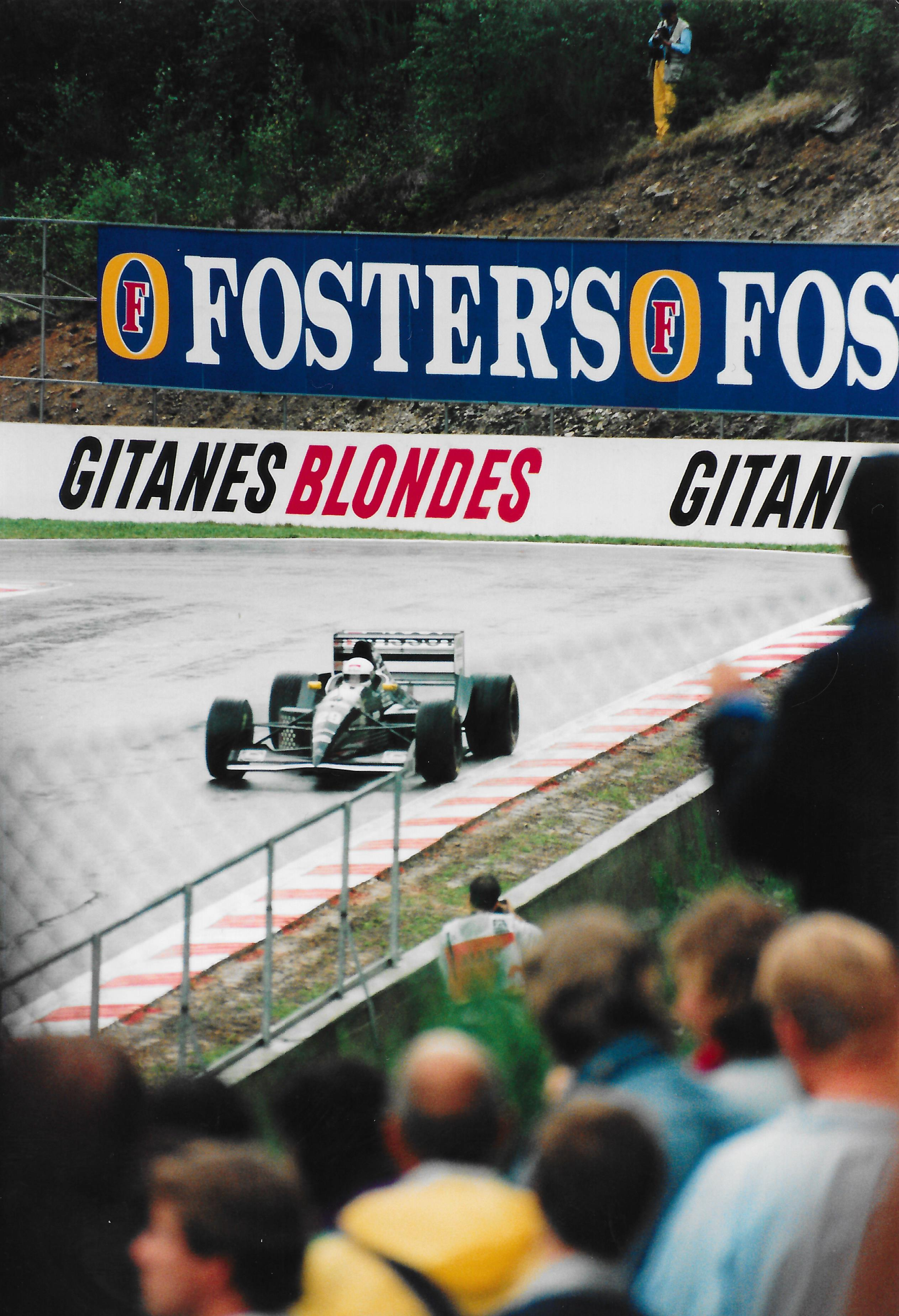
Andrea de Cesaris exiting the Bus Stop chicane in his Sauber C13.

The Friday qualifying session was held in wet but drying conditions. Towards the end of the session, the Jordan cars were sent out on slick tyres, and Rubens Barrichello duly put his car on provisional pole with teammate Eddie Irvine fourth. More rain fell on Saturday, with most of the drivers lapping several seconds slower than the day before, and only Christian Fittipaldi improving his time. Thus, Barrichello took the first pole position of his career and the first for Jordan. At 22 years and 98 days, Barrichello became the youngest ever F1 polesitter up to that point, beating the record set by Andrea de Cesaris at the 1982 United States Grand Prix West.

Drivers' Championship leader Michael Schumacher was second in his Benetton, with Damon Hill third in his Williams. After Irvine came Jean Alesi in the Ferrari, Jos Verstappen in the second Benetton, David Coulthard in the second Williams and the returning Häkkinen, with Heinz-Harald Frentzen in the Sauber and Pierluigi Martini in the Minardi completing the top ten.

=== Race ===
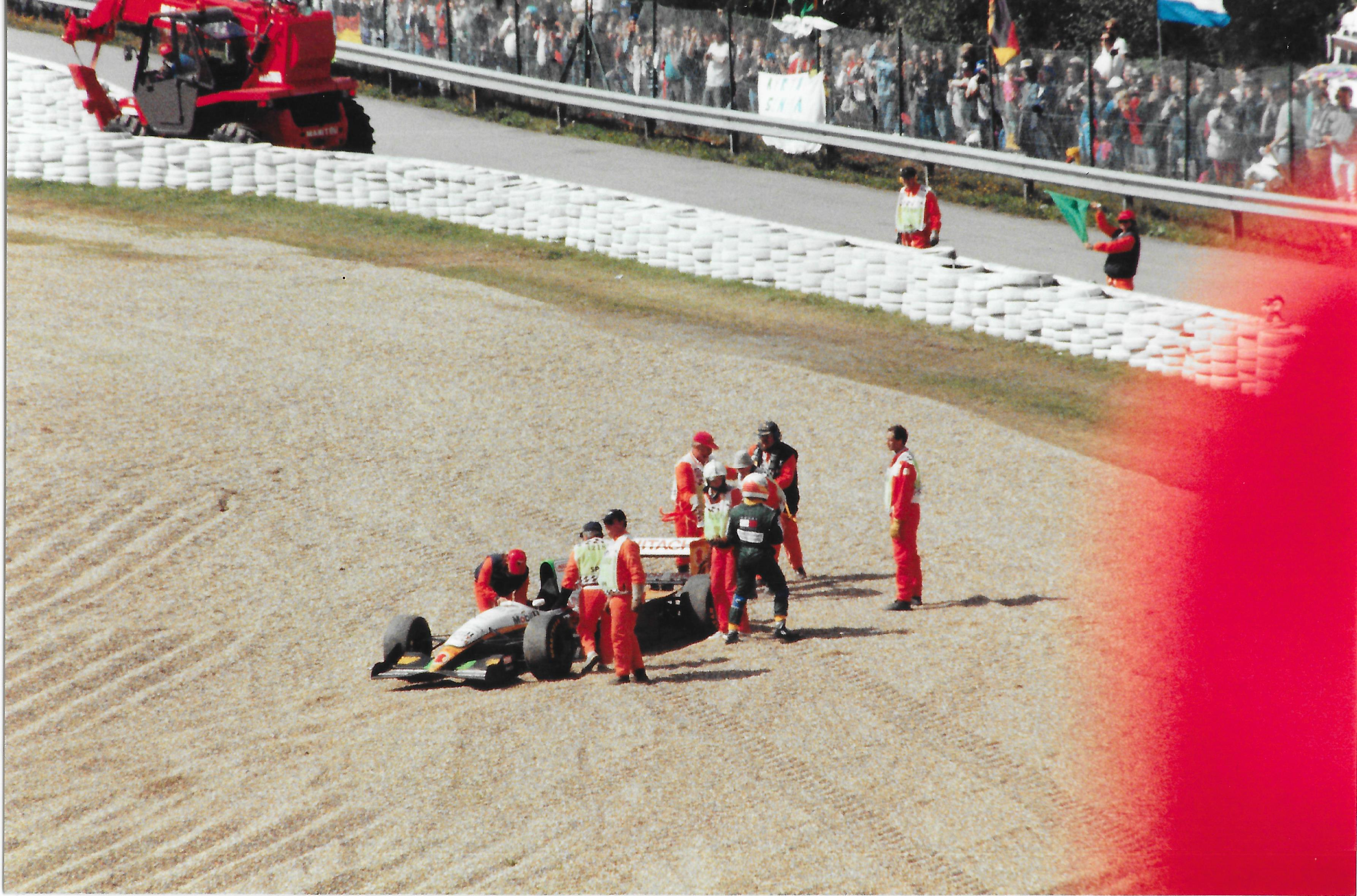
Local driver Philippe Adams spun his Lotus 109 out of the race on lap 16.

In dry conditions, Barrichello led away from Schumacher and a fast-starting Alesi. Schumacher passed Barrichello at Les Combes, and Alesi soon followed, only for his engine to fail on lap 3. With the Jordans struggling to hold on to track position against faster cars, Hill moved into second, ahead of Coulthard and Häkkinen. Gerhard Berger in the remaining Ferrari also retired with engine failure by lap 12. Philippe Adams who made his debut Grand Prix appearance at his home circuit soon spun out into the gravel trap, five laps after Berger retired.

Coulthard overtook teammate Hill during the first round of pit stops, while Barrichello moved back up to second before making his stop. On lap 19, Schumacher spun exiting Fagnes but retained the lead; the following lap, Barrichello spun into retirement at Pouhon and clipped the armco barrier giving his Jordan 194 terminal suspension damage. Martin Brundle moved into fifth in the second McLaren, before he himself had spun off and clipped the armco like Barrichello by lap 25.

When Schumacher and Hill made their second pit stops on lap 28, Coulthard led a lap for the first time in his F1 career. After making his own second stop, he remained ahead of Hill until the Williams team called him in on lap 37 to check his rear wing. He then developed gearbox problems and was passed by Häkkinen, Verstappen and Mark Blundell in the Tyrrell. On lap 40, Coulthard hit the back of Blundell's car going through La Source; both were able to continue, with Coulthard apologising to Blundell afterwards. Eddie Irvine was the final retirement with the result of an alternator failure with only three laps to go and was classified fourteenth, leaving thirteen runners left in the race up to the finish.

Though Hill set the fastest lap of the race on lap 41, Schumacher crossed the finish line some 13 seconds ahead, with Häkkinen a further 51 seconds back and Verstappen, Coulthard, Blundell and Morbidelli completing the top six.

=== Post-race ===
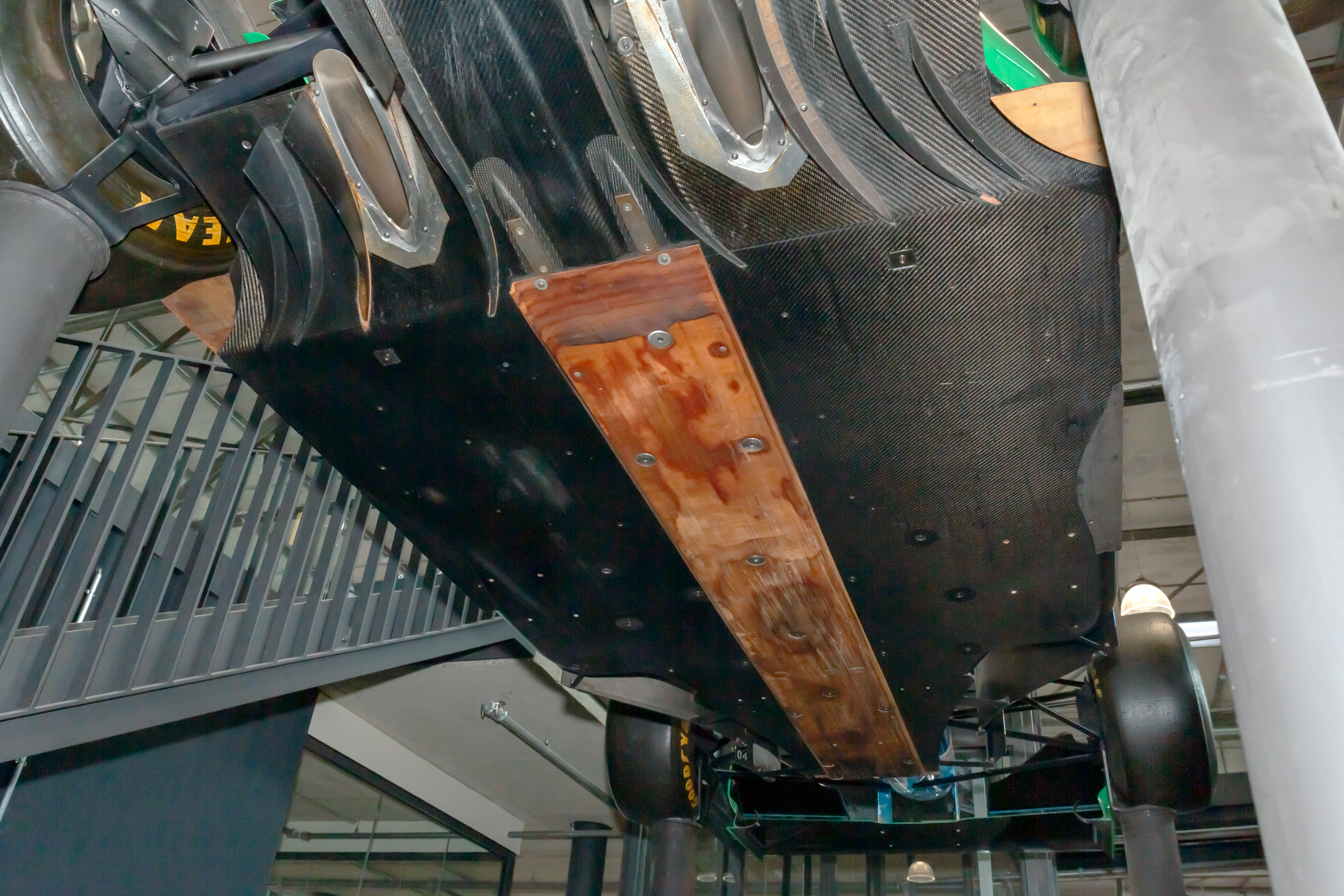
Bottom view of the Benetton B194.

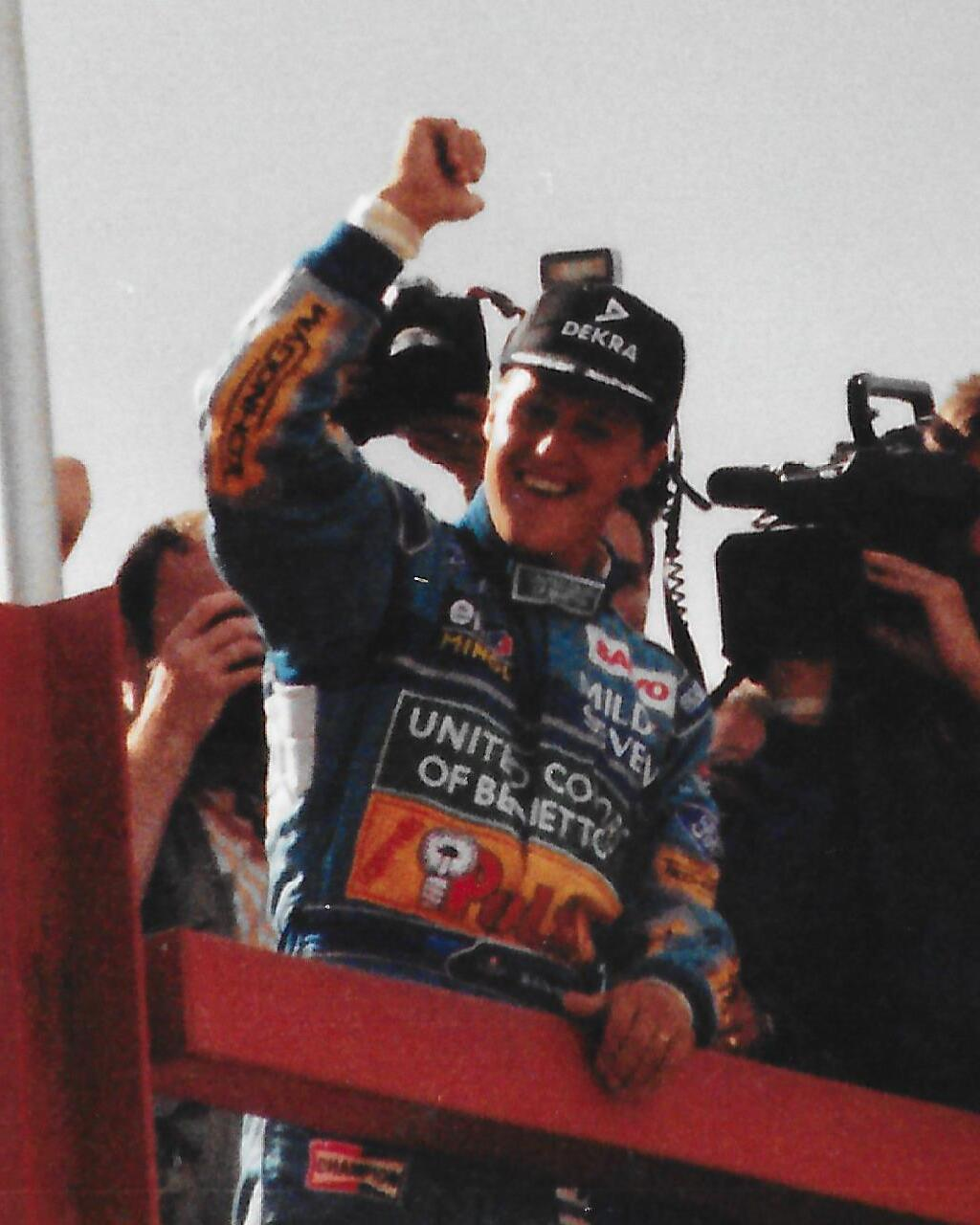
Michael Schumacher celebrating his race win before being disqualified.

Shortly after the race, excessive wear was found on the wooden skid block on the underside of Schumacher's car. The skid block was a mandatory requirement on all cars, introduced two races before in Germany, to increase ride height and reduce ground effect advantages. Wear on the skid block of up to one millimetre was permitted; any greater would make the ride height too low and result in an illegal aerodynamic advantage. The Benetton team claimed that the excessive wear resulted from Schumacher's spin on lap 19, but the stewards rejected the claim because of the wear pattern. Schumacher was thus disqualified and Hill awarded the victory, with Häkkinen second, Verstappen third, Coulthard fourth, Blundell fifth and Gianni Morbidelli sixth in the Footwork. Verstappen achieved his second and last podium in Formula One.

Schumacher's lead over Hill in the Drivers' Championship was reduced to 21 points with five races remaining.

== Classification ==
=== Qualifying ===
Pos	No	Driver	Constructor	Q1 Time	Q2 Time	Gap
1	14	(Brazil) Rubens Barrichello	Jordan-Hart	2:21.163	no time	
2	5	(Germany) Michael Schumacher	Benetton-Ford	2:21.494	2:25.501	+0.331
3	0	(United Kingdom) Damon Hill	Williams-Renault	2:21.681	2:25.570	+0.518
4	15	(United Kingdom) Eddie Irvine	Jordan-Hart	2:22.074	no time	+0.911
5	27	(France) Jean Alesi	Ferrari	2:22.202	2:25.099	+1.039
6	6	(Netherlands) Jos Verstappen	Benetton-Ford	2:22.218	2:28.576	+1.055
7	2	(United Kingdom) David Coulthard	Williams-Renault	2:22.359	2:27.180	+1.196
8	7	(Finland) Mika Häkkinen	McLaren-Peugeot	2:22.441	2:28.997	+1.278
9	30	(Germany) Heinz-Harald Frentzen	Sauber-Mercedes	2:22.634	2:28.026	+1.471
10	23	(Italy) Pierluigi Martini	Minardi-Ford	2:23.326	2:30.896	+2.163
11	28	(Austria) Gerhard Berger	Ferrari	2:23.895	2:29.391	+2.732
12	4	(United Kingdom) Mark Blundell	Tyrrell-Yamaha	2:24.048	2:28.164	+2.885
13	8	(United Kingdom) Martin Brundle	McLaren-Peugeot	2:24.117	2:28.428	+2.954
14	10	(Italy) Gianni Morbidelli	Footwork-Ford	2:25.114	2:31.403	+3.951
15	29	(Italy) Andrea de Cesaris	Sauber-Mercedes	2:25.695	2:30.475	+4.532
16	25	(France) Éric Bernard	Ligier-Renault	2:26.044	2:31.025	+4.881
17	26	(France) Olivier Panis	Ligier-Renault	2:26.079	2:31.501	+4.916
18	24	(Italy) Michele Alboreto	Minardi-Ford	2:26.738	2:32.286	+5.575
19	19	(France) Philippe Alliot	Larrousse-Ford	2:26.901	2:31.350	+5.738
20	12	(United Kingdom) Johnny Herbert	Lotus-Mugen-Honda	2:27.155	2:32.610	+5.992
21	31	(Australia) David Brabham	Simtek-Ford	2:27.212	2:41.593	+6.049
22	20	(France) Érik Comas	Larrousse-Ford	2:28.156	2:30.524	+6.993
23	3	(Japan) Ukyo Katayama	Tyrrell-Yamaha	2:28.979	2:29.925	+7.816
24	9	(Brazil) Christian Fittipaldi	Footwork-Ford	16:56.162	2:30.931	+9.768
25	32	(France) Jean-Marc Gounon	Simtek-Ford	2:31.755	2:40.280	+10.592
26	11	(Belgium) Philippe Adams	Lotus-Mugen-Honda	2:33.885	2:34.733	+12.722
DNQ	34	(France) Bertrand Gachot	Pacific-Ilmor	2:34.582	2:34.951	+13.419
DNQ	33	(France) Paul Belmondo	Pacific-Ilmor	2:35.729	no time	+14.566

=== Race ===
Pos	No	Driver	Constructor	Laps	Time/Retired	Grid	Points
1	0	(United Kingdom) Damon Hill	Williams-Renault	44	1:28:47.170	3	10
2	7	(Finland) Mika Häkkinen	McLaren-Peugeot	44	+ 51.381	8	6
3	6	(Netherlands) Jos Verstappen	Benetton-Ford	44	+ 1:10.453	6	4
4	2	(United Kingdom) David Coulthard	Williams-Renault	44	+ 1:45.787	7	3
5	4	(United Kingdom) Mark Blundell	Tyrrell-Yamaha	43	+ 1 Lap	12	2
6	10	(Italy) Gianni Morbidelli	Footwork-Ford	43	+ 1 Lap	14	1
7	26	(France) Olivier Panis	Ligier-Renault	43	+ 1 Lap	17	
8	23	(Italy) Pierluigi Martini	Minardi-Ford	43	+ 1 Lap	10	
9	24	(Italy) Michele Alboreto	Minardi-Ford	43	+ 1 Lap	18	
10	25	(France) Éric Bernard	Ligier-Renault	42	+ 2 Laps	16	
11	32	(France) Jean-Marc Gounon	Simtek-Ford	42	+ 2 Laps	25	
12	12	(United Kingdom) Johnny Herbert	Lotus-Mugen-Honda	41	+ 3 Laps	20	
13	15	(United Kingdom) Eddie Irvine	Jordan-Hart	40	Alternator	4	
Ret	9	(Brazil) Christian Fittipaldi	Footwork-Ford	33	Engine	24	
Ret	31	(Australia) David Brabham	Simtek-Ford	29	Wheel	21	
Ret	29	(Italy) Andrea de Cesaris	Sauber-Mercedes	27	Throttle	15	
Ret	8	(United Kingdom) Martin Brundle	McLaren-Peugeot	24	Spun off	13	
Ret	14	(Brazil) Rubens Barrichello	Jordan-Hart	19	Spun off	1	
Ret	3	(Japan) Ukyo Katayama	Tyrrell-Yamaha	18	Engine	23	
Ret	11	(Belgium) Philippe Adams	Lotus-Mugen-Honda	15	Spun off	26	
Ret	28	(Austria) Gerhard Berger	Ferrari	11	Engine	11	
Ret	19	(France) Philippe Alliot	Larrousse-Ford	11	Engine	19	
Ret	30	(Germany) Heinz-Harald Frentzen	Sauber-Mercedes	10	Halfshaft	9	
Ret	20	(France) Érik Comas	Larrousse-Ford	3	Engine	22	
Ret	27	(France) Jean Alesi	Ferrari	2	Engine	5	
DSQ	5	(Germany) Michael Schumacher	Benetton-Ford	44	Worn skid block	2	

== Championship standings after the race ==
Drivers' Championship standings

Pos	Driver	Points
1	(Germany) Michael Schumacher	76
2	(United Kingdom) Damon Hill	55
3	(Austria) Gerhard Berger	27
4	(France) Jean Alesi	19
5	(Finland) Mika Häkkinen	14

Constructors' Championship standings

Pos	Constructor	Points
1	(United Kingdom) Benetton-Ford	85
2	(United Kingdom) Williams-Renault	62
3	(Italy) Ferrari	52
4	(United Kingdom) McLaren-Peugeot	23
5	(Republic of Ireland) Jordan-Hart	14

Previous race: 1994 Hungarian Grand Prix	FIA Formula One World Championship; 1994 season	Next race: 1994 Italian Grand Prix
Previous race: 1993 Belgian Grand Prix	Belgian Grand Prix	Next race: 1995 Belgian Grand Prix
