= 1994 Italian Grand Prix =

- Race 12 of 16 in the 1994 Formula One World Championship
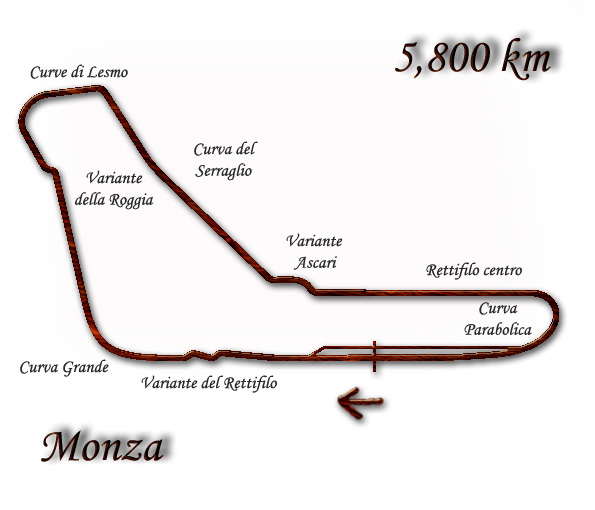

Race details
- Date: 11 September 1994
- Official name: Pioneer 65º Gran Premio d'Italia
- Location: Autodromo Nazionale di Monza; Monza, Lombardy, Italy
- Course: Permanent racing facility
- Course length: 5.834 km (3.625 miles)
- Distance: 53 laps, 309.202 km (192.125 miles)
- Weather: Sunny

Pole position
| Driver | (France) Jean Alesi | Ferrari |
- Time: 1:23.844

Fastest lap
| Driver | (United Kingdom) Damon Hill | Williams-Renault |
- Time: 1:25.930 on lap 24

Podium
| First | (United Kingdom) Damon Hill | Williams-Renault |
| Second | (Austria) Gerhard Berger | Ferrari |
| Third | (Finland) Mika Häkkinen | McLaren-Peugeot |

The 1994 Italian Grand Prix (formally the Pioneer 65º Gran Premio d'Italia) was a Formula One motor race held on 11 September 1994 at the Autodromo Nazionale di Monza, Monza. It was the twelfth race of the 1994 Formula One World Championship.

The 53-lap race was won by British driver Damon Hill, driving a Williams-Renault, with Austria's Gerhard Berger second in a Ferrari and Finland's Mika Häkkinen third in a McLaren-Peugeot. Frenchman Jean Alesi took pole position in the other Ferrari and led before suffering a gearbox failure on lap 15.

The win enabled Hill to move to within 11 points of Michael Schumacher in the Drivers' Championship. Schumacher was banned for this race and the following race in Portugal for his actions at the British Grand Prix; his place at Benetton was taken by the Finnish driver JJ Lehto, who had been his teammate earlier in the season.

The day after the race, Lotus went into receivership; however, they would compete in the remaining races of the 1994 season. Lotus had brought an upgraded Mugen engine to Monza, allowing Johnny Herbert to qualify in a season-best fourth place; hopes of a points finish were ended by a first-corner collision with Eddie Irvine's Jordan.

== Background ==
The Grand Prix was originally cancelled on 12 August 1994 when local officials refused a demand to cut down 123 trees for reasons related to safety. The trees in question were located at the Lesmo corners which lacked suitable run off-areas. After the announcement, Gianni Letta, an Italian cabinet under-secretary, went to Cannes to meet with FIA president Max Mosley to discuss the issue. The meeting, also attended by Ferrari driver and representative to the drivers Gerhard Berger, agreed that changes to the shape of the curve would reduce its speed.

== Qualifying ==
=== Qualifying report ===
To the delight of the Tifosi, Jean Alesi took pole position in his Ferrari with teammate Berger second, some 0.134 seconds behind. It was the first pole position for Ferrari at Monza since Mario Andretti in 1982, and the first all-Ferrari front row at the circuit since Niki Lauda and Clay Regazzoni in 1975. Damon Hill was third in his Williams-Renault, with Johnny Herbert a surprise fourth in the Lotus, running an upgraded Mugen engine. David Coulthard was fifth in the other Williams, with Olivier Panis sixth in the Ligier. The top ten was completed by Mika Häkkinen in the McLaren, Andrea de Cesaris in the Sauber, Eddie Irvine in the Jordan and Jos Verstappen in the Benetton.

=== Qualifying classification ===
| Pos | No | Driver | Constructor | Q1 | Q2 | Gap |
|---|---|---|---|---|---|---|
| 1 | 27 | (France) Jean Alesi | Ferrari | 1:24.620 | 1:23.844 | |
| 2 | 28 | (Austria) Gerhard Berger | Ferrari | 1:24.915 | 1:23.978 | +0.134 |
| 3 | 0 | (United Kingdom) Damon Hill | Williams-Renault | 1:24.734 | 1:24.158 | +0.314 |
| 4 | 12 | (United Kingdom) Johnny Herbert | Lotus-Mugen-Honda | 1:26.365 | 1:24.374 | +0.530 |
| 5 | 2 | (United Kingdom) David Coulthard | Williams-Renault | 1:24.869 | 1:24.502 | +0.658 |
| 6 | 26 | (France) Olivier Panis | Ligier-Renault | 1:26.958 | 1:25.455 | +1.611 |
| 7 | 7 | (Finland) Mika Häkkinen | McLaren-Peugeot | 1:26.004 | 1:25.528 | +1.684 |
| 8 | 29 | (Italy) Andrea de Cesaris | Sauber-Mercedes | 1:27.188 | 1:25.540 | +1.696 |
| 9 | 15 | (United Kingdom) Eddie Irvine | Jordan-Hart | No time | 1:25.568 | +1.724 |
| 10 | 6 | (Netherlands) Jos Verstappen | Benetton-Ford | 1:27.361 | 1:25.618 | +1.774 |
| 11 | 30 | (Germany) Heinz-Harald Frentzen | Sauber-Mercedes | 1:26.406 | 1:25.628 | +1.784 |
| 12 | 25 | (France) Éric Bernard | Ligier-Renault | 1:27.387 | 1:25.718 | +1.874 |
| 13 | 11 | (Italy) Alessandro Zanardi | Lotus-Mugen-Honda | 1:27.617 | 1:25.733 | +1.889 |
| 14 | 3 | (Japan) Ukyo Katayama | Tyrrell-Yamaha | 1:26.525 | 1:25.889 | +2.045 |
| 15 | 8 | (United Kingdom) Martin Brundle | McLaren-Peugeot | 1:26.899 | 1:25.933 | +2.089 |
| 16 | 14 | (Brazil) Rubens Barrichello | Jordan-Hart | 1:27.034 | 1:25.946 | +2.102 |
| 17 | 10 | (Italy) Gianni Morbidelli | Footwork-Ford | 1:27.939 | 1:26.002 | +2.158 |
| 18 | 23 | (Italy) Pierluigi Martini | Minardi-Ford | 1:42.320 | 1:26.056 | +2.212 |
| 19 | 9 | (Brazil) Christian Fittipaldi | Footwork-Ford | 1:27.675 | 1:26.337 | +2.493 |
| 20 | 5 | (Finland) JJ Lehto | Benetton-Ford | 1:27.611 | 1:26.384 | +2.540 |
| 21 | 4 | (United Kingdom) Mark Blundell | Tyrrell-Yamaha | 1:26.574 | 1:26.697 | +2.730 |
| 22 | 24 | (Italy) Michele Alboreto | Minardi-Ford | 1:27.623 | 1:26.832 | +2.988 |
| 23 | 19 | (France) Yannick Dalmas | Larrousse-Ford | 1:29.528 | 1:27.846 | +4.002 |
| 24 | 20 | (France) Érik Comas | Larrousse-Ford | 1:30.530 | 1:27.894 | +4.050 |
| 25 | 32 | (France) Jean-Marc Gounon | Simtek-Ford | 1:29.594 | 1:28.353 | +4.509 |
| 26 | 31 | (Australia) David Brabham | Simtek-Ford | 1:30.691 | 1:28.619 | +4.775 |
| DNQ | 34 | (France) Bertrand Gachot | Pacific-Ilmor | 1:31.549 | 1:31.387 | +7.543 |
| DNQ | 33 | (France) Paul Belmondo | Pacific-Ilmor | 1:32.035 | No time | +8.191 |
Sources:

- ^1 Eddie Irvine's Friday qualifying times were deleted because he completed 13 laps, one over the limit, during the session.
- ^2 Paul Belmondo did not take part in the Saturday qualifying session after destroying his car in a crash in the morning's practice session.

== Race ==
=== Race report ===
Alesi and Berger got off the line well heading into turn 1, with Herbert moving ahead of Hill into third. Behind them, the fast-starting Irvine locked up, causing him to hit Herbert. The Lotus was pitched into a spin, clipping Coulthard's right rear. Several other cars became involved, blocking the track and stopping the race. Herbert was forced to take the second start from the pit lane in his spare car, minus the upgraded Mugen engine, while Coulthard was forced to use Hill's spare car and Irvine was demoted to the back of the grid.

At the second start, both Ferraris again got away well, followed by Hill and Coulthard. Behind them, Verstappen tangled with Alessandro Zanardi in the second Lotus going into the Curva Grande, also forcing Gianni Morbidelli's Footwork into the outer wall and putting all three drivers out. Herbert's race ended on lap 14 when his alternator failed. On lap 15, Alesi came in for his first pit stop with an 11-second lead over Berger; disaster then struck as his tried to exit his pit box and his gearbox failed. Berger inherited the lead until lap 24, when he too ran into trouble during his pit stop: he was about to pull away when the incoming Panis came past, costing him enough time to drop behind Hill and Coulthard and prompting the Tifosi to jeer the Ligier mechanics.

A high attrition rate continued to build: the Saubers of de Cesaris and Heinz-Harald Frentzen suffered engine failures on laps 21 and 23 respectively, while the Minardis also retired within two laps of each other, Michele Alboreto's gearbox failing on lap 29 and Pierluigi Martini spinning off at the Variante Ascari on lap 31. Mark Blundell also spun out at the Variante Ascari in his Tyrrell on lap 40, before Irvine's engine failed on lap 42. Ukyo Katayama took advantage to run fifth in the second Tyrrell, only to himself spin off on lap 46 at the second Lesmo corner. After David Brabham dropped out with a puncture in his Simtek on lap 47, only ten cars remained in the race.

In the closing laps, Hill maintained a narrow lead over Coulthard, while the recovering Berger closed on both Williams. Then, rounding the Parabolica on the final lap, Coulthard suddenly coasted to a stop, out of fuel. Hill was thus left to win by 4.9 seconds from Berger, with Häkkinen taking the final podium place, a further 21 seconds back. Rubens Barrichello took fourth in the second Jordan and Martin Brundle fifth in the second McLaren, with Coulthard classified sixth.

=== Race classification ===
| Pos | No | Driver | Constructor | Laps | Time/Retired | Grid | Points |
|---|---|---|---|---|---|---|---|
| 1 | 0 | (United Kingdom) Damon Hill | Williams-Renault | 53 | 1:18:02.754 | 3 | 10 |
| 2 | 28 | (Austria) Gerhard Berger | Ferrari | 53 | + 4.930 | 2 | 6 |
| 3 | 7 | (Finland) Mika Häkkinen | McLaren-Peugeot | 53 | + 25.640 | 7 | 4 |
| 4 | 14 | (Brazil) Rubens Barrichello | Jordan-Hart | 53 | + 50.634 | 16 | 3 |
| 5 | 8 | (United Kingdom) Martin Brundle | McLaren-Peugeot | 53 | + 1:25.575 | 15 | 2 |
| 6 | 2 | (United Kingdom) David Coulthard | Williams-Renault | 52 | Out of fuel | 5 | 1 |
| 7 | 25 | (France) Éric Bernard | Ligier-Renault | 52 | + 1 lap | 12 | |
| 8 | 20 | (France) Érik Comas | Larrousse-Ford | 52 | + 1 lap | 24 | |
| 9 | 5 | (Finland) JJ Lehto | Benetton-Ford | 52 | + 1 lap | 20 | |
| 10 | 26 | (France) Olivier Panis | Ligier-Renault | 51 | + 2 laps | 6 | |
| Ret | 31 | (Australia) David Brabham | Simtek-Ford | 46 | Puncture | 26 | |
| Ret | 3 | (Japan) Ukyo Katayama | Tyrrell-Yamaha | 45 | Spun off | 14 | |
| Ret | 9 | (Brazil) Christian Fittipaldi | Footwork-Ford | 43 | Engine | 19 | |
| Ret | 15 | (United Kingdom) Eddie Irvine | Jordan-Hart | 41 | Engine | 9 | |
| Ret | 4 | (United Kingdom) Mark Blundell | Tyrrell-Yamaha | 39 | Spun off | 21 | |
| Ret | 23 | (Italy) Pierluigi Martini | Minardi-Ford | 30 | Spun off | 18 | |
| Ret | 24 | (Italy) Michele Alboreto | Minardi-Ford | 28 | Gearbox | 22 | |
| Ret | 30 | (Germany) Heinz-Harald Frentzen | Sauber-Mercedes | 22 | Engine | 11 | |
| Ret | 29 | (Italy) Andrea de Cesaris | Sauber-Mercedes | 20 | Engine | 8 | |
| Ret | 32 | (France) Jean-Marc Gounon | Simtek-Ford | 20 | Gearbox | 25 | |
| Ret | 19 | (France) Yannick Dalmas | Larrousse-Ford | 18 | Spun off | 23 | |
| Ret | 27 | (France) Jean Alesi | Ferrari | 14 | Gearbox | 1 | |
| Ret | 12 | (United Kingdom) Johnny Herbert | Lotus-Mugen-Honda | 13 | Alternator | 4 | |
| Ret | 6 | (Netherlands) Jos Verstappen | Benetton-Ford | 0 | Puncture | 10 | |
| Ret | 11 | (Italy) Alessandro Zanardi | Lotus-Mugen-Honda | 0 | Collision | 13 | |
| Ret | 10 | (Italy) Gianni Morbidelli | Footwork-Ford | 0 | Collision | 17 | |

== Championship standings after the race ==
Drivers' Championship standings

| Pos | Driver | Points |
|---|---|---|
| 1 | (Germany) Michael Schumacher | 76 |
| 2 | (United Kingdom) Damon Hill | 65 |
| 3 | (Austria) Gerhard Berger | 33 |
| 4 | (France) Jean Alesi | 19 |
| 5 | (Finland) Mika Häkkinen | 18 |

Constructors' Championship standings

| Pos | Constructor | Points |
|---|---|---|
| 1 | (United Kingdom) Benetton-Ford | 85 |
| 2 | (United Kingdom) Williams-Renault | 73 |
| 3 | (Italy) Ferrari | 58 |
| 4 | (United Kingdom) McLaren-Peugeot | 29 |
| 5 | (Republic of Ireland) Jordan-Hart | 17 |

| Previous race: 1994 Belgian Grand Prix | FIA Formula One World Championship; 1994 season | Next race: 1994 Portuguese Grand Prix |
| Previous race: 1993 Italian Grand Prix | Italian Grand Prix | Next race: 1995 Italian Grand Prix |
