= 1994 Japanese Grand Prix =

- Race 15 of 16 in the 1994 Formula One World Championship

Race details
- Date: 6 November 1994
- Official name: XX Fuji Television Japanese Grand Prix
- Location: Suzuka Circuit; Suzuka, Mie, Japan
- Course: Permanent racing facility
- Course length: 5.860 km (3.641 miles)
- Distance: 50 laps, 293.000 km (182.062 miles)
- Scheduled distance: 53 laps, 310.580 km (192.985 miles)
- Weather: Heavy rain, followed by light showers
- Attendance: 357,000

Pole position
Driver	(Germany) Michael Schumacher	Benetton-Ford
- Time: 1:37.209

Fastest lap
Driver	(United Kingdom) Damon Hill	Williams-Renault
- Time: 1:56.597 on lap 24

Podium
First	(United Kingdom) Damon Hill	Williams-Renault
Second	(Germany) Michael Schumacher	Benetton-Ford
Third	(France) Jean Alesi	Ferrari

The 1994 Japanese Grand Prix (officially the XX Fuji Television Japanese Grand Prix) was a Formula One motor race held on 6 November 1994 at the Suzuka Circuit, Suzuka. It was the fifteenth and penultimate race of the 1994 Formula One World Championship. In wet conditions, the 50-lap race was won by Damon Hill, driving a Williams-Renault, after he started from second position. Hill's Drivers' Championship rival Michael Schumacher finished second in his Benetton-Ford, having started from pole position, with Jean Alesi third in his Ferrari. The win left Hill just one point behind Schumacher in the Drivers' Championship with one race remaining. This also proved to be the last Grand Prix for Érik Comas. This was also the last time in Formula 1 history when the race was split in two parts due to race stoppage and final classification has been set by aggregate time.

== Report ==
Going into the race, Benetton driver Michael Schumacher led the Drivers' Championship with 86 points, five ahead of rival Damon Hill in the Williams on 81. Schumacher felt he was "very confident" about the race, and Hill similarly declared that he was "positive".

There were several changes of driver for this race: Johnny Herbert moved from Ligier to Benetton after just one race for the French team, replacing Jos Verstappen. His place at Ligier was taken by Franck Lagorce. Eric Bernard lost his seat at Lotus to Mika Salo who had been racing in Japanese Formula 3000, and likewise Simtek hired Taki Inoue on a one-race deal, replacing Domenico Schiattarella. Finally, JJ Lehto returned to Sauber to replace Andrea de Cesaris after the Italian's sudden retirement from Formula One.

The race started in torrential rain, and as a result, several cars spun out of the race by aquaplaning, including Schumacher's team-mate Herbert on lap 4, Lagorce, the Minardis of Pierluigi Martini and Michele Alboreto, and all three Japanese drivers by the end of lap 3 (with Ukyo Katayama and Inoue being injured in separate crashes). Lehto also retired at the start with an engine failure. Hideki Noda's electrics failed on lap 1, as did Gerhard Berger's Ferrari with by lap 11.

On lap 13, Gianni Morbidelli crashed his Footwork at one of the Esses at the first sector. Shortly afterwards, Martin Brundle spun his McLaren off the track and crashed at the same spot, and as he bounced off the tyre barriers, hit a track marshal who was moving Morbidelli's car off the gravel trap. The marshal suffered a broken leg, adding to the huge list of injuries of the 1994 season, and the race was immediately stopped, as both Brundle and Morbidelli were fortunately able to escape uninjured. Rubens Barrichello soon retired in the pits with transmission problems by lap 17, Blundell was also forced to retire from 10th position when his engine failed on lap 27, which ended an appalling weekend for Tyrrell. This left 13 runners, and there were no further retirements for the remaining 23 laps.

As the rain eased, it was decided to run the remainder of the race, with around one hour to the time limit, on aggregate corrected time. Schumacher had been leading by 6.8 seconds when the red flag was shown, but Hill had a bigger lead (10.1 seconds) at the chequered flag, and thus took the win by 3.3 seconds on aggregate. This remains the last instance of aggregate race time being used in Formula One to determine the winner.

Hill subsequently stated that his driving was "on a different level from how I'd ever driven before", noting that he never would achieve that level of performance again in his career.

== Classification ==
=== Qualifying ===
Pos	No	Driver	Constructor	Q1 Time	Q2 Time	Gap
1	5	(Germany) Michael Schumacher	Benetton-Ford	1:37.209	1:57.128	
2	0	(United Kingdom) Damon Hill	Williams-Renault	1:37.696	1:57.278	+0.487
3	30	(Germany) Heinz-Harald Frentzen	Sauber-Mercedes	1:37.742	1:56.935	+0.533
4	2	(United Kingdom) Nigel Mansell	Williams-Renault	1:37.768	2:00.963	+0.559
5	6	(United Kingdom) Johnny Herbert	Benetton-Ford	1:37.828	1:59.729	+0.619
6	15	(United Kingdom) Eddie Irvine	Jordan-Hart	1:37.880	1:57.760	+0.671
7	27	(France) Jean Alesi	Ferrari	1:37.907	1:58.610	+0.698
8	7	(Finland) Mika Häkkinen	McLaren-Peugeot	1:37.998	1:58.204	+0.789
9	8	(United Kingdom) Martin Brundle	McLaren-Peugeot	1:38.076	1:56.876	+0.877
10	14	(Brazil) Rubens Barrichello	Jordan-Hart	1:38.533	2:01.905	+1.324
11	28	(Austria) Gerhard Berger	Ferrari	1:38.570	1:58.926	+1.361
12	10	(Italy) Gianni Morbidelli	Footwork-Ford	1:39.030	2:07.293	+1.821
13	4	(United Kingdom) Mark Blundell	Tyrrell-Yamaha	1:39.266	2:02.266	+2.057
14	3	(Japan) Ukyo Katayama	Tyrrell-Yamaha	1:39.462	2:04.187	+2.253
15	29	(Finland) JJ Lehto	Sauber-Mercedes	1:39.483	1:59.943	+2.274
16	23	(Italy) Pierluigi Martini	Minardi-Ford	1:39.548	2:01.929	+2.339
17	12	(Italy) Alessandro Zanardi	Lotus-Mugen-Honda	1:39.721	2:02.077	+2.512
18	9	(Brazil) Christian Fittipaldi	Footwork-Ford	1:39.868	2:00.084	+2.659
19	26	(France) Olivier Panis	Ligier-Renault	1:40.042	2:00.575	+2.833
20	25	(France) Franck Lagorce	Ligier-Renault	1:40.577	2:02.780	+3.368
21	24	(Italy) Michele Alboreto	Minardi-Ford	1:40.652	2:02.219	+3.443
22	20	(France) Érik Comas	Larrousse-Ford	1:40.978	2:01.035	+3.769
23	19	(Japan) Hideki Noda	Larrousse-Ford	1:40.990	2:05.354	+3.781
24	31	(Australia) David Brabham	Simtek-Ford	1:41.659	2:09.453	+4.450
25	11	(Finland) Mika Salo	Lotus-Mugen-Honda	1:41.805	2:01.637	+4.596
26	32	(Japan) Taki Inoue	Simtek-Ford	1:45.004	no time	+7.795
DNQ	34	(France) Bertrand Gachot	Pacific-Ilmor	1:46.374	no time	+9.165
DNQ	33	(France) Paul Belmondo	Pacific-Ilmor	1:46.629	no time	+9.420

=== Race ===
Pos	No	Driver	Constructor	Laps	Time/Retired	Grid	Points
1	0	(United Kingdom) Damon Hill	Williams-Renault	50	1:55:53.532	2	10
2	5	(Germany) Michael Schumacher	Benetton-Ford	50	+ 3.365	1	6
3	27	(France) Jean Alesi	Ferrari	50	+ 52.045	7	4
4	2	(United Kingdom) Nigel Mansell	Williams-Renault	50	+ 56.074	4	3
5	15	(United Kingdom) Eddie Irvine	Jordan-Hart	50	+ 1:42.107	6	2
6	30	(Germany) Heinz-Harald Frentzen	Sauber-Mercedes	50	+ 1:59.863	3	1
7	7	(Finland) Mika Häkkinen	McLaren-Peugeot	50	+ 2:02.985	8	
8	9	(Brazil) Christian Fittipaldi	Footwork-Ford	49	+ 1 Lap	18	
9	20	(France) Érik Comas	Larrousse-Ford	49	+ 1 Lap	22	
10	11	(Finland) Mika Salo	Lotus-Mugen-Honda	49	+ 1 Lap	25	
11	26	(France) Olivier Panis	Ligier-Renault	49	+ 1 Lap	19	
12	31	(Australia) David Brabham	Simtek-Ford	48	+ 2 Laps	24	
13	12	(Italy) Alessandro Zanardi	Lotus-Mugen-Honda	48	+ 2 Laps	17	
Ret	4	(United Kingdom) Mark Blundell	Tyrrell-Yamaha	26	Engine	13	
Ret	14	(Brazil) Rubens Barrichello	Jordan-Hart	16	Gearbox	10	
Ret	8	(United Kingdom) Martin Brundle	McLaren-Peugeot	13	Spun Off	9	
Ret	10	(Italy) Gianni Morbidelli	Footwork-Ford	13	Spun Off	12	
Ret	28	(Austria) Gerhard Berger	Ferrari	10	Battery	11	
Ret	25	(France) Franck Lagorce	Ligier-Renault	10	Collision	20	
Ret	23	(Italy) Pierluigi Martini	Minardi-Ford	10	Collision	16	
Ret	24	(Italy) Michele Alboreto	Minardi-Ford	10	Spun Off	21	
Ret	6	(United Kingdom) Johnny Herbert	Benetton-Ford	3	Spun Off	5	
Ret	3	(Japan) Ukyo Katayama	Tyrrell-Yamaha	3	Spun Off	14	
Ret	32	(Japan) Taki Inoue	Simtek-Ford	3	Spun Off	26	
Ret	29	(Finland) JJ Lehto	Sauber-Mercedes	0	Engine	15	
Ret	19	(Japan) Hideki Noda	Larrousse-Ford	0	Electrics	PL	

== Championship standings after the race ==
Drivers' Championship standings

Pos	Driver	Points
1	(Germany) Michael Schumacher	92
2	(United Kingdom) Damon Hill	91
3	(Austria) Gerhard Berger	35
4	(Finland) Mika Häkkinen	26
5	(France) Jean Alesi	23

Constructors' Championship standings

Pos	Constructor	Points
1	(United Kingdom) Williams-Renault	108
2	(United Kingdom) Benetton-Ford	103
3	(Italy) Ferrari	64
4	(United Kingdom) McLaren-Peugeot	38
5	(Republic of Ireland) Jordan-Hart	25

Previous race: 1994 European Grand Prix	FIA Formula One World Championship; 1994 season	Next race: 1994 Australian Grand Prix
Previous race: 1993 Japanese Grand Prix	Japanese Grand Prix	Next race: 1995 Japanese Grand Prix
