= 1994 Brazilian Grand Prix =

- Race 1 of 16 in the 1994 Formula One World Championship
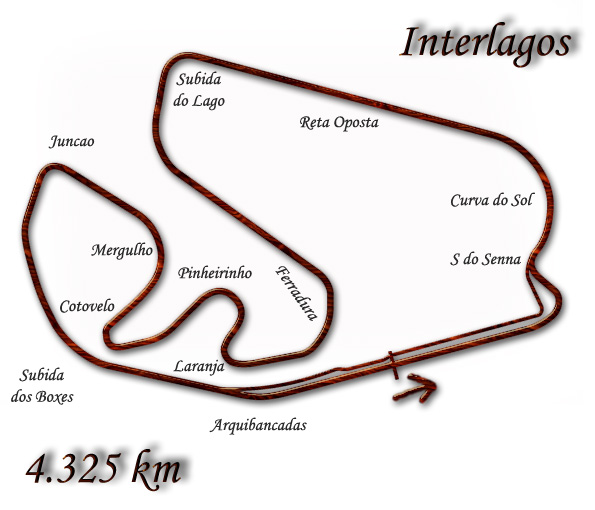

Race details
- Date: 27 March 1994
- Official name: XXIII Grande Prêmio do Brasil
- Location: Autódromo José Carlos Pace; São Paulo, Brazil
- Course: Permanent racing facility
- Course length: 4.325 km (2.687 miles)
- Distance: 71 laps, 307.075 km (190.808 miles)
- Weather: Sunny

Pole position
Driver	(Brazil) Ayrton Senna	Williams-Renault
- Time: 1:15.962

Fastest lap
Driver	(Germany) Michael Schumacher	Benetton-Ford
- Time: 1:18.455 on lap 7

Podium
First	(Germany) Michael Schumacher	Benetton-Ford
Second	(United Kingdom) Damon Hill	Williams-Renault
Third	(France) Jean Alesi	Ferrari

The 1994 Brazilian Grand Prix (formally the XXIII Grande Prêmio do Brasil) was a Formula One motor race held on 27 March 1994 at the Autódromo José Carlos Pace, São Paulo. It was the first race of the 1994 Formula One World Championship.

The 71-lap race was won by German driver Michael Schumacher, driving a Benetton-Ford, after starting from second position. Local hero Ayrton Senna took pole position in his Williams-Renault and led before being overtaken by Schumacher at the first round of pit stops, after which he spun off. Senna's British teammate Damon Hill finished second, with Frenchman Jean Alesi third in a Ferrari.

== Background ==
The first race of the 1994 season saw five drivers made their F1 debuts: Heinz-Harald Frentzen, Olivier Panis, Jos Verstappen, Olivier Beretta and Roland Ratzenberger. There were also two new teams: Simtek, who had previously been involved in F1 as the designers of the Andrea Moda S921 in 1992, and Pacific Racing, who had enjoyed much success in lower formulae. This race also was first Grand Prix since 1983 to permit refuelling during in-race pit stops.

== Qualifying report ==
In his first race for Williams, Ayrton Senna took pole position by 0.3 of a second from Michael Schumacher's Benetton. Jean Alesi was third in his Ferrari, over a second behind Schumacher, with Damon Hill fourth in the other Williams. Frentzen impressed by taking fifth in his Sauber, with Gianni Morbidelli – back in F1 after contesting the 1993 Italian Superturismo Championship – taking sixth in his Footwork. The top ten was completed by Karl Wendlinger in the second Sauber, Mika Häkkinen in the McLaren, Verstappen in the second Benetton and Ukyo Katayama in the Tyrrell. Of the two new teams, Bertrand Gachot qualified 25th in his Pacific and David Brabham 26th in his Simtek, with their respective teammates Paul Belmondo and Ratzenberger failing to qualify.

=== Qualifying classification ===
Pos	No	Driver	Constructor	Q1	Q2	Gap
1	2	(Brazil) Ayrton Senna	Williams-Renault	1:16.386	1:15.962	—
2	5	(Germany) Michael Schumacher	Benetton-Ford	1:16.575	1:16.290	+0.328
3	27	(France) Jean Alesi	Ferrari	1:17.772	1:17.385	+1.423
4	0	(United Kingdom) Damon Hill	Williams-Renault	1:18.270	1:17.554	+1.592
5	30	(Germany) Heinz-Harald Frentzen	Sauber-Mercedes	1:18.144	1:17.806	+1.844
6	10	(Italy) Gianni Morbidelli	Footwork-Ford	1:18.970	1:17.866	+1.904
7	29	(Austria) Karl Wendlinger	Sauber-Mercedes	1:17.982	1:17.927	+1.965
8	7	(Finland) Mika Häkkinen	McLaren-Peugeot	1:18.122	1:19.576	+2.160
9	6	(Netherlands) Jos Verstappen	Benetton-Ford	1:18.787	1:18.183	+2.221
10	3	(Japan) Ukyo Katayama	Tyrrell-Yamaha	1:19.519	1:18.194	+2.232
11	9	(Brazil) Christian Fittipaldi	Footwork-Ford	1:18.730	1:18.204	+2.242
12	4	(United Kingdom) Mark Blundell	Tyrrell-Yamaha	1:19.045	1:18.246	+2.284
13	20	(France) Érik Comas	Larrousse-Ford	1:18.990	1:18.321	+2.359
14	14	(Brazil) Rubens Barrichello	Jordan-Hart	1:18.759	1:18.414	+2.452
15	23	(Italy) Pierluigi Martini	Minardi-Ford	1:18.659	no time	+2.697
16	15	(United Kingdom) Eddie Irvine	Jordan-Hart	1:19.269	1:18.751	+2.789
17	28	(Austria) Gerhard Berger	Ferrari	1:18.931	1:18.855	+2.893
18	8	(United Kingdom) Martin Brundle	McLaren-Peugeot	1:18.864	13:18.601	+2.902
19	26	(France) Olivier Panis	Ligier-Renault	1:19.304	1:19.533	+3.342
20	25	(France) Éric Bernard	Ligier-Renault	1:19.396	1:19.633	+3.434
21	12	(United Kingdom) Johnny Herbert	Lotus-Mugen-Honda	1:19.798	1:19.483	+3.521
22	24	(Italy) Michele Alboreto	Minardi-Ford	1:19.517	no time	+3.555
23	19	(Monaco) Olivier Beretta	Larrousse-Ford	1:19.922	1:19.524	+3.562
24	11	(Portugal) Pedro Lamy	Lotus-Mugen-Honda	1:21.029	1:19.975	+4.013
25	34	(France) Bertrand Gachot	Pacific-Ilmor	1:22.495	1:20.729	+4.767
26	31	(Australia) David Brabham	Simtek-Ford	1:22.266	1:21.186	+5.224
DNQ	32	(Austria) Roland Ratzenberger	Simtek-Ford	1:22.707	1:23.109	+6.745
DNQ	33	(France) Paul Belmondo	Pacific-Ilmor	no time	no time	—

== Race report ==
At the start Senna led from pole position, while Alesi overtook Schumacher. Schumacher retook second place on lap 2 and started chasing after Senna, who had pulled a four-second lead in the opening laps. Before the pit stops Schumacher had reduced the gap to just over a second, and on lap 21 the leading pair entered the pit lane together. Despite both teams running the same fuel strategy, Schumacher's stop was faster than Senna's, and thus he took the lead.

On lap 35, there was a four-car pile-up as Eddie Irvine and Verstappen came up to lap the Ligier of Éric Bernard. All three were rapidly closing up on Martin Brundle's McLaren which had suffered an engine failure. Faced with the prospect of colliding with the McLaren, Irvine jinked left as Verstappen attempted an overtake on that side thus forcing Verstappen on to the grass; Verstappen then lost control of his car and somersaulted over the McLaren whilst Bernard took avoiding action to the right. Brundle's helmet was impacted by the airborne Benetton although he escaped serious injury. Irvine was subsequently sanctioned by the FIA with a one-race ban, which was increased to three after the appeal of Jordan failed; Irvine was already under investigation due to an incident with Senna in Suzuka the year before.

Schumacher increased his lead to 10 seconds after the second round of pit stops, after which Senna started to close. By lap 55 the pair had lapped third-place runner Hill and the gap was down to 5 seconds, but then Senna lost control of his Williams and retired, However, even though he retired from the race in Brazil, he finished in 13th place because he was the last driver to retired and had completed more laps than the other drivers who had retired earlier. After Senna's retirement Schumacher won comfortably, a lap ahead of Hill in second place and Alesi finishing third. Rubens Barrichello, Katayama and Wendlinger completed the top six, Katayama scoring his first points.

=== Race classification ===
Pos	No	Driver	Constructor	Laps	Time/Retired	Grid	Points
1	5	(Germany) Michael Schumacher	Benetton-Ford	71	1:35:38.759	2	10
2	0	(United Kingdom) Damon Hill	Williams-Renault	70	+ 1 lap	4	6
3	27	(France) Jean Alesi	Ferrari	70	+ 1 lap	3	4
4	14	(Brazil) Rubens Barrichello	Jordan-Hart	70	+ 1 lap	14	3
5	3	(Japan) Ukyo Katayama	Tyrrell-Yamaha	69	+ 2 laps	10	2
6	29	(Austria) Karl Wendlinger	Sauber-Mercedes	69	+ 2 laps	7	1
7	12	(United Kingdom) Johnny Herbert	Lotus-Mugen-Honda	69	+ 2 laps	21	
8	23	(Italy) Pierluigi Martini	Minardi-Ford	69	+ 2 laps	15	
9	20	(France) Érik Comas	Larrousse-Ford	68	+ 3 laps	13	
10	11	(Portugal) Pedro Lamy	Lotus-Mugen-Honda	68	+ 3 laps	24	
11	26	(France) Olivier Panis	Ligier-Renault	68	+ 3 laps	19	
12	31	(Australia) David Brabham	Simtek-Ford	67	+ 4 laps	26	
Ret	2	(Brazil) Ayrton Senna	Williams-Renault	55	Spun off	1	
Ret	8	(United Kingdom) Martin Brundle	McLaren-Peugeot	34	Collision	18	
Ret	15	(United Kingdom) Eddie Irvine	Jordan-Hart	34	Collision	16	
Ret	6	(Netherlands) Jos Verstappen	Benetton-Ford	34	Collision	9	
Ret	25	(France) Éric Bernard	Ligier-Renault	33	Collision	20	
Ret	4	(United Kingdom) Mark Blundell	Tyrrell-Yamaha	21	Spun off	12	
Ret	9	(Brazil) Christian Fittipaldi	Footwork-Ford	21	Gearbox	11	
Ret	30	(Germany) Heinz-Harald Frentzen	Sauber-Mercedes	15	Spun off	5	
Ret	7	(Finland) Mika Häkkinen	McLaren-Peugeot	13	Engine	8	
Ret	24	(Italy) Michele Alboreto	Minardi-Ford	7	Engine	22	
Ret	10	(Italy) Gianni Morbidelli	Footwork-Ford	5	Gearbox	6	
Ret	28	(Austria) Gerhard Berger	Ferrari	5	Engine	17	
Ret	19	(Monaco) Olivier Beretta	Larrousse-Ford	2	Collision	23	
Ret	34	(France) Bertrand Gachot	Pacific-Ilmor	1	Collision	25	

== Championship standings after the race ==
Drivers' Championship standings

Pos	Driver	Points
1	(Germany) Michael Schumacher	10
2	(United Kingdom) Damon Hill	6
3	(France) Jean Alesi	4
4	(Brazil) Rubens Barrichello	3
5	(Japan) Ukyo Katayama	2

Constructors' Championship standings

Pos	Constructor	Points
1	(United Kingdom) Benetton-Ford	10
2	(United Kingdom) Williams-Renault	6
3	(Italy) Ferrari	4
4	(Republic of Ireland) Jordan-Hart	3
5	(United Kingdom) Tyrrell-Yamaha	2

- Note: Only the top five positions are included for both sets of standings.

Previous race: 1993 Australian Grand Prix	FIA Formula One World Championship; 1994 season	Next race: 1994 Pacific Grand Prix
Previous race: 1993 Brazilian Grand Prix	Brazilian Grand Prix	Next race: 1995 Brazilian Grand Prix
