= Footwork FA16 =

Formula One car

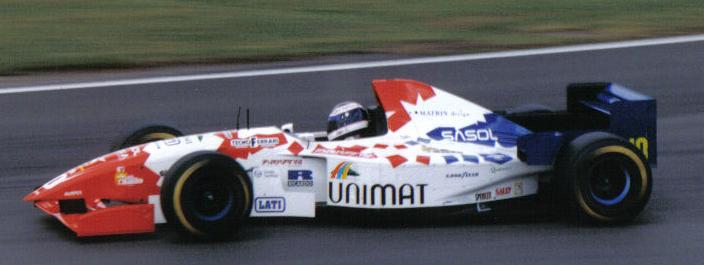
- Taki Inoue driving the FA16 at the 1995 British Grand Prix
- Category: Formula One
- Constructor: Footwork
- Designers: Alan Jenkins (Technical Director); Dave Amey (Chief Designer); Dominic Smith (Chief Aerodynamicist)
- Predecessor: FA15
- Successor: FA17

Technical specifications
- Chassis: Carbon fibre and honeycomb composite structure
- Suspension (front): Double wishbones, pushrod
- Suspension (rear): Double wishbones, pushrod
- Engine: Hart 830, 2,996 cc (182.8 cu in), V8, NA, mid-engine, longitudinally-mounted
- Transmission: Arrows / Xtrac 6-speed semi-automatic
- Power: 680 hp @ 13,100 rpm
- Fuel: Sasol
- Tyres: Goodyear

Competition history
- Notable entrants: Footwork Hart
- Notable drivers: 9. (Italy) Gianni Morbidelli; 9. (Italy) Max Papis; 10. (Japan) Taki Inoue
- Debut: 1995 Brazilian Grand Prix
- Last event: 1995 Australian Grand Prix
Races	Wins	Podiums	Poles	F/Laps
17	0	1	0	0
- Constructors' Championships: 0
- Drivers' Championships: 0

The Footwork FA16 was a Formula One car designed by Alan Jenkins and used by the Footwork team in the 1995 Formula One World Championship. The car was powered by a Hart 3-litre V8 engine and ran on Goodyear tyres. It was driven initially by Italian Gianni Morbidelli, who was in his second season with the team, and Japanese pay-driver Taki Inoue. Another Italian, Max Papis, replaced Morbidelli in mid-season due to the team's financial problems.

== Development ==
The FA16 was a developed version of the FA15. It proved to be initially quite competitive, but the team lacked the budget to carry out testing and development. The chassis was not the weak link, but the Hart engine was down on power and unreliable.

== Racing history ==
Until the final race of the season, it seemed that Morbidelli's point in Canada would not be added to, but a high rate of attrition led to the Italian taking his first podium finish. This was a real morale-booster, especially after being replaced by the inexperienced Papis for seven Grands Prix.

Papis was still generally quicker than Inoue, who is largely remembered mostly for his two incidents with official course cars more than his tardy driving. At Monaco, his car was being towed back to the pits after practice has ended, when it was struck by the official course car at a speed high enough to flip it over. Inoue was still in the car with no seat belt on, and was thrown out by the accident. He was still wearing his helmet, saving him from serious injury, and he took part in the race.

At the Hungaroring, Inoue himself was hit by the course car. His FA16 had suffered an engine failure, and Inoue's rush to get a fire extinguisher resulted in him straying into the path of the approaching car, which hit him hard enough to knock him over. Again, he was not seriously hurt.

The team eventually finished eighth in the Constructors' Championship, with five points. Morbidelli's podium ensured that they were classified ahead of Tyrrell, who scored the same number of points.

The FA16 was replaced for the 1996 season by the Footwork FA17.

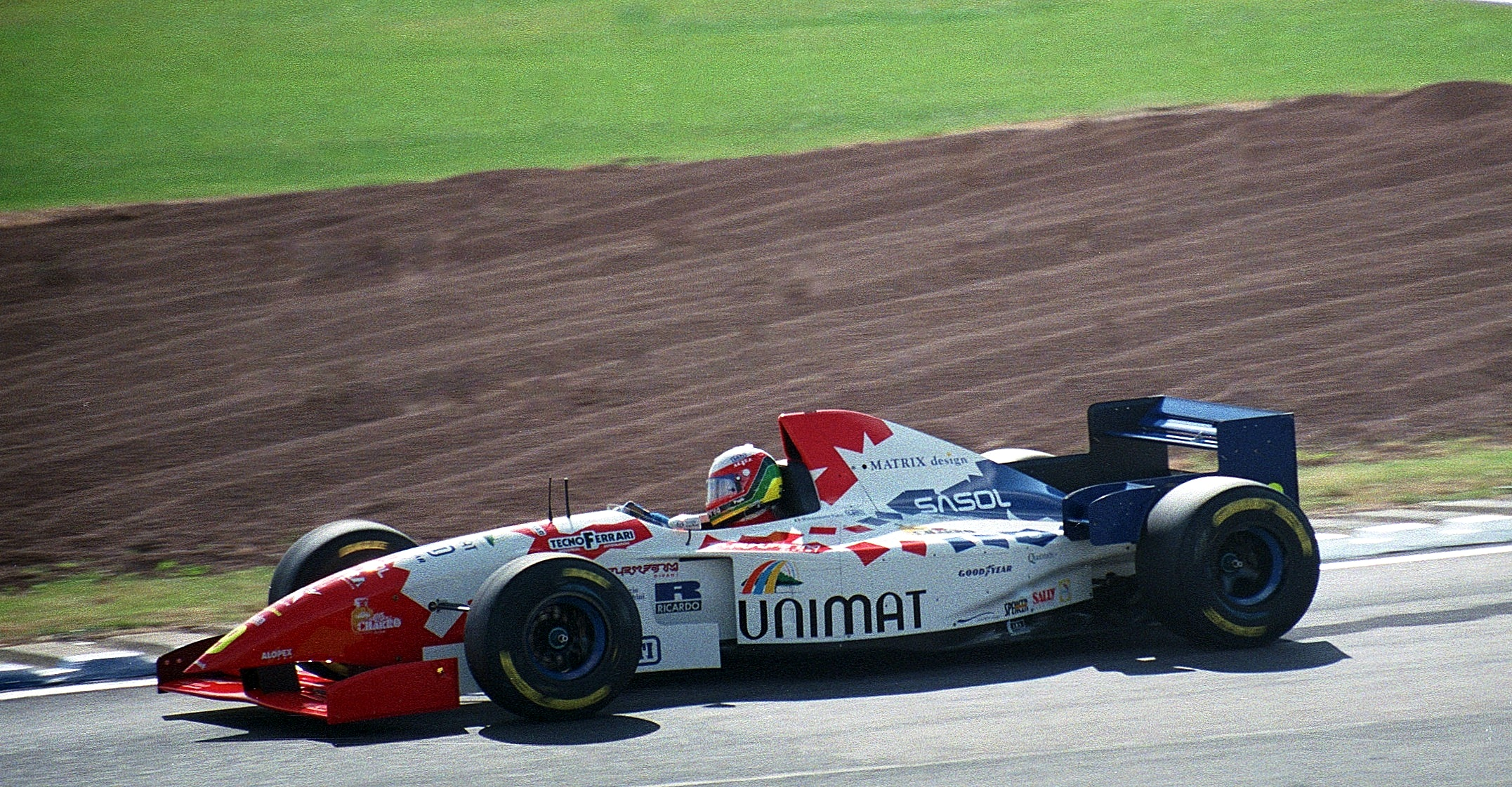
Max Papis driving the FA16 at the 1995 British Grand Prix

== Livery ==
Just like the previous season, once again the FA16's livery was usually a white base colour with a unique combination of a red and blue pattern design. Later in the season, the livery was slightly updated with a light and dark blue tone on the rear of the car to present the Hype Energy logo as well as additional pink graphics.

== Complete Formula One results ==
(key)

Year	Entrant	Engine	Tyres	Drivers	1	2	3	4	5	6	7	8	9	10	11	12	13	14	15	16	17	Pts.	WCC
1995	Footwork Hart	Hart 830; V8	G		BRA	ARG	SMR	ESP	MON	CAN	FRA	GBR	GER	HUN	BEL	ITA	POR	EUR	PAC	JPN	AUS	5	8th
1995	Footwork Hart	Hart 830; V8	G	Gianni Morbidelli	Ret	Ret	13	11	9	6	14								Ret	Ret	3	5	8th
1995	Footwork Hart	Hart 830; V8	G	Max Papis								Ret	DNS	Ret	Ret	7	DNS	12				5	8th
1995	Footwork Hart	Hart 830; V8	G	Taki Inoue	Ret	Ret	Ret	Ret	Ret	9	Ret	Ret	Ret	Ret	12	8	15	DNS	Ret	12	Ret	5	8th
