= Footwork FA13 =

Footwork FA13 Footwork FA13B
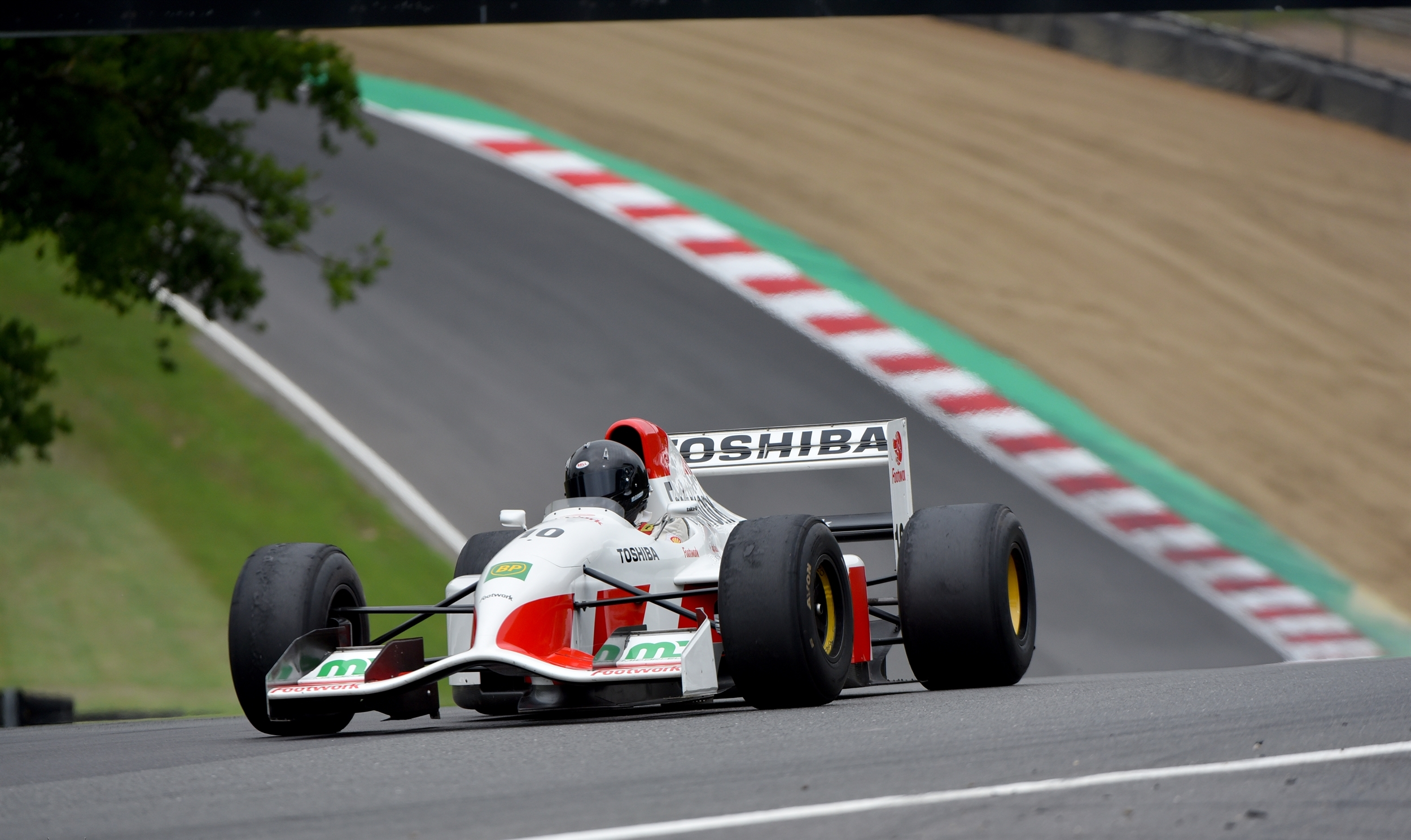
- The FA13 at the 2018 Festival Italia in Brands Hatch
- Category: Formula One
- Designers: Alan Jenkins (Technical Director); Dave Amey (Chief Designer)
- Predecessor: FA12
- Successor: FA14

Technical specifications
- Chassis: Carbon-fibre monocoque
- Engine: Mugen-Honda MF-351H V10
- Transmission: Footwork / Xtrac 6-Speed
- Power: 710 hp (529.4 kW) @ 13,500 rpm
- Fuel: BP
- Tyres: Goodyear

Competition history
- Notable entrants: Footwork Mugen Honda
- Notable drivers: 9. (Italy) Michele Alboreto; 9. (United Kingdom) Derek Warwick; 10. (Japan) Aguri Suzuki
- Debut: 1992 South African Grand Prix
- Last event: 1993 Brazilian Grand Prix
Races	Wins	Poles	F/Laps
18	0	0	0

The Footwork FA13 was a Formula One car used by the Footwork Arrows team in the 1992 Formula One World Championship and, when updated as the FA13B, in the first two races of the 1993 championship. It was powered by the Mugen-Honda V10 engine.

Designed by Alan Jenkins, it was a conventional and straightforward car. Alboreto scored four times, 5th in both the Spanish and San Marino Grands Prix and 6th in both the Brazilian and Portuguese Grands Prix, the team finishing with six points and equal 7th with Ligier in the Constructors' Championship.

== BOSS GP ==
The FA13 was later used in the BOSS GP Series, driven by Johan Rajamaki for the Rajamaki Racing team and won the Open Class title in 1996.

== Complete Formula One results ==
(key)

Year	Entrant	Chassis	Engine	Tyres	Drivers	1	2	3	4	5	6	7	8	9	10	11	12	13	14	15	16	Points	WCC
1992	Footwork Mugen Honda	FA13	Mugen Honda V10	G		RSA	MEX	BRA	ESP	SMR	MON	CAN	FRA	GBR	GER	HUN	BEL	ITA	POR	JPN	AUS	6	7th
1992	Footwork Mugen Honda	FA13	Mugen Honda V10	G	Michele Alboreto	10	13	6	5	5	7	7	7	7	9	7	Ret	7	6	15	Ret	6	7th
1992	Footwork Mugen Honda	FA13	Mugen Honda V10	G	Aguri Suzuki	8	DNQ	Ret	7	10	11	DNQ	Ret	12	Ret	Ret	9	Ret	10	8	8	6	7th
1993	Footwork Mugen Honda	FA13B	Mugen Honda V10	G		RSA	BRA	EUR	SMR	ESP	MON	CAN	FRA	GBR	GER	HUN	BEL	ITA	POR	JPN	AUS	4*	9th
1993	Footwork Mugen Honda	FA13B	Mugen Honda V10	G	Derek Warwick	7	9															4*	9th
1993	Footwork Mugen Honda	FA13B	Mugen Honda V10	G	Aguri Suzuki	Ret	Ret															4*	9th

* All 1993 points were scored using the Footwork FA14
