= Footwork FA14 =

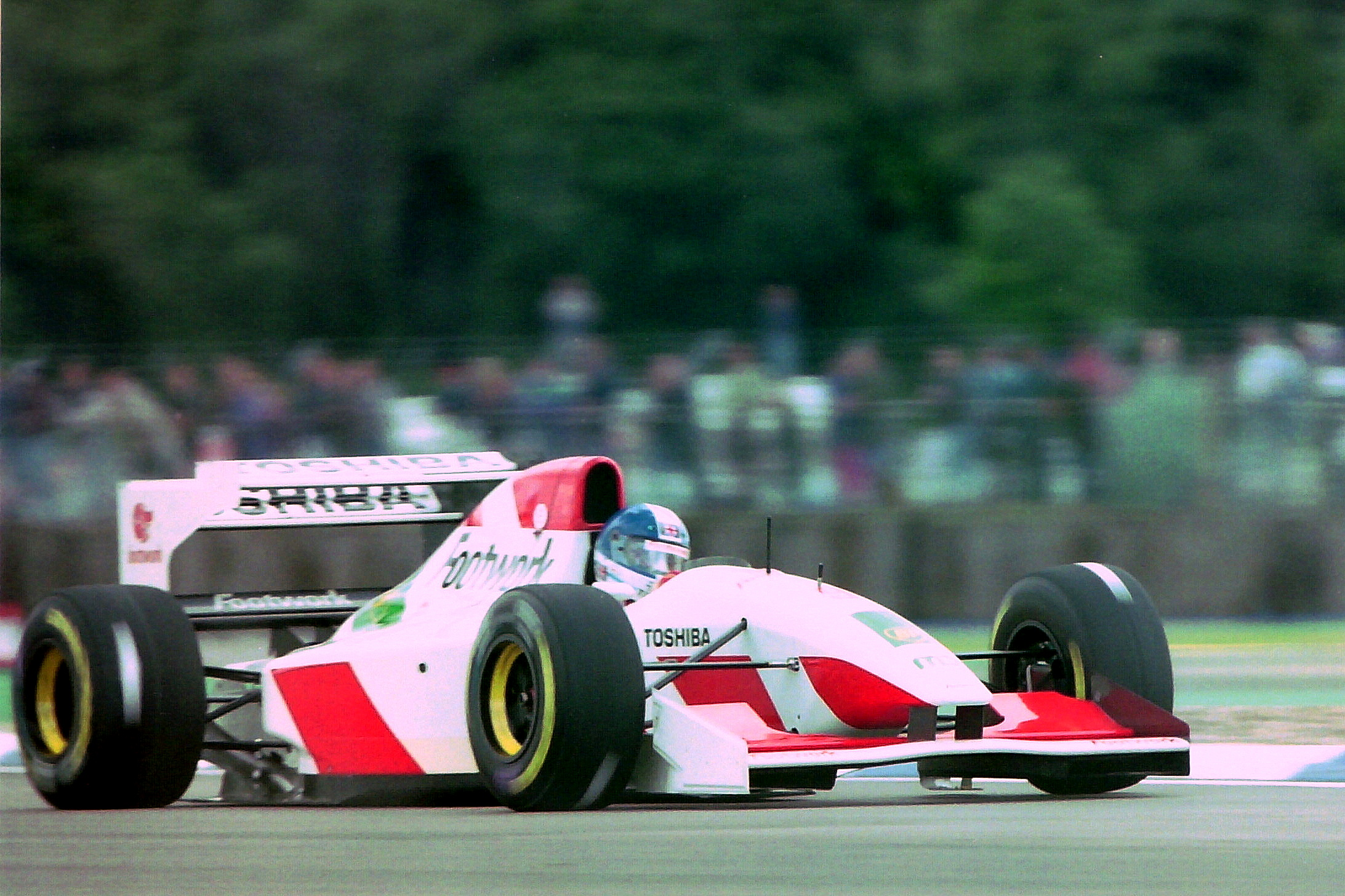
- Derek Warwick driving the FA14 at the 1993 British Grand Prix
- Category: Formula One
- Designers: Alan Jenkins (Technical Director); Dave Amey (Chief Designer); Tenji Sakai (Engine Chief Designer - Mugen Honda)
- Predecessor: FA13
- Successor: FA15

Technical specifications
- Chassis: Carbon fibre monocoque
- Axle track: Front: 1,676 mm (66.0 in); Rear: 1,600 mm (63 in)
- Wheelbase: 2,946 mm (116.0 in)
- Engine: Mugen Honda MF-351HB, 3,500 cc (213.6 cu in), V10, NA, mid-engine, longitudinally-mounted
- Transmission: Footwork / Xtrac 6-speed Semi-automatic
- Power: 720 hp (536.9 kW) @ 13,200 rpm
- Weight: 510 kg (1,120 lb)
- Fuel: BP
- Tyres: Goodyear

Competition history
- Notable entrants: Footwork Mugen-Honda
- Notable drivers: 9. (United Kingdom) Derek Warwick; 10. (Japan) Aguri Suzuki
- Debut: 1993 European Grand Prix
- Last event: 1993 Australian Grand Prix
Races	Wins	Poles	F/Laps
14	0	0	0

The Footwork FA14 was a Formula One car with which the Footwork team competed in part of the 1993 Formula One season. It replaced the FA13B, a revised version of the previous year's FA13 chassis that had been used for the first two races of that season. It was driven by veteran Derek Warwick, returning from a two-year sabbatical during which he won the 1992 World Sportscar Championship and the 1992 24 Hours of Le Mans driving for Peugeot, and Aguri Suzuki, retained from 1992.

== Race history ==
At its first race, the attritional European GP at Donington Park, neither driver finished. The FA14's performance proved to be patchy; Suzuki managed a run of seven straight retirements towards the end of the season, while Warwick frequently finished outside the top ten. However, over the course of the season the car's performance steadily improved, with Warwick finishing sixth at his home race at Silverstone, and then fourth at the Hungaroring for his final F1 points. Suzuki's improvement throughout the season was even more marked; after qualifying on the back row at Donington, he qualified sixth at Spa ahead of Warwick and was running fifth until his gearbox retired, and finished seventh at the final race at Adelaide, although he and Warwick did collide at the first corner at Monza.

From the British Grand Prix until the end of the season when such things would be banned, the Footwork FA14s ran with active suspension after having bought a copy of the TAG Electronics developed system from McLaren giving it the same 1993 spec system McLaren used on their own car.

1993 proved to be both drivers' final full season in F1. Warwick retired at the end of the season, while Suzuki drove briefly for Jordan and Ligier in the following seasons. For the 1994 season they were replaced by Christian Fittipaldi and Gianni Morbidelli.

== Race results ==
(key)

Year	Entrant	Engine	Tyres	Drivers	1	2	3	4	5	6	7	8	9	10	11	12	13	14	15	16	Points	WCC
1993	Footwork Mugen Honda	Mugen-Honda V10	G		RSA	BRA	EUR	SMR	ESP	MON	CAN	FRA	GBR	GER	HUN	BEL	ITA	POR	JPN	AUS	4	9th
1993	Footwork Mugen Honda	Mugen-Honda V10	G	Derek Warwick			Ret	Ret	13	Ret	16	13	6	17	4	Ret	Ret	15†	14†	10	4	9th
1993	Footwork Mugen Honda	Mugen-Honda V10	G	Aguri Suzuki			Ret	9	10	Ret	13	12	Ret	Ret	Ret	Ret	Ret	Ret	Ret	7	4	9th

† Driver did not finish the race, but were still classified as they completed 90% of the race distance.
