= Footwork FA17 =

Formula One Car

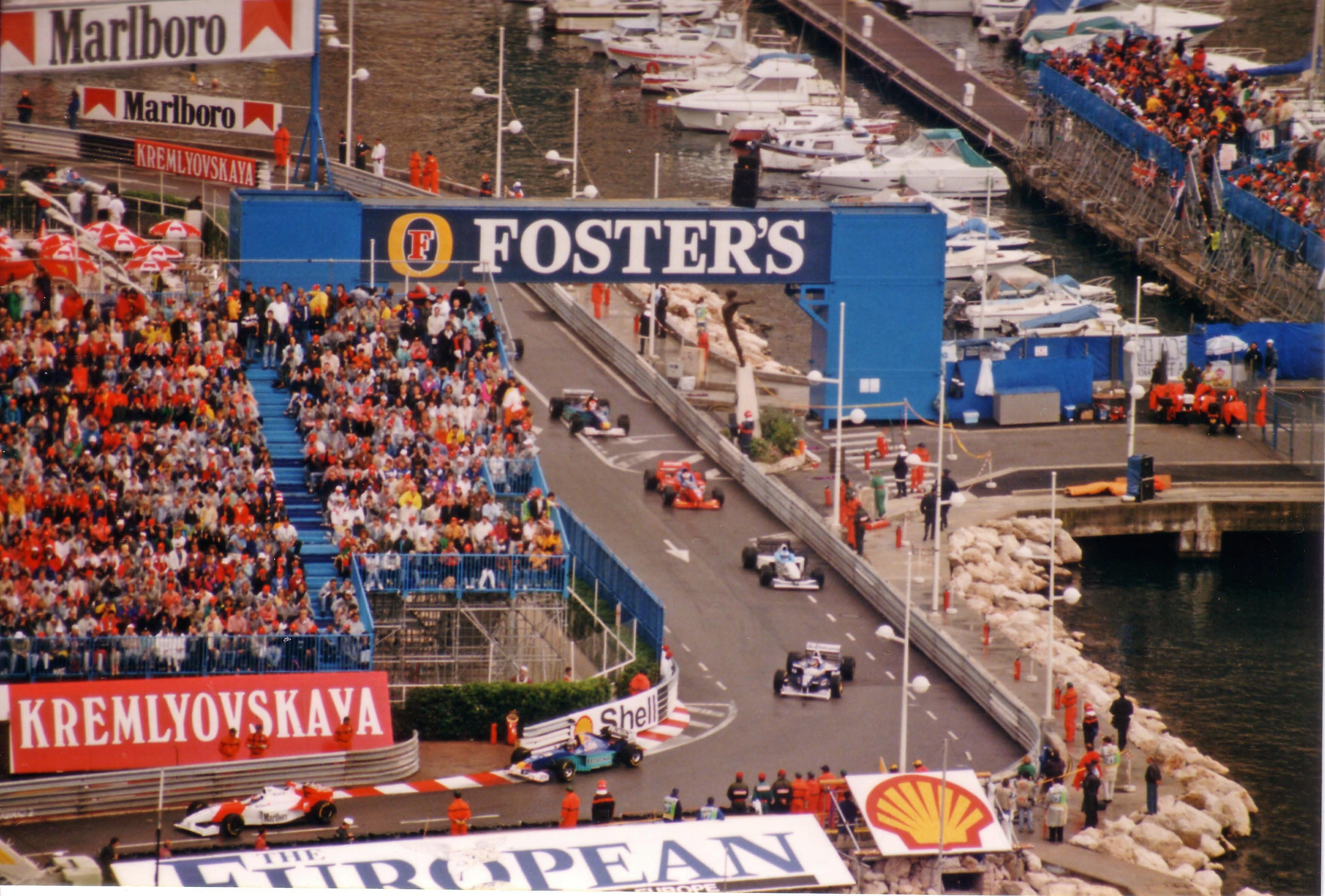
- Formation lap of the 1996 Monaco Grand Prix. Fifth in the line is the Footwork FA17 of Jos Verstappen.
- Category: Formula One
- Constructor: Footwork
- Designers: Alan Jenkins (Technical Director); Dave Amey (Chief Designer); Simon Jennings (Head of Aerodynamics)
- Predecessor: FA16
- Successor: Arrows A18

Technical specifications
- Chassis: carbon-fibre and honeycomb composite structure
- Suspension (front): pushrod, wishbones
- Suspension (rear): pushrod, wishbones
- Engine: Hart 830 72-degree V8
- Transmission: Arrows six-speed longitudinal semi-automatic
- Power: 680 hp @ 13,100 rpm
- Fuel: Castrol
- Tyres: Goodyear

Competition history
- Notable entrants: Footwork Hart
- Notable drivers: 16. (Brazil) Ricardo Rosset; 17. (Netherlands) Jos Verstappen
- Debut: 1996 Australian Grand Prix
- Last event: 1996 Japanese Grand Prix
Races	Wins	Poles	F/Laps
16	0	0	0
- Constructors' Championships: 0
- Drivers' Championships: 0

The Footwork FA17 was the car with which the Footwork team competed in the 1996 Formula One World Championship. It was driven by Dutchman Jos Verstappen, who moved from Simtek, and Brazilian Ricardo Rosset, who graduated from Formula 3000.

== Development ==
Footwork was bought by Tom Walkinshaw from one of the Arrows team's original founders, Jackie Oliver, early in the season. 1996 thus became a write-off as the team's focus switched to 1997. This was something of a disappointment, since the FA17 was competitive at the start of the year in the hands of Jos Verstappen. Technical director Alan Jenkins left early on in the season bound for Stewart. Walkinshaw replaced him with Frank Dernie, who moved from Ligier along with Walkinshaw. The lack of development and the lack of power from the Hart V8 engine saw the team slip to the back of the grid by season's end. Hart had planned to build a V10 unit but did not have sufficient funds. Progress was further hampered by the team's testing contract with Bridgestone; the Japanese tyre supplier preparing for entry into F1 in 1997. The FA17 was the first Arrows driven by Damon Hill upon his signing for the team ahead of the 1997 season.

== Race history ==
Throughout the season, Verstappen proved to be very much the faster Footwork driver, but his reliability record was poor, only finishing a single race in the first half of the season (at Buenos Aires, where he finished sixth). He suffered numerous mechanical failures, including a sticking throttle which caused a huge accident at Spa which left him with permanent neck injuries. He also caused a major scare at Imola when he left a pit stop early and ripped the fuel hose from its tank, covering the garage with flammable fuel. By contrast, Rosset was surprisingly steady for a rookie driver, finishing half the races, but was noticeably slower than his teammate. Ultimately, neither driver was retained for 1997; World Champion Damon Hill made the surprising decision to join the team after being dumped by Williams, and Pedro Diniz with his sponsorship money was chosen to be his number two.

The team eventually finished ninth in the Constructors' Championship, with one point.

== After Formula One ==
The Austrian racing driver Fritz Glatz used a Footwork FA17 in the 2002 EuroBOSS series. At the race in Most after a collision he became airborne and rolled the car. Glatz, driving under the pseudonym “Frederico Careca”, died from internal bleeding and major vertebral injuries.

== Complete Formula One results ==
(key) (results in bold indicate pole position)

Year	Entrant	Engine	Tyres	Drivers	1	2	3	4	5	6	7	8	9	10	11	12	13	14	15	16	Points	WCC
1996	Footwork Hart	Hart V8	**G**		AUS	BRA	ARG	EUR	SMR	MON	ESP	CAN	FRA	GBR	GER	HUN	BEL	ITA	POR	JPN	**1**	**9th**
1996	Footwork Hart	Hart V8	**G**	Ricardo Rosset	9	Ret	Ret	11	Ret	Ret	Ret	Ret	11	Ret	11	8	9	Ret	14	13	**1**	**9th**
1996	Footwork Hart	Hart V8	**G**	Jos Verstappen	Ret	Ret	6	Ret	Ret	Ret	Ret	Ret	Ret	10	Ret	Ret	Ret	8	Ret	11	**1**	**9th**
