= Rod Nelson =

Former British motorsports engineer

- Born: 29 August 1961 (age 64)
- Citizenship: British
- Occupation: Formula One race engineer
- Employer(s): Williams Racing, Renault F1 Team

Rod Nelson (born 29 August 1961) is a former British Formula One engineer, best known for engineering Fernando Alonso to his two World Drivers’ Championship titles with Renault F1 Team.

== Career ==
Nelson studied at Cardiff University, specialising in computer-controlled hydraulic systems, a field of particular relevance during Formula One’s development of active suspension technology in the late 1980s. Upon completing his doctorate, he joined the Footwork Arrows Formula One team in 1991, working within Alan Jenkins' research and development group on active suspension projects.

After two years with Footwork, Nelson was recruited by Simtek Research, contributing to the company’s German Touring Car Championship programme with BMW and Johnny Cecotto. He later moved into Simtek Grand Prix as the team entered Formula One, assisting in the design of the car and engineering David Brabham during the team’s debut season in 1994. Nelson remained with Simtek until the team ceased operations for financial reasons in 1995.

Following Simtek’s closure, Nelson joined Arrows Grand Prix International to engineer Ricardo Rosset in 1996. The following year he moved to Benetton Formula, reuniting with Nick Wirth and working within the team’s engineering group. He contributed to the race engineering of Gerhard Berger for 1997 and then moved to supporting Alexander Wurz for the following three seasons from 1998 to 2000. Nelson then moved into a performance-focused engineering role as the Enstone team transitioned into the Renault F1 Team. He returned to a race engineering position for the 2005 season, working with Fernando Alonso during the Spaniard’s maiden World Drivers’ Championship victory. Nelson continued as Alonso’s race engineer in 2006, when he secured a second consecutive title.

For the 2007 season, Nelson joined Williams Racing as Chief Operations Engineer, becoming technical lead for trackside engineering and vehicle dynamics. After three seasons in the role, he returned to Enstone, moving into a consultant performance engineering positions at Renault and later Lotus F1 Team

Nelson went back to Williams in 2014 as Chief Test and Support Engineer. In this role he was responsible for planning and running all full-scale testing programmes, development of simulator-supporting software, and technical liaison with external partners. He then went on to be head of vehicle performance at the NIO Formula E Team, and is now working at Applus+ IDIADA as a homologation manager.
