= Footwork FA15 =

Formula One Car

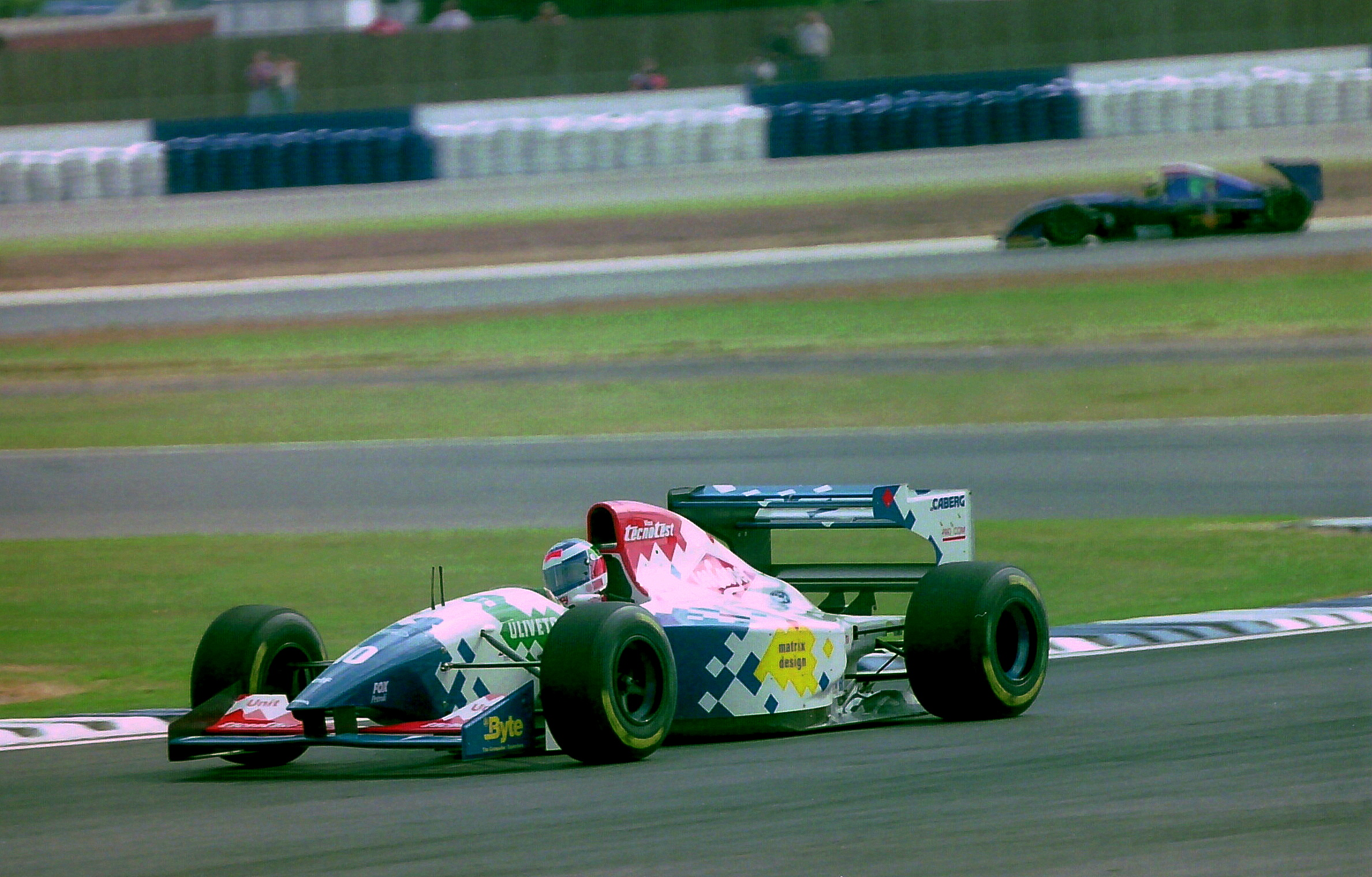
- Gianni Morbidelli driving the FA15 at the 1994 British Grand Prix
- Category: Formula One
- Designers: Alan Jenkins (Technical Director); Dave Amey (Chief Designer)
- Predecessor: FA14
- Successor: FA16

Technical specifications
- Chassis: Carbon fibre monocoque
- Axle track: Front: 1,676 mm (66.0 in); Rear: 1,600 mm (63 in)
- Wheelbase: 2,921 mm (115.0 in)
- Engine: Ford HBE7 / Ford HBE8, 3.5-litre, 75-degree, V8
- Transmission: Footwork / Xtrac 6-speed
- Power: 700 hp @ 13,000 rpm
- Fuel: Elf
- Tyres: Goodyear

Competition history
- Notable entrants: Footwork Arrows
- Notable drivers: 9. (Brazil) Christian Fittipaldi; 10. (Italy) Gianni Morbidelli
- Debut: 1994 Brazilian Grand Prix
- Last event: 1994 Australian Grand Prix
| Races | Wins | Podiums | Poles | F/Laps |
|---|---|---|---|---|
| 16 | 0 | 0 | 0 | 0 |

The Footwork FA15 was a Formula One car with which the Footwork team competed in the 1994 Formula One World Championship. The number 9 seat was taken by Christian Fittipaldi and the number 10 seat was taken by Gianni Morbidelli. The team never employed a test driver and did not have a main sponsor.

== Design ==
The FA15 used the Ford HBE7/HBE8 3.5-litre V8 engine, the same engine used on the McLaren MP4/8 from the previous season.

== Race history ==
The FA15 was very competitive in the early races of the year: Morbidelli qualified sixth in Brazil, Fittipaldi finished fourth in Aida (where Morbidelli retired from fifth), and Fittipaldi qualified sixth and ran fifth in Monaco before he suffered a gearbox failure, whilst Morbidelli qualified seventh. But after that, the team's performance began to suffer, with Morbidelli only finishing four races in the entire season and Fittipaldi frequently finishing outside the points.

However, the team still managed the occasional good performance. Morbidelli ran well in Canada, whilst Fittipaldi finished sixth, only to be disqualified due to being underweight. In Germany the cars finished fourth and fifth, with Morbidelli scoring a point in Belgium and qualifying a strong eighth in Jerez for the European GP.

The team finished 9th in the Constructors' Championship, with nine points, a respectable performance. Fittipaldi left Formula One at the end of the season, and was replaced by Taki Inoue for 1995.

== Livery ==
The Footwork FA15 of Christian Fittipaldi

After three-years with the traditional red ribbon Footwork livery, the livery was changed by retaining the same white base colour with a unique combination red and blue pattern design livery. For the remainder of the season, the yellow bit was added.

== Complete Formula One results ==
(key)

| Year | Entrant | Engine | Tyres | Drivers | 1 | 2 | 3 | 4 | 5 | 6 | 7 | 8 | 9 | 10 | 11 | 12 | 13 | 14 | 15 | 16 | Pts. | WCC |
|---|---|---|---|---|---|---|---|---|---|---|---|---|---|---|---|---|---|---|---|---|---|---|
| 1994 | Footwork Arrows | Ford HBE7/8 V8 | G | | BRA | PAC | SMR | MON | ESP | CAN | FRA | GBR | GER | HUN | BEL | ITA | POR | EUR | JPN | AUS | 9 | 9th |
| 1994 | Footwork Arrows | Ford HBE7/8 V8 | G | Christian Fittipaldi | Ret | 4 | 13 | Ret | Ret | DSQ | 8 | 9 | 4 | 14 | Ret | Ret | 8 | 17 | 8 | 8 | 9 | 9th |
| 1994 | Footwork Arrows | Ford HBE7/8 V8 | G | Gianni Morbidelli | Ret | Ret | Ret | Ret | Ret | Ret | Ret | Ret | 5 | Ret | 6 | Ret | 9 | 11 | Ret | Ret | 9 | 9th |
