= Hart 830 engine =

Hart 830

Overview
- Manufacturer: (United Kingdom) Hart
- Production: 1995–1997

Layout
- Configuration: 72° V8
- Displacement: 3.0 L (183.1 cu in)
- Cylinder block material: Aluminum alloy
- Cylinder head material: Aluminum alloy
- Valvetrain: 32-valve, DOHC, four-valves per cylinder
- Compression ratio: 12.5:1

Combustion
- Fuel system: Direct fuel injection
- Fuel type: Gasoline
- Cooling system: Water-cooled

Output
- Power output: 680 hp (507 kW; 689 PS)
- Torque output: 320 lb⋅ft (434 N⋅m)

Dimensions
- Length: 515 mm (20.3 in)
- Width: 570 mm (22 in)
- Height: 560 mm (22 in)
- Dry weight: 115 kg (254 lb)

The Hart 830 is a four-stroke, naturally aspirated, 3.0-litre, V8 racing engine, designed and made by Hart Racing Engines, and specially developed and tuned by British engineer Brian Hart, for Formula One racing, between 1995 and 1997. The engines were used by Footwork and Minardi. It developed 680 hp (510 kW), making it one of the more powerful V8 engines on the field.

== Applications ==
- Footwork FA16
- Footwork FA17
- Minardi M197
