= 1996 San Marino Grand Prix =

Race 5 of 16 in the 1996 Formula One World Championship
← Previous race	Next race →

Race details
- Date: 5 May 1996
- Official name: XVI Gran Premio di San Marino
- Location: Autodromo Enzo e Dino Ferrari, Imola, Emilia-Romagna, Italy
- Course: Permanent race track
- Course length: 4.892 km (3.052 miles)
- Distance: 63 laps, 308.196 km (192.262 miles)
- Weather: Sunny

Pole position
Driver	(Germany) Michael Schumacher	Ferrari
- Time: 1:26.890

Fastest lap
Driver	(United Kingdom) Damon Hill	Williams-Renault
- Time: 1:28.931 on lap 49

Podium
First	(United Kingdom) Damon Hill	Williams-Renault
Second	(Germany) Michael Schumacher	Ferrari
Third	(Austria) Gerhard Berger	Benetton-Renault

The 1996 San Marino Grand Prix was a Formula One motor race held on 5 May 1996 at the Autodromo Enzo e Dino Ferrari, Imola, Emilia-Romagna, Italy. It was the fifth round of the 1996 Formula One season. The 63-lap race was won by Damon Hill driving for the Williams team after starting from second position. Michael Schumacher finished second driving a Ferrari, despite his front-right brake seizing halfway around the final lap, with Gerhard Berger third driving for the Benetton team. Jacques Villeneuve retired near the end of the race after being hit by Jean Alesi.

== Classification ==
=== Qualifying ===
Pos	No	Driver	Constructor	Time	Gap
1	1	(Germany) Michael Schumacher	Ferrari	1:26.890	
2	5	(United Kingdom) Damon Hill	Williams-Renault	1:27.105	+0.215
3	6	(Canada) Jacques Villeneuve	Williams-Renault	1:27.220	+0.330
4	8	(United Kingdom) David Coulthard	McLaren-Mercedes	1:27.688	+0.798
5	3	(France) Jean Alesi	Benetton-Renault	1:28.009	+1.119
6	2	(United Kingdom) Eddie Irvine	Ferrari	1:28.205	+1.315
7	4	(Austria) Gerhard Berger	Benetton-Renault	1:28.336	+1.446
8	19	(Finland) Mika Salo	Tyrrell-Yamaha	1:28.423	+1.533
9	11	(Brazil) Rubens Barrichello	Jordan-Peugeot	1:28.632	+1.742
10	15	(Germany) Heinz-Harald Frentzen	Sauber-Ford	1:28.785	+1.895
11	7	(Finland) Mika Häkkinen	McLaren-Mercedes	1:29.079	+2.189
12	12	(United Kingdom) Martin Brundle	Jordan-Peugeot	1:29.099	+2.209
13	9	(France) Olivier Panis	Ligier-Mugen-Honda	1:29.472	+2.582
14	17	(Netherlands) Jos Verstappen	Footwork-Hart	1:29.539	+2.649
15	14	(United Kingdom) Johnny Herbert	Sauber-Ford	1:29.541	+2.651
16	18	(Japan) Ukyo Katayama	Tyrrell-Yamaha	1:29.892	+3.002
17	10	(Brazil) Pedro Diniz	Ligier-Mugen-Honda	1:29.989	+3.099
18	20	(Portugal) Pedro Lamy	Minardi-Ford	1:30.471	+3.581
19	21	(Italy) Giancarlo Fisichella	Minardi-Ford	1:30.814	+3.924
20	16	(Brazil) Ricardo Rosset	Footwork-Hart	1:31.316	+4.426
21	22	(Italy) Luca Badoer	Forti-Ford	1:32.037	+5.147
107% time: 1:32.972
DNQ	23	(Italy) Andrea Montermini	Forti-Ford	1:33.685	+6.795

=== Race ===
Pos	No	Driver	Constructor	Laps	Time/Retired	Grid	Points
1	5	(United Kingdom) Damon Hill	Williams-Renault	63	1:35:26.156	2	10
2	1	(Germany) Michael Schumacher	Ferrari	63	+16.460	1	6
3	4	(Austria) Gerhard Berger	Benetton-Renault	63	+46.891	7	4
4	2	(United Kingdom) Eddie Irvine	Ferrari	63	+1:01.583	6	3
5	11	(Brazil) Rubens Barrichello	Jordan-Peugeot	63	+1:18.490	9	2
6	3	(France) Jean Alesi	Benetton-Renault	62	+1 Lap	5	1
7	10	(Brazil) Pedro Diniz	Ligier-Mugen-Honda	62	+1 Lap	17	
8	7	(Finland) Mika Häkkinen	McLaren-Mercedes	61	Engine	11	
9	20	(Portugal) Pedro Lamy	Minardi-Ford	61	+2 Laps	18	
10	22	(Italy) Luca Badoer	Forti-Ford	59	+4 Laps	21	
11	6	(Canada) Jacques Villeneuve	Williams-Renault	57	Suspension	3	
Ret	9	(France) Olivier Panis	Ligier-Mugen-Honda	54	Engine	13	
Ret	18	(Japan) Ukyo Katayama	Tyrrell-Yamaha	45	Spun Off	16	
Ret	8	(United Kingdom) David Coulthard	McLaren-Mercedes	44	Hydraulics	4	
Ret	16	(Brazil) Ricardo Rosset	Footwork-Hart	40	Engine	20	
Ret	17	(Netherlands) Jos Verstappen	Footwork-Hart	38	Hydraulics	14	
Ret	12	(United Kingdom) Martin Brundle	Jordan-Peugeot	36	Spun Off	12	
Ret	15	(Germany) Heinz-Harald Frentzen	Sauber-Ford	32	Brakes	10	
Ret	21	(Italy) Giancarlo Fisichella	Minardi-Ford	30	Engine	19	
Ret	14	(United Kingdom) Johnny Herbert	Sauber-Ford	25	Electrical	15	
Ret	19	(Finland) Mika Salo	Tyrrell-Yamaha	23	Engine	8	

== Championship standings after the race ==
Drivers' Championship standings

Pos	Driver	Points
1	(United Kingdom) Damon Hill	43
2	(Canada) Jacques Villeneuve	22
3	(Germany) Michael Schumacher	16
4	(France) Jean Alesi	11
5	(United Kingdom) Eddie Irvine	9

Constructors' Championship standings

Pos	Constructor	Points
1	(United Kingdom) Williams-Renault	65
2	(Italy) Ferrari	25
3	(Italy) Benetton-Renault	18
4	(United Kingdom) McLaren-Mercedes	9
5	(Republic of Ireland) Jordan-Peugeot	8

- Note: Only the top five positions are included for both sets of standings.

Previous race: 1996 European Grand Prix	FIA Formula One World Championship; 1996 season	Next race: 1996 Monaco Grand Prix
Previous race: 1995 San Marino Grand Prix	San Marino Grand Prix	Next race: 1997 San Marino Grand Prix
