= 1995 French Grand Prix =

Race 7 of 17 in the 1995 Formula One World Championship
← Previous race	Next race →

Race details
- Date: 2 July 1995
- Official name: LXXXI Grand Prix de France
- Location: Circuit de Nevers Magny-Cours; Magny-Cours, France
- Course: Permanent racing facility
- Course length: 4.250 km (2.641 miles)
- Distance: 72 laps, 305.814 km (190.024 miles)
- Weather: Cloudy, light drizzle at times

Pole position
Driver	(United Kingdom) Damon Hill	Williams-Renault
- Time: 1:17.225

Fastest lap
Driver	(Germany) Michael Schumacher	Benetton-Renault
- Time: 1:20.218 on lap 51

Podium
First	(Germany) Michael Schumacher	Benetton-Renault
Second	(United Kingdom) Damon Hill	Williams-Renault
Third	(United Kingdom) David Coulthard	Williams-Renault

The 1995 French Grand Prix was a Formula One motor race held at Magny-Cours on 2 July 1995. It was the seventh race of the 1995 Formula One World Championship.

The 72-lap race was won by German Michael Schumacher, driving a Benetton-Renault, after he started from second position. Briton Damon Hill took pole position in his Williams-Renault and led until he was overtaken by Schumacher during the first round of pit stops. Schumacher's eventual winning margin over Hill was 31 seconds, with Hill's compatriot and teammate David Coulthard third.

== Classification ==
=== Qualifying ===
Pos	No	Driver	Constructor	Q1 Time	Q2 Time	Gap
1	5	(United Kingdom) Damon Hill	Williams-Renault	1:18.556	1:17.225	
2	1	(Germany) Michael Schumacher	Benetton-Renault	1:18.893	1:17.512	+0.287
3	6	(United Kingdom) David Coulthard	Williams-Renault	1:18.585	1:17.925	+0.700
4	27	(France) Jean Alesi	Ferrari	1:19.254	1:18.761	+1.536
5	14	(Brazil) Rubens Barrichello	Jordan-Peugeot	1:19.763	1:18.810	+1.585
6	26	(France) Olivier Panis	Ligier-Mugen-Honda	1:19.466	1:19.047	+1.822
7	28	(Austria) Gerhard Berger	Ferrari	1:19.051	1:19.295	+1.826
8	8	(Finland) Mika Häkkinen	McLaren-Mercedes	1:20.218	1:19.238	+2.013
9	25	(United Kingdom) Martin Brundle	Ligier-Mugen-Honda	1:19.384	1:19.524	+2.159
10	2	(United Kingdom) Johnny Herbert	Benetton-Renault	1:19.555	1:20.000	+2.330
11	15	(United Kingdom) Eddie Irvine	Jordan-Peugeot	1:20.713	1:19.845	+2.620
12	30	(Germany) Heinz-Harald Frentzen	Sauber-Ford	1:21.111	1:20.309	+3.084
13	7	(United Kingdom) Mark Blundell	McLaren-Mercedes	1:20.804	1:20.527	+3.302
14	4	(Finland) Mika Salo	Tyrrell-Yamaha	1:21.921	1:20.796	+3.571
15	29	(France) Jean-Christophe Boullion	Sauber-Ford	1:22.382	1:20.943	+3.718
16	9	(Italy) Gianni Morbidelli	Footwork-Hart	1:21.756	1:21.076	+3.851
17	24	(Italy) Luca Badoer	Minardi-Ford	No time	1:21.323	+4.098
18	10	(Japan) Taki Inoue	Footwork-Hart	1:23.355	1:21.894	+4.669
19	3	(Japan) Ukyo Katayama	Tyrrell-Yamaha	1:22.959	1:21.930	+4.705
20	23	(Italy) Pierluigi Martini	Minardi-Ford	No time	1:22.104	+4.879
21	17	(Italy) Andrea Montermini	Pacific-Ford	1:24.172	1:23.466	+6.241
22	16	(France) Bertrand Gachot	Pacific-Ford	1:24.509	1:23.647	+6.422
23	21	(Brazil) Pedro Diniz	Forti-Ford	1:25.787	1:24.184	+6.959
24	22	(Brazil) Roberto Moreno	Forti-Ford	1:26.445	1:24.865	+7.640

=== Race ===
Pos	No	Driver	Constructor	Laps	Time/Retired	Grid	Points
1	1	(Germany) Michael Schumacher	Benetton-Renault	72	1:38:28.429	2	10
2	5	(United Kingdom) Damon Hill	Williams-Renault	72	+ 31.309	1	6
3	6	(United Kingdom) David Coulthard	Williams-Renault	72	+ 1:02.826	3	4
4	25	(United Kingdom) Martin Brundle	Ligier-Mugen-Honda	72	+ 1:03.293	9	3
5	27	(France) Jean Alesi	Ferrari	72	+ 1:17.869	4	2
6	14	(Brazil) Rubens Barrichello	Jordan-Peugeot	71	+ 1 lap	5	1
7	8	(Finland) Mika Häkkinen	McLaren-Mercedes	71	+ 1 lap	8	
8	26	(France) Olivier Panis	Ligier-Mugen-Honda	71	+ 1 lap	6	
9	15	(United Kingdom) Eddie Irvine	Jordan-Peugeot	71	+ 1 lap	11	
10	30	(Germany) Heinz-Harald Frentzen	Sauber-Ford	71	+ 1 lap	12	
11	7	(United Kingdom) Mark Blundell	McLaren-Mercedes	70	+ 2 laps	13	
12	28	(Austria) Gerhard Berger	Ferrari	70	+ 2 laps	7	
13	24	(Italy) Luca Badoer	Minardi-Ford	69	+ 3 laps	17	
14	9	(Italy) Gianni Morbidelli	Footwork-Hart	69	+ 3 laps	16	
15	4	(Finland) Mika Salo	Tyrrell-Yamaha	69	+ 3 laps	14	
16	22	(Brazil) Roberto Moreno	Forti-Ford	66	+ 6 laps	24	
NC	17	(Italy) Andrea Montermini	Pacific-Ford	62	+ 10 laps	21	
Ret	29	(France) Jean-Christophe Boullion	Sauber-Ford	48	Gearbox	15	
Ret	16	(France) Bertrand Gachot	Pacific-Ford	24	Gearbox	22	
Ret	23	(Italy) Pierluigi Martini	Minardi-Ford	23	Gearbox	20	
Ret	2	(United Kingdom) Johnny Herbert	Benetton-Renault	2	Collision	10	
Ret	10	(Japan) Taki Inoue	Footwork-Hart	0	Collision	18	
Ret	3	(Japan) Ukyo Katayama	Tyrrell-Yamaha	0	Collision	19	
Ret	21	(Brazil) Pedro Diniz	Forti-Ford	0	Spun off	23	

== Championship standings after the race ==
Drivers' Championship standings

Pos	Driver	Points
1	(Germany) Michael Schumacher	46
2	(United Kingdom) Damon Hill	35
3	(France) Jean Alesi	26
4	(Austria) Gerhard Berger	17
5	(United Kingdom) David Coulthard	13

Constructors' Championship standings

Pos	Constructor	Points
1	(United Kingdom) Benetton-Renault	48
2	(Italy) Ferrari	43
3	(United Kingdom) Williams-Renault	42
4	(Republic of Ireland) Jordan-Peugeot	13
5	(United Kingdom) McLaren-Mercedes	8

- Note: Only the top five positions are included for both sets of standings.

Previous race: 1995 Canadian Grand Prix	FIA Formula One World Championship; 1995 season	Next race: 1995 British Grand Prix
Previous race: 1994 French Grand Prix	French Grand Prix	Next race: 1996 French Grand Prix
