= 1995 Hungarian Grand Prix =

Race 10 of 17 in the 1995 Formula One World Championship
← Previous race	Next race →

Race details
- Date: 13 August 1995
- Official name: XI Marlboro Magyar Nagydij
- Location: Hungaroring; Mogyoród, Pest, Hungary
- Course: Permanent racing facility
- Course length: 3.968 km (2.466 miles)
- Distance: 77 laps, 305.536 km (189.851 miles)
- Weather: Sunny

Pole position
Driver	(United Kingdom) Damon Hill	Williams-Renault
- Time: 1:16.982

Fastest lap
Driver	(United Kingdom) Damon Hill	Williams-Renault
- Time: 1:20.247 on lap 34

Podium
First	(United Kingdom) Damon Hill	Williams-Renault
Second	(United Kingdom) David Coulthard	Williams-Renault
Third	(Austria) Gerhard Berger	Ferrari

The 1995 Hungarian Grand Prix (formally the XI Marlboro Magyar Nagydij) was a Formula One motor race held on 13 August 1995 at the Hungaroring, Mogyoród, Pest, Hungary. It was the tenth race of the 1995 Formula One World Championship.

The 77-lap race was won by Damon Hill, driving a Williams-Renault. Hill took his third victory of the season after starting from pole position, leading all 77 laps and setting the fastest race lap. Teammate David Coulthard finished second, with Gerhard Berger third in a Ferrari.

The Jordan team were waiting on the pitwall for Rubens Barrichello to claim 3rd place, however his engine died on the last corner, and he crawled to the line in 7th.

Pedro Lamy replaced Pierluigi Martini at Minardi.

Taki Inoue was hit by a safety car Tatra 623 as he attempted to extinguish a fire on his Footwork, this was his second incident with a safety car in this season. He suffered minor injuries.

== Classification ==
=== Qualifying ===
Pos	No	Driver	Constructor	Q1	Q2	Gap
1	5	(United Kingdom) Damon Hill	Williams-Renault	1:18.374	1:16.982	
2	6	(United Kingdom) David Coulthard	Williams-Renault	1:19.000	1:17.366	+0.384
3	1	(Germany) Michael Schumacher	Benetton-Renault	1:19.490	1:17.558	+0.576
4	28	(Austria) Gerhard Berger	Ferrari	1:19.033	1:18.059	+1.077
5	8	(Finland) Mika Häkkinen	McLaren-Mercedes	1:20.577	1:18.363	+1.381
6	27	(France) Jean Alesi	Ferrari	1:20.134	1:18.968	+1.986
7	15	(United Kingdom) Eddie Irvine	Jordan-Peugeot	1:21.246	1:19.499	+2.517
8	25	(United Kingdom) Martin Brundle	Ligier-Mugen-Honda	1:21.818	1:19.748	+2.766
9	2	(United Kingdom) Johnny Herbert	Benetton-Renault	1:21.878	1:20.072	+3.090
10	26	(France) Olivier Panis	Ligier-Mugen-Honda	1:20.952	1:20.160	+3.178
11	30	(Germany) Heinz-Harald Frentzen	Sauber-Ford	1:21.234	1:20.413	+3.431
12	24	(Italy) Luca Badoer	Minardi-Ford	1:22.345	1:20.543	+3.561
13	7	(United Kingdom) Mark Blundell	McLaren-Mercedes	1:21.663	1:20.640	+3.658
14	14	(Brazil) Rubens Barrichello	Jordan-Peugeot	1:21.874	1:20.902	+3.920
15	23	(Portugal) Pedro Lamy	Minardi-Ford	1:22.600	1:21.156	+4.174
16	4	(Finland) Mika Salo	Tyrrell-Yamaha	1:24.440	1:21.624	+4.642
17	3	(Japan) Ukyo Katayama	Tyrrell-Yamaha	1:22.866	1:21.702	+4.720
18	10	(Japan) Taki Inoue	Footwork-Hart	1:24.656	1:22.081	+5.099
19	29	(France) Jean-Christophe Boullion	Sauber-Ford	1:22.766	1:22.161	+5.179
20	9	(Italy) Massimiliano Papis	Footwork-Hart	1:23.275	No time	+6.293
21	22	(Brazil) Roberto Moreno	Forti-Ford	1:26.059	1:24.351	+7.369
22	17	(Italy) Andrea Montermini	Pacific-Ford	1:25.465	1:24.371	+7.389
23	21	(Brazil) Pedro Diniz	Forti-Ford	1:25.934	1:24.695	+7.713
24	16	(Italy) Giovanni Lavaggi	Pacific-Ford	1:27.342	1:26.570	+9.588

=== Race ===
Pos	No	Driver	Constructor	Laps	Time/Retired	Grid	Points
1	5	(United Kingdom) Damon Hill	Williams-Renault	77	1:46:25.721	1	10
2	6	(United Kingdom) David Coulthard	Williams-Renault	77	+ 33.398	2	6
3	28	(Austria) Gerhard Berger	Ferrari	76	+ 1 Lap	4	4
4	2	(United Kingdom) Johnny Herbert	Benetton-Renault	76	+ 1 Lap	9	3
5	30	(Germany) Heinz-Harald Frentzen	Sauber-Ford	76	+ 1 Lap	11	2
6	26	(France) Olivier Panis	Ligier-Mugen-Honda	76	+ 1 Lap	10	1
7	14	(Brazil) Rubens Barrichello	Jordan-Peugeot	76	+ 1 Lap	14	
8	24	(Italy) Luca Badoer	Minardi-Ford	75	+ 2 Laps	12	
9	23	(Portugal) Pedro Lamy	Minardi-Ford	74	+ 3 Laps	15	
10	29	(France) Jean-Christophe Boullion	Sauber-Ford	74	+ 3 Laps	19	
11	1	(Germany) Michael Schumacher	Benetton-Renault	73	Fuel pump	3	
12	17	(Italy) Andrea Montermini	Pacific-Ford	73	+ 4 Laps	22	
13	15	(United Kingdom) Eddie Irvine	Jordan-Peugeot	70	Clutch	7	
Ret	25	(United Kingdom) Martin Brundle	Ligier-Mugen-Honda	67	Engine	8	
Ret	4	(Finland) Mika Salo	Tyrrell-Yamaha	58	Throttle	16	
Ret	7	(United Kingdom) Mark Blundell	McLaren-Mercedes	54	Engine	13	
Ret	3	(Japan) Ukyo Katayama	Tyrrell-Yamaha	46	Spun Off	17	
Ret	9	(Italy) Massimiliano Papis	Footwork-Hart	45	Brakes	20	
Ret	27	(France) Jean Alesi	Ferrari	42	Engine	6	
Ret	21	(Brazil) Pedro Diniz	Forti-Ford	32	Engine	23	
Ret	10	(Japan) Taki Inoue	Footwork-Hart	13	Engine	18	
Ret	22	(Brazil) Roberto Moreno	Forti-Ford	8	Gearbox	21	
Ret	16	(Italy) Giovanni Lavaggi	Pacific-Ford	5	Spun Off	24	
Ret	8	(Finland) Mika Häkkinen	McLaren-Mercedes	3	Engine	5	

== Championship standings after the race ==
Drivers' Championship standings

Pos	Driver	Points
1	(Germany) Michael Schumacher	56
2	(United Kingdom) Damon Hill	45
3	(France) Jean Alesi	32
4	(United Kingdom) David Coulthard	29
5	(United Kingdom) Johnny Herbert	28

Constructors' Championship standings

Pos	Constructor	Points
1	(United Kingdom) Benetton-Renault	74
2	(United Kingdom) Williams-Renault	68
3	(Italy) Ferrari	57
4	(Republic of Ireland) Jordan-Peugeot	13
5	(France) Ligier-Mugen-Honda	12

- Note: Only the top five positions are included for both sets of standings.

Previous race: 1995 German Grand Prix	FIA Formula One World Championship; 1995 season	Next race: 1995 Belgian Grand Prix
Previous race: 1994 Hungarian Grand Prix	Hungarian Grand Prix	Next race: 1996 Hungarian Grand Prix
