= Taki Inoue =

Japanese racing driver (born 1963)

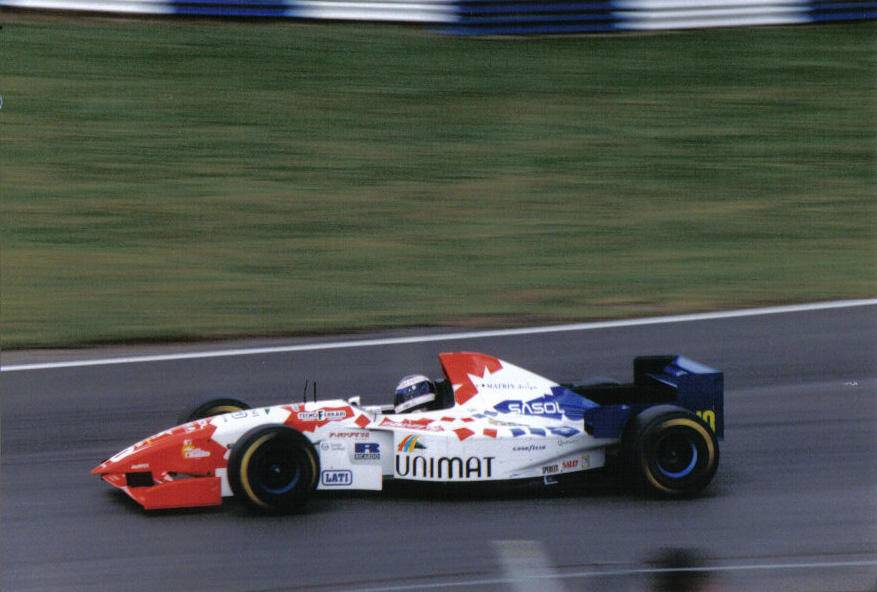
- Inoue at the 1995 British Grand Prix
- Born: 5 September 1963 (age 63); Kobe, Hyōgo, Japan

Formula One World Championship career
- Nationality: (Japan) Japanese
- Active years: 1994–1995
- Team(s): Simtek, Footwork
- Entries: 18
- Championships: 0
- Wins: 0
- Podiums: 0
- Career points: 0
- Pole positions: 0
- Fastest laps: 0
- First entry: 1994 Japanese Grand Prix
- Last entry: 1995 Australian Grand Prix

Takachiho "Taki" Inoue (井上 隆智穂 Inoue Takachiho, born 5 September 1963) is a Japanese former racing driver. He competed in Formula One from 1994 to 1995, driving for Simtek and Footwork Arrows.

== Biography ==
Inoue was born in Kobe. He competed in the British Formula Ford Championship in 1988, followed by a spell in All-Japan Formula Three from 1989 to 1993 and a season in the International Formula 3000 championship in 1994.

=== Formula One ===
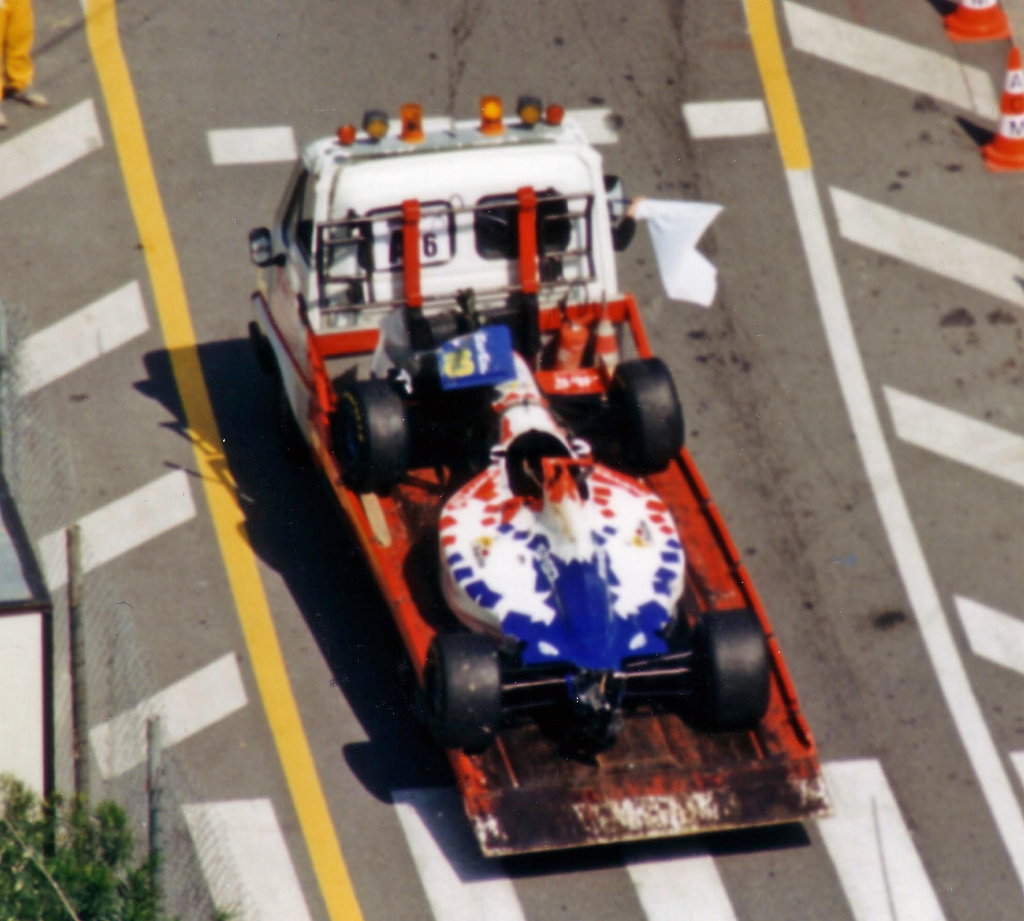
Inoue's damaged car is towed back to the pits after his bizarre practice accident at the 1995 Monaco Grand Prix.

Inoue participated in 18 Formula One Grand Prix races. His first appearance was a one-off race for Simtek at the 1994 Japanese Grand Prix, from which he retired. For the next year he moved to Footwork Arrows. Over the course of his career he scored no championship points. He is perhaps best remembered for two bizarre incidents while driving for Footwork in 1995. The first occurred after a practice session at Monaco, when his stalled car was being towed back to the pits when it was hit by a course car, driven by Jean Ragnotti, causing it to roll into the barriers, although Inoue was fit to race the next day. The second happened on Hungarian GP on live TV worldwide – attempting to assist the marshals in putting out the engine fire which had forced him out of the race, a safety car Tatra 623 driven to the scene by a marshal hit him, injuring his leg, although he recovered for the next race.

For most of the season, Inoue's team-mate was Gianni Morbidelli, but late in the season Max Papis replaced Morbidelli, and was sometimes outpaced by Inoue. Entering the 1996 season, Inoue lobbied Tyrrell for a drive, but the team chose Ukyo Katayama with his Mild Seven sponsorship money from Japan Tobacco. Instead, he was announced in January to drive for the Minardi team. However, one of his personal sponsors pulled out at the last minute and Inoue withdrew from F1. Minardi took on Giancarlo Fisichella instead. Fisichella, the team's test driver in 1995, had backing from Marlboro Italy.

With his sponsorship reduced, Inoue was out of a drive in Formula One. After a brief switch to sportscars, he retired from racing at the end of 1999 and now manages drivers in his own country. He is also known for his self-deprecating humour, as Inoue publicly proclaimed himself as the "worst driver in Formula One", admitted that he initially had no idea what a pit stop was, and in an interview with the Top Gear magazine in 2015 stated that he was "not good enough to drive in F1". In another instance, after Nico Rosberg's retirement at the end of 2016, Inoue put out a tongue-in-cheek advertisement as a replacement driver on Twitter detailing his F1 antics which gained notable traction on social media, as have other tweets since.

== Racing record ==
=== Career summary ===
Season	Series	Team	Races	Wins	Poles	F/Laps	Podiums	Points	Position
1990	Japanese Formula 3	Phoenix Racing Team With Plus B	3	0	0	0	0	0	NC
1991	Japanese Formula 3	Dallara Japan Racing	9	0	0	0	0	0	NC
1992	Japanese Formula 3	Super Nova Racing	11	0	0	0	0	5	10th
1993	Japanese Formula 3	Super Nova Racing	11	0	0	0	0	6	9th
1994	International Formula 3000	Super Nova Racing	8	0	0	0	0	0	NC
1994	Formula One	MTV Simtek Ford	1	0	0	0	0	0	NC
1995	Formula One	Footwork Hart	17	0	0	0	0	0	NC
1996	BPR Global GT Series	Konrad Motorsport	1	0	0	0	0	0	NC
1999	All Japan Grand Touring Car Championship	Club: Yellow Magic	4	0	0	0	0	3	32nd

=== Complete International Formula 3000 results ===
(key) (Races in bold indicate pole position; races in italics indicate fastest lap.)

Year	Entrant	1	2	3	4	5	6	7	8	DC	Points
1994	Super Nova Racing	SIL; 15	PAU; Ret	CAT; 13	PER; 13	HOC; 12	SPA; 14	EST; 9	MAG; Ret	NC	0

=== Complete Formula One results ===
(key)

Year	Entrant	Chassis	Engine	1	2	3	4	5	6	7	8	9	10	11	12	13	14	15	16	17	WDC	Points
1994	MTV Simtek Ford	Simtek S941	Ford V8	BRA	PAC	SMR	MON	ESP	CAN	FRA	GBR	GER	HUN	BEL	ITA	POR	EUR	JPN; Ret	AUS		NC	0
1995	Footwork Hart	Footwork FA16	Hart V8	BRA; Ret	ARG; Ret	SMR; Ret	ESP; Ret	MON; Ret	CAN; 9	FRA; Ret	GBR; Ret	GER; Ret	HUN; Ret	BEL; 12	ITA; 8	POR; 15	EUR; Ret	PAC; Ret	JPN; 12	AUS; Ret	NC	0

=== Complete JGTC results ===
Year	Team	Car	Class	1	2	3	4	5	6	7	DC	Points
1999	Club: Yellow Magic	Ferrari F355 GT	GT300	SUZ	FUJ; 8	SUG; Ret	MIN	FUJ; 12	TAI	MOT; Ret	32nd	3
