= 1996 European Grand Prix =

Race 4 of 16 in the 1996 Formula One World Championship
← Previous race	Next race →
- The Nürburgring in its 1996 configuration

Race details
- Date: 28 April 1996
- Official name: XL Grand Prix of Europe
- Location: Nürburgring; Nürburg, Rhineland-Palatinate, Germany
- Course: Permanent racing facility
- Course length: 4.556 km (2.842 miles)
- Distance: 67 laps, 305.252 km (190.425 miles)
- Weather: Cloudy, but dry

Pole position
Driver	(United Kingdom) Damon Hill	Williams-Renault
- Time: 1:18.941

Fastest lap
Driver	(United Kingdom) Damon Hill	Williams-Renault
- Time: 1:21.363 on lap 55

Podium
First	(Canada) Jacques Villeneuve	Williams-Renault
Second	(Germany) Michael Schumacher	Ferrari
Third	(United Kingdom) David Coulthard	McLaren-Mercedes

The 1996 European Grand Prix was a Formula One motor race held at the Nürburgring in Germany on 28 April 1996. It was the fourth race of the 1996 Formula One World Championship.

The 67-lap race was won by Jacques Villeneuve, driving a Williams-Renault. Villeneuve beat teammate and pole-sitter Damon Hill off the line and led all 67 laps, taking his first F1 victory in only his fourth race. Local driver Michael Schumacher finished second in his Ferrari, with David Coulthard a distant third in a McLaren-Mercedes, just ahead of Hill.

Both Benetton cars made extremely slow starts, due to the brakes locking on. Berger was forced to pit for fresh tyres after a flat-spot was caused, while Alesi finished lap 1 in 13th place and spun while trying to recover.

The Tyrrells were disqualified for separate infringements - Salo finished 10th but his car was found post-race to be underweight, while Katayama finished 12th but was disqualified for having received an illegal push-start on the parade lap.

== Classification ==
=== Qualifying ===
Pos	No	Driver	Constructor	Time	Gap
1	5	(United Kingdom) Damon Hill	Williams-Renault	1:18.941	
2	6	(Canada) Jacques Villeneuve	Williams-Renault	1:19.721	+0.780
3	1	(Germany) Michael Schumacher	Ferrari	1:20.149	+1.208
4	3	(France) Jean Alesi	Benetton-Renault	1:20.711	+1.770
5	11	(Brazil) Rubens Barrichello	Jordan-Peugeot	1:20.818	+1.877
6	8	(United Kingdom) David Coulthard	McLaren-Mercedes	1:20.888	+1.947
7	2	(United Kingdom) Eddie Irvine	Ferrari	1:20.931	+1.990
8	4	(Austria) Gerhard Berger	Benetton-Renault	1:21.054	+2.113
9	7	(Finland) Mika Häkkinen	McLaren-Mercedes	1:21.078	+2.137
10	15	(Germany) Heinz-Harald Frentzen	Sauber-Ford	1:21.113	+2.172
11	12	(United Kingdom) Martin Brundle	Jordan-Peugeot	1:21.177	+2.236
12	14	(United Kingdom) Johnny Herbert	Sauber-Ford	1:21.210	+2.269
13	17	(Netherlands) Jos Verstappen	Footwork-Hart	1:21.367	+2.426
14	19	(Finland) Mika Salo	Tyrrell-Yamaha	1:21.458	+2.517
15	9	(France) Olivier Panis	Ligier-Mugen-Honda	1:21.509	+2.568
16	18	(Japan) Ukyo Katayama	Tyrrell-Yamaha	1:21.812	+2.871
17	10	(Brazil) Pedro Diniz	Ligier-Mugen-Honda	1:22.733	+3.792
18	21	(Italy) Giancarlo Fisichella	Minardi-Ford	1:22.921	+3.980
19	20	(Portugal) Pedro Lamy	Minardi-Ford	1:23.139	+4.198
20	16	(Brazil) Ricardo Rosset	Footwork-Hart	1:23.620	+4.679
107% time: 1:24.467
DNQ	23	(Italy) Andrea Montermini	Forti-Ford	1:25.053	+6.112
DNQ	22	(Italy) Luca Badoer	Forti-Ford	1:25.840	+6.899

=== Race ===
Pos	No	Driver	Constructor	Laps	Time/Retired	Grid	Points
1	6	(Canada) Jacques Villeneuve	Williams-Renault	67	1:33:26.473	2	10
2	1	(Germany) Michael Schumacher	Ferrari	67	+ 0.762	3	6
3	8	(United Kingdom) David Coulthard	McLaren-Mercedes	67	+ 32.834	6	4
4	5	(United Kingdom) Damon Hill	Williams-Renault	67	+ 33.511	1	3
5	11	(Brazil) Rubens Barrichello	Jordan-Peugeot	67	+ 33.713	5	2
6	12	(United Kingdom) Martin Brundle	Jordan-Peugeot	67	+ 55.567	11	1
7	14	(United Kingdom) Johnny Herbert	Sauber-Ford	67	+ 1:18.027	12	
8	7	(Finland) Mika Häkkinen	McLaren-Mercedes	67	+ 1:18.438	9	
9	4	(Austria) Gerhard Berger	Benetton-Renault	67	+ 1:21.061	8	
10	10	(Brazil) Pedro Diniz	Ligier-Mugen-Honda	66	+ 1 Lap	17	
11	16	(Brazil) Ricardo Rosset	Footwork-Hart	65	+ 2 Laps	20	
12	20	(Portugal) Pedro Lamy	Minardi-Ford	65	+ 2 Laps	19	
13	21	(Italy) Giancarlo Fisichella	Minardi-Ford	65	+ 2 Laps	18	
Ret	15	(Germany) Heinz-Harald Frentzen	Sauber-Ford	59	Brakes	10	
Ret	17	(Netherlands) Jos Verstappen	Footwork-Hart	38	Engine	13	
Ret	9	(France) Olivier Panis	Ligier-Mugen-Honda	6	Collision	15	
Ret	2	(United Kingdom) Eddie Irvine	Ferrari	6	Collision	7	
Ret	3	(France) Jean Alesi	Benetton-Renault	1	Collision	4	
DSQ	19	(Finland) Mika Salo	Tyrrell-Yamaha	66	Underweight	14	
DSQ	18	(Japan) Ukyo Katayama	Tyrrell-Yamaha	65	Push Start	16	

== Notes ==
- Both of Mika Häkkinen's pit lane speeding penalties in this race were caused by a problem with his pit speed limiter.

== Championship standings after the race ==
Drivers' Championship standings

Pos	Driver	Points
1	(United Kingdom) Damon Hill	33
2	(Canada) Jacques Villeneuve	22
3	(France) Jean Alesi	10
4	(Germany) Michael Schumacher	10
5	(United Kingdom) Eddie Irvine	6

Constructors' Championship standings

Pos	Constructor	Points
1	(United Kingdom) Williams-Renault	55
2	(Italy) Ferrari	16
3	(Italy) Benetton-Renault	13
4	(United Kingdom) McLaren-Mercedes	9
5	(Republic of Ireland) Jordan-Peugeot	6

- Note: Only the top five positions are included for both sets of standings.

Previous race: 1996 Argentine Grand Prix	FIA Formula One World Championship; 1996 season	Next race: 1996 San Marino Grand Prix
Previous race: 1995 European Grand Prix	European Grand Prix	Next race: 1997 European Grand Prix; Next race at the Nürburgring: 1997 Luxembourg Grand Prix
