= 1995 Belgian Grand Prix =

Race 11 of 17 in the 1995 Formula One World Championship
← Previous race	Next race →
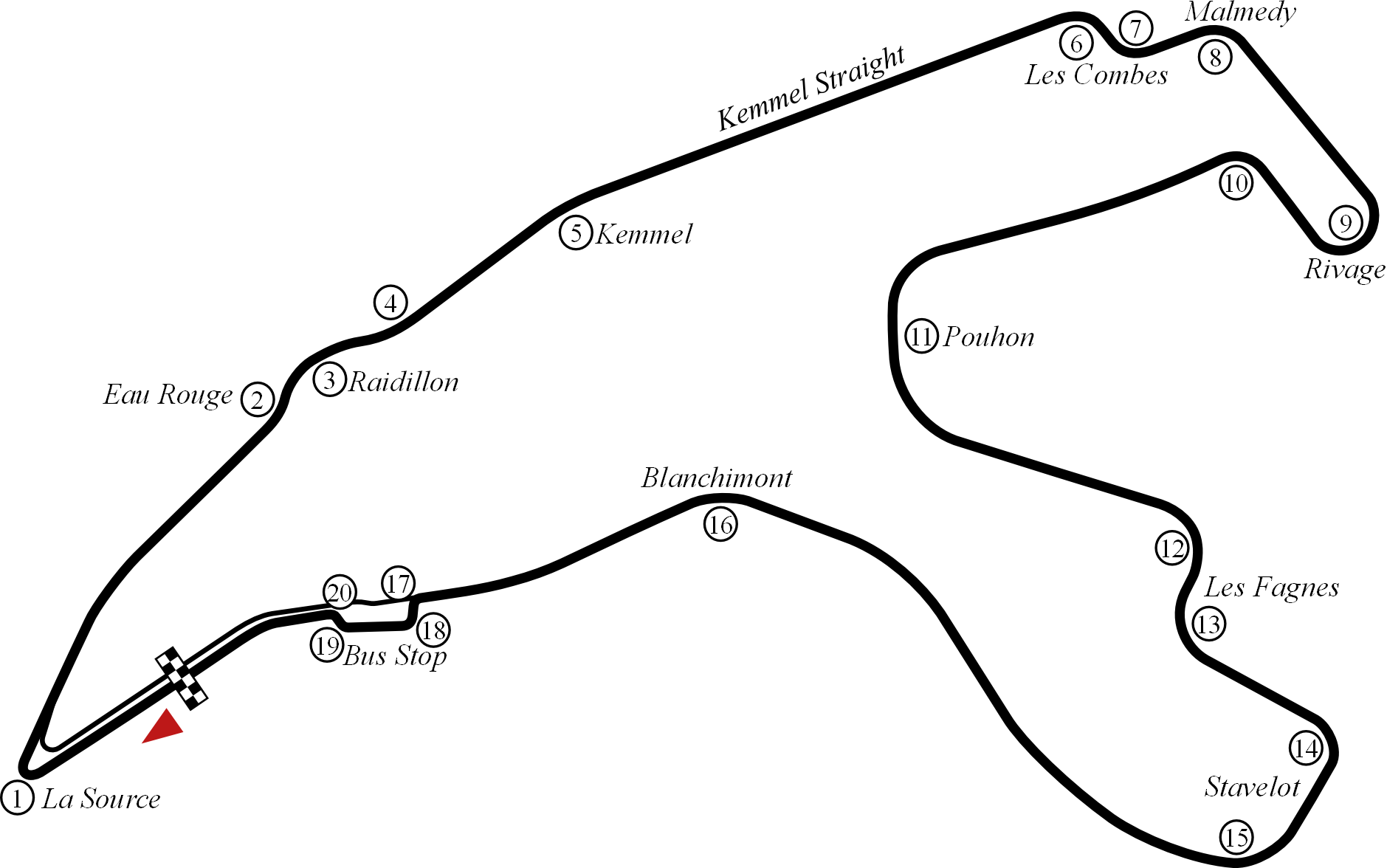

Race details
- Date: 27 August 1995
- Official name: LIII Grand Prix de Belgique
- Location: Circuit de Spa-Francorchamps; Francorchamps, Wallonia, Belgium
- Course: Permanent racing facility
- Course length: 6.968 km (4.330 miles)
- Distance: 44 laps, 306.856 km (191.785 miles)
- Weather: Cloudy, then heavy rain

Pole position
Driver	(Austria) Gerhard Berger	Ferrari
- Time: 1:54.392

Fastest lap
Driver	(United Kingdom) David Coulthard	Williams-Renault
- Time: 1:53.412 on lap 11

Podium
First	(Germany) Michael Schumacher	Benetton-Renault
Second	(United Kingdom) Damon Hill	Williams-Renault
Third	(United Kingdom) Martin Brundle	Ligier Mugen-Honda

The 1995 Belgian Grand Prix was a Formula One motor race held on 27 August 1995 at the Circuit de Spa-Francorchamps, near the village of Francorchamps, Wallonia. It was the eleventh race of the 1995 Formula One World Championship.

The 44-lap race was won by Michael Schumacher, driving a Benetton-Renault. Despite qualifying only 16th, Schumacher took his sixth victory of the season after an intense battle with Damon Hill in the Williams-Renault. Hill settled for second, with Martin Brundle third in a Ligier-Mugen-Honda, which would be his last podium finish.

== Race report ==
The race was attended by in excess of 100,000 people. Schumacher and Hill both qualified further down the grid than usual in a wet-dry qualifying session, but fought back during the race. Both Jean Alesi and Johnny Herbert briefly led the race, but Alesi broke down and Herbert struggled for pace once the track was dry. Polesitter Gerhard Berger struggled before dropping out.

David Coulthard pulled away at the front for Williams before suffering a gearbox problem, leaving Hill to lead the race. When Hill made his first pit stop for fresh slick tyres, Schumacher took over at the head of the field. It then started to rain and while Hill went back to the pits for wet weather tyres, Schumacher stayed out on his dry weather slicks. The Williams driver rapidly caught up with the German, but despite lapping six seconds a lap slower, Schumacher was able to keep Hill behind him until he went off the wet track and Hill passed him. Almost immediately the changing track conditions began to favour slicks once more and Schumacher re-passed Hill who pitted again, this time for slicks.

The rain intensified again and the field levelled out when the safety car appeared. Both drivers pitted for wets and returned to the track with Schumacher narrowly ahead of Hill. This appeared to set the two title rivals up for a battle for the lead going into the last ten laps, but Hill then had to pit again to serve a ten-second stop-go penalty for pit lane speeding, a penalty he served with six laps to go, and which put him down to third. Hill recovered to pass Martin Brundle on the Kemmel straight on the final lap to regain second place.

Schumacher's performance did not impress Hill after his defensive moves forced Hill to either back off or go off the track. Schumacher claimed that he had only blocked Hill at the low-speed corners, but video evidence suggested that Schumacher had blocked Hill on some of the high speed corners, such as the Radillion and Blanchimont. Hill later commented that "We (he and Schumacher) had some pretty hairy moments and I am not satisfied with being driven into; I don't think that was acceptable. That is all well and good but if it was meant on purpose I would be very upset, F1 cars are not go-karts. I think there are some things which are acceptable and some things which are not." Schumacher defended himself by agreeing that touching wheels in high-speed corners is "not acceptable" but added that at the speed he and Hill were doing, he thought it was acceptable. Schumacher was given a one-race suspended ban for driving aggressively in order to stop Hill from passing.

== Classification ==
=== Qualifying ===
Pos	No	Driver	Constructor	Q1	Q2	Gap
1	28	(Austria) Gerhard Berger	Ferrari	2:14.744	1:54.392	—
2	27	(France) Jean Alesi	Ferrari	2:15.077	1:54.631	+0.239
3	8	(Finland) Mika Häkkinen	McLaren-Mercedes	2:15.848	1:55.435	+1.043
4	2	(United Kingdom) Johnny Herbert	Benetton-Renault	—	1:56.085	+1.693
5	6	(United Kingdom) David Coulthard	Williams-Renault	2:15.232	1:56.254	+1.862
6	7	(United Kingdom) Mark Blundell	McLaren-Mercedes	2:18.136	1:56.622	+2.230
7	15	(United Kingdom) Eddie Irvine	Jordan-Peugeot	2:16.540	1:57.001	+2.609
8	5	(United Kingdom) Damon Hill	Williams-Renault	2:15.143	1:57.768	+3.376
9	26	(France) Olivier Panis	Ligier-Mugen-Honda	2:17.579	1:58.021	+3.629
10	30	(Germany) Heinz-Harald Frentzen	Sauber-Ford	2:15.533	1:58.148	+3.756
11	4	(Finland) Mika Salo	Tyrrell-Yamaha	2:18.104	1:58.224	+3.832
12	14	(Brazil) Rubens Barrichello	Jordan-Peugeot	2:17.144	1:58.293	+3.901
13	25	(United Kingdom) Martin Brundle	Ligier-Mugen-Honda	2:17.207	1:58.314	+3.922
14	29	(France) Jean-Christophe Boullion	Sauber-Ford	2:17.406	1:58.356	+3.964
15	3	(Japan) Ukyo Katayama	Tyrrell-Yamaha	2:18.194	1:58.551	+4.159
16	1	(Germany) Michael Schumacher	Benetton-Renault	2:14.962	1:59.079	+4.687
17	23	(Portugal) Pedro Lamy	Minardi-Ford	2:18.547	1:59.256	+4.864
18	10	(Japan) Taki Inoue	Footwork-Hart	2:23.311	2:00.990	+6.598
19	24	(Italy) Luca Badoer	Minardi-Ford	2:17.335	2:01.013	+6.621
20	9	(Italy) Massimiliano Papis	Footwork-Hart	2:19.300	2:01.685	+7.293
21	17	(Italy) Andrea Montermini	Pacific-Ford	2:25.291	2:02.405	+8.013
22	22	(Brazil) Roberto Moreno	Forti-Ford	2:23.417	2:03.817	+9.425
23	16	(Italy) Giovanni Lavaggi	Pacific-Ford	2:26.311	2:06.407	+12.015
24	21	(Brazil) Pedro Diniz	Forti-Ford	2:25.699	2:09.537	+15.145

=== Race ===
Pos	No	Driver	Constructor	Laps	Time/Retired	Grid	Points
1	1	(Germany) Michael Schumacher	Benetton-Renault	44	1:36:47.875	16	10
2	5	(United Kingdom) Damon Hill	Williams-Renault	44	+ 19.493	8	6
3	25	(United Kingdom) Martin Brundle	Ligier-Mugen-Honda	44	+ 24.998	13	4
4	30	(Germany) Heinz-Harald Frentzen	Sauber-Ford	44	+ 26.972	10	3
5	7	(United Kingdom) Mark Blundell	McLaren-Mercedes	44	+ 33.772	6	2
6	14	(Brazil) Rubens Barrichello	Jordan-Peugeot	44	+ 39.674	12	1
7	2	(United Kingdom) Johnny Herbert	Benetton-Renault	44	+ 54.043	4	
8	4	(Finland) Mika Salo	Tyrrell-Yamaha	44	+ 54.548	11	
9	26	(France) Olivier Panis	Ligier-Mugen-Honda	44	+ 1:06.170	9	
10	23	(Portugal) Pedro Lamy	Minardi-Ford	44	+ 1:19.789	17	
11	29	(France) Jean-Christophe Boullion	Sauber-Ford	43	+ 1 lap	14	
12	10	(Japan) Taki Inoue	Footwork-Hart	43	+ 1 lap	18	
13	21	(Brazil) Pedro Diniz	Forti-Ford	42	+ 2 laps	24	
14	22	(Brazil) Roberto Moreno	Forti-Ford	42	+ 2 laps	22	
Ret	3	(Japan) Ukyo Katayama	Tyrrell-Yamaha	28	Spun off	15	
Ret	16	(Italy) Giovanni Lavaggi	Pacific-Ford	27	Gearbox	23	
Ret	24	(Italy) Luca Badoer	Minardi-Ford	23	Accident	19	
Ret	28	(Austria) Gerhard Berger	Ferrari	22	Electrical	1	
Ret	15	(United Kingdom) Eddie Irvine	Jordan-Peugeot	21	Fire	7	
Ret	9	(Italy) Massimiliano Papis	Footwork-Hart	20	Spun off	20	
Ret	17	(Italy) Andrea Montermini	Pacific-Ford	18	Out of fuel	21	
Ret	6	(United Kingdom) David Coulthard	Williams-Renault	13	Gearbox	5	
Ret	27	(France) Jean Alesi	Ferrari	4	Suspension	2	
Ret	8	(Finland) Mika Häkkinen	McLaren-Mercedes	1	Spun off	3	

== Championship standings after the race ==
Drivers' Championship standings

Pos	Driver	Points
1	(Germany) Michael Schumacher	66
2	(United Kingdom) Damon Hill	51
3	(France) Jean Alesi	32
4	(United Kingdom) David Coulthard	29
5	(United Kingdom) Johnny Herbert	28

Constructors' Championship standings

Pos	Constructor	Points
1	(United Kingdom) Benetton-Renault	84
2	(United Kingdom) Williams-Renault	74
3	(Italy) Ferrari	57
4	(France) Ligier-Mugen-Honda	16
5	(Republic of Ireland) Jordan-Peugeot	14

- Note: Only the top five positions are included for both sets of standings.

Previous race: 1995 Hungarian Grand Prix	FIA Formula One World Championship; 1995 season	Next race: 1995 Italian Grand Prix
Previous race: 1994 Belgian Grand Prix	Belgian Grand Prix	Next race: 1996 Belgian Grand Prix
