= 1995 German Grand Prix =

9th round of the 1995 Formula One season

Race 9 of 17 in the 1995 Formula One World Championship
← Previous race	Next race →

Race details
- Date: 30 July 1995
- Official name: XXIV Grosser Mobil 1 Preis von Deutschland
- Location: Hockenheimring; Hockenheim, Baden-Württemberg, Germany
- Course: Permanent racing facility
- Course length: 6.823 km (4.264 miles)
- Distance: 45 laps, 307.035 km (191.896 miles)
- Weather: Sunny, 28 °C (82 °F)

Pole position
Driver	(United Kingdom) Damon Hill	Williams-Renault
- Time: 1:44.385

Fastest lap
Driver	(Germany) Michael Schumacher	Benetton-Renault
- Time: 1:48.824 on lap 22

Podium
First	(Germany) Michael Schumacher	Benetton-Renault
Second	(United Kingdom) David Coulthard	Williams-Renault
Third	(Austria) Gerhard Berger	Ferrari

The 1995 German Grand Prix (formally the XXIV Grosser Mobil 1 Preis von Deutschland) was a Formula One motor race held at the Hockenheimring, Hockenheim on 30 July 1995. It was the ninth race of the 1995 Formula One World Championship.

The 45-lap race was won by local driver Michael Schumacher, driving a Benetton-Renault, after he started from second position. Briton Damon Hill took pole position in his Williams-Renault, but spun off on lap 2 as a result of a driveshaft failure. Hill's compatriot and teammate David Coulthard finished second, with Austrian Gerhard Berger third in a Ferrari.

With the win, his fifth of the season, Schumacher extended his lead over Hill in the Drivers' Championship to 21 points.

== Summary ==
Damon Hill started the race from the pole position alongside Michael Schumacher. After making a good start, Hill spun on entry to the first corner on the 2nd lap sending his car across a gravel trap and into a tyre barrier, ending his race. A driveshaft failure caused Hill's Williams to lock its rear wheels and initiated his spin off the track.

Schumacher was left leading David Coulthard and Gerhard Berger, who was given a 10-second stop-and-go penalty for jumping the start of the race. The penalty dropped Berger to 14th position though he fought back to finish back in 3rd place. Berger denied jumping the start, claiming that though his car did move slightly when he put it into gear, it was stationary when the green light came on to start the race.

Benetton's 2-stop strategy for Schumacher prevailed over the 1-stop strategy Coulthard was on, as Schumacher pulled away from the field giving himself enough room to make his second pit stop and remain in the lead. Schumacher became the first German to win a World Championship German Grand Prix (other German drivers had won the German Grand Prix before the inception of the World Championship, the most recent being Rudolf Caracciola in 1939). His car broke down after the race had finished, as did that of team-mate Johnny Herbert and Aguri Suzuki (whose car caught fire).

Initially it was believed that Hill spun off due to oil laid down on the track from overfull oil tanks – as it is common practice for teams to fill the oil tanks prior to the start of the race. A few days after the race, the Williams team discovered that Hill's car had in fact suffered from a driveshaft failure leading to his accident. Shortly before he went off, Murray Walker commented that he had noticed blue smoke coming out of the back of Hill's car; the reason for this was never discovered.

It was the final F1 race of Pierluigi Martini, who retired with a blown engine and was replaced by Pedro Lamy for the next race.

== Classification ==
=== Qualifying ===
Pos	No	Driver	Constructor	Q1 Time	Q2 Time	Gap
1	5	(United Kingdom) Damon Hill	Williams-Renault	1:44.932	1:44.385	
2	1	(Germany) Michael Schumacher	Benetton-Renault	1:45.505	1:44.465	+0.080
3	6	(United Kingdom) David Coulthard	Williams-Renault	1:45.306	1:44.540	+0.155
4	28	(Austria) Gerhard Berger	Ferrari	1:46.482	1:45.553	+1.168
5	14	(Brazil) Rubens Barrichello	Jordan-Peugeot	1:48.203	1:45.765	+1.380
6	15	(United Kingdom) Eddie Irvine	Jordan-Peugeot	1:46.916	1:45.846	+1.461
7	8	(Finland) Mika Häkkinen	McLaren-Mercedes	1:46.291	1:45.849	+1.464
8	7	(United Kingdom) Mark Blundell	McLaren-Mercedes	1:47.854	1:46.221	+1.836
9	2	(United Kingdom) Johnny Herbert	Benetton-Renault	1:46.381	1:46.315	+1.930
10	27	(France) Jean Alesi	Ferrari	1:46.356	1:46.475	+1.971
11	30	(Germany) Heinz-Harald Frentzen	Sauber-Ford	1:47.769	1:46.801	+2.416
12	26	(France) Olivier Panis	Ligier-Mugen-Honda	1:47.372	1:47.528	+2.987
13	4	(Finland) Mika Salo	Tyrrell-Yamaha	1:49.103	1:47.507	+3.122
14	29	(France) Jean-Christophe Boullion	Sauber-Ford	1:48.526	1:47.636	+3.251
15	9	(Italy) Massimiliano Papis	Footwork-Hart	1:49.621	1:48.093	+3.708
16	24	(Italy) Luca Badoer	Minardi-Ford	1:50.409	1:49.302	+4.917
17	3	(Japan) Ukyo Katayama	Tyrrell-Yamaha	1:56.518	1:49.402	+5.017
18	25	(Japan) Aguri Suzuki	Ligier-Mugen-Honda	2:04.193	1:49.716	+5.331
19	10	(Japan) Taki Inoue	Footwork-Hart	1:50.451	1:49.892	+5.507
20	23	(Italy) Pierluigi Martini	Minardi-Ford	1:51.368	1:49.990	+5.605
21	21	(Brazil) Pedro Diniz	Forti-Ford	1:54.303	1:52.961	+8.576
22	22	(Brazil) Roberto Moreno	Forti-Ford	1:53.456	1:53.405	+9.020
23	17	(Italy) Andrea Montermini	Pacific-Ford	1:53.492	No time	+9.107
24	16	(Italy) Giovanni Lavaggi	Pacific-Ford	1:54.625	1:56.325	+10.240

=== Race ===
Pos	No	Driver	Constructor	Laps	Time/Retired	Grid	Points
1	1	(Germany) Michael Schumacher	Benetton-Renault	45	1:22:56.043	2	10
2	6	(United Kingdom) David Coulthard	Williams-Renault	45	+ 5.988	3	6
3	28	(Austria) Gerhard Berger	Ferrari	45	+ 1:08.097	4	4
4	2	(United Kingdom) Johnny Herbert	Benetton-Renault	45	+ 1:23.436	9	3
5	29	(France) Jean-Christophe Boullion	Sauber-Ford	44	+ 1 lap	14	2
6	25	(Japan) Aguri Suzuki	Ligier-Mugen-Honda	44	+ 1 lap	18	1
7	3	(Japan) Ukyo Katayama	Tyrrell-Yamaha	44	+ 1 lap	17	
8	17	(Italy) Andrea Montermini	Pacific-Ford	42	+ 3 laps	23	
9	15	(United Kingdom) Eddie Irvine	Jordan-Peugeot	41	Throttle	6	
Ret	8	(Finland) Mika Häkkinen	McLaren-Mercedes	33	Engine	7	
Ret	30	(Germany) Heinz-Harald Frentzen	Sauber-Ford	32	Engine	11	
Ret	24	(Italy) Luca Badoer	Minardi-Ford	28	Oil leak	16	
Ret	16	(Italy) Giovanni Lavaggi	Pacific-Ford	27	Gearbox	24	
Ret	22	(Brazil) Roberto Moreno	Forti-Ford	27	Halfshaft	22	
Ret	14	(Brazil) Rubens Barrichello	Jordan-Peugeot	20	Engine	5	
Ret	7	(United Kingdom) Mark Blundell	McLaren-Mercedes	17	Engine	8	
Ret	26	(France) Olivier Panis	Ligier-Mugen-Honda	13	Water leak	12	
Ret	27	(France) Jean Alesi	Ferrari	12	Engine	10	
Ret	23	(Italy) Pierluigi Martini	Minardi-Ford	11	Engine	20	
Ret	10	(Japan) Taki Inoue	Footwork-Hart	9	Gearbox	19	
Ret	21	(Brazil) Pedro Diniz	Forti-Ford	8	Brakes	21	
Ret	5	(United Kingdom) Damon Hill	Williams-Renault	1	Driveshaft/spun off	1	
Ret	4	(Finland) Mika Salo	Tyrrell-Yamaha	0	Clutch	13	
Ret	9	(Italy) Massimiliano Papis	Footwork-Hart	0	Gearbox	15	

== Championship standings after the race ==
Drivers' Championship standings

Pos	Driver	Points
1	(Germany) Michael Schumacher	56
2	(United Kingdom) Damon Hill	35
3	(France) Jean Alesi	32
4	(United Kingdom) Johnny Herbert	25
5	(United Kingdom) David Coulthard	23

Constructors' Championship standings

Pos	Constructor	Points
1	(United Kingdom) Benetton-Renault	71
2	(Italy) Ferrari	53
3	(United Kingdom) Williams-Renault	52
4	(Republic of Ireland) Jordan-Peugeot	13
5	(France) Ligier-Mugen-Honda	11

- Note: Only the top five positions are included for both sets of standings.

Previous race: 1995 British Grand Prix	FIA Formula One World Championship; 1995 season	Next race: 1995 Hungarian Grand Prix
Previous race: 1994 German Grand Prix	German Grand Prix	Next race: 1996 German Grand Prix
