= Footwork Arrows =

Formula One motor racing team, competing during the mid-1990s

Footwork
- Full name: Footwork Arrows
- Base: Milton Keynes, United Kingdom
- Noted staff: Jackie Oliver; Alan Jenkins
- Noted drivers: (Italy) Michele Alboreto (Brazil) Christian Fittipaldi (Italy) Gianni Morbidelli (Japan) Aguri Suzuki (Japan) Taki Inoue (Brazil) Ricardo Rosset (Netherlands) Jos Verstappen

Formula One World Championship career
- First entry: 1991 United States Grand Prix
- Races entered: 97 (91 starts)
- Constructors' Championships: 0
- Drivers' Championships: 0
- Race victories: 0
- Podiums: 1
- Pole positions: 0
- Fastest laps: 0
- Final entry: 1996 Japanese Grand Prix

Footwork Arrows was a British Formula One motor racing team which competed from 1991 to 1996. Japanese businessman Wataru Ohashi, who was the president of Footwork Express Co., Ltd., a Japanese logistics company, began investing heavily in the Arrows team in 1990 (having sponsored a Japanese Formula 3000 team), the deal including requiring the cars to display the Footwork logo prominently. The team was officially renamed Footwork in 1991, and secured a deal to race with Porsche engines. Results were poorer than expected, and after just six races, Footwork dropped the Porsche engines and continued with Hart-built Ford engines.

For the 1992 season they switched engine supplier to Mugen. Arrows retained the Footwork name until Ohashi withdrew his financial backing before the 1996 season, whereupon the name of the team reverted to Arrows. Regardless, Jackie Oliver had retained operational control throughout the entire period.

The team also participated in the Japanese Formula 3000 Championship under the Footwork Sports Racing Team name, winning the championship in 1988 with Aguri Suzuki.

== Team history ==
=== 1991 ===
Arrows was officially renamed Footwork for 1991. The season began with the A11C chassis with Porsche engines, but after neither Michele Alboreto or Alex Caffi qualified in Brazil there was a reshuffle with Alan Rees being made financial director and John Wickham named team manager. The prototype FA12 appeared but was then destroyed when its suspension failed at the notorious Tamburello turn at Imola. Alboreto suffered a broken foot which required several stitches and Caffi damaged a second new car at Monaco. Caffi was then hurt in a road accident a week later, and was replaced by Stefan Johansson for several races.

In June the team decided to replace the unsuccessful Porsche engines with Hart-prepared Cosworth DFR engines. Having failed to score points for a year the team was forced to pre-qualify from the half-way point of the season and appeared in the races only rarely in the second part of the year. Despite the problems the team opened a 40%-scale windtunnel at Milton Keynes.

=== 1992 ===
For 1992, Caffi was dropped and Aguri Suzuki joined, bringing a supply of Mugen V10s (derived from the 1990-spec Honda V10s that Mugen serviced for Tyrrell the previous year). The FA13 chassis, designed by Alan Jenkins, was a conventional, straightforward car and Alboreto scored four times, 5th in both the Spanish and San Marino Grands Prix and 6th in both the Brazilian and Portuguese Grands Prix, the team finishing with six points and equal 7th with Ligier in the Constructors' Championship.

=== 1993 ===
For 1993, Alboreto was dropped to make way for Derek Warwick who joined Suzuki with Mugen engines and a new FA14 chassis. It was a disappointing year, however. Warwick scored all the four points with a 6th place in the 1993 British Grand Prix and a 4th in the 1993 Hungarian Grand Prix, which remained the best Footwork result in history until late 1995. The team finished 9th in the Constructors' Championship with four points. At the end of the season Ohashi withdrew his sponsorship, but continued to maintain shares in the team. The team lost its Mugen engines as a result, and had to return to Ford V8s for 1994.

=== 1994 ===
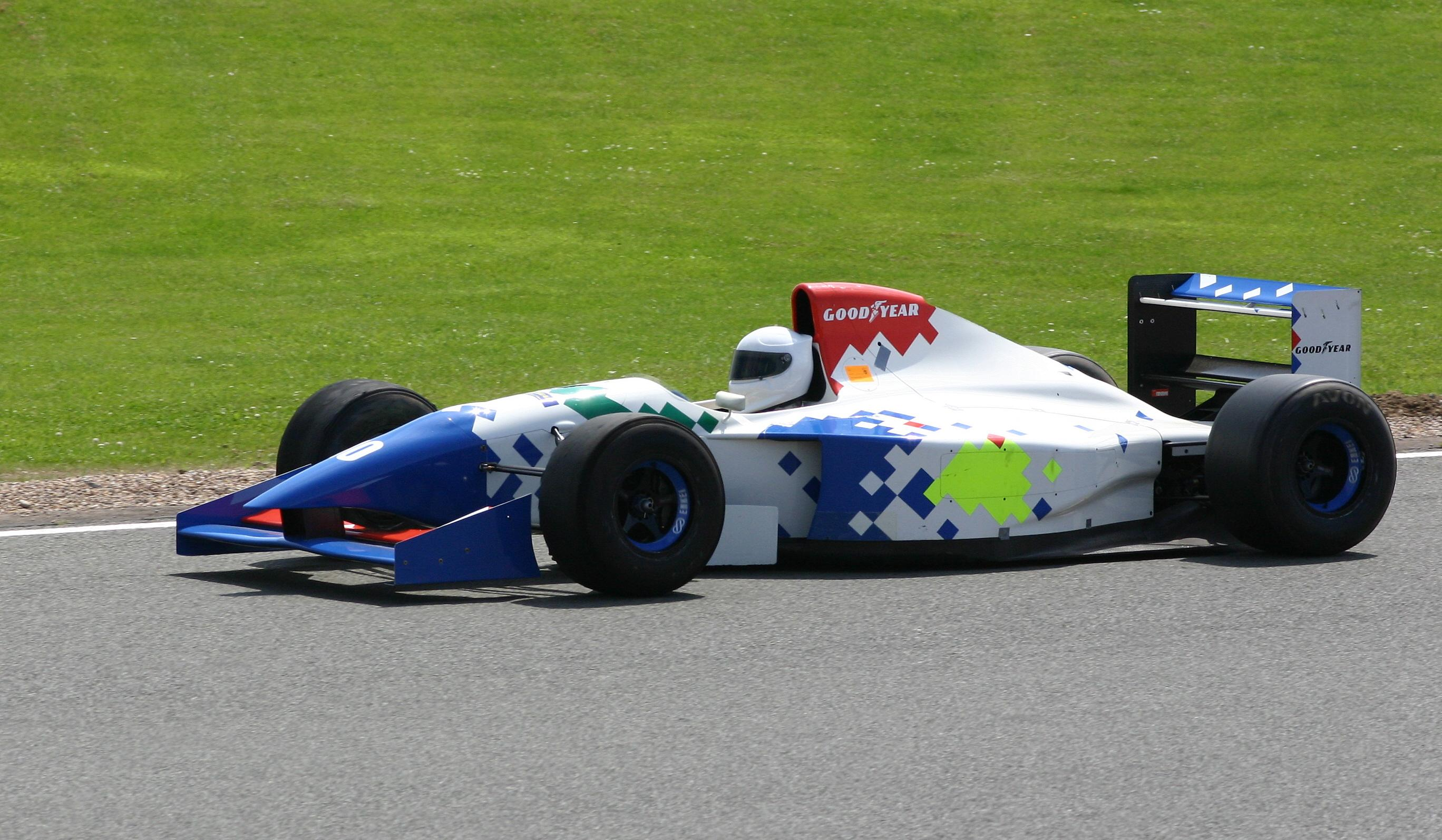
The team's FA15 chassis at the 2008 Silverstone Classic event

Although the Footwork logos were gone from the cars, the team continued to be recognised as Footwork by the FIA, as Ohashi still owned shares in the team and as such did not apply for a name change until 1997. For 1994, Jenkins designed the Footwork FA15 for young drivers Gianni Morbidelli and Christian Fittipaldi but money was short. The neat car drew a number of admiring glances, with Fittipaldi taking 4th place at the Pacific Grand Prix, before being one of the stars of the Monaco Grand Prix, running third at one point until his gearbox failed. Initially the car was fragile, but just as the team began to solve the problems, the revised regulations that followed the deaths of Roland Ratzenberger and Ayrton Senna robbed the cars of their neat aerodynamics. Further points were scored in the German Grand Prix where the cars came 4th and 5th out of eight finishers Thanks to Michael Schumacher's disqualification from the Belgian Grand Prix, Morbidelli was promoted to 6th, which was some compensation for team-mate Fittipaldi being disqualified from 6th in the parc fermé at the 1994 Canadian Grand Prix. That allowed Footwork to finish 9th in the Constructors' Championship, with nine points. At the end of the year there was a setback when Fittipaldi quit Formula One and headed to the IndyCar World Series in the United States. Wickham also departed, with Alan Harrison replacing Wickham's role for 1995.

=== 1995 ===
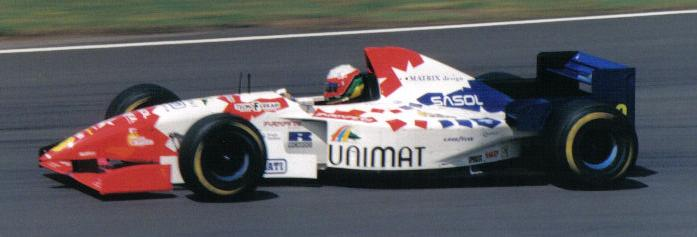
Massimiliano Papis driving for Footwork at the 1995 British Grand Prix

With an increasingly difficult financial situation the team picked pay driver Taki Inoue to partner Morbidelli in the Jenkins-designed Arrows-Hart FA16. In the mid-season there was so little money that Morbidelli had to be replaced by Max Papis, although he returned for the last three races and scored Footwork's first and only podium in Adelaide. That result, plus a 6th place in the Canadian Grand Prix allowed Footwork to finish 8th in the Constructors' Championship, equal on points with Tyrrell but claiming the higher position due to better results (the best results for Tyrrell were two fifth places). At the end of the year, Jackie Oliver and Alan Rees bought back the shares from Ohashi thanks to assistance from finance house Schwäbische Finanz & Unternehmensberatung AG.

=== 1996 ===
In March 1996, Tom Walkinshaw acquired a controlling interest in the team by buying out Rees. Walkinshaw controlled 40% of the shares with an associate Peter Darnbrough buying 11% and Oliver retaining 49%. The team was renamed TWR Arrows for the remaining part of the 1996 season (but continued to be recognised as Footwork by FIA until 1997 as mid-season constructor name changes are not permitted). Jos Verstappen scored with a 6th place in the Argentine Grand Prix, the last ever point for Footwork in Formula 1. The team finished 9th in the Constructors' Championship, as they had done in 1993 and 1994.

=== Aftermath ===
In 2001, Ohashi's company was involved in a fraud scandal that bankrupted the company; one year later, the TWR-operated Arrows team also collapsed due to financial problems.

== Complete Formula One results ==
(key) (results in bold indicate pole position)

Year	Chassis	Engine(s)	Tyres	Drivers	1	2	3	4	5	6	7	8	9	10	11	12	13	14	15	16	17	Points	WCC
1991	A11C; FA12	Porsche 3512 3.5 V12	G		USA	BRA	SMR	MON	CAN	MEX	FRA	GBR	GER	HUN	BEL	ITA	POR	ESP	JPN	AUS		0	NC
1991	A11C; FA12	Porsche 3512 3.5 V12	G	(Italy) Michele Alboreto	Ret	DNQ	DNQ	Ret	Ret	Ret												0	NC
1991	A11C; FA12	Porsche 3512 3.5 V12	G	(Italy) Alex Caffi	DNQ	DNQ	DNQ	DNQ														0	NC
1991	A11C; FA12	Porsche 3512 3.5 V12	G	(Sweden) Stefan Johansson					Ret	DNQ												0	NC
1991	FA12C	Ford Cosworth DFR 3.5 V8	G	(Italy) Michele Alboreto							Ret	Ret	DNQ	DNQ	DNPQ	DNQ	15	Ret	DNQ	13		0	NC
1991	FA12C	Ford Cosworth DFR 3.5 V8	G	(Sweden) Stefan Johansson							DNQ	DNQ										0	NC
1991	FA12C	Ford Cosworth DFR 3.5 V8	G	(Italy) Alex Caffi									DNPQ	DNPQ	DNQ	DNPQ	DNPQ	DNPQ	10	15		0	NC
1992	FA13	Mugen-Honda MF-351H 3.5 V10	G		RSA	MEX	BRA	ESP	SMR	MON	CAN	FRA	GBR	GER	HUN	BEL	ITA	POR	JPN	AUS		6	7th
1992	FA13	Mugen-Honda MF-351H 3.5 V10	G	(Italy) Michele Alboreto	10	13	6	5	5	7	7	7	7	9	7	Ret	7	6	15	Ret		6	7th
1992	FA13	Mugen-Honda MF-351H 3.5 V10	G	(Japan) Aguri Suzuki	8	DNQ	Ret	7	10	11	DNQ	Ret	12	Ret	Ret	9	Ret	10	8	8		6	7th
1993	FA13B; FA14	Mugen-Honda MF-351 HB 3.5 V10	G		RSA	BRA	EUR	SMR	ESP	MON	CAN	FRA	GBR	GER	HUN	BEL	ITA	POR	JPN	AUS		4	9th
1993	FA13B; FA14	Mugen-Honda MF-351 HB 3.5 V10	G	(United Kingdom) Derek Warwick	7	9	Ret	Ret	13	Ret	16	13	6	17	4	Ret	Ret	15	14	10		4	9th
1993	FA13B; FA14	Mugen-Honda MF-351 HB 3.5 V10	G	(Japan) Aguri Suzuki	Ret	Ret	Ret	9	10	Ret	13	12	Ret	Ret	Ret	Ret	Ret	Ret	Ret	7		4	9th
1994	FA15	Ford HBE7/8 3.5 V8	G		BRA	PAC	SMR	MON	ESP	CAN	FRA	GBR	GER	HUN	BEL	ITA	POR	EUR	JPN	AUS		9	9th
1994	FA15	Ford HBE7/8 3.5 V8	G	(Brazil) Christian Fittipaldi	Ret	4	13	Ret	Ret	DSQ	8	9	4	14	Ret	Ret	8	17	8	8		9	9th
1994	FA15	Ford HBE7/8 3.5 V8	G	(Italy) Gianni Morbidelli	Ret	Ret	Ret	Ret	Ret	Ret	Ret	Ret	5	Ret	6	Ret	9	11	Ret	Ret		9	9th
1995	FA16	Hart 830 3.0 V8	G		BRA	ARG	SMR	ESP	MON	CAN	FRA	GBR	GER	HUN	BEL	ITA	POR	EUR	PAC	JPN	AUS	5	8th
1995	FA16	Hart 830 3.0 V8	G	(Italy) Gianni Morbidelli	Ret	Ret	13	11	9	6	14								Ret	Ret	3	5	8th
1995	FA16	Hart 830 3.0 V8	G	(Italy) Max Papis								Ret	Ret	Ret	Ret	7	Ret	12				5	8th
1995	FA16	Hart 830 3.0 V8	G	(Japan) Taki Inoue	Ret	Ret	Ret	Ret	Ret	9	Ret	Ret	Ret	Ret	12	8	15	Ret	Ret	12	Ret	5	8th
1996	FA17	Hart 830 3.0 V8	G		AUS	BRA	ARG	EUR	SMR	MON	ESP	CAN	FRA	GBR	GER	HUN	BEL	ITA	POR	JPN		1	9th
1996	FA17	Hart 830 3.0 V8	G	(Brazil) Ricardo Rosset	9	Ret	Ret	11	Ret	Ret	Ret	Ret	11	Ret	11	8	9	Ret	14	13		1	9th
1996	FA17	Hart 830 3.0 V8	G	(Netherlands) Jos Verstappen	Ret	Ret	6	Ret	Ret	Ret	Ret	Ret	Ret	10	Ret	Ret	Ret	8	Ret	11		1	9th
