= 1993 Spanish Grand Prix =

- Race 5 of 16 in the 1993 Formula One World Championship
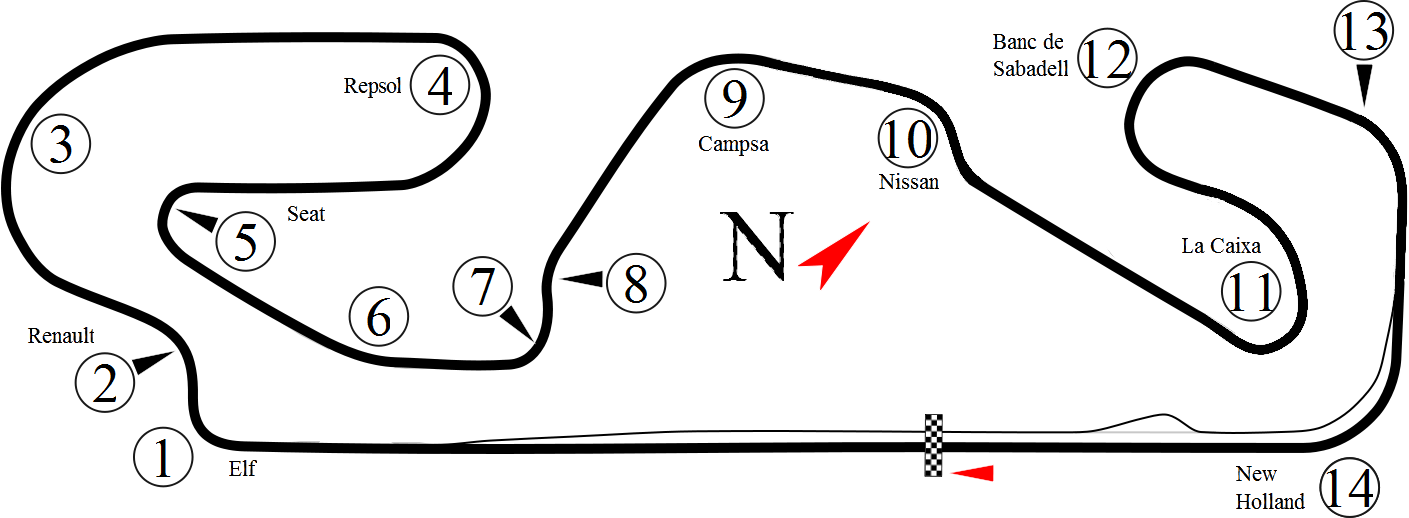

Race details
- Date: 9 May 1993
- Official name: Gran Premio de España
- Location: Circuit de Catalunya, Montmeló, Catalonia, Spain
- Course: Permanent racing facility
- Course length: 4.747 km (2.950 miles)
- Distance: 65 laps, 308.414 km (191.639 miles)
- Weather: Sunny
- Attendance: 35,000

Pole position
Driver	(France) Alain Prost	Williams-Renault
- Time: 1:17.809

Fastest lap
Driver	(Germany) Michael Schumacher	Benetton-Ford
- Time: 1:20.989 on lap 61

Podium
First	(France) Alain Prost	Williams-Renault
Second	(Brazil) Ayrton Senna	McLaren-Ford
Third	(Germany) Michael Schumacher	Benetton-Ford

The 1993 Spanish Grand Prix was a Formula One motor race held on 9 May 1993 at the Circuit de Catalunya. It was the fifth race of the 1993 Formula One World Championship. The 65-lap race was won from pole position by Alain Prost, driving a Williams-Renault, with Ayrton Senna second in a McLaren-Ford and Michael Schumacher third in a Benetton-Ford. This was the only time Prost, Senna and Schumacher shared the podium together.

The Williams-Renaults filled the front row in qualifying, with Prost ahead of Hill, Senna, Schumacher, Patrese and Wendlinger. At the start, Hill got ahead of Prost with no changes behind. Hill was leading Prost, Senna, Schumacher, Patrese and Wendlinger.

Hill and Prost pulled away from the rest with Prost taking the lead on lap 11. Later in the race Prost's car began to handle oddly and Hill closed up on him, attempting to re-overtake the Frenchman, only to retire when his engine failed on lap 41. Schumacher and Senna both pitted for tyres late in the race. Senna had a tardy stop, and he lost nearly all his advantage over Schumacher, who put in a string of fastest laps to close the gap. This challenge was ended when Schumacher went off the track at the final corner, after having to go off line to pass the smoking Lotus of Alessandro Zanardi. Prost won from Senna, Schumacher, Patrese, Andretti and Berger.

== Classification ==
=== Qualifying ===
Pos	No	Driver	Constructor	Q1	Q2	Gap
1	2	(France) Alain Prost	Williams-Renault	1:19.599	1:17.809	
2	0	(United Kingdom) Damon Hill	Williams-Renault	1:20.400	1:18.346	+0.537
3	8	(Brazil) Ayrton Senna	McLaren-Ford	1:20.221	1:19.722	+1.913
4	5	(Germany) Michael Schumacher	Benetton-Ford	1:21.148	1:20.520	+2.711
5	6	(Italy) Riccardo Patrese	Benetton-Ford	1:21.880	1:20.600	+2.791
6	29	(Austria) Karl Wendlinger	Sauber	1:23.696	1:21.203	+3.394
7	7	(United States) Michael Andretti	McLaren-Ford	1:22.286	1:21.360	+3.551
8	27	(France) Jean Alesi	Ferrari	1:23.614	1:21.767	+3.958
9	30	(Finland) JJ Lehto	Sauber	1:22.801	1:22.047	+4.238
10	12	(United Kingdom) Johnny Herbert	Lotus-Ford	1:23.541	1:22.470	+4.661
11	28	(Austria) Gerhard Berger	Ferrari	1:23.346	1:22.655	+4.846
12	26	(United Kingdom) Mark Blundell	Ligier-Renault	1:24.107	1:22.708	+4.899
13	19	(France) Philippe Alliot	Larrousse-Lamborghini	1:26.698	1:22.887	+5.078
14	20	(France) Érik Comas	Larrousse-Lamborghini	1:24.995	1:22.904	+5.095
15	11	(Italy) Alessandro Zanardi	Lotus-Ford	1:23.579	1:23.026	+5.217
16	9	(United Kingdom) Derek Warwick	Footwork-Mugen-Honda	1:23.971	1:23.086	+5.277
17	14	(Brazil) Rubens Barrichello	Jordan-Hart	1:24.708	1:23.232	+5.423
18	25	(United Kingdom) Martin Brundle	Ligier-Renault	1:24.748	1:23.357	+5.548
19	10	(Japan) Aguri Suzuki	Footwork-Mugen-Honda	1:24.158	1:23.432	+5.623
20	23	(Brazil) Christian Fittipaldi	Minardi-Ford	1:24.304	1:23.449	+5.640
21	15	(Belgium) Thierry Boutsen	Jordan-Hart	1:24.476	1:23.464	+5.655
22	22	(Italy) Luca Badoer	Lola-Ferrari	1:26.851	1:24.268	+6.459
23	3	(Japan) Ukyo Katayama	Tyrrell-Yamaha	1:25.607	1:24.291	+6.482
24	4	(Italy) Andrea de Cesaris	Tyrrell-Yamaha	1:27.724	1:24.358	+6.549
25	24	(Italy) Fabrizio Barbazza	Minardi-Ford	1:25.616	1:24.399	+6.590
DNQ	21	(Italy) Michele Alboreto	Lola-Ferrari	1:26.813	1:25.396	+7.587

=== Race ===
Pos	No	Driver	Constructor	Laps	Time/Retired	Grid	Points
1	2	(France) Alain Prost	Williams-Renault	65	1:32:27.685	1	10
2	8	(Brazil) Ayrton Senna	McLaren-Ford	65	+ 16.873	3	6
3	5	(Germany) Michael Schumacher	Benetton-Ford	65	+ 27.125	4	4
4	6	(Italy) Riccardo Patrese	Benetton-Ford	64	+ 1 Lap	5	3
5	7	(United States) Michael Andretti	McLaren-Ford	64	+ 1 Lap	7	2
6	28	(Austria) Gerhard Berger	Ferrari	63	+ 2 Laps	11	1
7	26	(United Kingdom) Mark Blundell	Ligier-Renault	63	+ 2 Laps	12	
8	23	(Brazil) Christian Fittipaldi	Minardi-Ford	63	+ 2 Laps	20	
9	20	(France) Érik Comas	Larrousse-Lamborghini	63	+ 2 Laps	14	
10	10	(Japan) Aguri Suzuki	Footwork-Mugen-Honda	63	+ 2 Laps	19	
11	15	(Belgium) Thierry Boutsen	Jordan-Hart	62	+ 3 Laps	21	
12	14	(Brazil) Rubens Barrichello	Jordan-Hart	62	+ 3 Laps	17	
13	9	(United Kingdom) Derek Warwick	Footwork-Mugen-Honda	62	+ 3 Laps	16	
14	11	(Italy) Alessandro Zanardi	Lotus-Ford	60	Engine	15	
Ret	30	(Finland) JJ Lehto	Sauber	53	Engine	9	
Ret	22	(Italy) Luca Badoer	Lola-Ferrari	43	Overheating	22	
Ret	29	(Austria) Karl Wendlinger	Sauber	42	Fuel system	6	
Ret	0	(United Kingdom) Damon Hill	Williams-Renault	41	Engine	2	
Ret	27	(France) Jean Alesi	Ferrari	40	Oil Leak	8	
Ret	24	(Italy) Fabrizio Barbazza	Minardi-Ford	37	Spun off	25	
Ret	19	(France) Philippe Alliot	Larrousse-Lamborghini	26	Transmission	13	
Ret	25	(United Kingdom) Martin Brundle	Ligier-Renault	11	Tyre	18	
Ret	3	(Japan) Ukyo Katayama	Tyrrell-Yamaha	11	Spun off	23	
Ret	12	(United Kingdom) Johnny Herbert	Lotus-Ford	2	Suspension	10	
DSQ	4	(Italy) Andrea de Cesaris	Tyrrell-Yamaha	42	Push start	24	

== Championship standings after the race ==
Drivers' Championship standings

	Pos	Driver	Points
1	1	(France) Alain Prost	34
1	2	(Brazil) Ayrton Senna	32
1	3	(Germany) Michael Schumacher	14
1	4	(United Kingdom) Damon Hill	12
	5	(United Kingdom) Mark Blundell	6

Constructors' Championship standings

Pos	Constructor	Points
1	(United Kingdom) Williams-Renault	46
2	(United Kingdom) McLaren-Ford	34
3	(United Kingdom) Benetton-Ford	19
4	(France) Ligier-Renault	10
5	(United Kingdom) Lotus-Ford	7

- Note: Only the top five positions are included for both sets of standings.

Previous race: 1993 San Marino Grand Prix	FIA Formula One World Championship; 1993 season	Next race: 1993 Monaco Grand Prix
Previous race: 1992 Spanish Grand Prix	Spanish Grand Prix	Next race: 1994 Spanish Grand Prix
