= 1993 San Marino Grand Prix =

- Race 4 of 16 in the 1993 Formula One World Championship
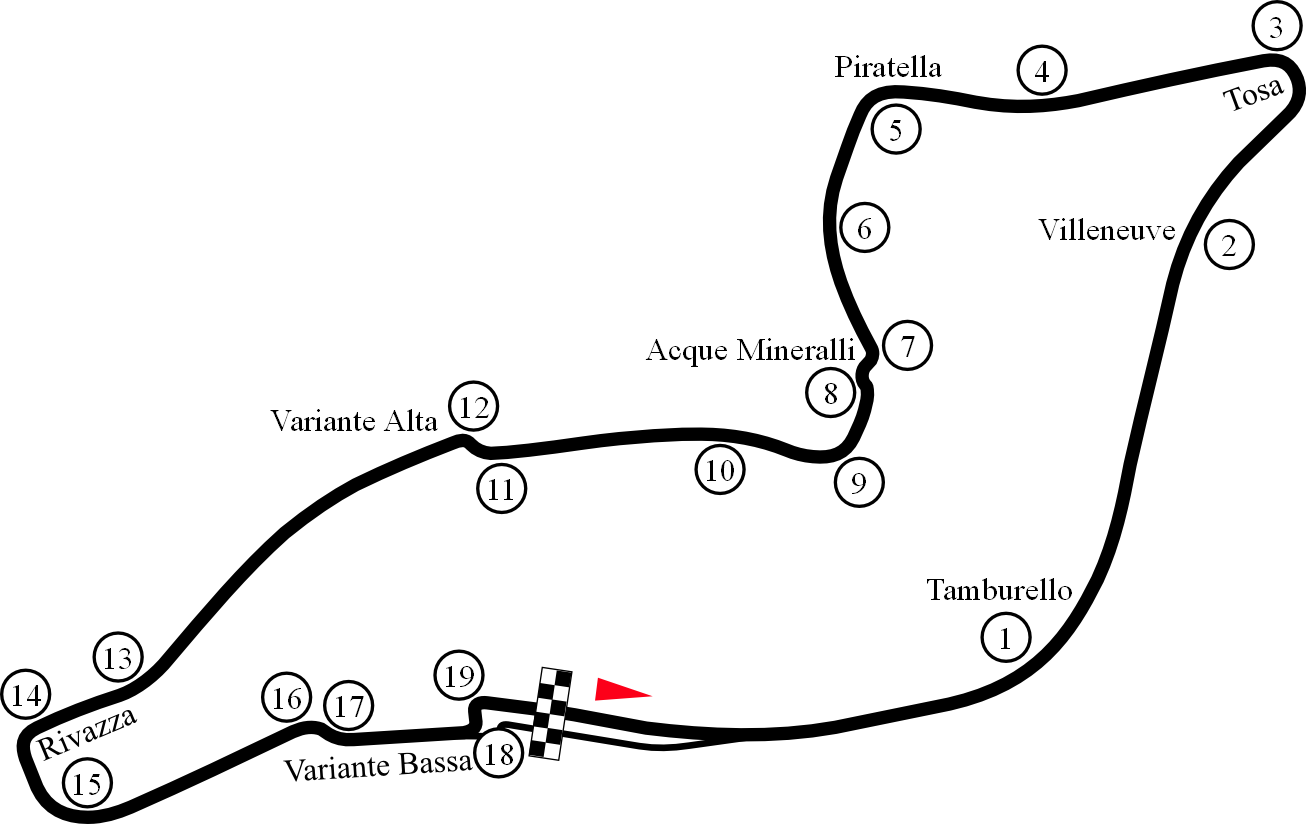

Race details
- Date: 25 April 1993
- Official name: XIII Gran Premio di San Marino
- Location: Autodromo Enzo e Dino Ferrari; Imola, Emilia-Romagna, Italy
- Course: Permanent racing facility
- Course length: 5.040 km (3.144 miles)
- Distance: 61 laps, 307.440 km (191.790 miles)
- Weather: Wet at start, dry later

Pole position
Driver	(France) Alain Prost	Williams-Renault
- Time: 1:22.070

Fastest lap
Driver	(France) Alain Prost	Williams-Renault
- Time: 1:26.128 on lap 42

Podium
First	(France) Alain Prost	Williams-Renault
Second	(Germany) Michael Schumacher	Benetton-Ford
Third	(United Kingdom) Martin Brundle	Ligier-Renault

The 1993 San Marino Grand Prix was a Formula One motor race held at Imola on 25 April 1993. It was the fourth race of the 1993 Formula One World Championship.

The 61-lap race was won by Frenchman Alain Prost, driving a Williams-Renault, after he started from pole position. Prost's British teammate, Damon Hill, led the early stages of the race before suffering a brake failure. German Michael Schumacher finished second in a Benetton-Ford, with another Briton, Martin Brundle, third in a Ligier-Renault.

== Qualifying report ==
Alain Prost maintained his record of taking pole position for every race in 1993, beating Williams teammate Damon Hill by just under a tenth of a second. Michael Schumacher was third in his Benetton, albeit 1.8 seconds behind Prost, with Ayrton Senna fourth in his McLaren. Less than two-tenths of a second separated the drivers from fifth to eleventh: Karl Wendlinger in the Sauber, Michael Andretti in the second McLaren, Mark Blundell in the Ligier, the two Ferraris of Gerhard Berger and Jean Alesi, Martin Brundle in the second Ligier, and Riccardo Patrese in the second Benetton. The non-qualifier was Michele Alboreto in the Lola.

=== Qualifying classification ===
Pos	No	Driver	Constructor	Q1	Q2	Gap
1	2	(France) Alain Prost	Williams-Renault	1:22.788	1:22.070	
2	0	(United Kingdom) Damon Hill	Williams-Renault	1:22.540	1:22.168	+0.098
3	5	(Germany) Michael Schumacher	Benetton-Ford	1:23.988	1:23.919	+1.849
4	8	(Brazil) Ayrton Senna	McLaren-Ford	1:24.042	1:24.007	+1.937
5	29	(Austria) Karl Wendlinger	Sauber	1:25.789	1:24.720	+2.650
6	7	(United States) Michael Andretti	McLaren-Ford	—	1:24.793	+2.723
7	26	(United Kingdom) Mark Blundell	Ligier-Renault	1:25.405	1:24.804	+2.734
8	28	(Austria) Gerhard Berger	Ferrari	1:24.822	1:25.161	+2.752
9	27	(France) Jean Alesi	Ferrari	1:24.906	1:24.829	+2.759
10	25	(United Kingdom) Martin Brundle	Ligier-Renault	1:26.181	1:24.893	+2.823
11	6	(Italy) Riccardo Patrese	Benetton-Ford	1:24.916	1:24.896	+2.826
12	12	(United Kingdom) Johnny Herbert	Lotus-Ford	1:25.742	1:25.115	+3.045
13	14	(Brazil) Rubens Barrichello	Jordan-Hart	1:26.142	1:25.169	+3.099
14	19	(France) Philippe Alliot	Larrousse-Lamborghini	1:25.482	1:25.629	+3.412
15	9	(United Kingdom) Derek Warwick	Footwork-Mugen-Honda	1:25.971	1:25.901	+3.831
16	30	(Finland) JJ Lehto	Sauber	1:25.941	1:26.358	+3.871
17	20	(France) Érik Comas	Larrousse-Lamborghini	1:26.947	1:26.279	+4.209
18	4	(Italy) Andrea de Cesaris	Tyrrell-Yamaha	1:27.312	1:26.429	+4.359
19	15	(Belgium) Thierry Boutsen	Jordan-Hart	1:26.810	1:26.436	+4.366
20	11	(Italy) Alessandro Zanardi	Lotus-Ford	1:26.465	1:35.748	+4.395
21	10	(Japan) Aguri Suzuki	Footwork-Mugen-Honda	1:26.707	1:26.657	+4.587
22	3	(Japan) Ukyo Katayama	Tyrrell-Yamaha	1:27.569	1:26.900	+4.830
23	23	(Brazil) Christian Fittipaldi	Minardi-Ford	1:27.753	1:27.277	+5.207
24	22	(Italy) Luca Badoer	Lola-Ferrari	1:27.371	1:27.388	+5.301
25	24	(Italy) Fabrizio Barbazza	Minardi-Ford	1:28.032	1:27.602	+5.532
DNQ	21	(Italy) Michele Alboreto	Lola-Ferrari	1:27.801	1:27.771	+5.701

== Race report ==
At the start, Prost was passed by Hill and Senna (who had already got ahead of Schumacher). Hill led Senna, Prost, Schumacher, Wendlinger and Andretti at the end of lap 1.

Hill pulled away quickly while Senna held up Prost. Prost passed Senna on lap 8 and set off after Hill. It was time for the stops and Senna got ahead of Prost in these stops. On lap 17, Prost audaciously overtook both Hill and Senna at Tosa in the presence of backmarkers. At the same time, Senna got ahead of Hill. Hill didn't last long, retiring with brake failure on lap 21. Both McLarens soon went out, Andretti from fifth on lap 33 by spinning off and Senna from second on lap 43 with a hydraulic failure. In between, Alesi, who took fifth after Andretti's spin retired with clutch failure. After being held up by Suzuki's Footwork, a large battle took place between Lehto and the two Lotuses of Herbert and Zanardi. Zanardi locked his front brakes into the final chicane, overshooting and ripping an oil line. Rejoining the circuit with the rear of the car on fire, he shortly retired on the approach to Tamburello.

Schumacher was now second and Wendlinger was third but Wendlinger retired with engine failure on lap 49, giving third to Brundle. Prost won from Schumacher, Brundle, Lehto, Philippe Alliot and Barbazza.

=== Race classification ===
Pos	No	Driver	Constructor	Laps	Time/Retired	Grid	Points
1	2	(France) Alain Prost	Williams-Renault	61	1:33:20.413	1	10
2	5	(Germany) Michael Schumacher	Benetton-Ford	61	+ 32.410	3	6
3	25	(United Kingdom) Martin Brundle	Ligier-Renault	60	+ 1 lap	10	4
4	30	(Finland) JJ Lehto	Sauber	59	Engine	16	3
5	19	(France) Philippe Alliot	Larrousse-Lamborghini	59	+ 2 laps	14	2
6	24	(Italy) Fabrizio Barbazza	Minardi-Ford	59	+ 2 laps	25	1
7	22	(Italy) Luca Badoer	Lola-Ferrari	58	+ 3 laps	24	
8	12	(United Kingdom) Johnny Herbert	Lotus-Ford	57	Engine	12	
9	10	(Japan) Aguri Suzuki	Footwork-Mugen-Honda	54	+ 7 laps	21	
Ret	11	(Italy) Alessandro Zanardi	Lotus-Ford	53	Spun off/fire	20	
Ret	29	(Austria) Karl Wendlinger	Sauber	48	Engine	5	
Ret	8	(Brazil) Ayrton Senna	McLaren-Ford	42	Hydraulics	4	
Ret	27	(France) Jean Alesi	Ferrari	40	Clutch	9	
Ret	23	(Brazil) Christian Fittipaldi	Minardi-Ford	36	Steering	23	
Ret	7	(United States) Michael Andretti	McLaren-Ford	32	Spun off	6	
Ret	9	(United Kingdom) Derek Warwick	Footwork-Mugen-Honda	29	Spun off	15	
Ret	3	(Japan) Ukyo Katayama	Tyrrell-Yamaha	22	Engine	22	
Ret	0	(United Kingdom) Damon Hill	Williams-Renault	20	Brakes	2	
Ret	20	(France) Érik Comas	Larrousse-Lamborghini	18	Engine	17	
Ret	4	(Italy) Andrea de Cesaris	Tyrrell-Yamaha	18	Gearbox	18	
Ret	14	(Brazil) Rubens Barrichello	Jordan-Hart	17	Spun off	13	
Ret	28	(Austria) Gerhard Berger	Ferrari	8	Gearbox	8	
Ret	15	(Belgium) Thierry Boutsen	Jordan-Hart	1	Gearbox	19	
Ret	26	(United Kingdom) Mark Blundell	Ligier-Renault	0	Accident	7	
Ret	6	(Italy) Riccardo Patrese	Benetton-Ford	0	Spun off	11	

== Championship standings after the race ==
Drivers' Championship standings

	Pos	Driver	Points
	1	(Brazil) Ayrton Senna	26
	2	(France) Alain Prost	24
	3	(United Kingdom) Damon Hill	12
2	4	(Germany) Michael Schumacher	10
1	5	(United Kingdom) Mark Blundell	6

Constructors' Championship standings

	Pos	Constructor	Points
	1	(United Kingdom) Williams-Renault	36
	2	(United Kingdom) McLaren-Ford	26
1	3	(United Kingdom) Benetton-Ford	12
1	4	(France) Ligier-Renault	10
2	5	(United Kingdom) Lotus-Ford	7

- Note: Only the top five positions are included for both sets of standings.

Previous race: 1993 European Grand Prix	FIA Formula One World Championship; 1993 season	Next race: 1993 Spanish Grand Prix
Previous race: 1992 San Marino Grand Prix	San Marino Grand Prix	Next race: 1994 San Marino Grand Prix
