= Alan Jenkins (engineer) =

British engineer and car designer (born 1947)

- Born: 24 July 1947 (age 78); Neston, Cheshire, England

Alan Jenkins (born 24 July 1947) is an engineer and designer who worked in Formula One with McLaren, Arrows, Onyx, Prost, and Stewart, and in CART with Penske.
