= List of career achievements by Michael Schumacher =

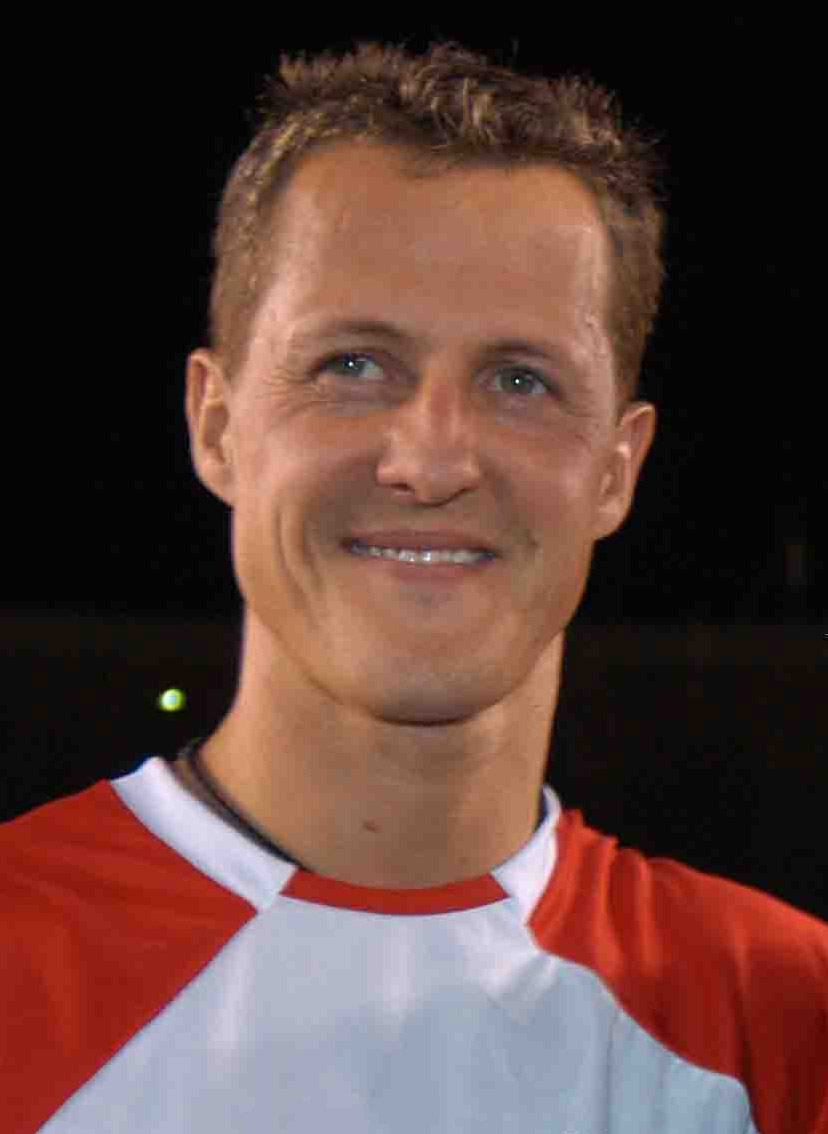
Schumacher in 2005

Michael Schumacher is a German former racing driver. Throughout his career in the grassroots categories, he won the 1990 German Formula Three Championship and 1990 Macau Grand Prix. In his Formula One career, Schumacher has won seven world titles a record shared with British driver Lewis Hamilton. Together with Sebastian Vettel, Schumacher won the Race of Champions Nations' Cup six times in a row for Germany, from 2007 to 2012.

== Karting record ==
| Season | Series | Position |
|---|---|---|
| 1984 | German Junior Kart Championship | 1st |
| 1985 | Junior World Championship | 2nd |
| 1985 | German Junior Kart Championship | 1st |
| 1986 | German Senior Kart Championship | 3rd |
| 1986 | European Kart Championship – North Zone | 2nd |
| 1986 | European Kart Championship Final | 3rd |
| 1987 | German Senior Kart Championship | 1st |
| 1987 | European Kart Championship – North Zone | 2nd |
| 1987 | European Kart Championship Final | 1st |
| 1996 | Monaco Kart Cup Formula A | 1st |
| 2007 | Desafio Internacional das Estrelas | 1st |
| 2009 | Desafio Internacional das Estrelas | 1st |

== Formula Three and Formula 3000 ==
=== Wins ===
| No. | Season | Series | Race | Circuit | Grid | Team | Ref. |
|---|---|---|---|---|---|---|---|
| 1 | 1989 | German Formula Three | Preis des Aichfeldes | Österreichring | 1 | WTS Racing | |
| 2 | 1989 | German Formula Three | Bilstein Super Sprint | Nurburgring | 1 | WTS Racing | |
| 3 | 1990 | German Formula Three | Avusrennen F3 | AVUS | 2 | WTS Racing | |
| 4 | 1990 | German Formula Three | Flugplatzrennen Wunstorf F3 | Wunstorf Air Base | 1 | WTS Racing | |
| 5 | 1990 | German Formula Three | Preis des Aichfeldes | Österreichring | 1 | WTS Racing | |
| 6 | 1990 | German Formula Three | Flugplatzrennen Diepholz F3 | Diepholz Airfield | 7 | WTS Racing | |
| 7 | 1990 | German Formula Three | Sportwagen Weltmeisterschaft | Nurburgring | 1 | WTS Racing | |
| 8 | 1990 | International Formula 3 | Macau Grand Prix | Guia Circuit | 2 | WTS Racing | |
| 9 | 1990 | International Formula 3 | Fuji F3 Challenge Cup | Fuji Speedway | 1 | WTS Racing | |

=== Podiums ===
| No. | Season | Series | Race | Circuit | Grid | Final | Team | Ref. |
|---|---|---|---|---|---|---|---|---|
| 1 | 1989 | German Formula Three | Rennsportfestival F3 | Hockenheimring | 2 | 3 | WTS Racing | |
| 2 | 1989 | German Formula Three | Eifelrennen F3 | Nurburgring | 5 | 3 | WTS Racing | |
| 3 | 1989 | German Formula Three | Avusrennen F3 | AVUS | 5 | 3 | WTS Racing | |
| 4 | 1989 | German Formula Three | Preis des Aichfeldes | Österreichring | 1 | 1 | WTS Racing | |
| 5 | 1989 | German Formula Three | ADAC Preis von Hockenheim F3 | Hockenheimring | 2 | 3 | WTS Racing | |
| 6 | 1989 | German Formula Three | Bilstein Super Sprint | Nurburgring | 1 | 1 | WTS Racing | |
| 7 | 1989 | German Formula Three | DMV Preis von Hockenheim | Hockenheimring | 2 | 3 | WTS Racing | |
| 8 | 1990 | German Formula Three | Avusrennen F3 | AVUS | 2 | 1 | WTS Racing | |
| 9 | 1990 | German Formula Three | Flugplatzrennen Wunstorf F3 | Wunstorf Air Base | 1 | 1 | WTS Racing | |
| 10 | 1990 | German Formula Three | 200 Meilen von Nürnberg F3 | Norisring | 4 | 2 | WTS Racing | |
| 11 | 1990 | German Formula Three | Preis des Aichfeldes | Österreichring | 1 | 1 | WTS Racing | |
| 12 | 1990 | German Formula Three | Flugplatzrennen Diepholz F3 | Diepholz Airfield | 7 | 1 | WTS Racing | |
| 13 | 1990 | German Formula Three | Sportwagen Weltmeisterschaft | Nurburgring | 1 | 1 | WTS Racing | |
| 14 | 1990 | German Formula Three | ADAC Preis von Hockenheim F3 | Hockenheimring | 2 | 2 | WTS Racing | |
| 15 | 1990 | International Formula 3 | Macau Grand Prix | Guia Circuit | 2 | 1 | WTS Racing | |
| 16 | 1990 | International Formula 3 | Fuji F3 Challenge Cup | Fuji Speedway | 1 | 1 | WTS Racing | |
| 17 | 1991 | Japanese Formula 3000 | Sugo Inter Formula | Sportsland Sugo | 4 | 2 | Team LeMans | |

== World Sportscar Championship ==
=== Wins ===
| No. | Season | Race | Circuit | Grid | Team | Teammate | Ref. |
|---|---|---|---|---|---|---|---|
| 1 | 1990 | 480 km of Mexico City | Autodromo Hermanos Rodriguez | 2 | Sauber-Mercedes | Jochen Mass | |
| 2 | 1991 | 430 km of Autopolis | Autopolis | 6 | Sauber-Mercedes | Karl Wendlinger | |

=== Podiums ===
| No. | Season | Race | Circuit | Grid | Final | Team | Teammate | Ref. |
|---|---|---|---|---|---|---|---|---|
| 1 | 1990 | 480 km of Dijon | Dijon-Prenois | 1 | 2 | Sauber-Mercedes | Jochen Mass | |
| 2 | 1990 | 480 km of Nürburgring | Nürburgring | 2 | 2 | Sauber-Mercedes | Jochen Mass | |
| 3 | 1990 | 480 km of Mexico City | Autodromo Hermanos Rodriguez | 2 | 1 | Sauber-Mercedes | Jochen Mass | |
| 4 | 1991 | 430 km of Silverstone | Silverstone Circuit | 5 | 2 | Sauber-Mercedes | Karl Wendlinger | |
| 5 | 1991 | 430 km of Autopolis | Autopolis | 6 | 1 | Sauber-Mercedes | Karl Wendlinger | |

== Formula One ==
=== World titles ===
| No. | Season | Team | Wins | Podiums | Pole positions | Retirements | Points | Ref. |
|---|---|---|---|---|---|---|---|---|
| 1 | 1994 | Benetton | 8 | 10 | 6 | 2 | 92 | |
| 2 | 1995 | Benetton | 9 | 11 | 4 | 4 | 102 | |
| 3 | 2000 | Ferrari | 9 | 12 | 9 | 4 | 108 | |
| 4 | 2001 | Ferrari | 9 | 14 | 11 | 2 | 123 | |
| 5 | 2002 | Ferrari | 11 | 17 | 7 | 0 | 144 | |
| 6 | 2003 | Ferrari | 6 | 9 | 5 | 1 | 93 | |
| 7 | 2004 | Ferrari | 13 | 15 | 8 | 1 | 148 | |

=== Wins ===
Key:

- No. – Victory number; for example, "1" signifies Schumacher's first race win.
- Race – Grand prix entries number in Schumacher's Formula One career; for example "36" signifies Schumacher's 36th Formula One grand prix entries.
- Grid – The position on the grid from which Schumacher started the race.
- Margin – Margin of victory, given in the format of minutes:seconds.milliseconds
- † – Driver's Championship winning season.

Grand Prix victories
| No. | Race | Date | Season | Grand Prix | Circuit | Grid | Margin | Team | Engine | Chassis | Ref |
|---|---|---|---|---|---|---|---|---|---|---|---|
| 1 | 18 | 30 August 1992 | 1992 | Belgian | Circuit de Spa-Francorchamps | 3 | 0:36.595 | Benetton | Ford | B192 | |
| 2 | 36 | 26 September 1993 | 1993 | Portuguese | Circuito do Estoril | 6 | 0:00.982 | Benetton | Ford | B193B | |
| 3 | 39 | 27 March 1994 | 1994^{†} | Brazilian | Autódromo José Carlos Pace | 2 | + 1 Lap | Benetton | Ford | B194 | |
| 4 | 40 | 17 April 1994 | 1994^{†} | Pacific | TI Circuit Aida | 2 | 1:15.300 | Benetton | Ford | B194 | |
| 5 | 41 | 1 May 1994 | 1994^{†} | San Marino | Autodromo Internazionale Enzo e Dino Ferrari | 2 | 0:54.942 | Benetton | Ford | B194 | |
| 6 | 42 | 15 May 1994 | 1994^{†} | Monaco | Circuit de Monaco | 1 | 0:37.278 | Benetton | Ford | B194 | |
| 7 | 44 | 12 June 1994 | 1994^{†} | Canadian | Circuit Gilles Villeneuve | 1 | 0:39.660 | Benetton | Ford | B194 | |
| 8 | 45 | 3 July 1994 | 1994^{†} | French | Circuit de Nevers Magny-Cours | 3 | 0:12.642 | Benetton | Ford | B194 | |
| 9 | 48 | 14 August 1994 | 1994^{†} | Hungarian | Hungaroring | 1 | 0:20.827 | Benetton | Ford | B194 | |
| 10 | 50 | 16 October 1994 | 1994^{†} | European | Circuito de Jerez | 1 | 0:24.689 | Benetton | Ford | B194 | |
| 11 | 53 | 26 March 1995 | 1995^{†} | Brazilian | Autódromo José Carlos Pace | 2 | 0:11.060 | Benetton | Renault | B195 | |
| 12 | 56 | 14 May 1995 | 1995^{†} | Spanish | Circuit de Barcelona-Catalunya | 1 | 0:51.988 | Benetton | Renault | B195 | |
| 13 | 57 | 28 May 1995 | 1995^{†} | Monaco | Circuit de Monaco | 2 | 0:34.817 | Benetton | Renault | B195 | |
| 14 | 59 | 2 July 1995 | 1995^{†} | French | Circuit de Nevers Magny-Cours | 2 | 0:31.309 | Benetton | Renault | B195 | |
| 15 | 61 | 30 July 1995 | 1995^{†} | German | Hockenheimring | 2 | 0:05.988 | Benetton | Renault | B195 | |
| 16 | 63 | 27 August 1995 | 1995^{†} | Belgian | Circuit de Spa-Francorchamps | 16 | 0:19.493 | Benetton | Renault | B195 | |
| 17 | 66 | 1 October 1995 | 1995^{†} | European | Nürburgring | 3 | 0:02.684 | Benetton | Renault | B195 | |
| 18 | 67 | 22 October 1995 | 1995^{†} | Pacific | TI Circuit Aida | 3 | 0:14.920 | Benetton | Renault | B195 | |
| 19 | 68 | 29 October 1995 | 1995^{†} | Japanese | Suzuka International Racing Course | 1 | 0:19.337 | Benetton | Renault | B195 | |
| 20 | 76 | 2 June 1996 | 1996 | Spanish | Circuit de Barcelona-Catalunya | 3 | 0:45.302 | Ferrari | Ferrari | F310 | |
| 21 | 82 | 25 August 1996 | 1996 | Belgian | Circuit de Spa-Francorchamps | 3 | 0:05.602 | Ferrari | Ferrari | F310 | |
| 22 | 83 | 8 September 1996 | 1996 | Italian | Autodromo Nazionale di Monza | 3 | 0:18.265 | Ferrari | Ferrari | F310 | |
| 23 | 90 | 11 May 1997 | 1997 | Monaco | Circuit de Monaco | 2 | 0:53.306 | Ferrari | Ferrari | F310B | |
| 24 | 92 | 15 June 1997 | 1997 | Canadian | Circuit Gilles Villeneuve | 1 | 0:02.565 | Ferrari | Ferrari | F310B | |
| 25 | 93 | 29 June 1997 | 1997 | French | Circuit de Nevers Magny-Cours | 1 | 0:23.537 | Ferrari | Ferrari | F310B | |
| 26 | 97 | 24 August 1997 | 1997 | Belgian | Circuit de Spa-Francorchamps | 3 | 0:26.753 | Ferrari | Ferrari | F310B | |
| 27 | 101 | 12 October 1997 | 1997 | Japanese | Suzuka International Racing Course | 2 | 0:01.378 | Ferrari | Ferrari | F310B | |
| 28 | 105 | 12 April 1998 | 1998 | Argentine | Autódromo de Buenos Aires Juan y Oscar Gálvez | 2 | 0:22.898 | Ferrari | Ferrari | F300 | |
| 29 | 109 | 7 June 1998 | 1998 | Canadian | Circuit Gilles Villeneuve | 3 | 0:16.662 | Ferrari | Ferrari | F300 | |
| 30 | 110 | 28 June 1998 | 1998 | French | Circuit de Nevers Magny-Cours | 2 | 0:19.575 | Ferrari | Ferrari | F300 | |
| 31 | 111 | 12 July 1998 | 1998 | British | Silverstone Circuit | 2 | 0:22.465 | Ferrari | Ferrari | F300 | |
| 32 | 114 | 16 August 1998 | 1998 | Hungarian | Hungaroring | 3 | 0:09.433 | Ferrari | Ferrari | F300 | |
| 33 | 116 | 13 September 1998 | 1998 | Italian | Autodromo Nazionale di Monza | 1 | 0:37.977 | Ferrari | Ferrari | F300 | |
| 34 | 121 | 2 May 1999 | 1999 | San Marino | Autodromo Internazionale Enzo e Dino Ferrari | 3 | 0:04.265 | Ferrari | Ferrari | F399 | |
| 35 | 122 | 16 May 1999 | 1999 | Monaco | Circuit de Monaco | 2 | 0:30.476 | Ferrari | Ferrari | F399 | |
| 36 | 129 | 12 March 2000 | 2000^{†} | Australian | Albert Park Circuit | 3 | 0:11.415 | Ferrari | Ferrari | F1-2000 | |
| 37 | 130 | 26 March 2000 | 2000^{†} | Brazilian | Autódromo José Carlos Pace | 3 | 0:39.898 | Ferrari | Ferrari | F1-2000 | |
| 38 | 131 | 9 April 2000 | 2000^{†} | San Marino | Autodromo Internazionale Enzo e Dino Ferrari | 2 | 0:01.168 | Ferrari | Ferrari | F1-2000 | |
| 39 | 134 | 21 May 2000 | 2000^{†} | European | Nürburgring | 2 | 0:13.822 | Ferrari | Ferrari | F1-2000 | |
| 40 | 136 | 18 June 2000 | 2000^{†} | Canadian | Circuit Gilles Villeneuve | 1 | 0:00.174 | Ferrari | Ferrari | F1-2000 | |
| 41 | 142 | 10 September 2000 | 2000^{†} | Italian | Autodromo Nazionale di Monza | 1 | 0:03.810 | Ferrari | Ferrari | F1-2000 | |
| 42 | 143 | 24 September 2000 | 2000^{†} | United States | Indianapolis Motor Speedway | 1 | 0:12.118 | Ferrari | Ferrari | F1-2000 | |
| 43 | 144 | 8 October 2000 | 2000^{†} | Japanese | Suzuka International Racing Course | 1 | 0:01.837 | Ferrari | Ferrari | F1-2000 | |
| 44 | 145 | 22 October 2000 | 2000^{†} | Malaysian | Sepang International Circuit | 1 | 0:00.732 | Ferrari | Ferrari | F1-2000 | |
| 45 | 146 | 4 March 2001 | 2001^{†} | Australian | Albert Park Circuit | 1 | 0:01.717 | Ferrari | Ferrari | F2001 | |
| 46 | 147 | 18 March 2001 | 2001^{†} | Malaysian | Sepang International Circuit | 1 | 0:23.660 | Ferrari | Ferrari | F2001 | |
| 47 | 150 | 29 April 2001 | 2001^{†} | Spanish | Circuit de Barcelona-Catalunya | 1 | 0:40.738 | Ferrari | Ferrari | F2001 | |
| 48 | 152 | 27 May 2001 | 2001^{†} | Monaco | Circuit de Monaco | 2 | 0:00.431 | Ferrari | Ferrari | F2001 | |
| 49 | 154 | 24 June 2001 | 2001^{†} | European | Nürburgring | 1 | 0:04.217 | Ferrari | Ferrari | F2001 | |
| 50 | 155 | 1 July 2001 | 2001^{†} | French | Circuit de Nevers Magny-Cours | 2 | 0:10.399 | Ferrari | Ferrari | F2001 | |
| 51 | 158 | 19 August 2001 | 2001^{†} | Hungarian | Hungaroring | 1 | 0:03.363 | Ferrari | Ferrari | F2001 | |
| 52 | 159 | 2 September 2001 | 2001^{†} | Belgian | Circuit de Spa-Francorchamps | 3 | 0:10.098 | Ferrari | Ferrari | F2001 | |
| 53 | 162 | 14 October 2001 | 2001^{†} | Japanese | Suzuka International Racing Course | 1 | 0:03.154 | Ferrari | Ferrari | F2001 | |
| 54 | 163 | 3 March 2002 | 2002^{†} | Australian | Albert Park Circuit | 2 | 0:18.628 | Ferrari | Ferrari | F2001 | |
| 55 | 165 | 31 March 2002 | 2002^{†} | Brazilian | Autódromo José Carlos Pace | 2 | 0:00.588 | Ferrari | Ferrari | F2002 | |
| 56 | 166 | 14 April 2002 | 2002^{†} | San Marino | Autodromo Internazionale Enzo e Dino Ferrari | 1 | 0:17.907 | Ferrari | Ferrari | F2002 | |
| 57 | 167 | 28 April 2002 | 2002^{†} | Spanish | Circuit de Barcelona-Catalunya | 1 | 0:35.630 | Ferrari | Ferrari | F2002 | |
| 58 | 168 | 12 May 2002 | 2002^{†} | Austrian | A1-Ring | 3 | 0:00.182 | Ferrari | Ferrari | F2002 | |
| 59 | 170 | 9 June 2002 | 2002^{†} | Canadian | Circuit Gilles Villeneuve | 2 | 0:01.132 | Ferrari | Ferrari | F2002 | |
| 60 | 172 | 7 July 2002 | 2002^{†} | British | Silverstone Circuit | 3 | 0:14.578 | Ferrari | Ferrari | F2002 | |
| 61 | 173 | 21 July 2002 | 2002^{†} | French | Circuit de Nevers Magny-Cours | 2 | 0:01.104 | Ferrari | Ferrari | F2002 | |
| 62 | 174 | 28 July 2002 | 2002^{†} | German | Hockenheimring | 1 | 0:10.503 | Ferrari | Ferrari | F2002 | |
| 63 | 176 | 1 September 2002 | 2002^{†} | Belgian | Circuit de Spa-Francorchamps | 1 | 0:01.977 | Ferrari | Ferrari | F2002 | |
| 64 | 179 | 13 October 2002 | 2002^{†} | Japanese | Suzuka International Racing Course | 1 | 0:00.506 | Ferrari | Ferrari | F2002 | |
| 65 | 183 | 20 April 2003 | 2003^{†} | San Marino | Autodromo Internazionale Enzo e Dino Ferrari | 1 | 0:01.882 | Ferrari | Ferrari | F2002 | |
| 66 | 184 | 4 May 2003 | 2003^{†} | Spanish | Circuit de Barcelona-Catalunya | 1 | 0:05.716 | Ferrari | Ferrari | F2003-GA | |
| 67 | 185 | 18 May 2003 | 2003^{†} | Austrian | A1-Ring | 1 | 0:03.362 | Ferrari | Ferrari | F2003-GA | |
| 68 | 187 | 15 June 2003 | 2003^{†} | Canadian | Circuit Gilles Villeneuve | 3 | 0:00.784 | Ferrari | Ferrari | F2003-GA | |
| 69 | 193 | 14 September 2003 | 2003^{†} | Italian | Autodromo Nazionale di Monza | 1 | 0:05.294 | Ferrari | Ferrari | F2003-GA | |
| 70 | 194 | 28 September 2003 | 2003^{†} | United States | Indianapolis Motor Speedway | 7 | 0:18.258 | Ferrari | Ferrari | F2003-GA | |
| 71 | 196 | 7 March 2004 | 2004^{†} | Australian | Albert Park Circuit | 1 | 0:13.605 | Ferrari | Ferrari | F2004 | |
| 72 | 197 | 21 March 2004 | 2004^{†} | Malaysian | Sepang International Circuit | 1 | 0:05.022 | Ferrari | Ferrari | F2004 | |
| 73 | 198 | 4 April 2004 | 2004^{†} | Bahrain | Bahrain International Circuit | 1 | 0:01.367 | Ferrari | Ferrari | F2004 | |
| 74 | 199 | 25 April 2004 | 2004^{†} | San Marino | Autodromo Internazionale Enzo e Dino Ferrari | 2 | 0:09.702 | Ferrari | Ferrari | F2004 | |
| 75 | 200 | 9 May 2004 | 2004^{†} | Spanish | Circuit de Barcelona-Catalunya | 1 | 0:13.290 | Ferrari | Ferrari | F2004 | |
| 76 | 202 | 30 May 2004 | 2004^{†} | European | Nürburgring | 1 | 0:17.989 | Ferrari | Ferrari | F2004 | |
| 77 | 203 | 13 June 2004 | 2004^{†} | Canadian | Circuit Gilles Villeneuve | 6 | 0:05.108 | Ferrari | Ferrari | F2004 | |
| 78 | 204 | 20 June 2004 | 2004^{†} | United States | Indianapolis Motor Speedway | 2 | 0:02.950 | Ferrari | Ferrari | F2004 | |
| 79 | 205 | 4 July 2004 | 2004^{†} | French | Circuit de Nevers Magny-Cours | 2 | 0:08.329 | Ferrari | Ferrari | F2004 | |
| 80 | 206 | 11 July 2004 | 2004^{†} | British | Silverstone Circuit | 4 | 0:02.130 | Ferrari | Ferrari | F2004 | |
| 81 | 207 | 25 July 2004 | 2004^{†} | German | Hockenheimring | 1 | 0:08.388 | Ferrari | Ferrari | F2004 | |
| 82 | 208 | 15 August 2004 | 2004^{†} | Hungarian | Hungaroring | 1 | 0:04.696 | Ferrari | Ferrari | F2004 | |
| 83 | 212 | 10 October 2004 | 2004^{†} | Japanese | Suzuka International Racing Course | 1 | 0:14.098 | Ferrari | Ferrari | F2004 | |
| 84 | 222 | 19 June 2005 | 2005 | United States | Indianapolis Motor Speedway | 5 | 0:01.522 | Ferrari | Ferrari | F2005 | |
| 85 | 236 | 23 April 2006 | 2006 | San Marino | Autodromo Internazionale Enzo e Dino Ferrari | 1 | 0:02.096 | Ferrari | Ferrari | 248 F1 | |
| 86 | 237 | 7 May 2006 | 2006 | European | Nürburgring | 2 | 0:03.751 | Ferrari | Ferrari | 248 F1 | |
| 87 | 242 | 2 July 2006 | 2006 | United States | Indianapolis Motor Speedway | 1 | 0:07.984 | Ferrari | Ferrari | 248 F1 | |
| 88 | 243 | 16 July 2006 | 2006 | French | Circuit de Nevers Magny-Cours | 1 | 0:10.131 | Ferrari | Ferrari | 248 F1 | |
| 89 | 244 | 30 July 2006 | 2006 | German | Hockenheimring | 2 | 0:00.720 | Ferrari | Ferrari | 248 F1 | |
| 90 | 247 | 10 September 2006 | 2006 | Italian | Autodromo Nazionale di Monza | 2 | 0:08.046 | Ferrari | Ferrari | 248 F1 | |
| 91 | 248 | 1 October 2006 | 2006 | Chinese | Shanghai International Circuit | 6 | 0:03.121 | Ferrari | Ferrari | 248 F1 | |

=== Podiums ===
| No. | Season | Grand Prix | Circuit | Grid | Final | Constructor | Ref. |
|---|---|---|---|---|---|---|---|
| 1 | 1992 | Mexican | Autódromo Hermanos Rodríguez | 3 | 3 | Benetton-Ford | |
| 2 | 1992 | Brazilian | Autódromo José Carlos Pace | 5 | 3 | Benetton-Ford | |
| 3 | 1992 | Spanish | Circuit de Catalunya | 2 | 2 | Benetton-Ford | |
| 4 | 1992 | Canadian | Circuit Gilles Villeneuve | 5 | 2 | Benetton-Ford | |
| 5 | 1992 | German | Hockenheimring | 6 | 3 | Benetton-Ford | |
| 6 | 1992 | Belgian | Spa-Francorchamps | 3 | 1 | Benetton-Ford | |
| 7 | 1992 | Italian | Autodromo Nazionale di Monza | 6 | 3 | Benetton-Ford | |
| 8 | 1992 | Australian | Adelaide Street Circuit | 5 | 2 | Benetton-Ford | |
| 9 | 1993 | Brazilian | Autódromo José Carlos Pace | 4 | 3 | Benetton-Ford | |
| 10 | 1993 | San Marino | Autodromo Enzo e Dino Ferrari | 3 | 2 | Benetton-Ford | |
| 11 | 1993 | Spanish | Circuit de Catalunya | 5 | 3 | Benetton-Ford | |
| 12 | 1993 | Canadian | Circuit Gilles Villeneuve | 3 | 2 | Benetton-Ford | |
| 13 | 1993 | French | Circuit de Magny-Cours | 7 | 3 | Benetton-Ford | |
| 14 | 1993 | British | Silverstone Circuit | 3 | 2 | Benetton-Ford | |
| 15 | 1993 | German | Hockenheimring | 3 | 2 | Benetton-Ford | |
| 16 | 1993 | Belgian | Spa-Francorchamps | 3 | 2 | Benetton-Ford | |
| 17 | 1993 | Portuguese | Autódromo do Estoril | 6 | 1 | Benetton-Ford | |
| 18 | 1994 | Brazilian | Autódromo José Carlos Pace | 2 | 1 | Benetton-Ford | |
| 19 | 1994 | Pacific | TI Circuit Aida | 2 | 1 | Benetton-Ford | |
| 20 | 1994 | San Marino | Autodromo Enzo e Dino Ferrari | 2 | 1 | Benetton-Ford | |
| 21 | 1994 | Monaco | Circuit de Monaco | 1 | 1 | Benetton-Ford | |
| 22 | 1994 | Spanish | Circuit de Catalunya | 1 | 2 | Benetton-Ford | |
| 23 | 1994 | Canadian | Circuit Gilles Villeneuve | 1 | 1 | Benetton-Ford | |
| 24 | 1994 | French | Circuit de Magny-Cours | 3 | 1 | Benetton-Ford | |
| 25 | 1994 | Hungarian | Hungaroring | 1 | 1 | Benetton-Ford | |
| 26 | 1994 | European | Circuito de Jerez | 1 | 1 | Benetton-Ford | |
| 27 | 1994 | Japanese | Suzuka Circuit | 1 | 2 | Benetton-Ford | |
| 28 | 1995 | Brazilian | Autódromo José Carlos Pace | 2 | 1 | Benetton-Renault | |
| 29 | 1995 | Argentine | Autódromo Oscar Alfredo Gálvez | 3 | 3 | Benetton-Renault | |
| 30 | 1995 | Spanish | Circuit de Catalunya | 1 | 1 | Benetton-Renault | |
| 31 | 1995 | Monaco | Circuit de Monaco | 2 | 1 | Benetton-Renault | |
| 32 | 1995 | French | Circuit de Magny-Cours | 2 | 1 | Benetton-Renault | |
| 33 | 1995 | German | Hockenheimring | 2 | 1 | Benetton-Renault | |
| 34 | 1995 | Belgian | Spa-Francorchamps | 16 | 1 | Benetton-Renault | |
| 35 | 1995 | Portuguese | Autódromo do Estoril | 3 | 2 | Benetton-Renault | |
| 36 | 1995 | European | Nurburgring | 3 | 1 | Benetton-Renault | |
| 37 | 1995 | Pacific | TI Circuit Aida | 3 | 1 | Benetton-Renault | |
| 38 | 1995 | Japanese | Suzuka Circuit | 1 | 1 | Benetton-Renault | |
| 39 | 1996 | Brazilian | Autódromo José Carlos Pace | 4 | 3 | Ferrari | |
| 40 | 1996 | European | Nurburgring | 3 | 2 | Ferrari | |
| 41 | 1996 | San Marino | Autodromo Enzo e Dino Ferrari | 1 | 2 | Ferrari | |
| 42 | 1996 | Spanish | Circuit de Catalunya | 3 | 1 | Ferrari | |
| 43 | 1996 | Belgian | Spa-Francorchamps | 3 | 1 | Ferrari | |
| 44 | 1996 | Italian | Autodromo Nazionale di Monza | 3 | 1 | Ferrari | |
| 45 | 1996 | Portuguese | Autódromo do Estoril | 4 | 3 | Ferrari | |
| 46 | 1996 | Japanese | Suzuka Circuit | 3 | 2 | Ferrari | |
| 47 | 1997 | Australian | Albert Park Circuit | 3 | 2 | Ferrari | |
| 48 | 1997 | San Marino | Autodromo Enzo e Dino Ferrari | 3 | 2 | Ferrari | |
| 49 | 1997 | Monaco | Circuit de Monaco | 2 | 1 | Ferrari | |
| 50 | 1997 | Canadian | Circuit Gilles Villeneuve | 1 | 1 | Ferrari | |
| 51 | 1997 | French | Circuit de Magny-Cours | 1 | 1 | Ferrari | |
| 52 | 1997 | German | Hockenheimring | 4 | 2 | Ferrari | |
| 53 | 1997 | Belgian | Spa-Francorchamps | 3 | 1 | Ferrari | |
| 54 | 1997 | Japanese | Suzuka Circuit | 2 | 1 | Ferrari | |
| 55 | 1998 | Brazilian | Autódromo José Carlos Pace | 4 | 3 | Ferrari | |
| 56 | 1998 | Argentine | Autódromo Oscar Alfredo Gálvez | 2 | 1 | Ferrari | |
| 57 | 1998 | San Marino | Autodromo Enzo e Dino Ferrari | 3 | 2 | Ferrari | |
| 58 | 1998 | Spanish | Circuit de Catalunya | 3 | 3 | Ferrari | |
| 59 | 1998 | Canadian | Circuit Gilles Villeneuve | 3 | 1 | Ferrari | |
| 60 | 1998 | French | Circuit de Magny-Cours | 2 | 1 | Ferrari | |
| 61 | 1998 | British | Silverstone Circuit | 2 | 1 | Ferrari | |
| 62 | 1998 | Austrian | A1-Ring | 4 | 3 | Ferrari | |
| 63 | 1998 | Hungarian | Hungaroring | 3 | 1 | Ferrari | |
| 64 | 1998 | Italian | Autodromo Nazionale di Monza | 1 | 1 | Ferrari | |
| 65 | 1998 | Luxembourg | Nurburgring | 1 | 2 | Ferrari | |
| 66 | 1999 | Brazilian | Autódromo José Carlos Pace | 4 | 2 | Ferrari | |
| 67 | 1999 | San Marino | Autodromo Enzo e Dino Ferrari | 3 | 1 | Ferrari | |
| 68 | 1999 | Monaco | Circuit de Monaco | 2 | 1 | Ferrari | |
| 69 | 1999 | Spanish | Circuit de Catalunya | 4 | 3 | Ferrari | |
| 70 | 1999 | Malaysian | Sepang International Circuit | 1 | 2 | Ferrari | |
| 71 | 1999 | Japanese | Suzuka Circuit | 1 | 2 | Ferrari | |
| 72 | 2000 | Australian | Albert Park Circuit | 3 | 1 | Ferrari | |
| 73 | 2000 | Brazilian | Autódromo José Carlos Pace | 3 | 1 | Ferrari | |
| 74 | 2000 | San Marino | Autodromo Enzo e Dino Ferrari | 2 | 1 | Ferrari | |
| 75 | 2000 | British | Silverstone Circuit | 5 | 3 | Ferrari | |
| 76 | 2000 | European | Nurburgring | 2 | 1 | Ferrari | |
| 77 | 2000 | Canadian | Circuit Gilles Villeneuve | 1 | 1 | Ferrari | |
| 78 | 2000 | Hungarian | Hungaroring | 1 | 2 | Ferrari | |
| 79 | 2000 | Belgian | Spa-Francorchamps | 4 | 2 | Ferrari | |
| 80 | 2000 | Italian | Autodromo Nazionale di Monza | 1 | 1 | Ferrari | |
| 81 | 2000 | United States | Indianapolis Motor Speedway | 1 | 1 | Ferrari | |
| 82 | 2000 | Japanese | Suzuka Circuit | 1 | 1 | Ferrari | |
| 83 | 2000 | Malaysian | Sepang International Circuit | 1 | 1 | Ferrari | |
| 84 | 2001 | Australian | Albert Park Circuit | 1 | 1 | Ferrari | |
| 85 | 2001 | Malaysian | Sepang International Circuit | 1 | 1 | Ferrari | |
| 86 | 2001 | Brazilian | Autódromo José Carlos Pace | 1 | 2 | Ferrari | |
| 87 | 2001 | Spanish | Circuit de Catalunya | 1 | 1 | Ferrari | |
| 88 | 2001 | Austrian | A1-Ring | 1 | 2 | Ferrari | |
| 89 | 2001 | Monaco | Circuit de Monaco | 2 | 1 | Ferrari | |
| 90 | 2001 | Canadian | Circuit Gilles Villeneuve | 1 | 2 | Ferrari | |
| 91 | 2001 | European | Nurburgring | 1 | 1 | Ferrari | |
| 92 | 2001 | French | Circuit de Magny-Cours | 2 | 1 | Ferrari | |
| 93 | 2001 | British | Silverstone Circuit | 1 | 2 | Ferrari | |
| 94 | 2001 | Hungarian | Hungaroring | 1 | 1 | Ferrari | |
| 95 | 2001 | Belgian | Spa-Francorchamps | 3 | 1 | Ferrari | |
| 96 | 2001 | United States | Indianapolis Motor Speedway | 1 | 2 | Ferrari | |
| 97 | 2001 | Japanese | Suzuka Circuit | 1 | 1 | Ferrari | |
| 98 | 2002 | Australian | Albert Park Circuit | 2 | 1 | Ferrari | |
| 99 | 2002 | Malaysian | Sepang International Circuit | 1 | 3 | Ferrari | |
| 100 | 2002 | Brazilian | Autódromo José Carlos Pace | 2 | 1 | Ferrari | |
| 101 | 2002 | San Marino | Autodromo Enzo e Dino Ferrari | 1 | 1 | Ferrari | |
| 102 | 2002 | Spanish | Circuit de Catalunya | 1 | 1 | Ferrari | |
| 103 | 2002 | Austrian | A1-Ring | 3 | 1 | Ferrari | |
| 104 | 2002 | Monaco | Circuit de Monaco | 3 | 2 | Ferrari | |
| 105 | 2002 | Canadian | Circuit Gilles Villeneuve | 2 | 1 | Ferrari | |
| 106 | 2002 | European | Nurburgring | 3 | 2 | Ferrari | |
| 107 | 2002 | British | Silverstone Circuit | 3 | 1 | Ferrari | |
| 108 | 2002 | French | Circuit de Magny-Cours | 2 | 1 | Ferrari | |
| 109 | 2002 | German | Hockenheimring | 1 | 1 | Ferrari | |
| 110 | 2002 | Hungarian | Hungaroring | 2 | 1 | Ferrari | |
| 111 | 2002 | Belgian | Spa-Francorchamps | 1 | 1 | Ferrari | |
| 112 | 2002 | Italian | Autodromo Nazionale di Monza | 2 | 2 | Ferrari | |
| 113 | 2002 | United States | Indianapolis Motor Speedway | 1 | 2 | Ferrari | |
| 114 | 2002 | Japanese | Suzuka Circuit | 1 | 1 | Ferrari | |
| 115 | 2003 | San Marino | Autodromo Enzo e Dino Ferrari | 1 | 1 | Ferrari | |
| 116 | 2003 | Spanish | Circuit de Catalunya | 1 | 1 | Ferrari | |
| 117 | 2003 | Austrian | A1-Ring | 1 | 1 | Ferrari | |
| 118 | 2003 | Monaco | Circuit de Monaco | 5 | 3 | Ferrari | |
| 119 | 2003 | Canadian | Circuit Gilles Villeneuve | 3 | 1 | Ferrari | |
| 120 | 2003 | French | Circuit de Magny-Cours | 3 | 3 | Ferrari | |
| 121 | 2003 | Italian | Autodromo Nazionale di Monza | 1 | 1 | Ferrari | |
| 122 | 2003 | United States | Indianapolis Motor Speedway | 7 | 1 | Ferrari | |
| 123 | 2004 | Australian | Albert Park Circuit | 1 | 1 | Ferrari | |
| 124 | 2004 | Malaysian | Sepang International Circuit | 1 | 1 | Ferrari | |
| 125 | 2004 | Bahrain | Bahrain International Circuit | 1 | 1 | Ferrari | |
| 126 | 2004 | San Marino | Autodromo Enzo e Dino Ferrari | 2 | 1 | Ferrari | |
| 127 | 2004 | Spanish | Circuit de Catalunya | 1 | 1 | Ferrari | |
| 128 | 2004 | European | Nurburgring | 1 | 1 | Ferrari | |
| 129 | 2004 | Canadian | Circuit Gilles Villeneuve | 6 | 1 | Ferrari | |
| 130 | 2004 | United States | Indianapolis Motor Speedway | 2 | 1 | Ferrari | |
| 131 | 2004 | French | Circuit de Magny-Cours | 2 | 1 | Ferrari | |
| 132 | 2004 | British | Silverstone Circuit | 4 | 1 | Ferrari | |
| 133 | 2004 | German | Hockenheimring | 1 | 1 | Ferrari | |
| 134 | 2004 | Hungarian | Hungaroring | 1 | 1 | Ferrari | |
| 135 | 2004 | Belgian | Spa-Francorchamps | 2 | 2 | Ferrari | |
| 136 | 2004 | Italian | Autodromo Nazionale di Monza | 3 | 2 | Ferrari | |
| 137 | 2004 | Japanese | Suzuka Circuit | 1 | 1 | Ferrari | |
| 138 | 2005 | San Marino | Autodromo Enzo e Dino Ferrari | 14 | 2 | Ferrari | |
| 139 | 2005 | Canadian | Circuit Gilles Villeneuve | 2 | 2 | Ferrari | |
| 140 | 2005 | United States | Indianapolis Motor Speedway | 5 | 1 | Ferrari | |
| 141 | 2005 | French | Circuit de Magny-Cours | 4 | 3 | Ferrari | |
| 142 | 2005 | Hungarian | Hungaroring | 1 | 2 | Ferrari | |
| 143 | 2006 | Bahrain | Bahrain International Circuit | 1 | 2 | Ferrari | |
| 144 | 2006 | San Marino | Autodromo Enzo e Dino Ferrari | 1 | 1 | Ferrari | |
| 145 | 2006 | European | Nurburgring | 2 | 1 | Ferrari | |
| 146 | 2006 | Spanish | Circuit de Catalunya | 3 | 2 | Ferrari | |
| 147 | 2006 | British | Silverstone Circuit | 3 | 2 | Ferrari | |
| 148 | 2006 | Canadian | Circuit Gilles Villeneuve | 5 | 2 | Ferrari | |
| 149 | 2006 | United States | Indianapolis Motor Speedway | 1 | 1 | Ferrari | |
| 150 | 2006 | French | Circuit de Magny-Cours | 1 | 1 | Ferrari | |
| 151 | 2006 | German | Hockenheimring | 2 | 1 | Ferrari | |
| 152 | 2006 | Turkish | Istanbul Park | 2 | 3 | Ferrari | |
| 153 | 2006 | Italian | Autodromo Nazionale di Monza | 2 | 1 | Ferrari | |
| 154 | 2006 | Chinese | Shanghai International Circuit | 6 | 1 | Ferrari | |
| 155 | 2012 | European | Valencia Street Circuit | 12 | 3 | Mercedes | |

=== Pole positions ===
| No. | Season | Grand Prix | Circuit | Time | Final | Constructor | Ref. |
|---|---|---|---|---|---|---|---|
| 1 | 1994 | Monaco | Circuit de Monaco | 1:18.560 | 1 | Benetton-Ford | |
| 2 | 1994 | Spanish | Circuit de Catalunya | 1:21.908 | 2 | Benetton-Ford | |
| 3 | 1994 | Canadian | Circuit Gilles Villeneuve | 1:26.178 | 1 | Benetton-Ford | |
| 4 | 1994 | Hungarian | Hungaroring | 1:18.258 | 1 | Benetton-Ford | |
| 5 | 1994 | European | Circuito de Jerez | 1:22.762 | 1 | Benetton-Ford | |
| 6 | 1994 | Japanese | Suzuka Circuit | 1:37.209 | 2 | Benetton-Ford | |
| 7 | 1995 | San Marino | Autodromo Enzo e Dino Ferrari | 1:27.274 | Ret | Benetton-Renault | |
| 8 | 1995 | Spanish | Circuit de Catalunya | 1:21.452 | 1 | Benetton-Renault | |
| 9 | 1995 | Canadian | Circuit Gilles Villeneuve | 1:27.661 | 5 | Benetton-Renault | |
| 10 | 1995 | Japanese | Suzuka Circuit | 1:38.023 | 1 | Benetton-Renault | |
| 11 | 1996 | San Marino | Autodromo Enzo e Dino Ferrari | 1:26.890 | 2 | Ferrari | |
| 12 | 1996 | Monaco | Circuit de Monaco | 1:20.356 | Ret | Ferrari | |
| 13 | 1996 | French | Circuit de Magny-Cours | 1:15.989 | DNS | Ferrari | |
| 14 | 1996 | Hungarian | Hungaroring | 1:17.129 | 9 | Ferrari | |
| 15 | 1997 | Canadian | Circuit Gilles Villeneuve | 1:18.095 | 1 | Ferrari | |
| 16 | 1997 | French | Circuit de Magny-Cours | 1:14.548 | 1 | Ferrari | |
| 17 | 1997 | Hungarian | Hungaroring | 1:14.672 | 4 | Ferrari | |
| 18 | 1998 | Italian | Autodromo Nazionale di Monza | 1:25.298 | 1 | Ferrari | |
| 19 | 1998 | Luxembourg | Nurburgring | 1:18.561 | 2 | Ferrari | |
| 20 | 1998 | Japanese | Suzuka Circuit | 1:36.293 | Ret | Ferrari | |
| 21 | 1999 | Canadian | Circuit Gilles Villeneuve | 1:19.298 | Ret | Ferrari | |
| 22 | 1999 | Malaysian | Sepang International Circuit | 1:39.688 | 2 | Ferrari | |
| 23 | 1999 | Japanese | Suzuka Circuit | 1:37.470 | 2 | Ferrari | |
| 24 | 2000 | Spanish | Circuit de Catalunya | 1:20.974 | 5 | Ferrari | |
| 25 | 2000 | Monaco | Circuit de Monaco | 1:19.475 | Ret | Ferrari | |
| 26 | 2000 | Canadian | Circuit Gilles Villeneuve | 1:18.439 | 1 | Ferrari | |
| 27 | 2000 | French | Circuit de Magny-Cours | 1:15.632 | Ret | Ferrari | |
| 28 | 2000 | Hungarian | Hungaroring | 1:17.514 | 2 | Ferrari | |
| 29 | 2000 | Italian | Autodromo Nazionale di Monza | 1:23.770 | 1 | Ferrari | |
| 30 | 2000 | United States | Indianapolis Motor Speedway | 1:14.266 | 1 | Ferrari | |
| 31 | 2000 | Japanese | Suzuka Circuit | 1:35.825 | 1 | Ferrari | |
| 32 | 2000 | Malaysian | Sepang International Circuit | 1:37.397 | 1 | Ferrari | |
| 33 | 2001 | Australian | Albert Park Circuit | 1:20.974 | 1 | Ferrari | |
| 34 | 2001 | Malaysian | Sepang International Circuit | 1:35.220 | 1 | Ferrari | |
| 35 | 2001 | Brazilian | Autódromo José Carlos Pace | 1:13.780 | 2 | Ferrari | |
| 36 | 2001 | Spanish | Circuit de Catalunya | 1:18.201 | 1 | Ferrari | |
| 37 | 2001 | Austrian | A1-Ring | 1:09.562 | 2 | Ferrari | |
| 38 | 2001 | Canadian | Circuit Gilles Villeneuve | 1:15.782 | 2 | Ferrari | |
| 39 | 2001 | European | Nurburgring | 1:14.960 | 1 | Ferrari | |
| 40 | 2001 | British | Silverstone Circuit | 1:20.447 | 2 | Ferrari | |
| 41 | 2001 | Hungarian | Hungaroring | 1:14.082 | 1 | Ferrari | |
| 42 | 2001 | United States | Indianapolis Motor Speedway | 1:11.708 | 2 | Ferrari | |
| 43 | 2001 | Japanese | Suzuka Circuit | 1:32.484 | 1 | Ferrari | |
| 44 | 2002 | Malaysian | Sepang International Circuit | 1:35.266 | 3 | Ferrari | |
| 45 | 2002 | San Marino | Autodromo Enzo e Dino Ferrari | 1:21.091 | 1 | Ferrari | |
| 46 | 2002 | Spanish | Circuit de Catalunya | 1:16.364 | 1 | Ferrari | |
| 47 | 2002 | German | Hockenheimring | 1:14.389 | 1 | Ferrari | |
| 48 | 2002 | Belgian | Spa-Francorchamps | 1:43.726 | 1 | Ferrari | |
| 49 | 2002 | United States | Indianapolis Motor Speedway | 1:10.790 | 2 | Ferrari | |
| 50 | 2002 | Japanese | Suzuka Circuit | 1:31.317 | 1 | Ferrari | |
| 51 | 2003 | Australian | Albert Park Circuit | 1:27.173 | 4 | Ferrari | |
| 52 | 2003 | San Marino | Autodromo Enzo e Dino Ferrari | 1:22.327 | 1 | Ferrari | |
| 53 | 2003 | Spanish | Circuit de Catalunya | 1:16.364 | 1 | Ferrari | |
| 54 | 2003 | Austrian | A1-Ring | 1:09.150 | 1 | Ferrari | |
| 55 | 2003 | Italian | Autodromo Nazionale di Monza | 1:20.963 | 1 | Ferrari | |
| 56 | 2004 | Australian | Albert Park Circuit | 1:24.408 | 1 | Ferrari | |
| 57 | 2004 | Malaysian | Sepang International Circuit | 1:33.074 | 1 | Ferrari | |
| 58 | 2004 | Bahrain | Bahrain International Circuit | 1:30.139 | 1 | Ferrari | |
| 59 | 2004 | Spanish | Circuit de Catalunya | 1:15.022 | 1 | Ferrari | |
| 60 | 2004 | European | Nurburgring | 1:28.351 | 1 | Ferrari | |
| 61 | 2004 | German | Hockenheimring | 1:13.306 | 1 | Ferrari | |
| 62 | 2004 | Hungarian | Hungaroring | 1:19.146 | 1 | Ferrari | |
| 63 | 2004 | Japanese | Suzuka Circuit | 1:33.542 | 1 | Ferrari | |
| 64 | 2005 | Hungarian | Hungaroring | 1:19.882 | 2 | Ferrari | |
| 65 | 2006 | 2006 Bahrain Grand Prix | Bahrain International Circuit | 1:31.431 | 2 | Ferrari | |
| 66 | 2006 | San Marino | Autodromo Enzo e Dino Ferrari | 1:22.795 | 1 | Ferrari | |
| 67 | 2006 | United States | Indianapolis Motor Speedway | 1:10.832 | 1 | Ferrari | |
| 68 | 2006 | French | Circuit de Magny-Cours | 1:15.493 | 1 | Ferrari | |

=== Records ===
| Description | Achieved | Record |
Championships
| Most World Championship titles | 2003 | 7 (Note: Record shared with Lewis Hamilton.) |
| Most consecutive World Championship titles | 2000–2004 | 5 |
| Most races left in the season when becoming World Champion | 2002 | 6 (Note: Record shared with Max Verstappen (2023).) |
| Youngest quintuple World Championship winner | 2002 French Grand Prix | 33 years, 201 days |
Wins
| Most consecutive seasons with a win | 1992–2006 | 15 |
| Most consecutive wins from first race of season | 2004 | 5 (Note: Record shared with Nigel Mansell (1992).) |
| Most wins in a driver's home country | German Grand Prix (1995, 2002, 2004, 2006); European Grand Prix (1995, 2000–2001, 2004, 2006) | 9 |
| Most wins not starting from front row | 2005 United States Grand Prix | 24 |
| Most wins not starting from pole position | 2002 Australian Grand Prix | 51 |
Podiums
| Most consecutive top two finishes | Brazil 2002 – Japan 2002 | 15 (Note: Record shared with Max Verstappen.) |
| Highest percentage of podium finishes in one season | 2002 | 100% |
| Most consecutive podium finishes | 2001 United States Grand Prix – 2002 Japanese Grand Prix | 19 |
| Most consecutive podium finishes from first race of season | 2002 | 17 |
| Most podium finishes in a driver's home country | German Grand Prix (1992–1993, 1995, 1997, 2002, 2004, 2006); European Grand Prix (1995–1996, 2000–2002, 2004, 2006); Luxembourg Grand Prix (1998) | 15 |
Fastest laps
| Most fastest laps | 2001 Australian Grand Prix | 77 |
| Most fastest laps in a season | 2004 | 10 (Note: Record shared with Kimi Räikkönen (2005 and 2008).) |
| Most fastest laps at the same Grand Prix | Spanish Grand Prix (1993–1994, 1996, 1999, 2001–2002, 2004) | 7 (Note: Record shared with Nigel Mansell and Lewis Hamilton.) |
| Most wins with fastest lap | 2000 Brazilian Grand Prix | 48 |
Other
| Most hat-tricks (pole, win and fastest lap) | 2002 Japanese Grand Prix | 22 |

Footnotes

== Race of Champions record ==
=== Drivers Cup ===
| No. | Year | Location | Result | Last opponent | Ref. |
|---|---|---|---|---|---|
| 1 | 2004 | Stade de France | Runner-up | (Finland) Heikki Kovalainen | |
| 2 | 2007 | Wembley Stadium | Runner-up | (Sweden) Mattias Ekström | |
| 3 | 2008 | Wembley Stadium | Quarter-finalist | (United States) Carl Edwards | |
| 4 | 2009 | Beijing National Stadium | Runner-up | (Sweden) Mattias Ekström | |
| 5 | 2010 | Esprit Arena | Quarter-finalist | (Germany) Sebastian Vettel | |
| 6 | 2011 | Esprit Arena | Semi-finalist | (Denmark) Tom Kristensen | |
| 7 | 2012 | Rajamangala Stadium | Semi-finalist | (France) Romain Grosjean | |

=== Nations Cup ===
| No. | Year | Location | Representing | Result | Last opponent | Ref. |
|---|---|---|---|---|---|---|
| 1 | 2004 | Stade de France | Germany (with Armin Schwarz) | Quarter-finalist | Brazil (Felipe Massa and Tony Kanaan) | |
| 2 | 2007 | Wembley Stadium | Germany (with Sebastian Vettel) | Winner | Finland (Marcus Grönholm and Heikki Kovalainen) | |
| 3 | 2008 | Wembley Stadium | Germany (with Sebastian Vettel) | Winner | Scandinavia (Mattias Ekström and Tom Kristensen) | |
| 4 | 2009 | Beijing National Stadium | Germany (with Sebastian Vettel) | Winner | Great Britain (Jenson Button and Andy Priaulx) | |
| 5 | 2010 | Esprit Arena | Germany (with Sebastian Vettel) | Winner | Great Britain (Jason Plato and Andy Priaulx) | |
| 6 | 2011 | Esprit Arena | Germany (with Sebastian Vettel) | Winner | Nordic (Juho Hänninen and Tom Kristensen) | |
| 7 | 2012 | Rajamangala Stadium | Germany (with Sebastian Vettel) | Winner | France (Romain Grosjean and Sébastien Ogier) | |

== Awards ==
| Awards | Year | Ref. |
|---|---|---|
| Deutscher Motor Sport Bund - ONS Trophy | 1992, 1994, 1995, 2002 | |
| Bild am Sonntag - Golden Steering Wheel Award | 1993 | |
| Bambi Sports Award | 1994 | |
| German Sports Personality of the Year | 1995, 2004 | |
| Autosport International Racing Driver of the Year | 1995, 2000, 2001, 2002 | |
| RTL Golden Lion Award for Best Sports Liveact | 1997 | |
| Silbernes Lorbeerblatt | 1997 | |
| F1 Racing Award - Driver of the Year | 2000, 2001, 2002, 2004, 2006 | |
| F1 Racing Award - Man of the Year | 2000, 2001, 2002, 2003, 2004, 2006 | |
| Marca Leyenda Award | 2001 | |
| Honorary Citizenship of Modena | 2001 | |
| Gazzetta World Sports Award | 2001, 2002 | |
| F1 Racing Award - Qualifier of the Year | 2001, 2004 | |
| European Sportsperson of the Year | 2001, 2002, 2003 | |
| L'Équipe Champion of Champions | 2001, 2002, 2004 | |
| Honorary Commander of the Order of Merit of the Italian Republic | 2002 | |
| UNESCO Champion for Sport | 2002 | |
| Laureus World Sports Award for Sportsman of the Year | 2002, 2004 | |
| Lorenzo Bandini Trophy | 2003 | |
| Honorary Ambassador for San Marino | 2003 | |
| ZDF Sports Personality of the Century | 2004 | |
| Honorary Citizenship of Maranello | 2006 | |
| FIA Gold Medal for Motor Sport | 2006 | |
| Prince of Asturias Awards | 2007 | |
| German TV Award for Special Prize | 2007 | |
| Swiss Football Association Country Ambassador for UEFA Euro 2008 | 2008 | |
| Honorary Chevalier de la Légion d'honneur | 2010 | |
| Honorary Citizenship of Spa | 2012 | |
| Honorary Citizenship of Sarajevo | 2014 | |
| FIA Hall of Fame | 2017 | |
| Germany's Sports Hall of Fame | 2017 | |
| FIA President Award | 2020 | |
| State Prize of North Rhine-Westphalia | 2022 | |

== Filmography ==
| Year | Title | Role | Production | Ref. |
|---|---|---|---|---|
| 2006 | Cars | Michael Schumacher Ferrari | Pixar Animation Studios/Walt Disney Studios | |
| 2006 | Ein Leben am Limit – das Ausnahmetalent Michael Schumacher | Himself | Sky Deutschland | |
| 2008 | Asterix at the Olympic Games | Schumix | Pathé Renn Productions | |
| 2012 | Michael Schumacher: The Red Baron | Himself | Worldwide Entertainment | |
| 2015 | Legends of Speed | Himself | Autentic Production | |
| 2019 | Michael Schumacher: The Making of a Legend | Himself | Formula One Management | |
| 2019 | Michael Schumacher – Einem Phänomen auf der Spur | Himself | ARD | |
| 2019 | Die Michael-Schumacher-Story | Himself | RTL | |
| 2021 | Schumacher | Himself | Netflix | |

== See also ==
- List of Formula One driver records
