= 1989 in motorsport =

The following is an overview of the events of 1989 in motorsport including the major racing events, motorsport venues that were opened and closed during a year, championships and non-championship events that were established and disestablished in a year, and births and deaths of racing drivers and other motorsport people.

== Annual events ==
The calendar includes only annual major non-championship events or annual events that had significance separate from the championship. For the dates of the championship events see related season articles.

Date	Event	Ref
25 December-13 January	11th Dakar Rally	
4–5 February	27th 24 Hours of Daytona	
19 February	31st Daytona 500	
7 May	47th Monaco Grand Prix	
28 May	73rd Indianapolis 500	
29 May-9 June	72nd Isle of Man TT	
10–11 June	57th 24 Hours of Le Mans	
17–18 June	17th 24 Hours of Nurburgring	
22–23 July	41st 24 Hours of Spa	
30 July	12th Suzuka 8 Hours	
1 October	30th Tooheys 1000	
26 November	36th Macau Grand Prix	
2–3 December	2nd Race of Champions	

== Births ==
Date	Month	Name	Nationality	Occupation	Note	Ref
1	July	Daniel Ricciardo	Australian	Racing driver	Formula One driver at McLaren. 8 wins, including the 2018 Monaco GP	
3	August	Jules Bianchi	French	Racing driver	2009 Formula 3 Euro Series champion. Formula One driver.	
10	November	Brendon Hartley	New Zealand	Racing driver	24 Hours of Le Mans winner (2017). FIA World Endurance champion (2015, 2017).	

== Deaths ==
Date	Month	Name	Age	Nationality	Occupation	Note	Ref
7	June	Chico Landi	81	Brazilian	Racing driver	The first Brazilian Formula One driver.	
20	September	Richie Ginther	59	American	Racing driver	1965 Mexican Grand Prix winner.	

== See also ==
- List of 1989 motorsport champions
