= 2002 Japanese Grand Prix =

Coordinates: 34°50′35″N 136°32′26″E

Race 17 of 17 in the 2002 Formula One World Championship
← Previous race	Next race →

Race details
- Date: 13 October 2002
- Official name: 2002 Fuji Television Japanese Grand Prix
- Location: Suzuka Circuit, Suzuka, Mie, Japan
- Course: Permanent racing facility
- Course length: 5.821 km (3.617 miles)
- Distance: 53 laps, 308.317 km (191.579 miles)
- Weather: Sunny, Air: 26 °C (79 °F), Track 30 °C (86 °F)
- Attendance: 326,000

Pole position
Driver	(Germany) Michael Schumacher	Ferrari
- Time: 1:31.317

Fastest lap
Driver	(Germany) Michael Schumacher	Ferrari
- Time: 1:36.125 on lap 15

Podium
First	(Germany) Michael Schumacher	Ferrari
Second	(Brazil) Rubens Barrichello	Ferrari
Third	(Finland) Kimi Räikkönen	McLaren-Mercedes

The 2002 Japanese Grand Prix, formally the 2002 Fuji Television Japanese Grand Prix, was a Formula One motor race that was held at the Suzuka Circuit in Suzuka, Mie Prefecture, Japan on 13 October 2002, before a crowd of 155,000 spectators. It was the 17th and final round of the 2002 Formula One World Championship. Ferrari driver Michael Schumacher won the 53-lap race from pole position. His teammate Rubens Barrichello finished in second and McLaren's Kimi Räikkönen was third.

World Drivers' Champion Michael Schumacher qualified on pole position after setting the fastest overall lap time in the one hour qualifying session. Barrichello started from second, with McLaren's David Coulthard third. Michael Schumacher maintained his pole position advantage going into the first corner and maintained the lead for most of the race, except for one lap during the first round of pit stops when he relinquished it to Barrichello, leading to Ferrari's one-two finish. His teammate Barrichello finished second, 0.506 seconds behind, when Michael Schumacher slowed in the last laps of the race. Räikkönen took third when Williams driver Ralf Schumacher's engine failed with five laps remaining.

It was Michael Schumacher's 11th victory of the season and 64th in Formula One; he also became the first driver to finish on the podium at every Grand Prix of the season. Ferrari won 15 races this season, matching McLaren's record set in 1988. As a result of the race, Michael Schumacher concluded the year with a season-record 144 championship points scored in the World Drivers' Championship, a record 67 championship points ahead of his teammate Barrichello. Ferrari scored 221 championship points in the World Constructors' Championship, as many as the other ten teams combined.

== Background ==
The 2002 Japanese Grand Prix was the 17th and final round of the 2002 Formula One World Championship. It was held at the 5.821 km (3.617 mi) Suzuka Circuit in the city of Suzuka, Mie Prefecture, Japan on 13 October 2002. After the previous year's race, the track was shortened by 38 m (125 ft) from 5.859 km (3.641 mi) by realigning key turns to allow for wider run-off areas. The S-curves and Dunlop Curves were partially realigned and the retaining barriers were relocated back. The Formula Dream and Integra Type-R Challenge Cup held support races during the race weekend.

Before the race, both the World Drivers' Championship and World Constructors' Championship were already won, with Ferrari driver Michael Schumacher having secured the World Drivers' Championship six rounds earlier at the French Grand Prix and Ferrari took the World Constructors' Championship two races after that at the Hungarian Grand Prix, with Williams too many championship points behind to be able to catch them. The main focus of attention was the battle for third place in the World Drivers' Championship with six points separating Williams' Juan Pablo Montoya, his teammate Ralf Schumacher and McLaren's David Coulthard, which would be determined in Suzuka.

Following the United States Grand Prix on 29 September, most of the teams tested car and mechanical components, racing setups and tyres at various European circuits in preparation for the Japanese Grand Prix. The British American Racing (BAR), McLaren, Toyota and Williams all conducted three-day tests at Spain's Circuit de Barcelona. Alexander Wurz, McLaren's test driver, was quickest on the opening two days, breaking the track lap record on the second day. Williams test driver Antônio Pizzonia lapped fastest on the final day. Jordan's Takuma Sato tested for two days at the Silverstone Circuit in England, while Renault test driver Oliver Gavin did so for three days. Ferrari test driver Luca Badoer and Sauber tested for three day at Italy's Mugello Circuit. Luciano Burti spent three days testing Ferrari's Bridgestone tyres at Spain's Circuito de Jerez. Badoer finished Ferrari's race preparations with two days of wet-weather tyre testing at Italy's Fiorano Circuit.

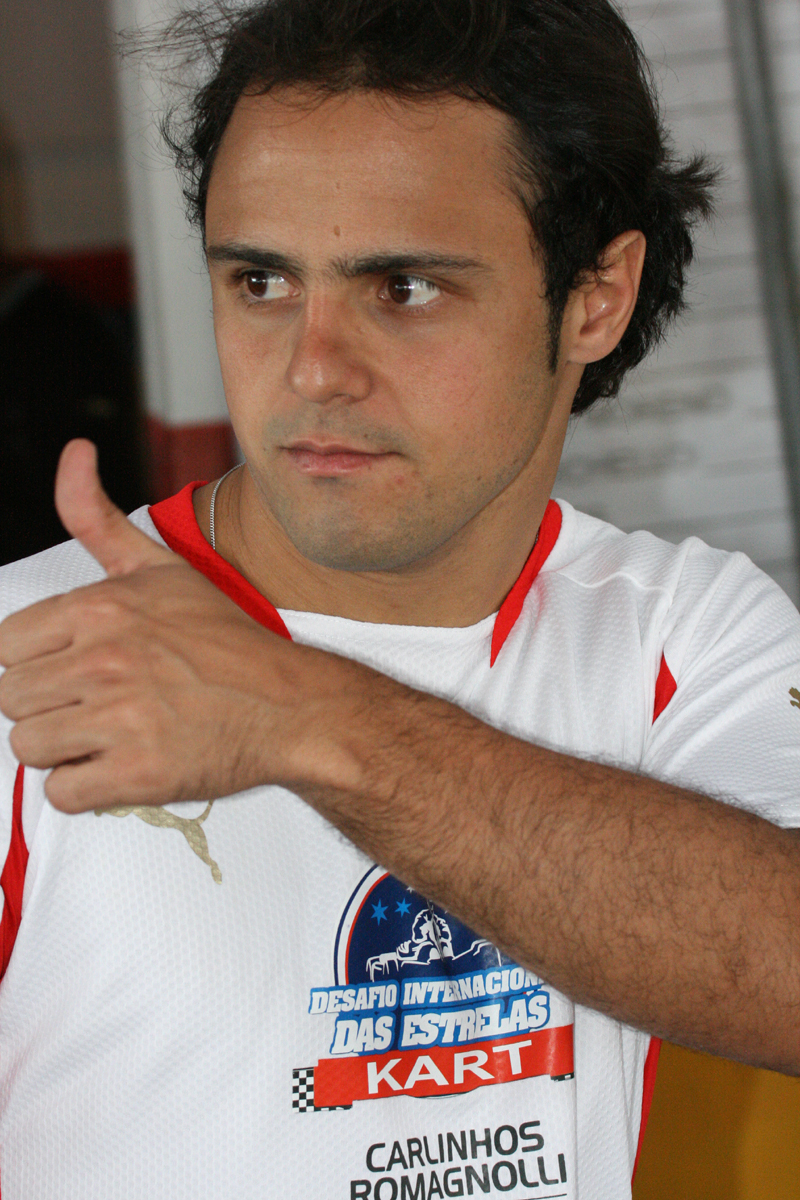
Felipe Massa (pictured in 2007) returned to drive for Sauber after missing the United States Grand Prix to avoid a ten-place grid penalty.

Michael Schumacher had the chance to be the first driver to finish on the podium at every round of the season, and could extend his record for wins in a season to 11. He stated that he hoped to win the Grand Prix so he could start the winter break with a win, adding, "I am definitely on a mission here. Rubens has confirmed second place in the championship now, so here the competition is open. I am going to go flat out. I am not here to make the racing interesting, I am here to win." McLaren's Kimi Räikkönen trained and acclimatised in Hawaii and said of the upcoming race, "I am looking forward to the Japanese Grand Prix, as the track offers a perfect combination of challenges. These include medium and high speed corners, gradient changes and sweeping straights, which make Suzuka exciting to drive and, hopefully, spectate at." Barrichello stated he had enjoyed the season and looked forward to performing decently in Japan. Montoya admitted he would be surprised if his team could compete with Ferrari at Suzuka.

Ten constructors represented by a racing team entered two drivers each for the event. The weekend was the final race for Toyota's Mika Salo and Jaguar's Eddie Irvine. Felipe Massa returned to drive for Sauber after team owner Peter Sauber replaced him with Heinz-Harald Frentzen for the United States Grand Prix to avoid a ten-place grid penalty for colliding with Jaguar's Pedro de la Rosa at the Italian Grand Prix. The Arrows team missed its fifth consecutive Grand Prix due to financial problems that had persisted for three months. Because this was the season's final race, all of the teams were focused on working on their 2003 cars and did not introduce any major technical innovations to Suzuka. McLaren made use of upgraded rear end components for the first time. Honda provided BAR and Jordan with a more powerful engine.

== Practice ==
Two one-hour practice sessions on Friday and two 45-minute sessions on Saturday preceded the race. Conditions for the first practice session on Friday morning were sunny. Michael Schumacher posted the quickest lap time of 1:36.109 just before halfway through the session. His teammate Barrichello, the McLaren duo of Coulthard and Räikkönen, the Williams pair of Montoya and Ralf Schumacher, Irvine, Renault's Jarno Trulli, De la Rosa and Trulli's teammate Jenson Button completed the top ten. 27 minutes into the session, Jacques Villeneuve lost control of his BAR car's rear over the kerbing at the Spoon Curve corner exit, possibly due to a traction control system issue. He veered to the left and spun into the tyre barrier, heavily damaging the vehicle's front and rear and covering the circuit with carbon fibre shards. Villeneuve was unhurt and exited his car unaided. Practice was stopped for ten minutes to allow marshals to clear the debris from the track. When Olivier Panis slowed to check on his teammate Villeneuve's condition, his engine stalled further across the track because he slowed down too much.

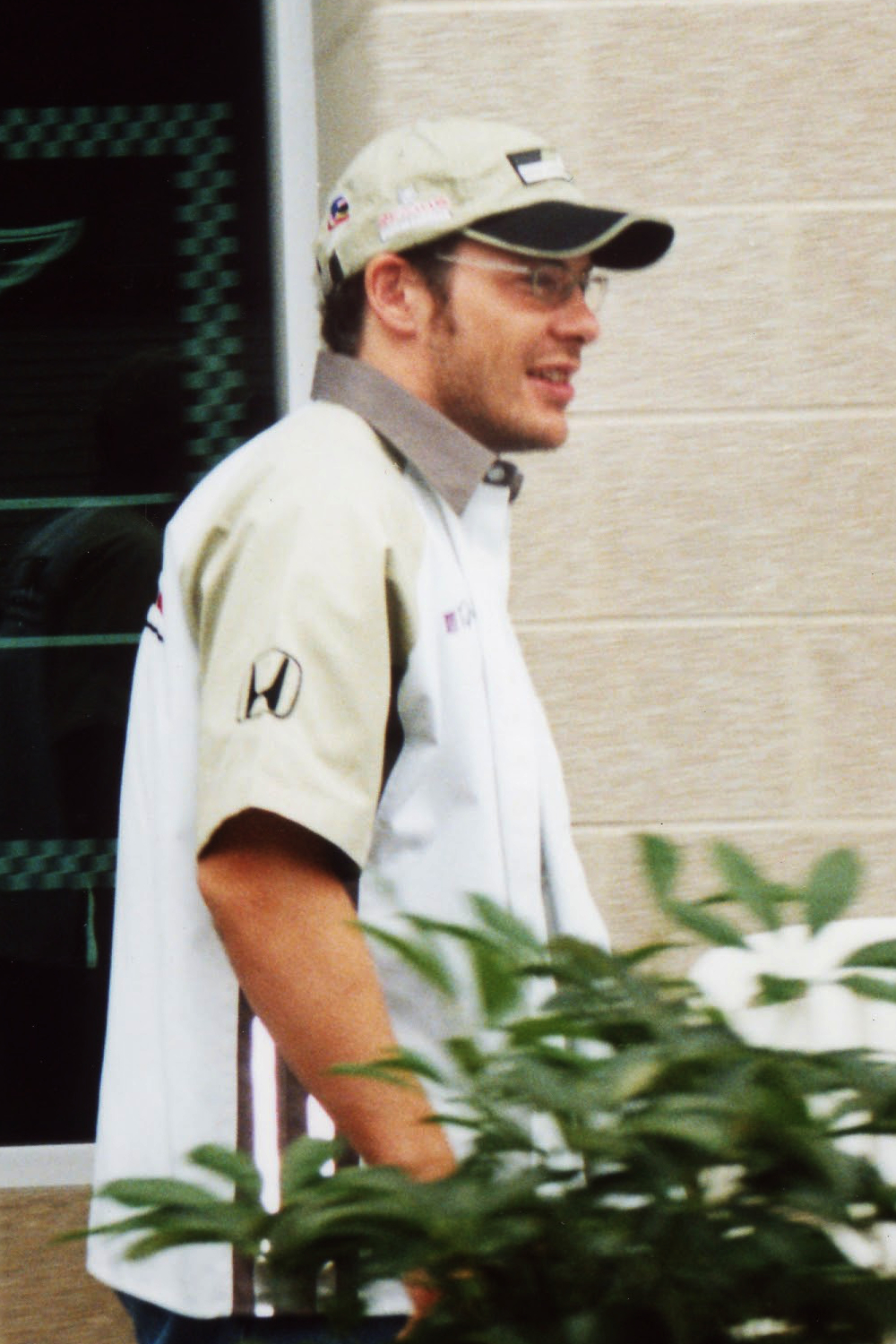
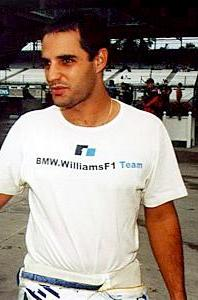
Jacques Villeneuve (left) and Juan Pablo Montoya (right) suffered separate accidents during the Friday free practice sessions

It remained sunny and warm for the second practice session later in the afternoon. Räikkönen set the day's fastest lap of 1:34.232, 0.498 seconds quicker than his teammate Coulthard. Barrichello, the Williams duo of Montoya and Ralf Schumacher, Michael Schumacher, the Jaguar pairing of Irvine and De la Rosa, Trulli and Jordan's Giancarlo Fisichella made up positions three through ten. With 12 minutes remaining, Montoya understeered off the circuit at the tight initial right-hand Degner Curve turn and collided with the tyre wall at the next turn with the car's left-hand side at high speed, severely damaging the rear and left-hand side. Although he admitted to feeling sore, Montoya was unhurt. A hydraulic fault limited Michael Schumacher to four laps; Alex Yoong's Minardi car had a hydraulic problem as well as a minor fire under the back. Sato spun into the gravel at Degner Curve turn but returned to the circuit.

The third practice session, held on Saturday morning, was sunny and warm. Michael Schumacher set the first sub-1:33 lap of the weekend with a time of 1:32.978 with 15 minutes remaining. His teammate Barrichello was 0.710 seconds slower in second. Ralf Schumacher, the McLaren team of Coulthard and Räikkönen, Montoya, Trulli, Irvine, Fisichella and Massa rounded out the top ten. After the session ended, Sato's engine failed on the back straight, approaching the 130R corner. Flames poured from the rear of his car but he was unhurt. Toyota's Allan McNish entered the pit lane after his engine failed, limiting him to four laps.

The final practice session took place in sunny weather. Michael Schumacher did not improve his lap time from the previous sesion, although he remained fastest overall. Ralf Schumacher moved from third to second place by 0.255 seconds on the fastest lap time. Following in the top ten were Räikkönen, Montoya, Coulthard, Barrichello, Irvine, Sato, Button and Massa. Panis stopped at the exit from under the bridge (crossover) with 20 minutes to go because of a possible gearbox fault. Minardi's Mark Webber stopped on the straight past the hairpin in the final minute due to a broken gearbox input shaft.

== Qualifying ==
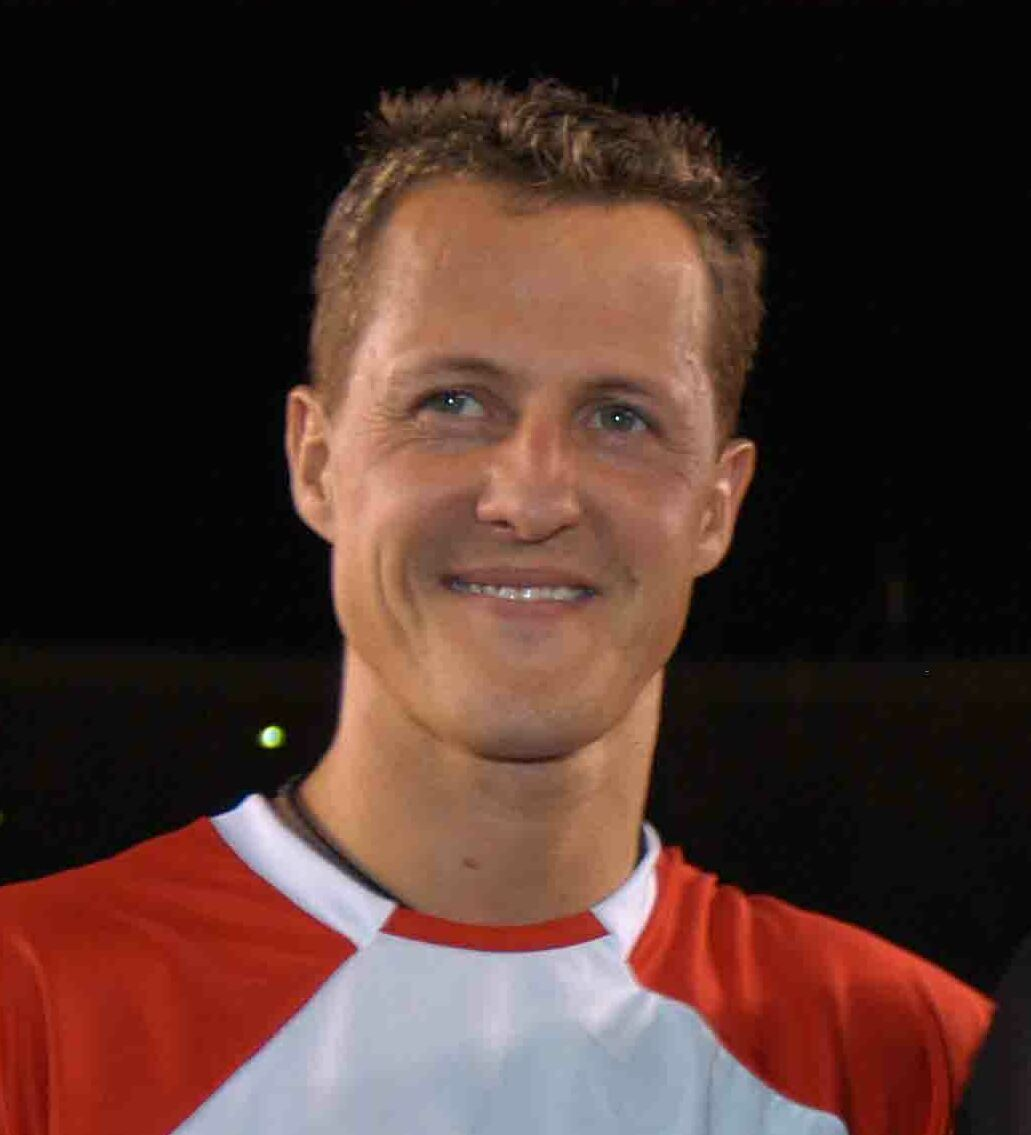
Michael Schumacher (pictured in 2005), the 2000 Formula One Drivers' Champion.

Each driver was allowed twelve laps during Saturday's one-hour qualifying session, with starting positions determined by the drivers' quickest laps. During this session, the 107% rule was in effect, requiring each driver to remain within 107% of the quickest lap time in order to qualify for the race. Qualifying took place in fine conditions. Michael Schumacher was fastest after his first flying lap, then lowered his time to 1:31.317 to clinch his seventh pole position of the season and 50th overall. He believed he might have lapped faster after adjusting his racing setup for his final run. Barrichello was 0.432 seconds slower than his teammate; he secured second with his final quick lap, where he ran wide at turn three and rode the kerbing. Coulthard was faster due to the colder temperatures and took third using a scrubbed set of tyres; a minor understeer in the first sector kept him from going faster on his final run. Räikkönen's final-minute lap landed him fourth despite running wide at turn one. The spare McLaren was prepared for him by mechanics due to a minor issue with the car's pneumatics telemetry system trace. This did not become an issue, as Räikkönen did not need the spare car. Ralf Schumacher, fifth, had an inconsistent car balance, while Montoya, sixth, experienced understeer and oversteer and ran wide attempting to lap quicker at the end of qualifying. Sato took seventh in the last seconds of qualifying, his highest result of the season. Fisichella, his teammate, finished eighth despite minor troubles with the automatic shifter downchange mechanism and minor balancing issues through the esses behind the pit lane. Villeneuve was ninth and was baulked by Montoya during a run. In his final qualifying session for Renault, Button claimed tenth on his final run despite an error into the chicane that sent him sideways. Trulli was dissatisfied with his car's handling and secured 11th on his first run, being demoted out of the top ten by his teammate Button. Heidfeld did not have four clear runs and made errors, as well as experiencing graining on the front tyres following the Spoon Curve corner, finishing 12th. Salo was 13th after collecting grass on his tyres when Ralf Schumacher ran wide ahead of him during his final run.

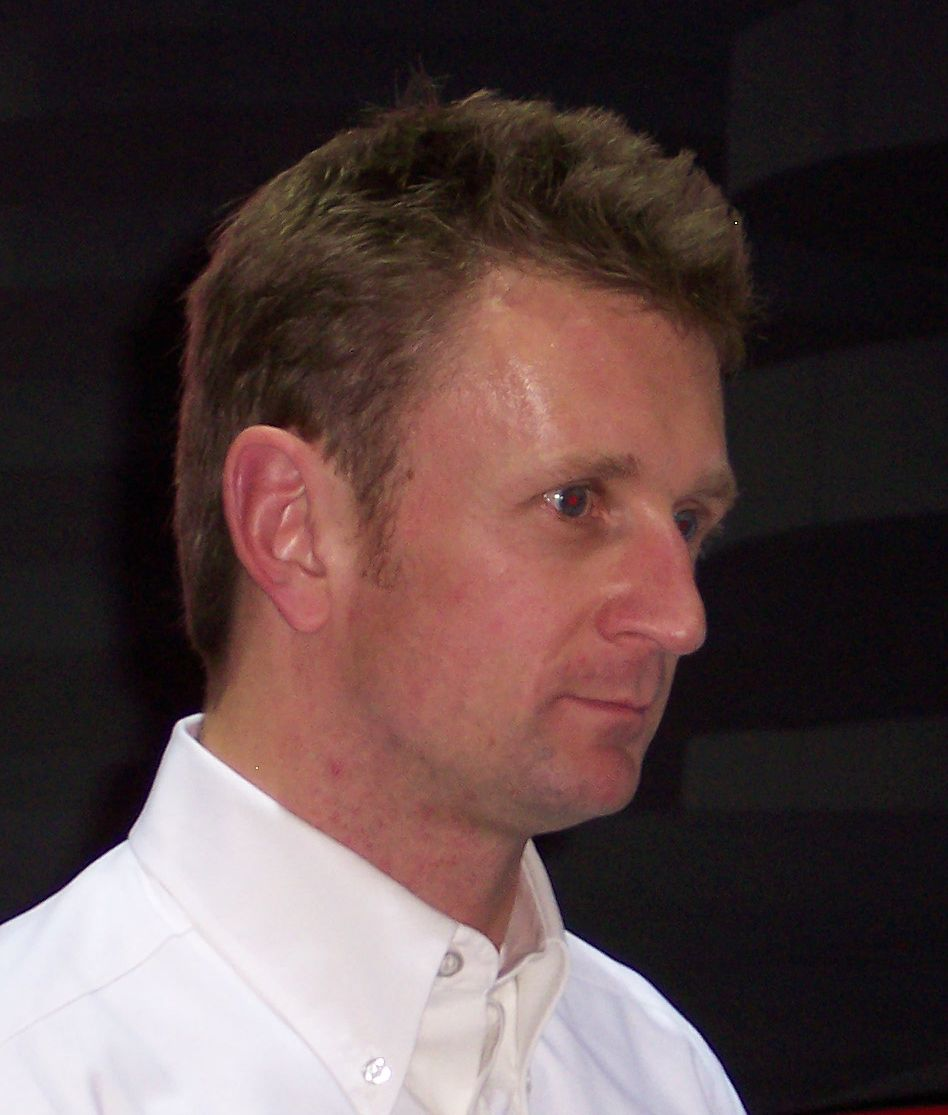
Allan McNish (pictured in 2006) suffered a major accident in qualifying that led to his withdrawal from the event.

Irvine's engine suddenly failed midway round the circuit in the final ten minutes, prematurely ending his qualifying session and started from 14th. Massa in 15th got graining on his tyres and had excess understeer at the chicane as a result on his fastest run. Panis pulled off the circuit just before the pit lane exit with a gearbox fault. He returned to drive the spare BAR car and took 16th. De la Rosa's Jaguar lacked grip, despite improving balance with each run, leaving him 17th. In his final race for Toyota, McNish was 18th. 35 minutes into qualifying, he lost control of the Toyota's rear at the exit to the 130R corner, hurtling backwards airborne over the run-off area and into the outside Armco barrier when he used opposite lock to restore control. McNish smashed through the tyre wall and metal barrier at great speed, destroying the barrier and a substantial portion of the Toyota's rear, which rested on the outside grass bank. The car vaulted the barrier, having broken its two top rails, and stopped at the other side of it resting upright after hitting an earth bank. McNish exited the Toyota unaided but had a limp. Sid Watkins, medical delegate for the Fédération Internationale de l'Automobile (FIA; Formula One's governing body), conducted a precautionary check on him at the track's medical centre. Qualifying was stopped for 75 minutes to allow marshals to repair the barriers and clear debris from McNish's car off the circuit. McNish was advised to not participate in the rest of qualifying due to a mild concussion and a bruised knee; the fact that he escaped major harm because he crashed backwards was credited to safety measures adopted following the fatalities of Roland Ratzenberger and Ayrton Senna at the 1994 San Marino Grand Prix. The Minardi team completed the starting order. Webber took 19th on the prime Michelin tyre compound, while teammate Yoong claimed 20th on the option compound despite minor oversteer in the high-speed corners during his final two runs.

=== Qualifying classification ===
Pos	No	Driver	Constructor	Lap	Gap	Grid
1	1	(Germany) Michael Schumacher	Ferrari	1:31.317	—	1
2	2	(Brazil) Rubens Barrichello	Ferrari	1:31.749	+0.432	2
3	3	(United Kingdom) David Coulthard	McLaren-Mercedes	1:32.088	+0.771	3
4	4	(Finland) Kimi Räikkönen	McLaren-Mercedes	1:32.197	+0.880	4
5	5	(Germany) Ralf Schumacher	Williams-BMW	1:32.444	+1.127	5
6	6	(Colombia) Juan Pablo Montoya	Williams-BMW	1:32.507	+1.190	6
7	10	(Japan) Takuma Sato	Jordan-Honda	1:33.090	+1.773	7
8	9	(Italy) Giancarlo Fisichella	Jordan-Honda	1:33.276	+1.959	8
9	11	(Canada) Jacques Villeneuve	BAR-Honda	1:33.349	+2.032	9
10	15	(United Kingdom) Jenson Button	Renault	1:33.429	+2.112	10
11	14	(Italy) Jarno Trulli	Renault	1:33.547	+2.230	11
12	7	(Germany) Nick Heidfeld	Sauber-Petronas	1:33.553	+2.236	12
13	24	(Finland) Mika Salo	Toyota	1:33.742	+2.425	13
14	16	(United Kingdom) Eddie Irvine	Jaguar-Cosworth	1:33.915	+2.598	14
15	8	(Brazil) Felipe Massa	Sauber-Petronas	1:33.979	+2.662	15
16	12	(France) Olivier Panis	BAR-Honda	1:34.192	+2.875	16
17	17	(Spain) Pedro de la Rosa	Jaguar-Cosworth	1:34.227	+2.910	17
18	25	(United Kingdom) Allan McNish	Toyota	1:35.191	+3.874	—
19	23	(Australia) Mark Webber	Minardi-Asiatech	1:35.958	+4.641	18
20	22	(Malaysia) Alex Yoong	Minardi-Asiatech	1:36.267	+4.950	19
107% time: 1:37.709

== Warm-up ==
On race morning, teams had a 30-minute warm-up session to fine-tune their cars for the race in sunny weather. Michael Schumacher set the pace with his first quick lap before dropping to 1:36.249. He was 0.401 seconds quicker than his teammate Barrichello, followed by the McLaren duo of Räikkönen and Coulthard, Ralf Schumacher, Trulli, Massa, Fisichella, Salo, and Villeneuve. Fisichella spun rear-first into the gravel between the first two turns and had to abandon his car. Ralf Schumacher raced wide, took too much kerb, and lost control of his car's rear at the Degner Curve. He spun 360 degrees before freeing himself from the gravel trap with five minutes left. When Montoya noticed Schumacher on the inside, he deliberately ran wide to avoid colliding with him.

After the warm-up session, McNish failed Watkins' medical examination. Watkins advised McNish to withdraw from the race, and Toyota did so as a precaution since the bruising on his right knee had swelled overnight and needed to be cut open.

== Race ==
The 53-lap race began before a crowd of 155,000 spectators at 14:30 local time. The conditions on the grid were dry and sunny with the air temperature between 21 to 28 °C (70 to 82 °F) and the asphalt temperature between 30 to 38 °C (86 to 100 °F). Fisichella's engine failed during a reconnaissance lap 20 minutes before the start, preventing him from reaching the starting grid. He returned to the pit lane to drive his teammate Sato's spare Jordan car setup, which lacked the more powerful Honda engine. Jordan mechanics on the grid tried to tailor the backup vehicle to Fisichella's preferences.

When the lights went out to start the race, Michael Schumacher made a clean getaway to maintain his pole position advantage entering the first corner's braking area. Barrichello weaved twice to keep second from Coulthard, who attempted to draw alongside him on the inside into turn one. Ralf Schumacher made a quick start, passing Räikkönen on the outside for fourth into turn one. Trulli made a fast getaway, moving from 11th to eighth by the end of the first lap, while Fisichella slid from eighth to 11th and Villeneuve fell from ninth to 14th over the same distance. At the conclusion of lap one, Michael Schumacher led his teammate Barrichello by 2.2 seconds. After them came Coulthard, Ralf Schumacher, Räikkönen, and Montoya. Michael Schumacher began to pull away from the rest of the field. On lap two, Villeneuve passed Massa in the first turn at the end of the start/finish straight for 13th. Yoong overtook Webber for 18th on lap three while De la Rosa passed Panis for 16th on the next lap.

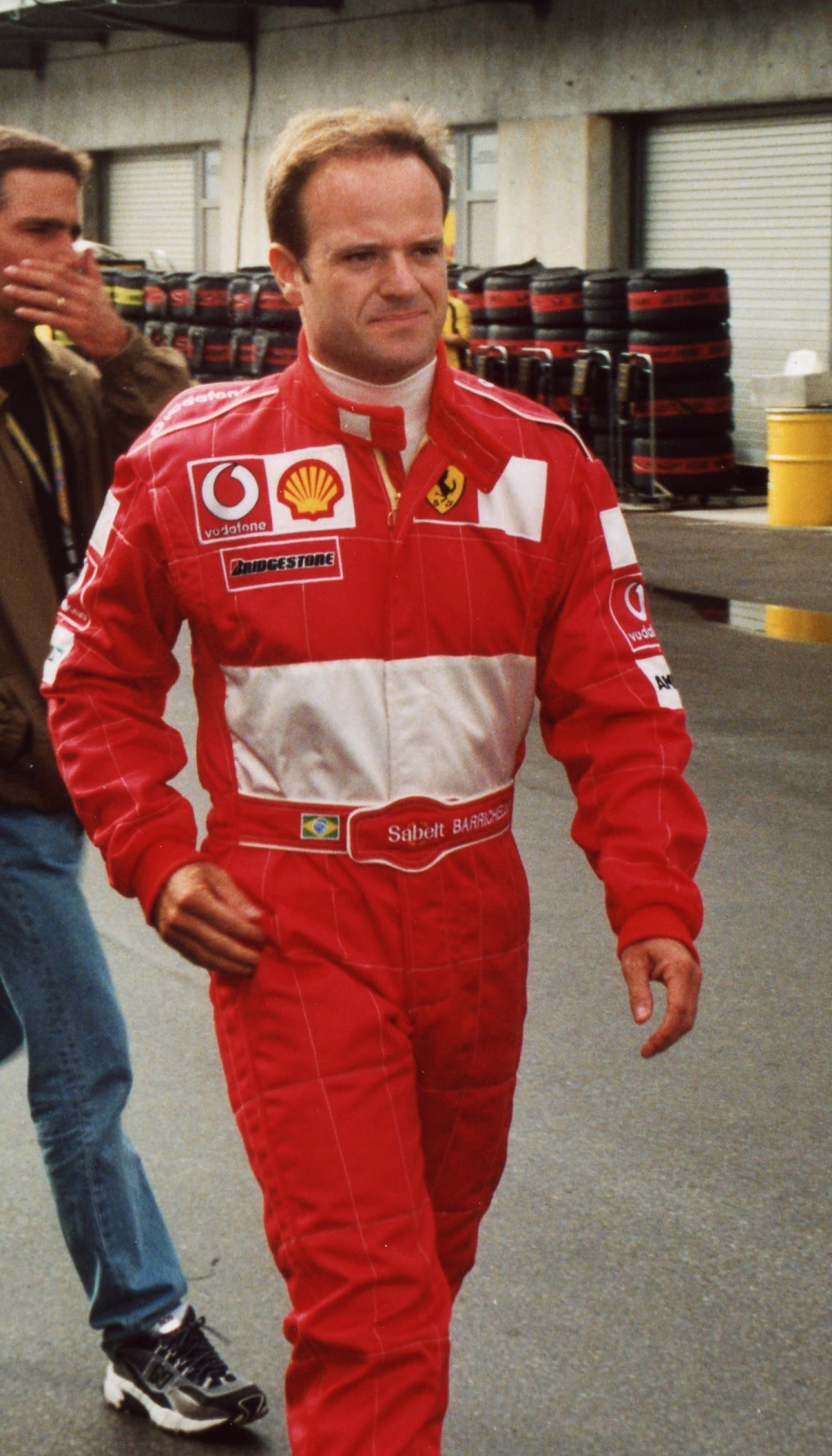
Rubens Barrichello was 0.506 seconds behind his teammate Michael Schumacher at the end of the race in second.

Michael Schumacher's lead over teammate Barrichello had increased to 3.3 seconds at the start of lap four, because Barrichello had issues with the Ferrari grounding its plank under a big fuel load. On the same lap, Massa got too close to Villeneuve's car, losing downforce and understeering wide at the first Denger Curve exit curve. Massa crashed into the tyre barrier at 112 mph (180 km/h) after clipping the kerb entering the second Degner Curve. removing the front wing. He was unhurt but the crash made him the race's first retirement. On lap five, Panis slowed due to a car vibration and fell to the back of the field. He entered the pit lane for the BAR engineers to reset the electronics, but this did not resolve the issue. Panis retired after attempting to resume racing a lap later. Coulthard slowed from third place at turn nine on lap seven after the throttle actuator malfunctioned due to an electrical failure, causing one side of the control system's five-cylinder bank to fail. He went off the racing line and entered the McLaren garage to retire. Coulthard's retirement promoted Ralf Schumacher to third, Räikkönen to fourth, Montoya to fifth and Sato to sixth.

Yoong was driving without power steering and spun at the Spoon Curve hairpin on lap nine, falling behind teammate Webber. Ferrari's Michael Schumacher and Barrichello were lapping almost a second faster than Ralf Schumacher, extending their advantage to 18 seconds by lap 15. On lap 16, Yoong spun for the third time, getting stuck in the turn two gravel trap and retired. The first round of pit stops began on lap 16. Renault sent Trulli and his teammate Button to the pit lane, anticipating them to be able to drive quicker without aerodynamic turbulence and attempt to pass Sato in sixth, but they realised they could not do so on the track. Michael Schumacher was the first of the leaders to make a pit stop on lap 20. His stop lasted 9.4 seconds, and he fell to second, behind teammate Barrichello but ahead of Ralf Schumacher, who was 25 seconds behind. Barrichello led one lap before making his first pit stop on lap 22. He fell to fourth, behind Ralf Schumacher and Räikkönen. Räikkönen and Ralf Schumacher made their pit stops over the next three laps, rejoining in fourth and third.

After the pit stops had been completed, the race order was Michael Schumacher, his teammate Barrichello, Ralf Schumacher, Räikkönen, Montoya and the three-stopping Trulli. Sato had dropped behind the Renaults of Trulli and Button and was eighth. The main focus of attention was the battle between Fisichella and Villeneuve for 11th. Villeneuve appeared to be quicker on the straights, and unsuccessfully attempted to pass Fisichella at the Esses on lap 26. Fisichella cut the chicane on lap 27 but gained no advantage. On lap 28, Villeneuve's engine failed after the pit lane entry, forcing him to retire in front of the grandstand. This allowed Fisichella to battle Salo for tenth. Montoya moved ahead of Trulli by 9.5 seconds and was gradually gaining on Räikkönen.

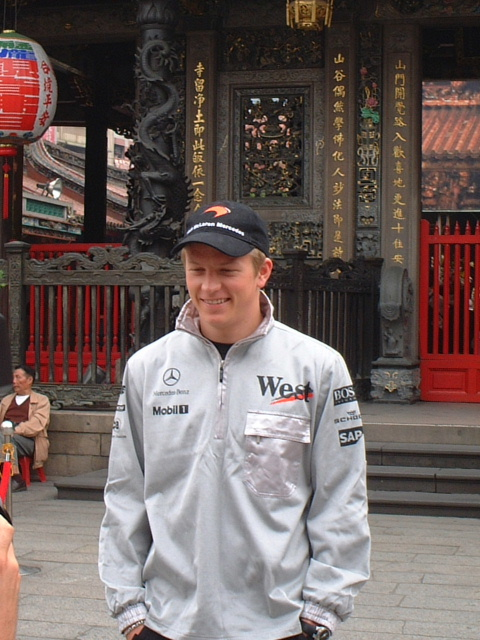
Kimi Räikkönen finished in third for his fourth podium result of the season after Ralf Schumacher's engine failed with five laps remaining.

The second round of pit stops began on lap 33. On the same lap, Räikkönen ran wide into the gravel trap at Denger Curve corner but he remained fourth. Trulli retired off track from sixth on the next lap due to a fuel system failure at the crossover on lap 34. Sato was promoted back to sixth and made a pit stop on lap 37, keeping his position after rejoining the track. On the next lap, Barrichello was the first of the leading five to make his second pit stop. He returned to the circuit in third, behind Ralf Schumacher. Michael Schumacher made his second and last pit stop of the season on the same lap. His eight-second stop kept him in the lead. On lap 39, Fisichella's engine failed at the exit to the Spoon Curve corner and he retired from the race. Ralf Schumacher made his pit stop from second on lap 40 and his 6.9-second stop dropped him to fifth, behind Räikkönen. On the following lap, De la Rosa went off the circuit at the hairpin with a sudden transmission failure. Räikkönen, in third, was the final driver to complete his second pit stop on lap 42, returning to the race in fourth ahead of Montoya.

Following the second round of pit stops, the race order was Michael Schumacher, his teammate Barrichello, Ralf Schumacher, Räikkönen, Montoya and Sato, who was pulling clear of Button in seventh, after being given extra front wing angle by James Key, his race engineer, and Jordan sporting director Gary Anderson to increase downforce and therefore pace. Sato slid sideways in the Spoon Curve turn on lap 46 despite being told by his engineers to slow down to conserve the engine. He regained control of his car and kept sixth. Three laps later, Ralf Schumacher stopped at the Denger Curves due to a sudden engine failure. His retirement elevated Räikkönen to third, Montoya to fourth, Sato to fifth and Button to sixth. Michael Schumacher slowed, allowing his teammate Barrichello to catch up in the last laps. He held the lead for the remainder of the race, winning his 11th of the season and 64th of his career. Michael Schumacher became the first driver to finish on the podium at each Grand Prix of the season. Ferrari won for the 15th time that season, matching McLaren's record set in 1988. Barrichello finished 0.506 seconds behind in second. Räikkönen experienced fly-by-wire throttle problems on lap 48, causing him to slow in the final laps. He finished third, his fourth podium of the season. Montoya finished fourth after adjusting his front wing during his first pit stop. Sato won his first championship points of his career and only of the season in fifth, helping Jordan claim sixth in the World Constructors' Championship. Button completed the points scorers in sixth in his final race for Renault. Heidfeld finished seventh, improving his handling during the first two stints but deteriorating in the last stint. Salo was eighth due to significant understeer on his final set of tyres and a sensor failure resolved by bi-directional telemetry. Irvine finished ninth, citing a lack of car grip. Webber had low grip and was tenth. Ralf Schumacher was the final classified finisher despite his engine failure.

=== Post-race ===
The top three drivers appeared on the podium to collect their trophies and spoke to the media in the subsequent press conference. Michael Schumacher spoke of his season, "We have finished all the races and not only that, but all on the podium and that shows the quality of job the mechanics have done. It is unbelievable what they have achieved." Barrichello noted that he had to be cautious because the Ferrari bottomed out a lot in the opening laps of the race, but added that he was thrilled for himself and Ferrari. He and Michael Schumacher had become Formula One's most successful partnership, "as we have had such a great season, and I have two wins from the last three races, it is just a great achievement for me." Räikkönen indicated that his car problem late in the Grand Prix forced him to slow on the back straight and into the chicane, adding, "Ralf then had some kind of problem with the engine or something and I was a bit lucky. But if I am lucky once a year then it is not a bad thing." He expressed satisfaction that the problem had been resolved.

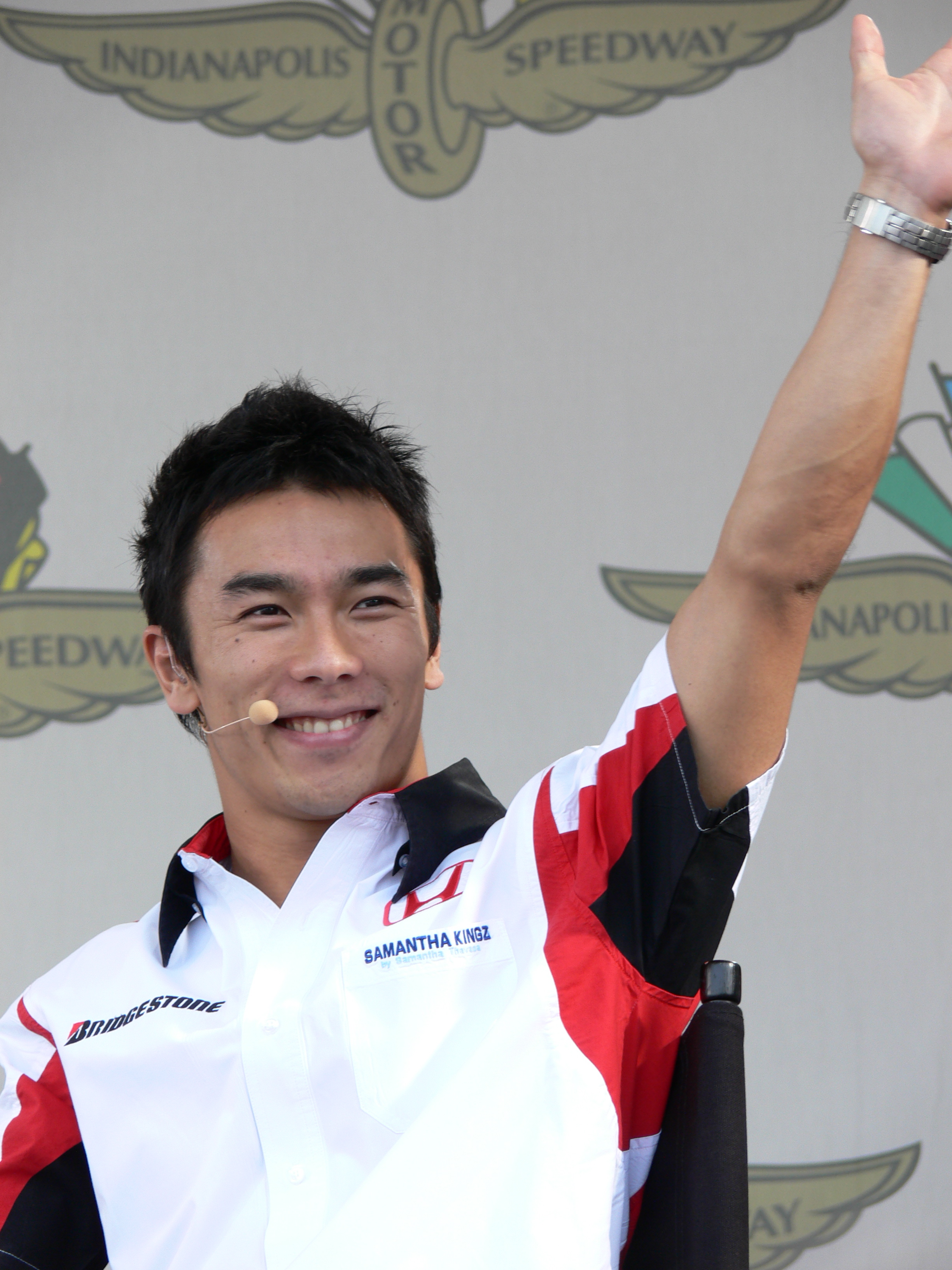
Takuma Sato (pictured in 2006) scored the first two championship points of his career with a fifth-place finish.

Montoya expressed his joy at finishing third in the World Drivers' Championship in his second Formula One season, but his one regret was that he did not win any races. Sato was the first Japanese driver to score a championship point in Japan since Aguri Suzuki took third for Lola-Lamborghini and Satoru Nakajima placed sixth for Tyrrell at the 1990 Japanese Grand Prix. Sato said, "That was incredible! One point was what I was after, but I scored two, which is excellent for the team. The crowd was unbelievable, waving at me on every single lap. I saw everything! This is one of the best feelings in my life." Jordan team owner Eddie Jordan admitted that he did not expect Sato to finish fifth, "He drove a perfect race and he showed the talent I've been telling everyone about." He added, "The fans drove him on and it is great for them because suddenly they have got a Japanese star who can really do the business in Grand Prix racing. This is great."

Button expressed satisfaction with scoring one championship point for Renault, stating that despite the challenging season, it was beneficial and wished the team well for the 2003 season. Ferrari sporting director Jean Todt described the race as a "dream finale to a dream season" and that in compiling his own shortlist of Ferrari's achievements in the 2002 season, he said, "We could not ask for more." FIA president Max Mosley highlighted the Grand Prix as an example of the requirement to rewrite the Formula One sporting regulations following Michael Schumacher's win. He questioned why Europeans would watch the race on television early in the morning after Schumacher's pole position run in qualifying. Coulthard expressed his desire to have concluded the season with a podium, which he believe could have been achieved.

Michael Schumacher finished the season with a season-record 144 World Drivers' Championship points, 21 more than the previous year's total. He defeated runner-up Barrichello by 67 championship points, setting a record. Montoya finished fourth, securing third place with 50 championship points, while Ralf Schumacher finished fourth with 42. Coulthard was fifth overall with 41 championship points, his lowest finish since seventh in the 1996 season. Ferrari scored 221 championship points in the World Constructors' Championship, as many as the other ten teams combined. Williams was second with 92 championship points, while McLaren was third with 65.

=== Race classification ===
Drivers who scored championship points are denoted in bold.

Pos	No	Driver	Constructor	Tyre	Laps	Time/Retired	Grid	Points
1	1	(Germany) **Michael Schumacher**	**Ferrari**	B	53	1:26:59.698	1	10
2	2	(Brazil) **Rubens Barrichello**	**Ferrari**	B	53	+0.506	2	6
3	4	(Finland) **Kimi Räikkönen**	**McLaren-Mercedes**	M	53	+23.292	4	4
4	6	(Colombia) **Juan Pablo Montoya**	**Williams-BMW**	M	53	+36.275	6	3
5	10	(Japan) **Takuma Sato**	**Jordan-Honda**	B	53	+1:22.694	7	2
6	15	(United Kingdom) **Jenson Button**	**Renault**	M	52	+1 lap	10	1
7	7	(Germany) Nick Heidfeld	Sauber-Petronas	B	52	+1 lap	12	
8	24	(Finland) Mika Salo	Toyota	M	52	+1 lap	13	
9	16	(United Kingdom) Eddie Irvine	Jaguar-Cosworth	M	52	+1 lap	14	
10	23	(Australia) Mark Webber	Minardi-Asiatech	M	51	+2 laps	18	
11	5	(Germany) Ralf Schumacher	Williams-BMW	M	48	Engine	5	
Ret	17	(Spain) Pedro de la Rosa	Jaguar-Cosworth	M	39	Transmission	17	
Ret	9	(Italy) Giancarlo Fisichella	Jordan-Honda	B	37	Engine	8	
Ret	14	(Italy) Jarno Trulli	Renault	M	32	Mechanical	11	
Ret	11	(Canada) Jacques Villeneuve	BAR-Honda	B	27	Engine	9	
Ret	22	(Malaysia) Alex Yoong	Minardi-Asiatech	M	14	Spun off	19	
Ret	12	(France) Olivier Panis	BAR-Honda	B	8	Mechanical	16	
Ret	3	(United Kingdom) David Coulthard	McLaren-Mercedes	M	7	Throttle	3	
Ret	8	(Brazil) Felipe Massa	Sauber-Petronas	B	3	Accident	15	
DNS	25	(United Kingdom) Allan McNish	Toyota	M	—	Injured in qualifying	—	

== Championship standings after the race ==
Drivers' Championship standings

+/–	Pos	Driver	Points
	1	(Germany) Michael Schumacher*	144
	2	(Brazil) Rubens Barrichello	77
	3	(Colombia) Juan Pablo Montoya	50
	4	(Germany) Ralf Schumacher	42
	5	(United Kingdom) David Coulthard	41

Constructors' Championship standings

+/–	Pos	Constructor	Points
	1	(Italy) Ferrari*	221
	2	(United Kingdom) Williams-BMW	92
	3	(United Kingdom) McLaren-Mercedes	65
	4	(France) Renault	23
	5	(Switzerland) Sauber-Petronas	11
Sources:

- Note: Only the top five positions are included for both sets of standings.
- Bold text and an asterisk indicates the 2002 World Champions.

Previous race: 2002 United States Grand Prix	FIA Formula One World Championship; 2002 season	Next race: 2003 Australian Grand Prix
Previous race: 2001 Japanese Grand Prix	Japanese Grand Prix	Next race: 2003 Japanese Grand Prix
