= 1990 in motorsport =

The following is an overview of the events of 1990 in motorsport including the major racing events, motorsport venues that were opened and closed during a year, championships and non-championship events that were established and disestablished in a year, and births and deaths of racing drivers and other motorsport people.

== Annual events ==
The calendar includes only annual major non-championship events or annual events that had significance separate from the championship. For the dates of the championship events see related season articles.

Date	Event	Ref
25 December-16 January	12th Dakar Rally	
3–4 February	28th 24 Hours of Daytona	
18 February	32nd Daytona 500	
27 May	48th Monaco Grand Prix	
27 May	74th Indianapolis 500	
28 May-8 June	73rd Isle of Man TT	
16–17 June	58th 24 Hours of Le Mans	
16–17 June	18th 24 Hours of Nurburgring	
21–22 July	42nd 24 Hours of Spa	
29 July	13th Suzuka 8 Hours	
30 September	31st Tooheys 1000	
25 November	37th Macau Grand Prix	
8–9 December	3rd Race of Champions	

== Births ==
Date	Month	Name	Nationality	Occupation	Note	Ref
2	January	Karel Abraham	Czech	Motorcycle racer	MotoGP competitor	
25	April	Jean-Éric Vergne	French	Racing driver	FIA Formula E Championship winner (2017-18).	
9	July	Earl Bamber	New Zealand	Racing driver	24 Hours of Le Mans winner (2015, 2017). FIA World Endurance champion (2017).	

== Deaths ==
Date	Month	Name	Age	Nationality	Occupation	Note	Ref
26	January	Bob Gerard	76	British	Racing driver	One of the first British Formula One drivers.	
24	May	Dries van der Lof	70	Dutch	Racing driver	One of the first Dutch Formula One drivers.	
25	August	David Hampshire	72	British	Racing driver	One of the first British Formula One drivers.	

== See also ==
- List of 1990 motorsport champions
