= List of Malaysian police officers killed in the line of duty =

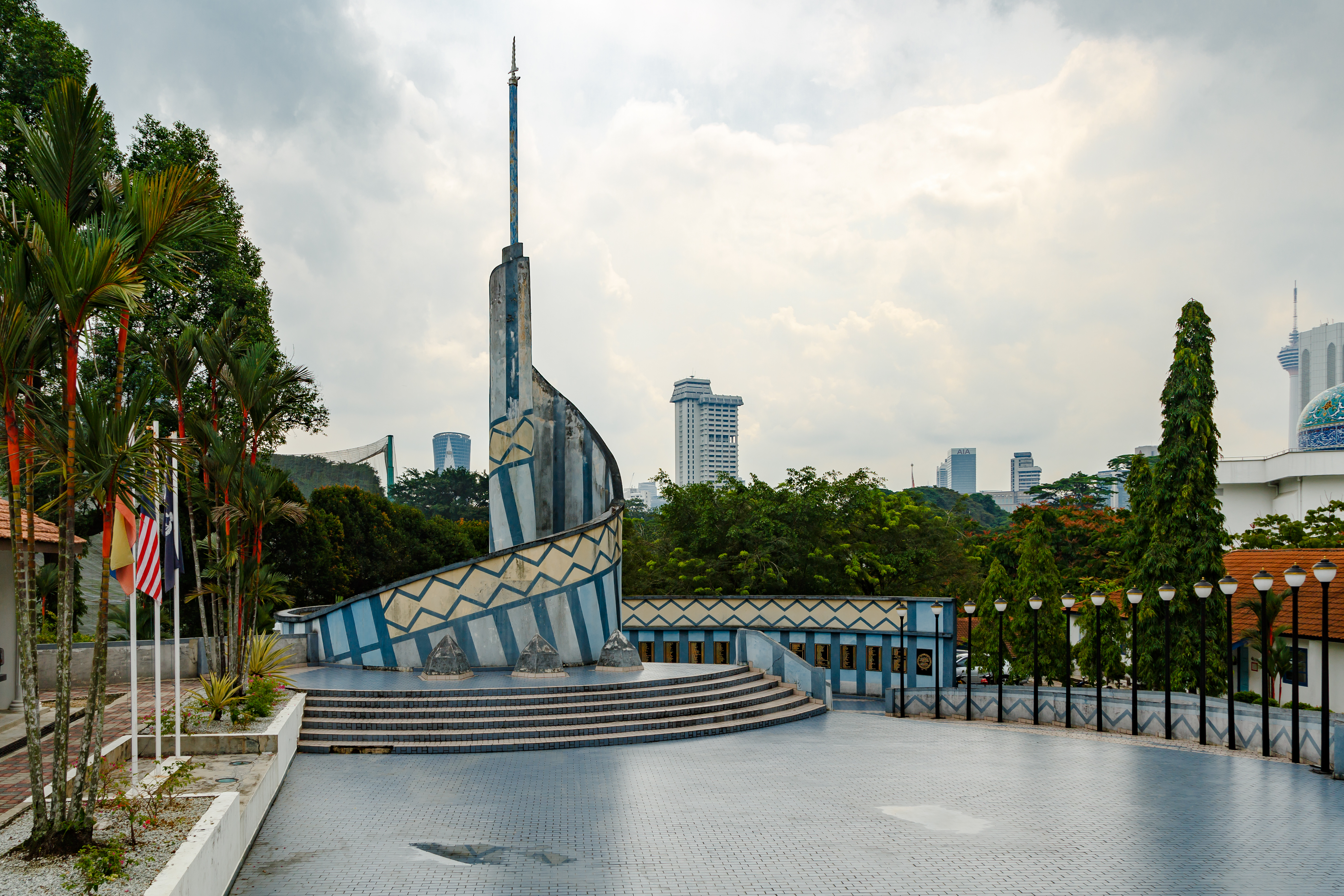
The Warrior's Square (Malay: Dataran Perwira) is the monument for the Malaysian police officers killed in the line of duty. The memorial was set aside on the compound in the RMP Museum.

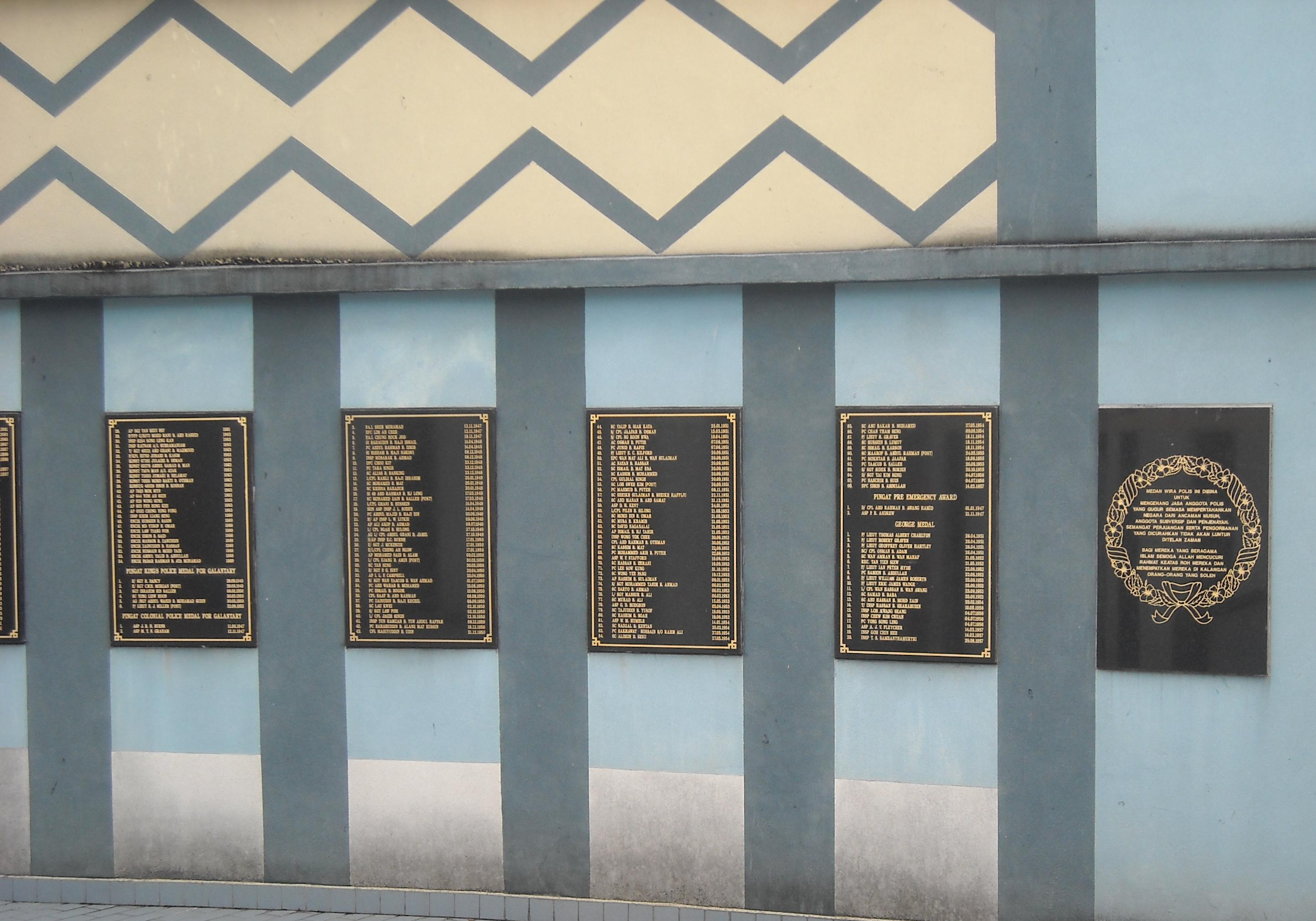
Outside the Police Museum Centre, mounted on a board on the wall known as Warrior Square (Malay: Dataran Perwira), are the names of all Malaysian police officers killed in the line of duty since the 1940s.

This is a list of police officers from the Royal Malaysia Police who were killed in the line of duty, based on official records from the year 1915 to date. Line of duty deaths refers to any police officer who died while carrying out the duty that they were obligated and/or authorised to carry out. This would include officers who responded to incidents while off-duty as obligated by the Police Force Act 1967, as well as those commuting to and from their place of duty or training.

== Trends ==
=== Causes of death ===
Cause of death	1910s	1940s	1950s	1960s	1970s	1980s	1990s	2000s	2010s	2020s to date	Total to date
Murder/Culpable homicide (with firearms/explosions)	0	8	161	19	23	5	1	4	10	0	231
Murder/Culpable homicide (with sharp object)	1	0	0	0	5	0	2	1	1	0	10
Murder/Culpable homicide (with blunt object)	0	0	0	0	0	0	0	0	1	0	1
Murder/Culpable homicide (other/unspecified)	0	0	0	0	1	0	1	0	1	0	3
Accidental death (traffic accident)	0	2	0	0	0	0	11	16	16	0	45
Accidental death (drowning)	0	0	1	0	0	0	0	1	0	0	2
Accidental death (weapon mishandling)	0	0	0	0	0	4	0	2	2	0	8
Accidental death (Other)	0	0	1	0	0	0	15	2	2	0	20
Natural causes	0	0	0	0	0	0	0	5	2	0	7
Cause of death not recorded		26	723	8	102	34	13	0	0	0	906
Total	1	34	885	27	131	43	43	31	35	0	1,230

=== Victims' profile ===
Age	1910s	1940s	1950s	1960s	1970s	1980s	1990s	2000s	2010s	2020s to date	Total to date
18-20	0	0	0	0	0	0	1	1	0	0	3
21–25	0	1	0	0	0	0	1	4	2	0	8
26–30	0	1	1	0	0	2	0	4	3	0	11
31–35	0	0	0	0	0	1	1	4	7	0	13
36–40	0	0	0	0	0	2	0	3	2	0	7
41–45	0	0	1	0	0	1	0	3	1	0	6
46–50	0	0	0	0	1	0	1	5	4	0	11
51–55	0	0	0	0	0	0	0	2	5	0	8
56–60	0	0	0	0	0	0	0	0	2	0	2
Not recorded	1	32	883	27	127	56	24	5	0	0	1,155

The ethnic profile of police officers has been traditionally disproportionate compared to the national ethnic profile, with a significantly higher proportion of ethnic Malays, especially in the earlier decades. However, the number of casualties involving ethnic Malay police officers is statistically higher overall due in part to the high mortality rates involving the ethnic Malay community during the Malayan Emergency in the 1950-1970s, and in part to the ethnic composition of the police force.

Ethnicity	1910s	1940s	1950s	1960s	1970s	1980s	1990s	2000s	2010s	2020s to date	Total to date
Malay	1	29	769	19	101	33	25	24	20	2	1,023
Chinese	0	3	61	7	21	6	1	1	1	0	101
Indian	0	1	17	1	3	2	0	3	0	0	27
Eurasians/Other	0	24	31	0	5	16	1	4	6	0	87

Rank	1910s	1940s	1950s	1960s	1970s	1980s	1990s	2000s	2010s	2020s to date	Total to date
Police Constable	0	64	224	23	90	38	19	8	2	2	470
Police Constable (PVR)	—	—	1	0	1	0	0	2	0	0	4
Extra Police Constable	0	1	55	0	5	0	0	1	2	0	64
Special Constable	0	19	493	—	—	—	—	—	—	—	512
Auxiliary police	0	2	44	0	0	0	0	4	0	0	50
Lance Corporal	0	0	14	0	0	1	2	11	6	0	34
Corporal	0	1	21	2	8	5	5	5	8	3	58
Sergeant	1	16	10	0	11	2	0	0	5	2	47
Sergeant Major	0	0	2	0	0	0	0	1	0	0	3
Sub-Inspector	0	1	1	0	1	0	0	0	0	0	3
Inspector	0	5	4	1	5	5	0	0	2	0	22
Chief Inspector	0	0	0	1	1	0	0	—	—	0	2
Assistant Superintendent	0	8	10	0	2	5	0	0	1	1	27
Deputy Superintendent	0	0	1	0	1	0	1	0	0	0	3
Superintendent	0	0	0	0	0	0	0	0	1	0	1
Assistant Commissioner	0	0	3	0	0	0	0	0	0	0	3
Deputy Commissioner	0	0	0	0	1	0	0	0	0	0	1
Inspector General of Police	0	0	0	0	1	0	0	0	0	0	1

== Incidents by chronology ==
The following cases are listed by the date of death of the Malaysian police officer, although the incident attributing to death may have occurred earlier. The indicated ranks are at the time of death and do not include posthumous promotions. Ranks/service numbers are colour-coded based on the cause of death as per the following general classifications. Uncoded entries refer to cases whereby incident details are unknown or unclear:

Key
— denotes information is not available.
denotes the officer was killed (Murder or Culpable homicide) using firearms/explosions (including booby trap, grenades, etc).
denotes the officer was killed (Murder or Culpable homicide) via other means (or where the exact weapon used, if any, was not specified).
denotes the officer's death was accidental, including those involving a rash or negligent act.
denotes the officer's death was attributed to natural causes/act of God

== 1910s ==
Date	Rank/no	Name	Age	Division/unit	Circumstance
1915-04-29	Sgt	Che Wan Bin Sulaiman	—	Pasir Puteh	Stabbed to death by Tok Janggut, whose real name was Haji Hassan bin Panglima Mat Munas, a religious teacher from Pasir Puteh, Kelantan, who was one of the first nationalists in Malaya, where they arrested him for failing to pay the government tax. The rebels leader used a kris when he refused to walk in front of them and a fight occurred, in which Tok Janggut managed to stab the sergeant. Sgt Che Wan was the first police officer to die from a sharp object as well as the first police officer to die in the line of duty. This incident began the battle against British forces in Kelantan.

== 1940s ==
Date	Rank/no	Name	Age	Division/unit	Circumstance
1947-06-29	D/SI	Low Yew Fye	—	—	—
1948-04-09	ASP	G.C Sanson	—	—	G.C. Sanson killed by communist forces while performing anti-Communist duties at Kati in Perak
1948-06-16	—	J.M. Allison	—	—	Killed in Sungai Siput which started the Malayan Emergency
1948-06-16	—	A.E. Walker	—	—	Killed in Sungai Siput which started the Malayan Emergency
1948-06-16	AP	I.D. Christian	—	—	Killed in Sungai Siput which started the Malayan Emergency
1948-07-16	SC	(unnamed)	—	—	Approximately 100 Communist Terrorist under the command of Kim Siong attacked the Police Station at Pekan Gua Musang Pahang. The small company of police surrounded and fought the Communist Terrorist for nearly two hours until their ammunition ran out. The Inspector and 14 Constables surrendered and were taken away. During the firefight, one Special Constable was killed.
1948-08-05	AP	J.E. Olgivie	—	—	Killed in Chemor, Perak
1948-08-08	AP	K.W. Burnham	—	—	Killed in Kulim, Kedah
1948-08-11	SC	(unnamed)	—	—	30 CT attacked the Coronation Estate 4 miles away from Kluang. The CT killed the Schoolmaster, a Chinese dresser, and a Malay Special Constable.
1948-08-15	PC 11483	Mohd Taib	22	Jungle Squad	PC 11483 Mohd Taib with 20 Jungle Squad platoon members were directed to carry out a police operation by Kemaman Police Chief, DW Bidin to find the wanted communist leader, Awang Ali, a teacher in the Pasir Raja area. When the platoon leader received a call from HQ, informing him that the communist leader had surrendered in Kuala Lipis Police Station, Pahang, the platoon moved to Jongok Batu to find the remainder of the communists. The platoon was then suddenly ambushed and Mohd Taib who was leading the frontline was shot in the chest by a communist gunman using the Lee–Enfield Mk.III bolt-action rifle. Another gunshot wound near his chest punctured his back and also hit PC 9267, Mohd Shah, 20, the Bren gunner used a sarong to wrap up his wounds before, arriving at the Dungun Hospital for treatment, where he died later.
1948-08-18	PC	(unnamed)	—	—	A platoon of police engaged and ambushed by 40 CT 20 miles away North of Johor Bahru. During the firefight, 4 CTs and 1 PC were killed.
1948-08-28	PC	(unnamed)	—	—	In Negeri Sembilan, 100 Communist Terrorists attacked a village and a nearly Tambah Tin Mine. Killing the manager Mr. J. Hunter and 1 Malay Police Constable.
1948-10-07	SC	(unnamed)	—	—	A number of communist gunmen attacked the Budu Estate near Kuala Lipis and killed 1 Special Constable(unnamed)
1948-10-10	AP/Insp	A.J.F. Penin	—	—	Killed in Tasek Glugor
1948-10-15	Insp I/501	Shamsuddin Bin Mohd Ali	—	—	Killed in an ambush while en route to help patrol members who were under attack by communist gunmen in Changlun, Kedah. Insp. I/501 was the first Police Inspector killed in the line of duty as well as during the Emergency.
1948-10-28	Insp I/520	Mohd Idris bin Chek	—	—	Insp I/520 and 6 Police Constable(unnamed) were ambushed by communist gunmen at 19th Taiping/Selama Road, Perak
1948-10-28	PC	(unnamed)	—	—	Insp I/520 and 6 Police Constable(unnamed) were ambushed by communist gunmen at 19th Taiping/Selama Road, Perak
1948-10-28	PC	(unnamed)	—	—	Insp I/520 and 6 Police Constable(unnamed) were ambushed by communist gunmen at 19th Taiping/Selama Road, Perak
1948-10-28	PC	(unnamed)	—	—	Insp I/520 and 6 Police Constable(unnamed) were ambushed by communist gunmen at 19th Taiping/Selama Road, Perak
1948-10-28	PC	(unnamed)	—	—	Insp I/520 and 6 Police Constable(unnamed) were ambushed by communist gunmen at 19th Taiping/Selama Road, Perak
1948-10-28	PC	(unnamed)	—	—	Insp I/520 and 6 Police Constable(unnamed) were ambushed by communist gunmen at 19th Taiping/Selama Road, Perak
1948-10-28	PC	(unnamed)	—	—	Insp I/520 and 6 Police Constable(unnamed) were ambushed by communist gunmen at 19th Taiping/Selama Road, Perak
1948-11-04	SC	(unnamed)	—	—	Ten communist gunmen ambushed three Special Constables carrying rations to the Police Post at Tapah. One of the SC(unnamed) was killed, and the other two escaped
1948-11-07	PC	Ibrahim bin Manap	—	—	Killed in an operation
1948-11-12	SC	(unnamed)	—	—	3 Malay Special Constable were killed. When a sea mine blew up on Pontian Beach.
1948-11-12	SC	(unnamed)	—	—	3 Malay Special Constable were killed. When a sea mine blew up on Pontian Beach.
1948-11-12	SC	(unnamed)	—	—	3 Malay Special Constable were killed. When a sea mine blew up on Pontian Beach.
1948-11-15	AP	R.H. Best	—	—	Killed in Action in Tanjong Tuallang
1948-11-15	AP	M.S. Urquhart	—	—	Killed in Action in Tanjong Tuallang
1948-11-24	E/Sgt	G.A. Swan	—	—	Killed in an operation
1948-11-27	D/Sgt	Kok Kee Teik	—	—	Shot dead by communist gunmen in a coffee shop in the village of Balik Pulau just outside George Town, Penang
1948-12-01	E/Sgt 75	J.A. Power	—	—	While Travelling with a platoon they were ambushed at 21st Muar/Langa road, Johore. He was killed in the ambush
1948-12-12	E/Sgt 350	G. Blenkinsop	—	—	Killed in an ambush at Kajung/Bangi road
1948-12-14	ASP G/466	B.F.S Cooper	—	—	Killed in an operation in Gemencheh, Tampin
1948-12-14	E/Sgt 26	R. Jones	—	—	died of wounds at Kuantan Hospital, Pahang
1948-12-14	Cadet	R. Hore	—	—	Killed in action at Jelebu, Negeri Sembilan
1948-12-14	PC	Hussein Bin Kulop Mat Sari	—	—	Killed in action at Batu Gajah, Perak
1949-01-09	SC	(unnamed)	—	—	A number of communist gunmen killed 2 Chinese women and 1 Special Constable(unnamed)
1949-01-11	E/Sgt	E.J. Aldrigde	—	—	Killed in action engaging communist gunmen at Malaya/Thailand border
1949-01-11	Cpl	Sidek	—	—	Killed in action engaging communist gunmen at Malaya/Thailand border
1949-01-23	PC	(unnamed)	—	—	Killed near Gurun, 14 miles North of Sungai Petani
1949-02-11	AP 164 (Lt/Col)	W.A. Gutsell	—	—	Ambushed in Kelross Estate Pantai, Negeri Sembilan
1949-02-11	SC 10909	P. Veerasamy	—	—	Ambushed in Kelross Estate Pantai, Negeri Sembilan
1949-02-11	SC 6068	Abdul Rahman Bin Awal	—	—	Ambushed in Kelross Estate Pantai, Negeri Sembilan
1949-02-11	SC 6160	Manap bin Mohd Jai	—	—	Ambushed in Kelross Estate Pantai, Negeri Sembilan
1949-02-18	D/PC	Tet Toong	—	—	Died from wounds received on the Feb 13th
1949-03-21	E/Sgt	G.E.M. McBoyle	—	—	Killed in an Operation near Ipoh, Perak
1949-03-25	E/Sgt 233	P. Humbles	—	—	Killed by a member of the notorious Kepayang gang throwing a grenade at Ipoh, Perak
1949-03-25	E/Sgt 451	W. Wells	—	—	Killed by a member of the notorious Kepayang gang throwing a grenade at Ipoh, Perak
1949-03-25	E/Sgt	W. Grant	—	—	Killed by a member of the notorious Kepayang gang throwing a grenade at Ipoh, Perak
1949-04-05	SC	Abdul Rahman Bin Shar	—	—	Shot dead by communist gunmen at Batu Caves Estate
1949-04-09	Cadet G/815	R.H Fookes	—	—	Cadet G/815 and 5 other Police Constables(unnamed) were killed and 3 other were wounded during an ambush by communist gunmen on 2 trucks near Padang Piol, Jerantut, Pahang
1949-04-09	PC	(unnamed)	—	—	Cadet G/815 and 5 other Police Constables(unnamed) were killed and 3 other were wounded during an ambush by communist gunmen on 2 trucks near Padang Piol, Jerantut, Pahang
1949-04-09	PC	(unnamed)	—	—	Cadet G/815 and 5 other Police Constables(unnamed) were killed and 3 other were wounded during an ambush by communist gunmen on 2 trucks near Padang Piol, Jerantut, Pahang
1949-04-09	PC	(unnamed)	—	—	Cadet G/815 and 5 other Police Constables(unnamed) were killed and 3 other were wounded during an ambush by communist gunmen on 2 trucks near Padang Piol, Jerantut, Pahang
1949-04-09	PC	(unnamed)	—	—	Cadet G/815 and 5 other Police Constables(unnamed) were killed and 3 other were wounded during an ambush by communist gunmen on 2 trucks near Padang Piol, Jerantut, Pahang
1949-04-09	PC	(unnamed)	—	—	Cadet G/815 and 5 other Police Constables(unnamed) were killed and 3 other were wounded during an ambush by communist gunmen on 2 trucks near Padang Piol, Jerantut, Pahang
1949-04-12	ASP (C) G/102	E.A Freeborough	—	—	Fatally wounded when leading a Patrol at Sri Medan, Batu Pahat, Johore
1949-04-21	P/Lt	W. Grant	—	—	Killed in a car accident at Batu Gajah, Perak
1949-04-22	E/Sgt	F.J.Caffrey	—	—	Killed in a car accident near Rasa Ulu Selangor, Selangor
1949-04-28	PC	(unnamed)	—	—	Ambushed at 33rd Kuala Lipis to Jerantut road, resulting PC(unnamed) being killed and two were wounded including one European sergeant
1949-04-30	Cadet	N.M.H. Murrin	—	—	Died from Cerebral Malaria
1949-05-10	SC	(unnamed)	—	—	A force of 15 communist gunmen attacked the United Malacca Rubber Estate. They broke through the barbed wire fence. They exchanged fire, killing an SC(unnamed).
1949-05-24	PC	(unnamed)	—	—	Killed during an engagement with communist gunmen at Kedmask area of Terengganu
1949-05-24	PC	(unnamed)	—	—	Killed during an engagement with communist gunmen at Kedmask area of Terengganu
1949-05-29	E/Sgt 53	N.H. Pullan	—	—	Killed in an operation at Batu Berendam, Pahang
1949-06-05	E/Sgt 238	C.W.H. Morgan	—	—	E/Sgt 238 and E/Sgt Danny along with two Special Constable went to investigate a shooting of a Chinese shopkeeper at Sungai Senerap Estate road, Segamat, Johore. When fifteen communist gunmen attacked them, E/Sgt 238 and one Special Constable(unnamed) were killed in action. Three communist gunmen were also killed during the shootout.
1949-06-05	SC	(unnamed)	—	—	E/Sgt 238 and E/Sgt Danny along with two Special Constable went to investigate a shooting of a Chinese shopkeeper at Sungai Senerap Estate road, Segamat, Johore. When fifteen communist gunmen attacked them, E/Sgt 238 and one Special Constable(unnamed) were killed in action. Three communist gunmen were also killed during the shootout.
1949-06-10	AP/Insp	L.W. Litkie	—	—	Killed in an operation
1949-07-12	Insp I/530	Kartar Singh	29	Jungle Squad	Inspector Kartar Singh, was killed in a firefight with the communists on 12 July 1949 on duty near Rawang. He and his jungle squad were carrying out their second police operation for the day. Where they were ambushed by communist forces. Ins Kartar Singh and his men fought until their ammunition had run out. They were then killed by multiple shots of Bren gunfire, their bodies were mutilated by the communists:Insp Singh's eyes were gouged out. The communists told his in-laws in Kluang, Johore, "Harimau sudah mati" (The Tiger is dead!) even before they were informed by their daughter, Balwant Kaur w/o Insp. Kartar Singh. The Straits Times 14 July 1949 carried the news on page 5. "Eight Policemen are killed in Bandit Ambush" i.e. 'half the strength of a jungle squad - were killed when they fought back against a force of communists that outnumbered them by about seven to one a few miles north of Rawang. Inspector Kartar Singh was leading his squad up a hill on the west of the Estate when the communists opened fire from very close range' 'Eight dead including the Inspector, a Sergeant, and six other policemen. Two policemen were wounded'.
1949-07-12	Sgt	(unnamed)	—	Jungle Squad	
1949-07-12	PC	(unnamed)	—	Jungle Squad	
1949-07-12	PC	(unnamed)	—	Jungle Squad	
1949-07-12	PC	(unnamed)	—	Jungle Squad	
1949-07-12	PC	(unnamed)	—	Jungle Squad	
1949-07-12	PC	(unnamed)	—	Jungle Squad	
1949-07-12	PC	(unnamed)	—	Jungle Squad	
1949-07-24	Cadet G/621	J.A. Embery	—	—	On a special police operation was shot dead by communist gunmen in Kemaman, Terengganu
1949-08-14	L/Sgt	Chew Meng Fatt	38	—	shot dead by an unknown gunmen at Aston Road, Bukit Mertajam.
1949-08-14	PC	(unnamed)	—	—	Ambushed in Metakab area
1949-08-14	PC	(unnamed)	—	—	Ambushed in Metakab area
1949-08-14	PC	(unnamed)	—	—	Ambushed in Metakab area
1949-08-14	PC	(unnamed)	—	—	Ambushed in Metakab area
1949-08-14	PC	(unnamed)	—	—	Ambushed in Metakab area
1949-08-14	PC	(unnamed)	—	—	Ambushed in Metakab area
1949-08-14	PC	(unnamed)	—	—	Ambushed in Metakab area
1949-08-14	SC	(unnamed)	—	—	40 communist gunmen armed with submachine guns attacked a Police Post near Kajang, Selangor, killing 3 Special Constable(unnamed) and a women(unnamed) before stealing rifles and ammunition
1949-08-14	SC	(unnamed)	—	—	40 communist gunmen armed with submachine guns attacked a Police Post near Kajang, Selangor, killing 3 Special Constable(unnamed) and a women(unnamed) before stealing rifles and ammunition
1949-08-14	SC	(unnamed)	—	—	40 communist gunmen armed with submachine guns attacked a Police Post near Kajang, Selangor, killing 3 Special Constable(unnamed) and a women(unnamed) before stealing rifles and ammunition
1949-09-10	PC	(unnamed)	—	—	Five days after the announcement of surrender terms. A total of 300 communist gunmen attacked the Police and Railway Station at Kuala Krau, Pahang. The communist gunmen cut telephone wires. During the three hour period of attack, eight communist gunmen were killed and four Police Constable(unnamed), two woman(unnamed) were killed.
1949-09-10	PC	(unnamed)	—	—	Five days after the announcement of surrender terms. A total of 300 communist gunmen attacked the Police and Railway Station at Kuala Krau, Pahang. The communist gunmen cut telephone wires. During the three hour period of attack, eight communist gunmen were killed and four Police Constable(unnamed), two woman(unnamed) were killed.
1949-09-10	PC	(unnamed)	—	—	Five days after the announcement of surrender terms. A total of 300 communist gunmen attacked the Police and Railway Station at Kuala Krau, Pahang. The communist gunmen cut telephone wires. During the three hour period of attack, eight communist gunmen were killed and four Police Constable(unnamed), two woman(unnamed) were killed.
1949-09-10	PC	(unnamed)	—	—	Five days after the announcement of surrender terms. A total of 300 communist gunmen attacked the Police and Railway Station at Kuala Krau, Pahang. The communist gunmen cut telephone wires. During the three hour period of attack, eight communist gunmen were killed and four Police Constable(unnamed), two woman(unnamed) were killed.
1949-09-12	AP/Insp	O. Lund	—	—	Killed in Batu Gajah
1949-09-21	PC	(unnamed)	—	—	Five PC (unnamed) were killed and six wounded in a communist ambush in Kroh area of Perak
1949-09-21	PC	(unnamed)	—	—	Five PC (unnamed) were killed and six wounded in a communist ambush in Kroh area of Perak
1949-09-21	PC	(unnamed)	—	—	Five PC (unnamed) were killed and six wounded in a communist ambush in Kroh area of Perak
1949-09-21	PC	(unnamed)	—	—	Five PC (unnamed) were killed and six wounded in a communist ambush in Kroh area of Perak
1949-09-21	PC	(unnamed)	—	—	Five PC (unnamed) were killed and six wounded in a communist ambush in Kroh area of Perak
1949-11-05	SC	(unnamed)	—	—	In the Segamat area of Johore, communist gunmen killed Mr F. Dutton-Huttun, a planter, 4 Chinese and 2 Special Constable(unnamed)
1949-11-05	SC	(unnamed)	—	—	In the Segamat area of Johore, communist gunmen killed Mr F. Dutton-Huttun, a planter, 4 Chinese and 2 Special Constable(unnamed)
1949-11-09	SC	(unnamed)	—	—	In an ambush by communist gunmen on the Selama/Taiping Road. Police engaged the communist gunmen, killing seven. Four communist were killed, two communist gunmen were women and two Special Constable (unnamed) were killed
1949-11-09	SC	(unnamed)	—	—	In an ambush by communist gunmen on the Selama/Taiping Road. Police engaged the communist gunmen, killing seven. Four communist were killed, two communist gunmen were women and two Special Constable (unnamed) were killed
1949-11-24	PC	Kahar Bin Sulong	—	—	Killed in an operation
1949-12-06	Sgt	Wahid	—	—	In a gun battle on an Estate near Bahau, Negeri Sembilan. When a force of Federation of Malaya Police Patrol, consisting of six Malay and four Chinese, engaged a much larger force of communist and fought to the last round. Four police were killed (unnamed) and six wounded. Their Malay commander Sgt Wahid died from thirteen bullet wounds
1949-12-06	PC	(unnamed)	—	—	In a gun battle on an Estate near Bahau, Negeri Sembilan. When a force of Federation of Malaya Police Patrol, consisting of six Malay and four Chinese, engaged a much larger force of communist and fought to the last round. Four police were killed (unnamed) and six wounded. Their Malay commander Sgt Wahid died from thirteen bullet wounds
1949-12-06	PC	(unnamed)	—	—	In a gun battle on an Estate near Bahau, Negeri Sembilan. When a force of Federation of Malaya Police Patrol, consisting of six Malay and four Chinese, engaged a much larger force of communist and fought to the last round. Four police were killed (unnamed) and six wounded. Their Malay commander Sgt Wahid died from thirteen bullet wounds
1949-12-06	PC	(unnamed)	—	—	In a gun battle on an Estate near Bahau, Negeri Sembilan. When a force of Federation of Malaya Police Patrol, consisting of six Malay and four Chinese, engaged a much larger force of communist and fought to the last round. Four police were killed (unnamed) and six wounded. Their Malay commander Sgt Wahid died from thirteen bullet wounds
1949-12-07	PC 11796	Ibrahim Bin Manap	—	—	Killed in action in Mersing area of Johore
1949-12-12	ASP (C)	D. Hope	—	Jungle Squad	At Jelebu Police Station, Negeri Sembilan, Police Sgt Jock Lovie joined the convoy of three Police trucks, containing a jungle Platoon consisting of E/Sgt D.J. Aylott, ASP (C) D.Hope, including 14 Malay policemen. Jock climbed into the front seat of the second truck. The trucks were not armoured and therefore, vulnerable if involved in an ambush. They left the Police Station at roughly mid morning and headed off in the direction of Seremban. When approaching a section of the winding road over the north–south mountain range. About halfway up the hill, the second truck, had some minor engine troubles and was overtaken by the third truck. The three trucks were almost at the top of the hill, where the banks were at least 10 foot high above the road. It was then that a fusillade of gunfire rained down on the three trucks. Killing and wounding many of the policemen. Jock immediately jumped from his truck and began firing towards the communist gunmen in their ambush position. A bullet managed to hit his carbine taking off the foresight. Nevertheless, he still continued to engage the enemy. At this stage he was wounded in the hand, unable to fight with his carbine, instead lobbed a grenade in the direction of the communist. The grenade hit the top of the bank and rolled back. As he went over the bank, he was hit by five bullets slowing him down. The communist gunmen now had control of the ambush position. When the firing stopped, the communist began throwing dead and wounded bodies onto the trucks. Before setting them ablaze, Jock could hear the communist gunmen calling out to each other to find the remainder of the survivors. Jock moved his position, beginning a hide and seek tactic. After about an hour of his movements, he came across another European Sergeant and a Malay. The three did not realise at the time, they were the only remaining survivors. the thought that their best option was to stay put and if cornered fight it out. However the communists left shortly afterwards. It was nearing twilight when the three decided to return to the road to find Army and Police personnel clearing up after the ambush. The three were very quickly taken to the hospital in Seremban. Fifteen police officers were killed in the action.
1949-12-12	E/Sgt	D.J. Aylott	—	Jungle Squad	
1949-12-12	PC 6402	Othman Bin Ahmad	—	Jungle Squad	
1949-12-12	PC 10841	Amin Bin Mohd Noor	—	Jungle Squad	
1949-12-12	PC 11219	Hassan Bin Mahmud	—	Jungle Squad	
1949-12-12	PC 11223	Awang Bin Muda	—	Jungle Squad	
1949-12-12	PC 10170	Abd Rashid Bin Jaafar	—	Jungle Squad	
1949-12-12	PC 3808	Hussein Bin Kasman	—	Jungle Squad	
1949-12-12	PC 9298	Ismail Bin Ibrahim	—	Jungle Squad	
1949-12-12	TPC 2077	Baharudin Bin Keling	—	Jungle Squad	
1949-12-12	TPC 12964	Abdullah Bin Yahya	—	Jungle Squad	
1949-12-12	TPC 12565	Abd Rahman Bin Kelom Mohd Jibin	—	Jungle Squad	
1949-12-12	TPC 12246	Zainal Abidin Bin Haji Ibrahim	—	Jungle Squad	
1949-12-12	TPC 12530	Idris Bin Kassim	—	Jungle Squad	
1949-12-12	TPC 2413	Mion Bin Nasir	—	Jungle Squad	
1949-12-13	TPC	Abd Kajid Bin Jamaludin	—	—	Died of a Motor vehicle accident at 31/2 Kota Tinggi/Lombong Road Johore
1949-12-14	Cadet	C.O Hara Murray M.C	—	—	Killed in an operation in Bertam, Kelantan
1949-12-15	PC 11469	Hassan Bin Aboo Bakar	—	—	Killed in action at Jelabu Road, Negeri Sembilan
1949-12-15	TPC 12684	Abd Majid Bin Jamaludin	—	—	Killed in action at Jelabu Road, Negeri Sembilan
1949-12-18	SC 22456	Rose Bin Yusof	—	—	Killed in action at Gunong Inas Rubber Estate, Perak
1949-12-20	PC 10096	Koming Bin Haji Mufti	—	—	Died by accident at Muar, Johore
1949-12-25	AP/Insp	J.O Neill	—	—	Died from a fractured scull, after an incident in Johore Bahru, Johore
1949-12-26	SC	(unnamed)	—	—	Killed in their camp near Kluang
1949-12-26	SC	(unnamed)	—	—	Killed in their camp near Kluang
1949-12-27	PC 8511	Kahar Bin Sulong	—	—	Killed in action at Yong Peng area, Johore
1949-12-27	EPC 3414	Abu Bakar Bin Kassim	—	—	Killed in action at Yong Peng area, Johore

== 1950s ==
Date	Rank/no	Name	Age	Division/unit	Circumstance
1950-01-06	Sgt 1541	Abu Bakar Bin Ali	—	Jungle Squad	Killed during a firefight with communist gunmen in jungles surrounding Batu Gajah, Perak
1950-01-07	AP 2605	Abdul Aziz Bin Dato' Abdullah	—	—	Killed in action engaging communist gunmen at 37th Kong Koi/Jelebu Road, Negeri Sembilan
1950-01-07	AP 2617	Mat Tahar Bin Maaker	—	—	Killed in action engaging communist gunmen at 37th Kong Koi/Jelebu Road, Negeri Sembilan
1950-01-07	AP 3445	Baharom Bin Mat Tahar	—	—	Killed in action engaging communist gunmen at 37th Kong Koi/Jelebu Road, Negeri Sembilan
1950-01-15	AP 418	Abdul Rashid Bin Tagor	—	—	Killed by communist gunmen at Bukit Selembua
1950-01-16	PC 12045	Haron Bin Idris	—	—	Died from wounds received on January 13 at Segamat, Johore
1950-01-17	EPC 3844	Sa'at Bin Mazuki	—	—	Killed in ambush at Kluang/Kahang road, Johore
1950-01-19	TPC 13246	Yaacob Bin Sulaiman	—	—	Killed in ambush at Ipoh, Perak
1950-01-20	SC 21792	Leong Ah Choy	—	—	Killed in action engaging communist gunmen at Sungai Siput, Perak
1950-01-22	E/Sgt	F.R. Young	—	Jungle Squad	Ambushed by Communist gunmen at Seberang Prai, Penang resulting in 8 officers including a British Sergeant, being killed, while six Malay officers were wounded.
1950-01-22	PC 12085	Hanasi Bin Ahmad	—	Jungle Squad	Ambushed by Communist gunmen at Seberang Prai, Penang resulting in 8 officers including a British Sergeant, being killed, while six Malay officers were wounded.
1950-01-22	PC 1917	Othman Bin Haji Omar	—	Jungle Squad	Ambushed by Communist gunmen at Seberang Prai, Penang resulting in 8 officers including a British Sergeant, being killed, while six Malay officers were wounded.
1950-01-22	PC 192	Abdul Rahman Bin Wahab	—	Jungle Squad	Ambushed by Communist gunmen at Seberang Prai, Penang resulting in 8 officers including a British Sergeant, being killed, while six Malay officers were wounded.
1950-01-22	PC 12051	Mohd Sohar Bin Abdul Ghani	—	Jungle Squad	Ambushed by Communist gunmen at Seberang Prai, Penang resulting in 8 officers including a British Sergeant, being killed, while six Malay officers were wounded.
1950-01-22	PC 12894	Johari Bin Mohd	—	Jungle Squad	Ambushed by Communist gunmen at Seberang Prai, Penang resulting in 8 officers including a British Sergeant, being killed, while six Malay officers were wounded.
1950-01-22	PC 2345	Mohd Shariff Bin Suleiman	—	Jungle Squad	Ambushed by Communist gunmen at Seberang Prai, Penang resulting in 8 officers including a British Sergeant, being killed, while six Malay officers were wounded.
1950-01-22	EPC 1626	Abdul Hamid Bin Nair	—	Jungle Squad	Ambushed by Communist gunmen at Seberang Prai, Penang resulting in 8 officers including a British Sergeant, being killed, while six Malay officers were wounded.
1950-01-22	SC 1638	Yeoh Chew Bhik	—	Jungle Squad	Ambushed by Communist gunmen at Seberang Prai, Penang resulting in 8 officers including a British Sergeant, being killed, while six Malay officers were wounded.
1950-01-23	PC 9081	Ismail Bin Talib	—	—	Died from wounds received in an ambush on the previous day
1950-01-26	PC	Ismail Bin Talib	—	—	Killed in an ambush at Sungai Siput, Perak
1950-01-27	SC/Cpl 8704	Ja'afar Bin Abu Talib	—	—	Ambushed in Sungai Papan Estate Kota Tinggi area, Johore
1950-01-27	SC 30622	Embi Bin Mohd Shah	—	—	Ambushed in Sungai Papan Estate Kota Tinggi area, Johore
1950-01-27	SC 6811	Yusof Bin Abdullah	—	—	Ambushed in Sungai Papan Estate Kota Tinggi area, Johore
1950-01-27	SC 7627	Sutan Bin Haji Arshad	—	—	Ambushed in Sungai Papan Estate Kota Tinggi area, Johore
1950-01-27	SC 30570	Abdullah Bin Jaafar	—	—	Ambushed in Sungai Papan Estate Kota Tinggi area, Johore
1950-01-27	SC 17090	Ahmad Bin Awang	—	—	Ambushed in Sungai Papan Estate Kota Tinggi area, Johore
1950-01-27	SC 8708	Awang Bin Mahmood	—	—	Ambushed in Sungai Papan Estate Kota Tinggi area, Johore
1950-01-27	SC 8705	Atan Bin Ahmat	—	—	Ambushed in Sungai Papan Estate Kota Tinggi area, Johore
1950-01-30	AP 61	Tai Jon	—	—	Ambushed by communist gunmen at Pondok Batang, Jasin, Malacca while escorting a weapons convoy to Asahan.
1950-01-31	SC 19816	Awang Bin Abdul Ghani	—	—	Ambushed in Rengan Water pumping station in Johore
1950-01-31	SC 20299	Khalid Bin Rahman	—	—	Ambushed in Rengan Water pumping station in Johore
1950-02-01	SC 8928	Ahmad Bin Haji Ali	—	—	Died from wounds received on Rengan Water pumping station
1950-02-03	SM 1797	Mohd Noor Bin Asap	—	—	Killed in an operation
1950-02-10	E/Sgt 58	H.F. Cowan	—	—	Killed in ambush at 20th Galong road, Sungai Siput, Perak
1950-02-10	EPC 1740	Balwant Singh Kartan Singh	—	—	Killed in ambush at 20th Galong road, Sungai Siput, Perak
1950-02-14	SC 10493	Zakaria Bin Haji Ahmad	—	—	Killed in ambush at Kota Tinggi Power Station
1950-02-15	PC 1168	Talib Bin Kidan	—	—	Killed in ambush at Nankuang Pahang
1950-02-15	PC 11542	Zahiri Bin Yob	—	—	Killed in ambush at Nankuang Pahang
1950-02-17	AP/Insp	I.L.F. Campbell	—	—	Killed at North of Bentong
1950-02-19	D/PC	(unnamed)	—	—	Following the shooting of a Police Chinese Detective(unnamed). The whole of Bukit Mertajam was placed under strict curfew between hours 6pm to 6am
1950-02-23	Sgt 3493	Jamil Bin Mohd Shah	28	Bukit Kepong	The incident started at about 4:15 am before dawn with 200 Communist gunmen attacking, led by Muhammad Indera, a Malay Communist launching a guerilla assault on the Bukit Kepong police station. Despite the odds, the policemen led by Sgt 3493, refused to surrender, although numerous calls by the communists for them to lay down arms were made. In the final hours of the fierce battle, the Communists set fire to the officer's barracks and station. Only about five hours after the first shot was fired did the communists manage to break their defences and set the place ablaze. They then retreated into the jungle, leaving a trail of destruction and bloodshed. Fourteen police officers, five auxiliary police and their families were killed in the incident while four officers such as MPC 37, PC 7645, PC 10533, and EPC 3472 wounded in the battle. Few years after the incident, the Malay Communist leader who was responsible for the incident was arrested by Batu Pahat Police Special Branch detectives and hanged to death at Perak.
1950-02-23	Cpl 7068	Mohd Yassin Bin Haji Abdul Wahab	—	Bukit Kepong	
1950-02-23	L/Cpl 7168	Jidin Bin Omar	—	Bukit Kepong	
1950-02-23	PC 3933	Hamzah Bin Ahmad	—	Bukit Kepong	
1950-02-23	PC 5674	Abu Bin Mohd Ali	—	Bukit Kepong	
1950-02-23	PC 7493	Mohamad @ Ahmad Bin Jaafar	—	Bukit Kepong	
1950-02-23	PC 7862	Abdul Kadir Bin Jusoh	—	Bukit Kepong	
1950-02-23	PC 8600	Jaafar Bin Hassan	—	Bukit Kepong	
1950-02-23	PC 9136	Hassan Bin Othman	—	Bukit Kepong	
1950-02-23	EPC 3475	Mohd Tap Bin Lazim	—	Bukit Kepong	
1950-02-23	EPC 3795	Jaafar Bin Arshad	—	Bukit Kepong	
1950-02-23	AP 1912	Mahmood Bin Saat	—	Bukit Kepong	
1950-02-23	AP 1925	Ali Akob Bin Othman	—	Bukit Kepong	
1950-02-23	AP 2098	Redzuan Bin Alias	—	Bukit Kepong	
1950-02-23	AP 2127	Othman Bin Yahya	—	Bukit Kepong	
1950-02-23	AP 2130	Samad Bin Yatim	—	Bukit Kepong	
1950-02-23	MPC 60	Ibrahim Bin Adam	—	Marine	
1950-02-23	MPC 68	Awang Bin Ali	—	Marine	
1950-02-23	MPC 181	Basiron Bin Adam	—	Marine	
1950-02-24	D/Cpl 331	David Chessex	—	—	Killed in an ambush at Gopeng, Perak
1950-03-02	AP 4220	B. Gates	—	—	killed in ambush in Cameron Highlands, Pahang
1950-03-02	SC 14493	Wan Kamarudin Bin Yeop Manap	—	—	killed in ambush in Cameron Highlands, Pahang
1950-03-03	E/Sgt 22	E.P. Hackett	—	—	Killed in action in Ban Lee Estate, Bentong, Pahang
1950-03-04	SC 7246	Mohd Sujod Bin Serdai	—	—	Ambushed by communist gunmen at Eldred Estate in Bekok, Segamat, Johore
1950-03-04	SC 8959	Othman Bin Talib	—	—	Ambushed by communist gunmen at Eldred Estate in Bekok, Segamat, Johore
1950-03-05	PC	(unnamed)	—	—	A train was derailed near Mentakab, Pahang. A Police Constable(unnamed) was killed including several passengers were wounded when communist gunmen open fire
1950-03-06	SC 11460	Ya'acob Bin Abdul Khan	—	—	Ambushed in Sungai Dingin Estate Kulim, Kedah
1950-03-06	SC 11517	Awang Bin Mat Saman	—	—	Ambushed in Sungai Dingin Estate Kulim, Kedah
1950-03-06	SC 31105	Ariffin Bin Awang	—	—	Ambushed in Sungai Dingin Estate Kulim, Kedah
1950-03-07	SC 31726	Awal Khan s/o Sab Khan	—	—	At 8 miles from Kuala Lumpur, at an open-air Cinema in the village of Kepong, Selangor. Cham Sam Yin, the leader of a band of communist gunmen suddenly opened fire on the audience watching a Chinese movie and causing havoc. Killing SC 31726 and other 17 people, including children and wounding many others.
1950-03-08	SC 36881	Hashim Bin Abdul Mahid	—	—	Died from wounds received 4 days before
1950-03-13	D/PC 10493	Gooi Ban Teik	—	—	Killed in an ambush at 39th Bruas/Sitiawan Road, Perak
1950-03-13	TPC 12851	Mohd Isa Bin Sharif	—	—	Killed in an ambush at 39th Bruas/Sitiawan Road, Perak
1950-03-13	EPC 1723	Din Bin Endut	—	—	Killed in an ambush at 39th Bruas/Sitiawan Road, Perak
1950-03-21	E/Sgt 197	K.W. Davies	—	—	Ambush on road in Banenoch Estate Sungai Patani, Kedah
1950-03-21	SC 30922	Seenevasadak	—	—	Killed in action at Banenoch Estate, Kedah
1950-03-22	PC 12416	Sharkawi Bin Haji Mohd Daud	—	—	Died from wounds received in an ambush on the previous day on the Bandenoch Estate Pahang
1950-03-25	PC 545	Latif Bin Ariffin	—	—	Killed in an Operations near Ipoh, Perak
1950-03-27	EPC 2568	Dolah Bin Hj Taib	—	—	Killed in an Operation
1950-03-28	SC 12288	Keechot Osman Bin Kassim	—	—	Killed in action on Puchong Estate, Johore
1950-03-28	SC 27374	Meeron Bin Tahir	—	—	Killed in action on Puchong Estate, Johore
1950-03-29	PC 13194	Alias Bin Mahat	—	—	Died from wounds received in an ambush on the previous day at Bukit Mertajam, Penang
1950-03-30	SC 21470	Ujang Bin Ahmad	—	—	Killed in action at between Glendak Estate & Serting Negeri Sembilan
1950-03-30	SC 34329	Maizam Bin Mohamed	—	—	Killed in action at between Glendak Estate & Serting Negeri Sembilan
1950-04-01	PC 10634	Ahmad Bin Mohd Yusof	—	—	Killed in action at Ulu Serting Kuala Pilah, Negeri Sembilan
1950-04-01	SC 21612	Mamar Bin Bachik	—	—	Killed in action at Batu Sables Estate Rembua, Negeri Sembilan
1950-04-04	PC 8134	Arshad Bin Siraj	—	—	Killed in an ambush at 11th Yong Peng/Paloh Road, Johore
1950-04-10	AP 1041	Liew Why Tone	—	—	Killed in an operation
1950-04-15	PC 6888	Khalid Bin Rahman	—	—	Died from wounds received in ambush at Metakab, Pahang
1950-04-16	AP/Insp	Foo Eng Lim	—	—	Killed in action at Sungai Kelemah Estate, Negeri Sembilan
1950-04-16	SC 5525	Mohamed Yassin Bin Baba	—	—	Killed in action at Sungai Kelemah Estate, Negeri Sembilan
1950-04-28	SC 2490	Tan Bin Abdullah	—	—	killed in an ambush by communists at Harbourough Estate, Sungai Perak
1950-04-28	SC 14349	Mat Bin Kassim	—	—	killed in an ambush by communists at Harbourough Estate, Sungai Perak
1950-04-28	SC 14371	Saleh Bin Kulop Mat Ali	—	—	killed in an ambush by communists at Harbourough Estate, Sungai Perak
1950-04-28	SC 20991	Hamid Bin Drasin	—	—	killed in an ambush by communists at Harbourough Estate, Sungai Perak
1950-04-28	SC 20999	Din Bin Abdul Hamid	—	—	killed in an ambush by communists at Harbourough Estate, Sungai Perak
1950-04-28	SC 27855	Aziz Bin Uda	—	—	killed in an ambush by communists at Harbourough Estate, Sungai Perak
1950-04-28	SC 27906	Adnan Bin Yahaya	—	—	killed in an ambush by communists at Harbourough Estate, Sungai Perak
1950-04-28	AP 3852	Laili Bin Mat Hassan	—	—	killed in an ambush by communists at Harbourough Estate, Sungai Perak
1950-05-05	Cadet G/754	K.F Dawson	—	—	Killed in an operation while leading a squad in a silent approach on a communist camp in Kulim, Kedah
1950-05-09	E/Sgt 365	P.J. Murphy	—	—	drowned in Pasir Kemudi, Kuantan
1950-05-10	PC 2986	Saad Bin Desa	—	—	Killed in an ambush in Kuala Nerang, Pahang
1950-05-13	Cadet G/1084	P.R. J Evans	—	—	Killed in action in Bentong Kroh Road, Kedah also 6 Police(unnamed) were killed and 4 others wounded
1950-05-13	PC	(unnamed)	—	—	Killed in action in Bentong Kroh Road, Kedah also 6 Police(unnamed) were killed and 4 others wounded
1950-05-13	PC	(unnamed)	—	—	Killed in action in Bentong Kroh Road, Kedah also 6 Police(unnamed) were killed and 4 others wounded
1950-05-13	PC	(unnamed)	—	—	Killed in action in Bentong Kroh Road, Kedah also 6 Police(unnamed) were killed and 4 others wounded
1950-05-13	PC	(unnamed)	—	—	Killed in action in Bentong Kroh Road, Kedah also 6 Police(unnamed) were killed and 4 others wounded
1950-05-13	PC	(unnamed)	—	—	Killed in action in Bentong Kroh Road, Kedah also 6 Police(unnamed) were killed and 4 others wounded
1950-05-13	PC	(unnamed)	—	—	Killed in action in Bentong Kroh Road, Kedah also 6 Police(unnamed) were killed and 4 others wounded
1950-05-14	PC 132	Abdullah Bin Ishak	—	—	Killed in an ambush Padang Tasek, Pahang
1950-05-14	PC 212	Aliram s/o Din Seng	—	—	Killed in an ambush Padang Tasek, Pahang
1950-05-14	PC 803	Shariff Bin Yahaya	—	—	Killed in an ambush Padang Tasek, Pahang
1950-05-14	PC 3497	Amin Bin Mat	—	—	Killed in action at Batu Bor, Pahang
1950-05-15	SC 20996	Othman Bin Mat Arof	—	—	Killed in an ambush at Suloh Estate, Perak
1950-05-15	SC 27099	Mohd Said Bin Yacob	—	—	Killed in an ambush at Suloh Estate, Perak
1950-05-15	PC 811	Hassan Bin Su	—	—	Killed in an Operation
1950-05-16	AP 1611	Vaithilingam s/o Chelliah	—	—	Killed in an Operation
1950-05-18	SC 20946	Mohamed Bin Mat Noor	—	—	Killed in action at 27th Tapah Road, Perak
1950-05-19	PC 807	Ismail Bin Ibrahim	—	—	Died from wounds received in an ambush on 13 May at Padang Tesek, Kedah
1950-05-20	SC 24448	Then Choon	—	—	Killed in action at Ayer Kuning, South Negeri Sembilan
1950-05-23	SC 12271	Mat Eisa Bin Osman	—	—	Killed in an ambush between the Ayah Hitam Estate&Ipoh Tin Mine
1950-05-23	SC 12284	Abdul Khader Bin Ghani	—	—	Killed in an ambush between the Ayah Hitam Estate&Ipoh Tin Mine
1950-05-26	SC 23870	Trebes Bin Elias	—	—	Killed in action at Gunong Rapat, Perak
1950-05-26	SC 38846	Hamdan Bin Elias	—	—	Killed in action at Gunong Rapat, Perak
1950-05-26	PC	Ismail Bin Ibrahim	—	—	Killed in action at Gunong Rapat, Perak
1950-05-26	TPC 7146	Hamid Bin Jaafar	—	—	Killed in action at Gunong Rapat, Perak
1950-05-28	SC 7400	Ahmed Bin Ngah Mohamed	—	—	Killed in an operation
1950-05-31	D/PC 403	Wong Kon Ying	—	—	Died from wounds received on the previous day at Batu Gajah, Perak
1950-06-01	E/Sgt 211	M. Johnson	—	—	Ambushed in Gemas to Tampin road
1950-06-01	PC 11407	Ahmad Bin Wahab	—	—	Ambushed in Gemas to Tampin road
1950-06-01	EPC 2337	Hilong Bin Sahat	—	—	Ambushed in Gemas to Tampin road
1950-06-03	PC 6619	Fais Bux	—	—	Killed in an ambush in Grik, Perak
1950-06-04	SC/Sgt 3415	Lam Chan Poh	—	—	Killed in an ambush at the 74th Lengong/Grik Road, Perak
1950-06-04	SC 13182	Chan Hong	—	—	Killed in an ambush at the 74th Lengong/Grik Road, Perak
1950-06-12	AP 10343	Lee Kai	—	—	Killed in an operation
1950-06-12	AP 6784	Yoong Fook	—	—	Killed in an operation
1950-06-12	AP 18546	Kassim Bin Abdullah	—	—	Killed in an operation
1950-06-12	AP 8667	Sulaiman Bin Hassan	—	—	Killed in an operation
1950-06-17	AP	Vaithilinhams s/o Chelliah	—	—	Killed in action at Kerak/Manchia Road, Pahang
1950-06-17	SC 15618	Sahat Bin Hassan	—	—	Killed in action at Kerak/Manchia Road, Pahang
1950-06-17	SC 19396	Shahroni Bin Sumat	—	—	Killed in action at Kerak/Manchia Road, Pahang
1950-06-18	SC 23776	Abdullah Bin Mohamad Yassin	—	—	Killed in action at Kota Tinggi, Johore
1950-06-19	D/Cpl 502	Abdul Razak Bin Abu Bakar	—	—	Died from wounds received at Bukit Selembua, Kedah
1950-06-19	PC 11450	Ahmad Bin Alang Hussain	—	—	Died from wounds received at Bukit Selembua, Kedah
1950-06-19	EPC 3372	Mahmood Bin Rashid	—	—	Died from wounds received at Bukit Selembua, Kedah
1950-06-23	PC 9397	Jaffar Bin Abdullah	—	—	Died in an ambush at Pasir, Hutan Perak
1950-06-23	PC 695	Hassan Bin Abdul Akas	—	—	Died in an ambush at Pasir, Hutan Perak
1950-06-23	EPC 2489	Manap Bin Haji Said	—	—	Died in an ambush at Pasir, Hutan Perak
1950-06-25	SC	Hamden Bin Elias	—	—	Killed in action at Amaran Estate, Johore
1950-06-25	SC	Trebes Bin Elias	—	—	Killed in action at Amaran Estate, Johore
1950-06-25	SC 15786	Yacob Bin Mohd Ariff	—	—	Killed in action At 54th Triang/Kluang Railway track
1950-06-25	SC 19542	Muhassin Bin Yaman	—	—	Killed in action At 54th Triang/Kluang Railway track
1950-06-25	SC	Abdul Rahim Bin Abdul Rahman	—	—	Killed in action At 54th Triang/Kluang Railway track
1950-06-25	SC	Zaiton Bin Haji Ihsan	—	—	Killed in action At 54th Triang/Kluang Railway track
1950-06-25	SC	Mansor Bin Kardan	—	—	Killed in action At 54th Triang/Kluang Railway track
1950-06-25	L/Cpl 2738	Abdul Rahman Bin Laudin	—	—	Died from wounds received at an ambush at Kajang, Selangor
1950-06-26	Cpl 6924	Haji Siraji Bin Haji Mansor	—	—	Killed in action at Kemban, Johore
1950-06-27	Cpl 12069	Mohd Yunos Bin Buyong	—	—	Died from wounds received at an ambush on 26 June At 54th Triang/Matakab Road, Pahang
1950-06-27	SC 31923	Ibrahim Bin Ahmad	—	—	Killed in action at Denkil Road, Selangor
1950-07-01	TPC 3348	Kassim Bin Mohd	—	—	Killed in an ambush at 15th Pontian Road, Johore
1950-07-01	TPC 3234	Othman Bin Mohd Arif	—	—	Killed in an ambush at 15th Pontian Road, Johore
1950-07-01	D/PC 42	Chong Keow	—	—	Killed in action in an ambush at Ruab, Pahang
1950-07-02	PC 3073	Mat Isa Bin Mat	—	—	Killed in action At Terap area of Kedah
1950-07-05	D/PC 409	Chong Kong Wah	—	—	Died from wounds Received at Terap area of Kedah
1950-07-07	TPC 3296	Yusof Bin Abdul Rahman	—	—	Died from wounds received on 1 July
1950-07-07	AP/Insp	J.L. Boden	—	—	Killed in Sembrong Estate in Johore
1950-07-07	SC	(unnamed)	—	—	Killed in Sembrong Estate in Johore
1950-07-08	AP	Awang Kechik Bin Dosah	—	—	Killed in an operation
1950-07-09	P/Lt	J.W. Chown	—	—	Killed in an operation
1950-07-09	EPC	Ali Bin Haji Hamid	—	—	Killed in an operation
1950-07-13	EPC 3249	Sahid Bin Haji Ahmad Taib	—	—	Killed by accident at Cameron Highlands
1950-07-20	E/Sgt 496	L. Wernham	—	—	murdered in Taiping, Perak
1950-07-20	E/Sgt 440	K.J. Webb	—	—	murdered in Taiping, Perak
1950-07-20	D/Cpl 316	Mohd Ariff	—	—	murdered in Taiping, Perak
1950-07-26	SC 24938	Abdul Rahim Bin Abdul Rahman	—	—	Died from wounds received in an engagement with communist forces at Ayer Itan, Perak
1950-07-28	SC/Cpl 4335	Zaiton Bin Hj Ihsan	—	—	Killed in an ambush at Banting Kuala Langit District Selangor
1950-07-28	SC 16926	Mansor Bin Kardan	—	—	Killed in an ambush at Banting Kuala Langit District Selangor
1950-08-03	SC 38560	Hussain Bin Mat Lela	—	—	Died from wounds received during an engagement with communist at Pahang
1950-08-09	ASP	D.A Craig	—	—	Kiiled in an operation when their police jeep was ambushed by communist gunmen at Tapah, Perak
1950-08-09	Sgt 2029	Ahmad Bin Arshad	—	—	Kiiled in an operation when their police jeep was ambushed by communist gunmen at Tapah, Perak
1950-08-09	L/Cpl 609	Ariffin Bin Mat Nusu	—	—	Kiiled in an operation when their police jeep was ambushed by communist gunmen at Tapah, Perak
1950-08-09	SC 27986	Mohd Noor Bin Hj Talib	—	—	Kiiled in an operation when their police jeep was ambushed by communist gunmen at Tapah, Perak
1950-08-10	Cadet G/688	D.A Craig	—	—	Killed in action at Tapah, Perak
1950-08-10	SC 3413	Ismail Bin Chat	—	—	Killed in action at Grik, Perak
1950-08-13	SC 5000	Mat Dais Bin Awang	—	—	Ambush in Kendeng Estate, Johore
1950-08-17	SC	Abdullah Bin Sangkut	—	—	Killed in action at Henda Estate, Sungai Perak
1950-08-18	SC 11524	Abu Bakar Bin Salleh	—	—	Died from wounds received at Terap area of Kedah
1950-08-20	PC 798	Ahmad Bin Puteh	—	—	Killed in action at Kulim Kedah
1950-08-20	PC	Hassan Bin Su	—	—	Killed in action at Kulim Kedah
1950-08-23	PC 40	Omar Bin Ahmad	—	—	Died from wounds received on 20 August
1950-08-25	PC 9364	Muhammad Bin Abd Jalil	—	Federation of Malaya Police	Killed when the British Royal Air Force (RAF) Douglas DC 3 Dakota KN630 aircraft crashed in the steep forested foothills in the Gua Musang district en route from the airbase in Changi, Singapore to Kota Bharu, Kelantan. Alongside him, twelve crew including three Dakota crew, four air dispatchers, and other passengers also perished in the incident. A platoon of British troops went to the rescue and they reached the crash site, but due to the communist threat, they hastily buried the dead in makeshift graves. Around 58 years later, on 3 October 2008, the British and Malaysian governments sent the biggest recovery operation project so far to visit the wreckage site and recover the remains.
1950-08-25	SC 27824	Abdullah Bin Baharom	—	—	
1950-08-31	P/Lt 276	D.J. Simmons	—	—	killed while on anti-Communist duties in Batu Gajah, Perak
1950-09-02	E/Sgt	R.J.E. Harrison	—	—	Accidentally shot by a military patrol at Kajang, Selangor
1950-09-04	PC 1204	Hussain Bin Din	—	—	Died from wounds received in an ambush at Batu Gajah, Perak
1950-09-05	SM 1793	Mohd Noor Bin Asap	—	—	Killed in action in Bentong, Pahang
1950-09-05	PC 11865	Salleh Bin Sirona	—	—	Killed in action in Bentong, Pahang
1950-09-07	PC 1117	Ali Bin Hj Hamid	—	—	Killed in an ambush on Mersing/Endau Road, Johore
1950-09-09	SC/Cpl 5726	Ahmad Bin Sangkut	—	—	Killed in action at Bentong Ruab Road, Pahang
1950-09-11	PC 840	Ahmad Bin Esa	—	—	Killed in action At Kluang, Johore
1950-09-11	PC 3850	Abdul Rahman Bin Omar	—	—	Killed in action At Kluang, Johore
1950-09-16	EPC 288	Chung Chik Yau	—	—	Killed in Georgetown area, Penang
1950-09-17	PC 11282	Mohd Noor Bin Abdullah	—	—	Killed in action engaging communist
1950-09-17	SC 2870	Hussein Bin Awang	—	—	Killed in action engaging communist
1950-09-17	SC 2927	Saad Bin Mat	—	—	Killed in action engaging communist
1950-09-23	PC 6845	Mustaffa Bin Ahmad	—	—	Killed in an ambush at Kulai, Johore
1950-09-26	Cpl 6207	Wan Hussin Bin Wan Yusoff	—	—	Killed when he was on a raft travelling by river from Batu to Keli Kelantan
1950-09-28	PC 2866	Hamid Bin Sudin	—	—	Killed in an ambush at 25th Malacca/Seletar Road, Malacca
1950-09-30	SC 8956	Naem Bin Sitam	—	—	Ambushed by communist gunmen at Eldred Estate in Bekok, Segamat, Johore.
1950-09-30	SC 17392	Mohamed Yusof Bin Sulaiman	—	—	Ambushed by communist gunmen at Eldred Estate in Bekok, Segamat, Johore.
1950-10-04	PC 8656	Dalip Singh	—	—	Killed at the Estate, Negeri Sembilan
1950-10-09	SC 25922	Ahmad Bin Ibrahim	—	—	Killed in Niyor Rubber Estate in Kluang area of Johore
1950-10-09	SC 29515	Kadir Bin Hj Yunus	—	—	Killed in Niyor Rubber Estate in Kluang area of Johore
1950-10-09	SC	Ahmid Bin Sangkut	—	—	Killed in Niyor Rubber Estate in Kluang area of Johore
1950-10-12	D/Cpl 649	Chan Ah Thiam	—	—	Died from gun wounds received at Cintra Street Pahang
1950-10-15	SC	Barharudin Bin Bima	—	—	Killed in action at Papanarea of Batu Gaja, Perak
1950-10-16	SC 2647	Suleiman Bin Mat	—	—	Ambushed by communist gunmen at oh Pak Long, Air Kuning, Negeri Sembilan.
1950-10-16	SC 2692	Salleh Bin Abdul Ghani	—	—	Ambushed by communist gunmen at oh Pak Long, Air Kuning, Negeri Sembilan.
1950-10-16	SC 14773	Mohamed Zain Bin Yop Mat	—	—	Ambushed by communist gunmen at oh Pak Long, Air Kuning, Negeri Sembilan.
1950-10-16	SC 14922	Baharudin Bin Bima	—	—	Ambushed by communist gunmen at oh Pak Long, Air Kuning, Negeri Sembilan.
1950-10-16	SC 20606	Yaacob Bin Hj Mat Asif	—	—	Ambushed by communist gunmen at oh Pak Long, Air Kuning, Negeri Sembilan.
1950-10-16	SC 27867	Yop Bin Kulop Ada	—	—	Ambushed by communist gunmen at oh Pak Long, Air Kuning, Negeri Sembilan.
1950-10-17	Cpl 7163	Mohd Yatim Bin Abdullah	—	—	Ambushed by communist gunmen at Chan Wing Estate in Bekok, Segamat, Johore. Communist gunmen placed a minefield in areas near the gap. Once the police vehicle of the Labis Police Station approached the route, the vehicle exploded before being overturned, then the gunmen fired at them and threw grenades from the top of the hill, killing eight officers and wounding one.
1950-10-17	PC 11765	Nordin Bin Kadir	—	—	Ambushed by communist gunmen at Chan Wing Estate in Bekok, Segamat, Johore. Communist gunmen placed a minefield in areas near the gap. Once the police vehicle of the Labis Police Station approached the route, the vehicle exploded before being overturned, then the gunmen fired at them and threw grenades from the top of the hill, killing eight officers and wounding one.
1950-10-17	PC 11768	Mohd Noor Bin Lajis	—	—	Ambushed by communist gunmen at Chan Wing Estate in Bekok, Segamat, Johore. Communist gunmen placed a minefield in areas near the gap. Once the police vehicle of the Labis Police Station approached the route, the vehicle exploded before being overturned, then the gunmen fired at them and threw grenades from the top of the hill, killing eight officers and wounding one.
1950-10-17	PC 11898	Annuar Bin Buyong	—	—	Ambushed by communist gunmen at Chan Wing Estate in Bekok, Segamat, Johore. Communist gunmen placed a minefield in areas near the gap. Once the police vehicle of the Labis Police Station approached the route, the vehicle exploded before being overturned, then the gunmen fired at them and threw grenades from the top of the hill, killing eight officers and wounding one.
1950-10-17	PC 13049	Ismail Bin Abas	—	—	Ambushed by communist gunmen at Chan Wing Estate in Bekok, Segamat, Johore. Communist gunmen placed a minefield in areas near the gap. Once the police vehicle of the Labis Police Station approached the route, the vehicle exploded before being overturned, then the gunmen fired at them and threw grenades from the top of the hill, killing eight officers and wounding one.
1950-10-17	PC 13168	Mohd Shah Bin Haji Abdullah	—	—	Ambushed by communist gunmen at Chan Wing Estate in Bekok, Segamat, Johore. Communist gunmen placed a minefield in areas near the gap. Once the police vehicle of the Labis Police Station approached the route, the vehicle exploded before being overturned, then the gunmen fired at them and threw grenades from the top of the hill, killing eight officers and wounding one.
1950-10-17	EPC 2596	Mohd Bin Hussain	—	—	Ambushed by communist gunmen at Chan Wing Estate in Bekok, Segamat, Johore. Communist gunmen placed a minefield in areas near the gap. Once the police vehicle of the Labis Police Station approached the route, the vehicle exploded before being overturned, then the gunmen fired at them and threw grenades from the top of the hill, killing eight officers and wounding one.
1950-10-17	EPC 3426	Mohd Bin Salleh	—	—	Ambushed by communist gunmen at Chan Wing Estate in Bekok, Segamat, Johore. Communist gunmen placed a minefield in areas near the gap. Once the police vehicle of the Labis Police Station approached the route, the vehicle exploded before being overturned, then the gunmen fired at them and threw grenades from the top of the hill, killing eight officers and wounding one.
1950-10-18	EPC 1383	Itam Bin Hj Abdullah	—	—	Died from wounds received the previous day
1950-10-20	PC 9055	Abdul Aziz Bin Hussain	—	—	Killed in an ambush in Padang Kedah
1950-10-20	PC 10110	Yusoff Bin Mat	—	—	Killed in an ambush in Padang Kedah
1950-10-20	PC 10099	Kesmari Bin Dimin	—	—	Killed in an ambush in Padang Kedah
1950-10-20	PC 10754	Shaari Bin Salleh	—	—	Killed in an ambush in Padang Kedah
1950-10-20	SC 35565	Mohd Noor Bin Abdullah	—	—	Killed in an ambush in Padang Kedah
1950-10-23	PC	Mohd Bin Ahmad	—	—	Killed in an operation
1950-10-26	Cpl	Wan Hussin Bin Wan Yusoff	—	—	Killed in action at 16th Changloon/Bintok Road, Jitra Kedah
1950-10-26	PC 10551	Mohd Desa Bin Awang	—	—	Killed in action at 16th Changloon/Bintok Road, Jitra Kedah
1950-10-26	SC 24512	Lebar Bin Tahir	—	—	Died from wounds during an engagement with communist gunmen on Jeran Padang Estate Bahua, Negeri Sembilan
1950-10-29	PC 4370	Arshad Bin Abdul Hamid	—	—	Killed in action engaging communist gunmen at Balik Pulau, Penang
1950-10-31	SC 4095	Ibrahim Bin Endot	—	—	Killed in ambush on Johore Labis Estate, Johore
1950-10-31	SC	Naem Bin Sitam	—	—	Killed in ambush on Johore Labis Estate, Johore
1950-10-31	SC	Mohamed Yusof Bin Sulaiman	—	—	Killed in ambush on Johore Labis Estate, Johore
1950-11-01	P/Lt 342	P.S. Turner	—	—	Died from gunshot wounds at Kluang, Johore
1950-11-02	SC/Cpl 5240	Biland Khan	—	—	Killed during at engagement with a number of communist gunmen on Sungai Kelamah Estate, Gemas Negeri Sembilan
1950-11-03	SC/Sgt 1021	Khalid Bin Hassim	—	—	Ambushed by communist gunmen at Sungai Kelamah Estates, Gemas Negeri Sembilan
1950-11-03	SC 16080	Sabtu Bin Adam	—	—	Ambushed by communist gunmen at Sungai Kelamah Estates, Gemas Negeri Sembilan
1950-11-03	SC 24399	Matahah Bin Yassin	—	—	Ambushed by communist gunmen at Sungai Kelamah Estates, Gemas Negeri Sembilan
1950-11-04	PC	Dlip Singh	—	—	Killed in action engaging communist gunmen at Batu Pahat, Johore
1950-11-06	PC	Biland Khan	—	—	Killed in an operation
1950-11-06	PC	Matahah Bin Yassin	—	—	Killed in an operation
1950-11-06	PC	Sabtu Bin Adam	—	—	Killed in an operation
1950-11-14	P/Lt 550	G.W.B. Cain	—	—	Killed in an operation in Muar, Johore
1950-11-14	SC/Cpl 17258	Khamis Bin Yusof	—	—	Killed in an operation in Muar, Johore
1950-11-17	PC	Mohd Shah Bin Hj Abdullah	—	—	Killed in an operation
1950-11-17	PC	Annuar Bin Buyong	—	—	Killed in an operation
1950-11-17	PC	Abdul Aziz Bin Hussain	—	—	Killed in ambush
1950-11-17	PC	Yussof Bin Mat	—	—	Killed in ambush
1950-11-17	PC	Kesmari Bin Dimin	—	—	Killed in ambush
1950-11-17	PC	Shaari Bin Salleh	—	—	Killed in ambush
1950-11-17	SC 39365	Dakar Bin Hamid	—	—	Killed in ambush
1950-11-18	F/PC 405	Din Bin Haji Idris	—	—	Killed in action engaging communist gunmen at Layang Layang Johore
1950-11-18	SC 9432	Chan Tong Fong	—	—	Killed in action engaging communist gunmen at Pahang
1950-11-22	PC 10054	Sarwan Bin Abu Bakar	—	—	Killed in action engaging communist gunmen at Coronation Estate, Johore
1950-11-22	SC	Hussin Bin Ahmad	—	—	Killed in action engaging communist gunmen at Coronation Estate, Johore
1950-11-23	PC 6155	Nasir Bin Salleh	—	—	Ambushed by communist gunmen at Air Kuning Selatan, Gemas, Negeri Sembilan.
1950-11-23	PC 12536	Zakaria Bin Pandak Rewan	—	—	Ambushed by communist gunmen at Air Kuning Selatan, Gemas, Negeri Sembilan.
1950-11-23	EPC 2165	Abdul Bin Yahaya	—	—	Ambushed by communist gunmen at Air Kuning Selatan, Gemas, Negeri Sembilan.
1950-11-23	SC 26144	Yaacob Bin Yusof	—	—	Ambushed by communist gunmen at Air Kuning Selatan, Gemas, Negeri Sembilan.
1950-11-23	SC 34331	Abdul Ghani Bin Lassim	—	—	Ambushed by communist gunmen at Air Kuning Selatan, Gemas, Negeri Sembilan.
1950-11-23	SC 36563	Borhan Bin Mohd Zin	—	—	Ambushed by communist gunmen at Air Kuning Selatan, Gemas, Negeri Sembilan.
1950-11-24	SC/Sgt	Khalid Bin Hassim	—	—	Killed in action engaging communist gunmen at Kedah
1950-11-25	PC 13395	Kusas Bin Haji Othman	—	—	Killed in action at Ruab/Bentong Road
1950-11-29	SC 34272	Dain Bin Mohd Noor	—	—	Killed in action engaging communist gunmen at Ulu Ramis Estate, Johore
1950-12-01	SC 10503	Adiveran s/o Veratheran	—	—	Killed in action engaging communist gunmen at Sungai Tun Estate Selangor
1950-12-02	ASP	A.E.B Bulteel	—	—	Killed in operations, ambushed engaging communist gunmen in Alor Setar, Kedah
1950-12-05	P/Lt 728	W.A. Almond	—	—	Killed in action engaging communist gunmen at Kuala Selangor, Selangor
1950-12-07	SC 17498	Lani Bin Long	—	—	Killed in action engaging communist gunmen at Nanyo Kluang Estate, Johore
1950-12-12	SC 5159	Mat Ross Bin Saidum	—	—	Killed in action engaging communist gunmen at Sikamat Police Post at Negeri Sembilan
1950-12-13	SC 32520	Hassan Bin Che Wan	—	—	Killed in action engaging communist gunmen at Bukir Pilah Estate Bahua, Negeri Sembilan
1950-12-20	SC 6646	Omar Bin Chilappan	—	—	Killed in action engaging communist gunmen at Sisak Mines, Kota Tinggi, Johore
1950-12-20	SC 6657	Bujang Bin Tek	—	—	Killed in action engaging communist gunmen at Sisak Mines, Kota Tinggi, Johore
1950-12-20	SC 39189	A. Bakar Bin Lambak	—	—	Killed in action engaging communist gunmen at Sisak Mines, Kota Tinggi, Johore
1950-12-20	SC 41616	Yunos Bin Khan	—	—	Killed in action engaging communist gunmen at Sisak Mines, Kota Tinggi, Johore
1950-12-20	SC 41619	A. Wahab Bin M. Yunos	—	—	Killed in action engaging communist gunmen at Sisak Mines, Kota Tinggi, Johore
1950-12-22	P/Lt	N.R.R. Magill	—	—	Killed in action engaging communist gunmen during an operation with Jungle Squad at Kuala Kubu area, Selangor
1950-12-23	PC 12947	Omar Bin Kadir	—	—	Killed in action engaging communist gunmen at Sungai Remok Estate, Selangor
1950-12-23	SC 12416	Abd Majid s/o Mydin Pitchay	—	—	Killed in action engaging communist gunmen at Sungai Remok Estate, Selangor
1950-12-24	SC/Sgt	Mohd Majid Bin Hj Mokhti	—	—	Killed in action engaging communist gunmen at Uli Kili Estate, Selangor
1950-12-26	PC 364	Talip Bin Mohamed	—	—	Killed in an operation
1950-12-29	Cadet	N.H.H. Hurst	—	—	Motor Accident
1950-12-29	SC 29377	Doraisamy	—	—	Killed in action engaging communist gunmen Rimba Panjong, Perak
1950-12-30	P/Lt 596	M.R. Livingstone	—	—	Killed in action engaging communist gunmen during an ambush, whilst in charge of a Jungle Squad, investigating a fire at a disused Tin Mine in the Grik area of Perak
1950-12-30	PC	Talip Bin Mohamed	—	—	Killed in action engaging communist gunmen during an ambush, whilst in charge of a Jungle Squad, investigating a fire at a disused Tin Mine in the Grik area of Perak
1950-12-31	Sgt 2422	Shaari Bin Yunus	—	—	Ambushed by communist gunmen at Gurun, Kedah.
1950-12-31	Sgt 2653	A. Rahman Bin Ibrahim	—	—	Ambushed by communist gunmen at Gurun, Kedah.
1950-12-31	Cpl F/7	Saidon Bin Haji A. Rahim	—	—	Ambushed by communist gunmen at Gurun, Kedah.
1950-12-31	F/PC 77	Alron s/o Chuan	—	—	Ambushed by communist gunmen at Gurun, Kedah.
1950-12-31	F/PC 136	Din Bin Jaafar	—	—	Ambushed by communist gunmen at Gurun, Kedah.
1950-12-31	F/PC 143	A. Hamid Bin Ibrahim	—	—	Ambushed by communist gunmen at Gurun, Kedah.
1950-12-31	F/PC 343	Omar Bin Dahaman	—	—	Ambushed by communist gunmen at Gurun, Kedah.
1950-12-31	F/PC 344	Cheow Wan Chai	—	—	Ambushed by communist gunmen at Gurun, Kedah.
1950-12-31	SC 39608	Abdul Manis Bin Awang	—	—	Ambushed by communist gunmen at Gurun, Kedah.
1951-01-01	PC 11260	Abdul Kadir Bin Abdullah	—	—	Killed during an ambush by communist gunmen at Thye Hup Estate Sungai Patani, Kedah
1951-01-01	PC 3652	Akhson Bin Mohd Salleh	—	—	Killed during an ambush by communist gunmen at Thye Hup Estate Sungai Patani, Kedah
1951-01-01	SC/Cpl 8502	Jais Bin Omar	—	—	—
1951-01-01	SC 26793	Osman Bin Yahya	—	—	Killed by a number of communist gunmen at Grisek Estate, Johore
1951-01-01	SC 39344	Ismail Bin Mohd Amin	—	—	Killed by a number of communist gunmen at Grisek Estate, Johore
1951-01-05	PC 832	Idris Bin Mahadi	—	—	Killed in an operation at Chemek, Johore
1951-01-06	SC 13074	Abdul Ghani Bin Yahaya	—	—	Ambushed by communist gunmen at Bikam Estate, Perak.
1951-01-06	SC 20763	Kassim Bin Abdul Samat	—	—	Ambushed by communist gunmen at Bikam Estate, Perak.
1951-01-06	SC 22577	Ibrahim Bin Mohd Noor	—	—	Ambushed by communist gunmen at Bikam Estate, Perak.
1951-01-06	SC 27059	Yaakob Bin Mat Saja	—	—	Ambushed by communist gunmen at Bikam Estate, Perak.
1951-01-06	SC 29920	Saman Bin Tanan	—	—	Ambushed by communist gunmen at Bikam Estate, Perak.
1951-01-07	SC 12861	Amir Bin Johari	—	—	Killed by communist gunmen in the area of Tapah, Perak
1951-01-07	SC 20987	Ebas Bin Ismail	—	—	Killed by communist gunmen in the area of Tapah, Perak
1951-01-07	SC 27990	Ibrahim Bin Noordin	—	—	Killed by communist gunmen in the area of Tapah, Perak
1951-01-13	SC 5705	Ismail Bin Hussain	—	—	Killed by communist gunmen on the Samantan Estate, Pahang
1951-01-13	SC 15814	San Chong	—	—	Killed by communist gunmen on the Samantan Estate, Pahang
1951-01-13	SC 29055	Mohd Zain Bin Singa	—	—	Killed by communist gunmen on the Samantan Estate, Pahang
1951-01-15	SC 16478	Hussain Bin Ahmad	—	—	Killed by communist gunmen at Bentong area
1951-01-15	SC 29255	Hassan Bin Said	—	—	Killed by communist gunmen at Bentong area
1951-01-16	SC 32205	Adam Bin Hj. Omar	—	—	Killed by communist gunmen at Batu Arang
1951-01-16	SC 32266	Arumugam s/o Munian	—	—	Killed by communist gunmen at Batu Arang
1951-01-17	SC 33557	Yeop Bin Manap	—	—	Killed in an operation in Telok Inson, Perak
1951-01-19	EPC 3738	Wong Sin Fook	—	—	Killed at 26th New Village Resettlement area at Kulai
1951-01-20	EPC 3757	Dahlan Bin Montel	—	—	Killed in Muar, Johore
1951-01-23	SC 5644	Ismail	—	—	Killed in an operation
1951-01-29	SC 2629	Ng Fatt Leong	—	—	Killed by communist gunmen at Ayer Kuming, Perak
1951-01-29	SC 3677	Lee Yoong	—	—	Killed by communist gunmen at Ayer Kuming, Perak
1951-01-29	SC 14700	Cheng Kam Kong	—	—	Killed by communist gunmen at Ayer Kuming, Perak
1951-01-30	PC 7765	Abdul Jalil Bin Khalu Rahman	—	—	Killed when 30 communist gunmen ambushed their police car at 4th Kaki Bukit/Padang Besar Road, Kedah
1951-01-30	PC 7824	Said Bin Abas	—	—	Killed when 30 communist gunmen ambushed their police car at 4th Kaki Bukit/Padang Besar Road, Kedah
1951-01-30	PC 7765	Yusof Bin Mohamed	—	—	Killed when 30 communist gunmen ambushed their police car at 4th Kaki Bukit/Padang Besar Road, Kedah
1951-01-30	SC	Sulaiman Bin Abdullah	—	—	Killed when 30 communist gunmen ambushed their police car at 4th Kaki Bukit/Padang Besar Road, Kedah
1951-01-30	SC 3063	Ahmad Bin Hussein	—	—	Killed when 30 communist gunmen ambushed their police car at 4th Kaki Bukit/Padang Besar Road, Kedah
1951-02-01	PC 10256	Saidi Bin Abas	—	—	—
1951-02-01	SC 2834	Mazlan Bin Ngah Abdul Wahab	—	—	Killed by communist gunmen at Pembroke Estate Sungai Siput, Perak
1951-02-01	SC 2898	Sulaiman Bin Abdullah	—	—	Killed by communist gunmen at Pembroke Estate Sungai Siput, Perak
1951-02-01	SC 3052	Mohd Yusoff Bin Thamby	—	—	Killed by communist gunmen at Pembroke Estate Sungai Siput, Perak
1951-02-01	SC 13066	Raja Malik Bin Raja Mat	—	—	Killed by communist gunmen at Pembroke Estate Sungai Siput, Perak
1951-02-01	SC 24623	Raja Aznan Bin Raja Sulaiman	—	—	Killed by communist gunmen at Pembroke Estate Sungai Siput, Perak
1951-02-07	P/Lt 643	J.G. Yapp	—	—	Killed in ambush at Jabor Valley Estate, Pahang
1951-02-08	PC 20107	Man Bin Mohamed	—	—	Killed in Gemas Estate, Johore
1951-02-11	L/Cpl 3618	Ishak	—	—	Killed in an operation in Jonkok, Terengganu
1951-02-12	SC 13319	Shah Bin Panjang Mat Masah	—	—	Killed in Sungai Krudda Estate, Sungai Siput, Perak
1951-02-13	SC 16736	Radin Bin Budin	—	—	Killed in Tanjong Malim Estate, Selangor
1951-02-13	SC 27137	Mohd Sa'ad Bin Salleh	—	—	Killed in Tanjong Malim Estate, Selangor
1951-02-17	PC 10940	Embi Bin Hashim	—	—	Killed by communist gunmen who stopped a minibus at 26th Kuala Kangsar Road
1951-02-18	D/Sgt 521	Ismail Bin Hashim	—	—	Killed in Sungai Dingin Estate, Kulim, Kedah
1951-02-21	SC 19698	Hamzah Bin Dukin	—	—	Killed in an operation at Gambang, Pahang
1951-02-23	SC 13357	Osman Bin Alang Raja	—	—	Killed in operation at Sungai Siput, Perak
1951-02-24	D/PC 613	Lee Ching Kin	—	—	Shot dead by a communist gunman in George Town, Penang
1951-02-24	PC 11764	Mohd Nor Bin Abdul Rani	—	—	Killed in Gemas Estate, Negeri Sembilan
1951-02-25	SC 32859	Kling Bin Topa	—	—	Killed by communist gunmen at Kew Estate, Menchap, Malacca
1951-02-25	SC 32975	Bujang Bin Saban	—	—	Killed by communist gunmen at Kew Estate, Menchap, Malacca
1951-02-25	SC 33032	Hassan Bin Hj. Hussein	—	—	Killed by communist gunmen at Kew Estate, Menchap, Malacca
1951-03-05	SC 16150	Abdul Kadir Bin Awang	—	—	Killed by communist gunmen at Senai Estate, Johore
1951-03-05	SC 16153	Siradi Bin Mohamed	—	—	Killed by communist gunmen at Senai Estate, Johore
1951-03-08	PC 9808	Othman Bin Said	—	—	Killed at Police Station of Kambua South Johore
1951-03-08	P/Lt 837	J.S. Bradley	—	—	Killed in action engaging communist gunmen, died through gunshot wounds in Kuala Kangsar, Perak
1951-03-09	EPC 2755	Talib Bin Sudin	—	—	Killed in an operations at Ruab, Pahang
1951-03-09	PC 403	Abdul Rahman Bin K. Jaafar	—	—	Killed at a Public Works Department Quarry Johore
1951-03-09	SC	(unnamed)	—	—	In Pahang and Johore, 4 Special Constables(unnamed) were killed by communist gunmen
1951-03-09	SC	(unnamed)	—	—	In Pahang and Johore, 4 Special Constables(unnamed) were killed by communist gunmen
1951-03-09	SC	(unnamed)	—	—	In Pahang and Johore, 4 Special Constables(unnamed) were killed by communist gunmen
1951-03-09	SC	(unnamed)	—	—	In Pahang and Johore, 4 Special Constables(unnamed) were killed by communist gunmen
1951-03-11	SC 6658	Wan Abdullah Bin A. Rahman	—	—	Ambushed by communist gunmen at PWD Quarry, Mersing, Johore.
1951-03-11	SC 6804	Hussin Bin Hj Karim	—	—	Ambushed by communist gunmen at PWD Quarry, Mersing, Johore.
1951-03-11	SC 30640	A. Rahman Bin Mohd Amin	—	—	Ambushed by communist gunmen at PWD Quarry, Mersing, Johore.
1951-03-11	SC 30642	Hussin Bin Mohd Salleh	—	—	Ambushed by communist gunmen at PWD Quarry, Mersing, Johore.
1951-03-11	SC 38120	Mohd Ali Bin Osman	—	—	Ambushed by communist gunmen at PWD Quarry, Mersing, Johore.
1951-03-11	SC 39187	Rahmat Bin Mohd Tahir	—	—	Ambushed by communist gunmen at PWD Quarry, Mersing, Johore.
1951-03-12	EPC 2783	Abdullah Bin Omar	—	—	Killed at 25th Kuantan Road
1951-03-13	PC 3556	Gurdial Singh s/o Hira Singh	—	—	Killed in an operation at Jalong Sungai Siput North Perak
1951-03-14	PC 9093	Mohd Bin Mohd Arouf	—	—	Killed at 25th Kuantan Road, Pahang
1951-03-16	PC 540	Anwar Bin Sulaiman	—	—	Killed in an ambush
1951-03-16	PC 5382	Abdul Kadir Bin Buyong	—	—	Killed in an ambush
1951-03-16	PC 7595	Sulaiman Bin Md Akid	—	—	Killed in an ambush
1951-03-19	SC 7070	Lajin Bin Mohamed Akli	—	—	—
1951-03-24	PC 10724	Engku Ahmad Bin Engku Hamid	—	—	—
1951-03-24	SC/Sgt 39278	Tengku Abd Hamid	—	—	—
1951-03-25	SC 16021	Jaafar Bin Kadir	—	—	—
1951-03-26	SC 25085	Darmadas	—	—	—
1951-03-28	Cpl 9478	Yaacob Bin Tan	—	—	—
1951-03-30	PC 4487	Abdul Karim Bin Mohd Yusof	—	—	—
1951-03-30	PC 10936	Shaffie Bin Kamaruddin	—	—	—
1951-03-30	SC 8718	Yunos Bin Malik	—	—	—
1951-03-30	AP 6551	Kee Peng Chia	—	—	—
1951-04-02	AP 16685	Wan Rasdi Bin Wan In	—	—	Killed in Temenggor, Perak
1951-04-02	AP 16686	Wan Khairudin Bin Wan Mushiran	—	—	Killed in Temenggor, Perak
1951-04-02	AP 16825	Abdullah Bin Bor	—	—	Killed in Temenggor, Perak
1951-04-04	P/Lt 684	N. Wride	—	—	Killed in an ambush at Kulim, Kedah
1951-04-05	SC 20112	Lebos Bin Kechik	—	—	Killed in Segamat Estate, Johore
1951-04-09	SC 24614	Bahari Bin Abdul Rahman	—	—	Killed in Sussex Estate, Perak
1951-04-10	AP/Insp	D. Stork	—	—	Killed in Karangan Estate, Kedah
1951-04-13	EPC 2389	Nordin Bin Hj Ahmad	—	—	—
1951-04-14	L/Cpl 11742	Mohd Ali Bin Baba	—	—	—
1951-04-14	PC 2299	Mustafa Bin Din	—	—	—
1951-04-14	PC 8852	Hussein Bin Ngah	—	—	—
1951-04-14	PC 10758	Yahaya Bin Hamid	—	—	—
1951-04-14	PC 10907	Darus Bin Mat	—	—	—
1951-04-14	PC 10920	Din Bin Taib	—	—	—
1951-04-14	EPC 3387	Salim Bin Saad	—	—	Killed in an operation at Sintok Jitra, Kedah
1951-04-16	P/Lt 715	F.P.A. Malone	—	—	Killed in Communist ambush at 26th Batu Arang Road, Rawang, Selangor
1951-04-16	L/Cpl 8565	Mahat Bin Chomik	—	—	Killed in Communist ambush at 26th Batu Arang Road, Rawang, Selangor
1951-04-16	PC 13117	Raban Bin Said	—	—	Killed in Communist ambush at 26th Batu Arang Road, Rawang, Selangor
1951-04-16	PC 13100	Saud Bin Chek	—	—	Killed in Communist ambush at 26th Batu Arang Road, Rawang, Selangor
1951-04-17	SC 13767	Mat Rashid Bin Awang	—	—	Killed in Communist ambush at Lombong-Susur Rotan Road, Kota Tinggi
1951-04-17	EPC 3114	Abdul Majid Bin Tahir	—	—	Killed in Communist ambush at Lombong-Susur Rotan Road, Kota Tinggi
1951-04-17	EPC 2331	Mat Pimus Bin Hassan	—	—	Killed in a Communist Operation near Rompin Bahau Negeri Sembilan
1951-04-18	SC 22876	Ahad Bin Mohamad	—	—	—
1951-04-18	SC 35526	Samad Bin Aman	—	—	—
1951-04-21	SC 7160	Chan Chong Eng	—	—	Killed in a Communist Operation at Segamat, Johore
1951-04-22	SC 26248	Ali Bin Mansor	—	—	Killed in an operation at Kulai area
1951-04-22	SC 6589	Hamzah Bin Sudin	—	—	Killed in an operation at Kulai area
1951-04-23	D/Cpl 660	Lok Ah Thong	—	—	Killed in a Communist Operation at Chemor, Perak
1951-04-23	D/PC 108	Cheh Soo Kiong	—	—	Killed by communist gunmen at Penang
1951-04-23	EPC 262	Saad Bin Hashim	—	—	Killed by communist gunmen at Penang
1951-04-27	SC 15465	Tan Thuan Thong	—	—	—
1951-04-27	SC 22415	Soib Bin Mohd Isa	—	—	Killed in a Communist Operation on Pusing, Perak
1951-04-28	SC 10094	Masri Bin Dinchat	—	—	Killed in an ambush at Lima Belas Estate
1951-05-02	DSP	P.A Doohan	—	—	While investigating a train derailment he was killed by Communist in Batu Arang area of Selangor
1951-05-02	P/Lt	N.R. Nelder	—	—	While investigating a train derailment he was killed by Communist in Batu Arang area of Selangor
1951-05-02	SC 3638	Leong Chin Chuan	—	—	Killed in a Communist Operation in Grik, Perak
1951-05-02	SC 42892	Attan Bin Puteh	—	—	Killed in a Communist Operation in Johore
1951-05-06	PC 9188	Othman Bin Abdul Hamid	—	—	Killed in an operation at Buloh Estate Segamat, Johore
1951-05-07	SC 27251	Sudin Bin Matonis	—	—	Killed in an operation
1951-05-09	PC 10710	Ali Bin Ariffin	—	—	Killed in an operation at Kuantan
1951-05-10	EPC 1381	Kassim Bin Hashim	—	—	Killed engaging communist gunmen near Malim, Nawar
1951-05-15	SC 32742	Ghani Bin Ludin	—	—	—
1951-05-18	PC 358	Abdul Rashid Bin Mat Arof	—	—	Killed in a Communist Operation
1951-05-18	PC 11710	Abdul Manaf Bin Samad	—	—	—
1951-05-21	TPC 15328	Abdullah Bin Nathar	—	—	Killed in a Communist Operation in Fraser's Falls Kelantan
1951-05-23	P/Lt 651	G.T. Mundy	—	—	Killed while travelling with 3 trucks of a Special forces patrol in an ambush at Taiping, Perak
1951-05-23	SC 25596	Mat Bin Man	—	—	Killed while travelling with 3 trucks of a Special forces patrol in an ambush at Taiping, Perak
1951-05-23	SC 14174	Loh Foo Kim	—	—	Killed while travelling with 3 trucks of a Special forces patrol in an ambush at Taiping, Perak
1951-05-23	PC 8155	Mohamed Bin Mohd Noor	—	—	—
1951-05-23	PC 9269	Mohamed Bin Talib	—	—	—
1951-05-26	PC 7446	Abas Bin Abdul Hamid	—	—	Killed in an operation at Muar, Johore
1951-05-30	Cpl 1938	Mohd Yusof Bin Abdul Rahman	—	—	—
1951-06-05	PC 16550	Mohd Noor Bin Yusof	—	—	—
1951-06-05	PC 39464	Salleh Bin Abdul Kadir	—	—	—
1951-06-10	PC 11662	Mohamed Rasol Bin Hj. Amin	—	—	—
1951-06-10	TPC 15221	Ahmad Bin Harun	—	—	—
1951-06-11	PC 12339	Mat Lazim Bin Ibrahim	—	—	—
1951-06-12	PC 12652	Razali Bin Yeop	—	—	—
1951-06-12	EPC 3825	Abdul Ghani Bin Mohd	—	—	—
1951-06-12	EPC 3831	A. Wahab Bin Ali	—	—	—
1951-06-13	SC/Cpl 8242	Mamat Yunos Bin Abdul Malek	—	—	—
1951-06-13	SC 35787	Abdul Ghani Bin Mohamed	—	—	—
1951-06-16	PC 8047	Din Bin Othman	—	—	—
1951-06-17	SC 6396	Baba Bin Bidin	—	—	—
1951-06-18	SC 9112	Suailan Bin Kasan	—	—	—
1951-06-18	SC 19615	Manap Bin Tonkin	—	—	—
1951-06-22	SC 29862	Mat Selidin Bin Alang	—	—	—
1951-06-26	EPC 444	Alias Bin A. Rahman	—	—	Killed in an operation at Perak
1951-06-27	D/Cpl 641	Foong Poon Yuen	—	—	Killed in an operation in Nibong Tebal
1951-06-28	SC 3862	Noman Bin Salleh	—	—	Ambushed by communist gunmen at Kajang, Selangor.
1951-06-28	SC 4847	Osman Bin Abdul Kassim	—	—	Ambushed by communist gunmen at Kajang, Selangor.
1951-06-28	SC 12092	Mansor Bin Yassin	—	—	Ambushed by communist gunmen at Kajang, Selangor.
1951-06-28	SC 32417	Shariff Bin Daulah	—	—	Ambushed by communist gunmen at Kajang, Selangor.
1951-06-28	SC 32419	Harun Bin Ibrahim	—	—	Ambushed by communist gunmen at Kajang, Selangor.
1951-06-28	SC 32437	Handan Bin Hj Sama	—	—	Ambushed by communist gunmen at Kajang, Selangor.
1951-07-01	TPC 18559	Samsudin Bin Ariffin	—	—	Killed on operation at Sungai Patani
1951-07-01	SC 7629	Ismail Bin Mahmood	—	—	Killed on operation at Kuala Krai area in Kelantan
1951-07-01	SC 8020	Jaya Bin Mat Tahir	—	—	Killed on operation at Kuala Krai area in Kelantan
1951-07-04	Insp	S.S. Cook	—	—	Killed in an operation at Machis, Pahang
1951-07-04	SC 15615	Wahab Bin Sulaiman	—	—	Killed when a number of Communist gunmen attacked the Chung King Tin Mine
1951-07-04	SC 19419	Awang Bin Ujang	—	—	Killed when a number of Communist gunmen attacked the Chung King Tin Mine
1951-07-05	SC 32442	Zainal Abidin Bin Mohd Rauf	—	—	—
1951-07-06	SC 17240	Abdul Talib Bin Hj. Sebari	—	—	—
1951-07-06	SC 33863	Jamak Bin Keman	—	—	—
1951-07-07	SC 5305	Jalil	—	—	—
1951-07-07	SC 5899	Abdul Hashim	—	—	—
1951-07-07	SC 8316	Mohamad	—	—	—
1951-07-07	SC 25796	Adam	—	—	—
1951-07-08	SC 639	Wan Boon Bin Hassan	—	—	—
1951-07-08	SC 37551	Osman Bin Jaafar	—	—	—
1951-07-08	AP 19824	Awang Kechik Bin Dosah	—	—	—
1951-07-09	P/Lt 791	J.W. Chown	—	—	anti-Communist duties Segamat, Johore
1951-07-09	PC 1890	Samsuddin Bin Omar	—	—	—
1951-07-09	SC 34132	Chik Bin Tabah	—	—	Ambushed by communist gunmen at Anglo-Johore Estate in Bekok, Segamat, Johore.
1951-07-14	P/Lt 501	G.O. Hartley	—	—	Killed while on anti-Communist duties at Kuantan, Pahang
1951-07-14	P/Lt 848	F.J.J. Thonger	—	—	Killed while on anti-Communist duties at Terap road, Kedah
1951-07-15	SC 8153	Wan Endut Bin Sulaiman	—	—	—
1951-07-15	SC 8426	Aziz Bin Hashim	—	—	—
1951-07-15	SC 28852	Alias Bin Embong	—	—	—
1951-07-16	AP 2578	Jamal Bin Tahim	—	—	—
1951-07-17	EPC 3656	Mohd Aris	—	—	—
1951-07-17	SC 15836	Mohamed Bin Ismail	—	—	—
1951-07-17	SC 23710	Awang Bin Ali	—	—	—
1951-07-17	SC 23788	Mahat Bin Jaafar	—	—	—
1951-07-19	SC 33570	Samsudin Bin Hj. Idris	—	—	—
1951-07-21	P/Lt 765	A.E. Mothersole	—	—	Killed while on anti-Communist duties at Ulu Yam, Selangor
1951-07-22	SC 42455	Morad	—	—	—
1951-07-23	SC/Cpl 8892	Abu Bakar Bin Ishak	—	—	—
1951-07-23	SC 8526	Yusoff Bin Karim	—	—	—
1951-07-23	SC 23868	Long Bin Wahid	—	—	—
1951-07-23	SC 42838	Kovil Pitchay	—	—	—
1951-07-24	Cpl 18352	Abdul Manaf	—	—	—
1951-08-03	SC 28151	Ibrahim Bin Yeop Hamzah	—	—	—
1951-08-04	PC 16588	Ng Weng Fong	—	—	—
1951-08-04	SC 16588	Ng Weng Fong	—	—	—
1951-08-04	SC 21124	Abdul Halim Bin Mat Wajid	—	—	—
1951-08-04	SC 21130	Abdul Halim Bin Ngah Sain	—	—	—
1951-08-12	Cpl 1223	Shahabudin	—	—	—
1951-08-12	PC 10607	Shaari Bin Jefar	—	—	—
1951-08-12	PC 10616	Nayan Bin Omar	—	—	—
1951-08-12	EPC 2156	Dahlan Bin Montel	—	—	—
1951-08-12	EPC 2323	Muruggaih s/o Muthu	—	—	—
1951-08-12	EPC 2395	Abdul Sahid Bin Yeop Darus	—	—	Ambushed on a Rubber Estate in Batu Gajah, Perak
1951-08-12	SC 21074	Arshad Bin Nasir	—	—	—
1951-08-13	SC 33983	Abu Bakar Bin Jaafar	—	—	—
1951-08-16	PC 6926	Osman Bin Hanapiah	—	—	—
1951-08-18	Cpl 1960	Othman Bin Hassan	—	—	Ambushed by communist gunmen at Air Keroh, Malacca.
1951-08-18	L/Cpl 6002	Mohd Bin Hitam	—	—	Ambushed by communist gunmen at Air Keroh, Malacca.
1951-08-18	SC 2760	Naim Bin Murad	—	—	Ambushed by communist gunmen at Air Keroh, Malacca.
1951-08-18	SC 38065	Zainudin Bin Yunus	—	—	Ambushed by communist gunmen at Air Keroh, Malacca.
1951-08-18	SC 38066	Borhan Bin Hj Yunus	—	—	Ambushed by communist gunmen at Air Keroh, Malacca.
1951-08-18	SC 38085	Mohd Kasim Bin Yusop	—	—	Ambushed by communist gunmen at Air Keroh, Malacca.
1951-08-18	SC 44468	Wong Dek @ Bong Kok Keng	—	—	Ambushed by communist gunmen at Air Keroh, Malacca.
1951-08-19	Cadet	W.K. Batchelor	—	—	Killed in an operation at Ulu Dungun, Terengganu
1951-08-20	ASP	E.F Rainford D.S.O.M.C	—	—	Killed in action in Rawang, Selangor
1951-08-20	SC/Cpl 21693	Ariffin Bin Abdul Ghani	—	—	—
1951-08-20	SC 14270	Kamaruddin Bin Mat Hassan	—	—	—
1951-08-20	SC 14289	Abdul Rani Bin Samad	—	—	—
1951-08-20	SC 15389	Shahudin Bin Pandak	—	—	—
1951-08-22	PC 4521	Mohd Zaman Bin Abd Majid	—	—	—
1951-08-22	PC 10607	Abd Rahman Bin Long	—	—	—
1951-08-22	PC 13435	Latif Bin Mohd Ghani	—	—	—
1951-08-23	SC/Cpl 2698	G. Krishnan	—	—	—
1951-08-25	SC 19267	Ibrahim Bin Hassan	—	—	—
1951-08-28	SC/Cpl 18623	Abdullah Bin Saad	—	—	—
1951-08-28	SC 36312	Mat Isa Bin Puteh	—	—	—
1951-08-29	SC 29333	Abdul Aziz Bin Alang Abdul	—	—	—
1951-09-01	SC 2845	Mohd Yusof Bin Mohamed	—	—	—
1951-09-03	AP/Insp	L.V Brown	—	—	Killed in action engaging communist gunmen in Sungai Siput area, Perak
1951-09-03	AP	C.R Park	—	—	Killed in action engaging communist gunmen in Sungai Siput area, Perak
1951-09-03	AP	J.L Garnham	—	—	Killed in action engaging communist gunmen in Sungai Siput area, Perak
1951-09-03	SC 9312	Idris Bin Tahar	—	—	—
1951-09-04	SC 2628	Wazir Bin Jamin	—	—	—
1951-09-10	SC 37050	Abdul Manaf Bin Bakar	—	—	—
1951-09-13	SC 22662	Mat Rasul Bin Wan Chik	—	—	—
1951-09-14	Cpl 5715	Muda Bin Othman	—	—	—
1951-09-17	SC/Sgt 7123	Mohamed Yassin Bin Sunan	—	—	—
1951-09-19	SC 24193	Mohamed Isa Bin Lazis	—	—	—
1951-09-19	SC 26893	Husein Bin Buyong	—	—	—
1951-09-19	SC 31894	Santhanam Bin Kodandai	—	—	—
1951-09-19	SC 32688	Arshad Bin Sidong	—	—	—
1951-09-21	AP 950	Mustapha Bin Yacob	—	—	—
1951-09-21	SC 8286	Wan Empok Bin Osman	—	—	—
1951-09-24	PC 5145	Zakariah Bin Mohamad	—	—	—
1951-09-24	SC 1560	Lin Bin Saad	—	—	—
1951-09-24	SC 9680	Khalip Bin Samsudin	—	—	—
1951-09-24	SC 10228	Abdullah Bin Maidin	—	—	—
1951-09-24	SC 27169	Idris Bin Mohamed Darus	—	—	—
1951-09-27	SC 40634	Ong Kok Han	—	—	Killed in a Communist Operation at Bruas/Batu Hampur Road, Perak
1951-09-28	AP	K.D.H. Reader	—	—	AP K.D.H. Reader was an Assistant Manager of Central Paloh Estate. he was killed in action in Central Paloh Estate
1951-10-02	P/Lt 840	B. Talks	—	—	Killed in a Communist Operation in Bukit Patang Kerteh, Terengganu
1951-10-02	SC 35618	Ismail Bin Abdullah	—	—	Killed in a Communist Operation in Bukit Patang Kerteh, Terengganu
1951-10-06	P/Lt 833	H.G. Marcon	—	—	killed in a Communist Operation in Kuantan, Pahang
1951-10-07	SC 15509	Muda Bin Yusoff	—	—	—
1951-10-10	P/Lt 585	F.G. Belsham	—	—	Killed while on anti-Communist duties at Edau River, Johore/Pahang boundary
1951-10-10	SC/Cpl 7240	Abdul Aziz Bin Abdul Rahman	—	—	—
1951-10-10	PC 13519	Babjee	—	—	—
1951-10-10	PC 13984	Abdul Aziz Bin Mahmood	—	—	—
1951-10-10	SC 18999	Haron Bin Abdul Samad	—	—	—
1951-10-10	SC 19038	Ali Deman Bin Mat	—	—	—
1951-10-10	SC 19114	Mat Taha Bin Othman	—	—	—
1951-10-10	SC 20441	Mohd Tahir Bin Ngah Mat Arof	—	—	—
1951-10-11	SC/Cpl 8904	Syed Mohamed Noor Bin Syed Hamzah	—	—	—
1951-10-14	L/Cpl 16478	Haron Bin Suek	—	—	—
1951-10-14	FJC 10557	Abdullah Bin Bidin	—	—	—
1951-10-14	PC 16557	Abdullah Bin Bidin	—	—	—
1951-10-14	SC 24045	Mohamed Bin Samat	—	—	—
1951-10-15	SC 15140	Mohd Taib Bin Dali	—	—	—
1951-10-18	SC 35020	Shaharudin Bin Jai	—	—	—
1951-10-21	PC 10937	Abdullah Bin Hassan	—	—	—
1951-10-21	PC 11783	Nayan Bin Akil	—	—	—
1951-10-22	L/Cpl 88	Sulaiman Bin Mustapa	—	—	—
1951-10-22	PC 1869	Md Noor Bin Abd Karim	—	—	—
1951-10-22	EPC 3052	Hussein Bin Mohd Yunus	—	—	—
1951-10-22	SC 5066	Abu Bakar Bin Sulaiman	—	—	—
1951-10-22	SC 16941	Bathumalai s/o Pandiah	—	—	—
1951-10-23	EPC 2437	S. Muttiah	—	—	—
1951-10-23	SC 832	Saad	—	—	—
1951-10-25	SC 20579	Hassan Bin Sohor	—	—	—
1951-11-08	Cpl 9556	Ibrahim Bin Mat	—	—	—
1951-11-08	PC 12034	Haris Bin Md Nafis	—	—	—
1951-11-10	PC 11603	Ahmad	—	—	—
1951-11-10	SC 44211	Mohd Yusof Bin Omar	—	—	—
1951-11-12	PC 9508	Omar Bin Yusoff	—	—	—
1951-11-12	SC 23861	Ismail Bin Omar	—	—	—
1951-11-12	SC 23867	Jaafar Bin Johari	—	—	—
1951-11-13	EPC 618	Othman Bin Awang	—	—	Ambushed by communist gunmen at Kampar, Perak.
1951-11-13	SC 2490	Lee Kim Huat	—	—	Ambushed by communist gunmen at Kampar, Perak.
1951-11-13	SC 14402	Ahmad Bin Tahir	—	—	Ambushed by communist gunmen at Kampar, Perak.
1951-11-13	SC 15031	Mohd Yusof Bin Munshi	—	—	Ambushed by communist gunmen at Kampar, Perak.
1951-11-13	SC 15322	Lee Tiam Soy	—	—	Ambushed by communist gunmen at Kampar, Perak.
1951-11-13	SC 15380	Abdul Wahab Bin Ismail	—	—	Ambushed by communist gunmen at Kampar, Perak.
1951-11-13	SC 20876	Mohd Yunus Bin Pandak	—	—	Ambushed by communist gunmen at Kampar, Perak.
1951-11-13	SC 20970	Daud Bin Olong	—	—	Ambushed by communist gunmen at Kampar, Perak.
1951-11-13	SC 28069	Abdul Hamid Bin Alias	—	—	Ambushed by communist gunmen at Kampar, Perak.
1951-11-14	PC 13931	Ahmad Bin Mempri	—	—	Killed in Communist ambush
1951-11-16	P/Lt 737	R.L. Good	—	—	Killed while on anti-Communist duties Tapah, Perak
1951-11-16	SC 22620	Karim Bin Dasara	—	—	—
1951-11-18	SC 6318	Idris Bin Hj. Ahmad	—	—	—
1951-11-24	SC 3666	Suleiman Bin Mohamad	—	—	—
1951-12-05	SC 18720	Mohd Amin Bin Saeman	—	—	—
1951-12-05	SC 18726	Jabbar Bin Reben	—	—	—
1951-12-09	D/PC 76	Ong Kok Lye	—	SB	Killed in an operation
1951-12-09	SC 28120	Mat Nasib Bin Pandak Shubor	—	—	—
1951-12-11	SC 28015	Itam Bin Saad	—	—	—
1951-12-18	PC 10962	Ibrahim	—	—	—
1951-12-18	SC 9099	Awi Bin Matshah	—	—	—
1951-12-18	SC 36673	Koming Bin Hj Ariffin	—	—	—
1951-12-20	L/Cpl 1331	Rattan Singh	—	—	Died by accident at a Rifle range Kuala Kubu Baru, Selangor
1951-12-21	EPC 2474	Shaikh Latiff	—	—	—
1951-12-26	PC 222	Abdul Karim Bin Hadi	—	—	—
1951-12-29	SC 8754	Sanusi Bin Hassan	—	—	—
1951-12-31	SC 25906	Jafar Bin Abdul Hamid	—	—	—
1952-01-10	Sgt 1211	Mohd Ali Bin Sudin	—	—	Ambushed by communist gunmen at Batu 31 ½ Jln Degong.
1952-01-10	PC 4233	Baharom Bin Suraidi	—	—	Ambushed by communist gunmen at Batu 31 ½ Jln Degong.
1952-01-10	PC 11903	Malek Bin Mohd	—	—	Ambushed by communist gunmen at Batu 31 ½ Jln Degong.
1952-01-10	EPC 583	Mohd Amin Bin Alwi	—	—	Ambushed by communist gunmen at Batu 31 ½ Jln Degong.
1952-01-10	SC 14722	Tang Ah Chen	—	—	Ambushed by communist gunmen at Batu 31 ½ Jln Degong.
1952-01-10	SC 24931	Sulaiman Bin Yunus	—	—	Ambushed by communist gunmen at Batu 31 ½ Jln Degong.
1952-01-10	SC 24988	Arshad Bin Ibrahim	—	—	Ambushed by communist gunmen at Batu 31 ½ Jln Degong.
1952-01-10	SC 40353	Chew Fui	—	—	Ambushed by communist gunmen at Batu 31 ½ Jln Degong.
1952-01-10	SC 40760	Razak Bin Tawang	—	—	Ambushed by communist gunmen at Batu 31 ½ Jln Degong.
1952-01-12	AP/Insp	P.B. Madden	—	—	Killed while on anti-Communist duties at Tanah Merah Estate, Port Dickson, Sembilan
1952-01-16	L/Cpl 5283	Mior Mohd Bin Tahir	—	—	—
1952-01-16	PC 3870	Mohd Bin Abdul Kadir	—	—	—
1952-01-16	PC 3895	Abdullah Bin Kechil	—	—	—
1952-01-16	SC 14579	Norbi Bin Songah	—	—	—
1952-01-16	SC 28181	Idris Bin Zainal	—	—	—
1952-01-16	SC 40161	Wan Man Bin Wan Nek	—	—	—
1952-01-19	EPC 2927	Che Mood Bin Daud	—	—	—
1952-01-22	P/Lt 538	A.E. Benson	—	—	Killed in Action engaging Communist while leading a police party in Sendu Gopeng, Perak. Three communist were also killed. P/Lt 538 was shot in the stomach by a sentry and died.
1952-01-25	AP/Insp	E.D. Harding	—	—	Manager of Lothian Estate in Sapang District, Negeri Sembilan, while driving his car to bungalow he was hit by 18 bullets fired by Communist gunmen.
1952-01-28	EPC 3225	Subramaniam s/o Kandiah	—	—	—
1952-01-28	SC 13662	Ya akob Bin Mat	—	—	—
1952-01-28	SC 40916	Othman Bin Abdullah	—	—	—
1952-01-31	P/Lt 458	F.L. Bruce	—	—	Killed during an engagement with Communist gunmen on Wan Lee Hydraulic Mine in Chemor, Perak
1952-01-31	SC/Cpl 2257	Ahmad Bin Awang	—	—	—
1952-01-31	EPC 2454	Mat Tuah Bin Uda	—	—	—
1952-02-02	SC 42205	Mohamed Sain Bin Ahmad	—	—	—
1952-02-04	SC 21054	Osman Bin Hj. Manan	—	—	—
1952-02-07	SC 19045	Hussein Bin Yahaya	—	—	—
1952-02-12	ASP	R.H Jesse	—	—	ASP R.H Jesse and 3 Police Constables (unnamed) were killed by Communist gunmen in a car ambush in Jerum Area, Kuala Selangor.
1952-02-12	PC	(unnamed)	—	—	ASP R.H Jesse and 3 Police Constables (unnamed) were killed by Communist gunmen in a car ambush in Jerum Area, Kuala Selangor.
1952-02-12	PC	(unnamed)	—	—	ASP R.H Jesse and 3 Police Constables (unnamed) were killed by Communist gunmen in a car ambush in Jerum Area, Kuala Selangor.
1952-02-12	PC	(unnamed)	—	—	ASP R.H Jesse and 3 Police Constables (unnamed) were killed by Communist gunmen in a car ambush in Jerum Area, Kuala Selangor.
1952-02-12	SC 27446	Hashim Bin Mohd Ali	—	—	Killed in a Communist Operation at Merbua Estate, Selangor
1952-02-12	SC 4509	Sulaiman Bin Hj. Abdul Rahman	—	—	Killed in a Communist Operation at Merbua Estate, Selangor
1952-02-15	P/Lt 159	A.J. Brosnan	—	—	Killed while on anti-Communist duties Kluang, Johore
1952-02-15	SC 25820	Samiom Bin Zainal	—	—	—
1952-02-18	SC 6106	Mat Sap Bin Md Jai	—	—	—
1952-02-20	SC 6657	Ismail Bin Limbo	—	—	—
1952-02-20	SC 6697	Mohamed Bin Awang	—	—	—
1952-02-20	SC 8730	Sariman Bin Keromotinoyo	—	—	—
1952-02-26	SC 8741	Yusoff Bin Suki	—	—	—
1952-02-27	SC 1442	Said Bin Sakariah	—	—	—
1952-02-27	SC 20470	Yin Bin Mat Isa	—	—	—
1952-02-27	SC 30349	Ahmad Bin Ali	—	—	—
1952-02-29	AP/Insp	L.A. Murray	—	—	Killed in Communist ambush on Heawood Estate Rubber/Tin near Sungai Siput
1952-02-29	SC 13371	Aminudin Bin Abd Manap	—	—	Killed in Communist ambush on Heawood Estate Rubber/Tin near Sungai Siput
1952-02-29	SC 1767	Ahmad Bin Hashim	—	—	—
1952-03-11	ASP	V.H Franks	—	Jungle Squad	Killed in a gunfight in jungle of Kulim, Kedah
1952-03-11	PC 16772	Karim Bin Tahir	—	Jungle Squad	Killed in a gunfight in jungle of Kulim, Kedah
1952-03-11	PC 18692	Hassan Basari Bin Endut	—	Jungle Squad	Killed in a gunfight in jungle of Kulim, Kedah
1952-03-11	SC 15046	Jamhary Bin Mat	—	—	—
1952-03-11	SC 15215	Hairuddin Bin Yassin	—	—	—
1952-03-16	P/Lt	L.R. Mansfield	—	—	Killed in a Communist Operation engaging Communist forces in Sungai Lembing area of kuatan, Pahang
1952-03-16	SC/Cpl 15827	Samat Mohamed Jan Bin Sayed Hussein	—	—	—
1952-03-16	PC 11164	Baharom Bin Wan Teh	—	—	—
1952-03-16	SC 5843	Rahamed Bin Hj Hassan	—	—	—
1952-03-18	PC 9534	Mohd Taib Bin Tahir	—	—	—
1952-03-18	PC 17791	Ibrahim Bin Ahmad	—	—	—
1952-03-19	PC 19284	Abdullah Bin Kamad	—	—	—
1952-03-19	PC 19837	Mat Desa Bin Yeop	—	—	—
1952-03-19	PC 19841	Kamarudin Bin Chee	—	—	—
1952-03-19	SC 16191	Kimin Bin Manap	—	—	—
1952-03-20	PC 226	Manan Bin Fakir	—	—	—
1952-03-20	PC 10008	Mohd Noor Bin Mohd	—	—	—
1952-03-21	PC 5854	Sudin Bin Md Yunos	—	—	—
1952-03-24	PC 3411	Shamsuddin Bin Mohd Zain	—	—	—
1952-03-24	SC 33732	Abdul Aziz Bin Ngah Mat Aros	—	—	—
1952-03-25	PC 3495	Loo Thye Lim	—	—	Killed in an Operation at Tanjung Malim, Perak
1952-03-25	PC 5375	Ahmad Bin Johari	—	—	Killed in an Operation at Tanjung Malim, Perak
1952-03-25	PC 9011	Wan Salleh Bin Wan Ismail	—	—	Killed in an Operation at Tanjung Malim, Perak
1952-03-25	PC 10540	Abdul Rahman Bin Che Ali	—	—	Killed in an Operation at Tanjung Malim, Perak
1952-03-25	PC 11687	Haron Bin Ismail	—	—	Killed in an Operation at Tanjung Malim, Perak
1952-03-27	SC 2831	Muniandy s/o Malai Cettiar	—	—	—
1952-03-28	SC 9729	Ahmad Bin Yusof	—	—	—
1952-03-28	SC 28382	Mohamed Abas Bin Hj Taib	—	—	—
1952-03-28	SC 33534	Abdul Hamid Bin Alang	—	—	—
1952-03-29	AP/Insp	G.C. Stevens	—	—	Resident Manager of Idris Hydraulic Tin Mine, accidentally shot by a Special Constable
1952-03-29	SC 9835	Mohd Astar Bin Lebai Yusof	—	—	—
1952-03-29	SC 9989	Zakaria Bin Mat Noor	—	—	—
1952-03-29	SC 10064	Baharom Bin Yeop Mohamed	—	—	—
1952-03-30	SC 28295	Manickam s/o Sinasamy	—	—	—
1952-04-01	PC 4730	Ismail Bin Busu	—	—	—
1952-04-01	SC 8950	Hassan Bin Hj Osman	—	—	—
1952-04-03	Insp I/886	Zainal Rashid Bin Nordin	—	—	Ambushed by communist gunmen at Kuala Kerai, Kelantan.
1952-04-03	PC 15219	Harun Bin Ya'acob	—	—	Ambushed by communist gunmen at Kuala Kerai, Kelantan.
1952-04-03	PC 15230	Omar Bin Sa'amah	—	—	Ambushed by communist gunmen at Kuala Kerai, Kelantan.
1952-04-03	PC 15254	Ali Bin Mohamad	—	—	Ambushed by communist gunmen at Kuala Kerai, Kelantan.
1952-04-03	PC 15274	Daud Bin Idris	—	—	Ambushed by communist gunmen at Kuala Kerai, Kelantan.
1952-04-03	PC 15312	Mamat Bin Husin	—	—	Ambushed by communist gunmen at Kuala Kerai, Kelantan.
1952-04-08	L/Cpl 8199	Zainal Bin Ibrahim	—	—	—
1952-04-08	PC 4285	Sidek Bin Muda	—	—	—
1952-04-08	PC 13428	Kamaruddin Bin A. Rahman	—	—	—
1952-04-15	PC 9102	Katan Bin Mohd	—	—	—
1952-04-15	PC 10650	Tuan Bin Yahaya	—	—	—
1952-04-15	SC 640	Hassan Bin Jaafar	—	—	—
1952-04-16	P/Lt 519	L.C. Cawthrs	—	—	Killed while on anti-Communist duties at Johore Bahru to Pontian road, Johore
1952-04-16	SC 26336	Abdul Majid Bin Abdul Karim	—	—	Killed while on anti-Communist duties at Johore Bahru to Pontian road, Johore
1952-04-19	PC 12532	Tuan Bin Yahaya	—	—	—
1952-04-19	PC 17635	Salleh Bin Wok	—	—	—
1952-04-19	PC 17638	Ahmad Bin Idris	—	—	—
1952-04-19	PC 17643	Razali Bin Dolah	—	—	—
1952-04-20	SC 39637	Mohamed Bin Yusof	—	—	—
1952-04-27	SC 9580	Zainal Abidin Bin Hj Baka	—	—	—
1952-04-28	EPC 4083	Haron Bin Awang	—	—	—
1952-05-04	L/Cpl 8795	Omar Bin Chik	—	—	—
1952-05-04	SC 38209	Abidin Bin Sumi	—	—	—
1952-05-04	SC 39222	Abdul Rahman Bin Mohamed	—	—	—
1952-05-14	AP/Insp	R. Berlin	—	—	AP/Insp R.Berlin is an Assistant Manager of Telok Sengat Estate. He was killed during anti-Communist duties at Genteng Div. of Telok, Sengat Estate.
1952-05-14	SC 30575	Yassin Bin Moharam	—	—	—
1952-05-14	SC 30626	Kassim Bin Awang	—	—	—
1952-05-19	SC 31258	Mohamed Bin Ismail	—	—	—
1952-05-20	SC 4800	Mat Bin Busoh	—	—	—
1952-05-24	PC 9128	Ahmad Bin Shahar	—	—	—
1952-05-25	SC 39846	Ajat Bin Alok	—	—	—
1952-05-26	P/Lt 1089	A.R. Frazer	—	—	Killed in operation in Kulai, Johore
1952-05-26	PC 8163	Mohamed	—	—	Killed in operation in Kulai, Johore
1952-05-26	EPC 3460	Ariffin	—	—	—
1952-05-28	PC 1207	Ismail Bin Md Yusof	—	—	—
1952-06-02	PC 13331	Ali Bin Salleh	—	—	Ambushed by communist gunmen at Batu 3 1/3 Keramat Pulai Tin Mines, Perak.
1952-06-02	SC 1376	Abdullah Bin Ayob	—	—	Ambushed by communist gunmen at Batu 3 1/3 Keramat Pulai Tin Mines, Perak.
1952-06-02	SC 15288	Abdul Rani Bin K. Salleh	—	—	Ambushed by communist gunmen at Batu 3 1/3 Keramat Pulai Tin Mines, Perak.
1952-06-02	SC 22212	Azri Bin Baki	—		Ambushed by communist gunmen at Batu 3 1/3 Keramat Pulai Tin Mines, Perak.
1952-06-02	SC 22422	Abu Bin Sultan Salleh	—	—	Ambushed by communist gunmen at Batu 3 1/3 Keramat Pulai Tin Mines, Perak.
1952-06-02	SC 25260	Salleh Bin Ajim	—	—	Ambushed by communist gunmen at Batu 3 1/3 Keramat Pulai Tin Mines, Perak.
1952-06-02	SC 28119	Abas Bin Ismail	—	—	Ambushed by communist gunmen at Batu 3 1/3 Keramat Pulai Tin Mines, Perak.
1952-06-02	SC 29954	Chen Ah Hong	—	—	Ambushed by communist gunmen at Batu 3 1/3 Keramat Pulai Tin Mines, Perak.
1952-06-02	SC 33346	Hussin Bin Ahmad	—	—	Ambushed by communist gunmen at Batu 3 1/3 Keramat Pulai Tin Mines, Perak.
1952-06-08	EPC 3475	Alias Bin Mohd	—	—	—
1952-06-08	SC 36806	Sulaiman Bin Ayob	—	—	—
1952-06-14	SC 19851	Jom Bin Abu	—	—	—
1952-06-14	SC 27978	Mohamed Bin Yob Mat Saeh	—	—	—
1952-06-19	Insp I/502	Din Bin Ibrahim	—	—	Insp I/502 and a civilian were killed in Taiping, Perak
1952-06-30	AP/Insp	F.H Eilkins	—	—	Ambushed by communist gunmen at Bekok, Segamat, Johore.
1952-06-30	AP 562	Yahya Bin Abbas	—	—	Ambushed by communist gunmen at Bekok, Segamat, Johore.
1952-07-01	SC 30255	Jaafar Bin Abdul Ghani	—	—	Ambushed by communist gunmen at Anglo-Johore Estate, Bekok, Segamat, Johore.
1952-07-01	SC 42907	Mohd Bin Dena Khan	—	—	Ambushed by communist gunmen at Anglo-Johore Estate, Bekok, Segamat, Johore.
1952-07-04	SC/Sgt 4346	Jali Bin Hj Taib	—	—	—
1952-07-04	SC 27171	Ahmad Bin Achik	—	—	—
1952-07-04	SC 35071	Sahak Bin Long	—	—	—
1952-07-08	P/Lt 495	D. Wedgewood	—	—	Killed in an operation in Sungai Krai, Kelantan
1952-07-17	SC 25836	Weir Bin Darbar	—	—	—
1952-07-26	SC 38250	Hasrak Bin Jamjan	—	—	—
1952-07-28	SC 40089	Wan Mat Bin Wan Ngah	—	—	—
1952-08-12	Insp	Arthur Abishegam	—	—	When receiving an information that the truck was burnt out at the Bukit Jalor, 13 police officers led by Abhishegam boarded the GMC armoured car from the police station to reach about four miles from Hutan Simpan Bukit Jalor, Air Kuning Selatan, Negeri Sembilan when all members continued on foot while the vehicle was left on the roadside. Approximately two miles in, they did not find anything, and finally, they found a burning truck and the flames were still burning the vehicle. Without suspecting explosion of the burning vehicle, Abishegam decided to leave the vehicle. While en route after about a quarter miles, the communist gunmen believed to be from the 10th regiment measuring around 100 men waiting for an ambushed with Bren guns. The police officers were also supplied with one Bren Gun but had suffered stoppagges and the officer who was carrying the Bren ammunition was also shot and died instantly. Eight officers were killed, and three critically wounded while two more officers survived.
1952-08-12	L/Cpl 372	Ahmad Bin Yakim	—	—	
1952-08-12	PC 2664	Alias Bin Tamin	—	—	
1952-08-12	TPC 24204	Yusof Bin Mohd	—	—	
1952-08-12	SC 5108	Manap Bin Mohamed	—	—	
1952-08-12	SC 5279	Tan Ah Lee	—	—	
1952-08-12	SC 5585	Mohamed Jani Bin Pais	—	—	
1952-08-12	SC 21649	Mohd Yassin Bin Mohamed	—	—	
1952-08-16	AP/Insp	A.F. Nightingale	—	—	Killed in Selaba Estate, Telok Anson
1952-08-18	AP/Insp	G.M. Burns	—	—	Ambushed by communist gunmen at Reverview Estate, Perak.
1952-08-18	SC/Cpl 22386	Jamaludin Bin Mat Ali	—	—	Ambushed by communist gunmen at Reverview Estate, Perak.
1952-08-18	SC 17290	Mohd Nor Bin Hj Asip	—	—	Ambushed by communist gunmen at Reverview Estate, Perak.
1952-08-18	SC 21281	Yang Bin Mat Ali	—	—	Ambushed by communist gunmen at Reverview Estate, Perak.
1952-08-18	SC 22261	Kassam Bin Osman	—	—	Ambushed by communist gunmen at Reverview Estate, Perak.
1952-08-18	SC 22271	Noordin Bin Abdullah	—	—	Ambushed by communist gunmen at Reverview Estate, Perak.
1952-08-18	SC 22361	Kathmuthu s/o Kannusamy	—	—	Ambushed by communist gunmen at Reverview Estate, Perak.
1952-08-18	SC 29638	Abdullah Bin Minti	—	—	Ambushed by communist gunmen at Reverview Estate, Perak.
1952-09-09	SC 9057	Abu Bin Sam	—	—	—
1952-09-30	SC 38272	Ibrahim Bin Hassan	—	—	—
1952-10-16	SC 42641	Wan Teh	—	—	—
1952-10-28	SC 41657	Bujang Bin Hj Sanusi	—	—	—
1952-10-28	SC 41684	Kamis Bin Salleh	—	—	—
1952-11-05	P/Lt 846	J.G. Quick	—	—	killed on CT Ops died from gunshot wounds in Batu Sawah to Kuantan road, Pahang
1952-11-18	SC 43	Hassan Bin Shafie	—	—	—
1952-11-21	SC 41199	Mohamed Bin Saton	—	—	—
1952-11-25	SC/Sgt 739	Tahir Bin Zaini	—	—	—
1952-11-25	SC/Cpl 6685	Ahmad Bin Jais	—	—	—
1952-11-25	SC 6706	Jais Bin Shuib	—	—	—
1952-11-25	SC 7109	Zainal Bin Ayen	—	—	—
1952-11-26	SC 6790	Ahmad Bin Abdul Rahman	—	—	—
1952-12-10	PC 12512	Abdul Rashid	—	—	Killed in CT Operations at Tohallang Chinese Tin Kongsi, Perak
1952-12-14	EPC 3382	Haji Daud Bin Awang	—	—	Killed during the patrol at Bendang Sentang area, near Sintok, Kedah.
1952-12-18	SC 145	Bakar Bin Abdullah	—	—	Killed in Operations at Nami Police Post, Kuala Nerang, Kedah
1952-12-21	P/Lt 533	R.B. Dixon	—	—	Killed in an operation in Kampung Kuala Medang, Pahang
1952-12-21	SC 29161	Noh Bin Mohd Amin	—	—	Killed in an operation in Kampung Kuala Medang, Pahang
1952-12-26	D/SI 177	Kok Ah Lek	—	—	Killed in an operation at Cumming Road, Seremban
1952-12-26	SC 6828	Mohd Hon Bin Kasnan	—	—	Ambushed by communist gunmen en route home as soon as he finished Friday prayers at Masjid Bekok a distance of approximately seven kilometers from police barracks in Bekok River Estates. There was also a police vehicle with a pregnant woman and her child. Upon approaching the road to Bekok River Estates, the vehicle had been hit by the minefield planted by communist forces. The ensuing explosion caused the vehicle to be thrown upwards, resulting in most of the occupants including civilians being killed in the incident.
1952-12-26	SC 7065	Ishak Bin Chandi	—	—	
1952-12-26	SC 7166	Abd Hamid Bin Hj Mohd Pamim	—	—	
1952-12-26	SC 7243	Omar Bin Ali	—	—	
1952-12-26	SC 7290	Abd. Hamid Bin Budin	—	—	
1952-12-26	SC 20158	Aziz Bin Sahom	—	—	
1952-12-31	P/Lt	C.S. Tozer	—	—	Killed in CT Operations at Johore Straits, Johore
1953-01-09	Supt	A.W. Milton	—	—	Died by Natural Causes in Kuala Lumpur
1953-01-15	SC	Chong Kee Woh	35	—	A Staff of the Special Constabulary Retraining School, near Ipoh Aerodrome was ound death with a gunshot wound while on sentry duty.
1953-01-21	ACP G/753	G.D Toulson	—	—	Killed in a helicopter crash in Perak
1953-03-23	PC 949	Ri Bin Alang Ahmad	—	—	Attacked by communist gunmen during the night shift with one Sergeant and one Constable at Bukit Yong Police Station, Pasir Puteh, Kelantan. In the incident at 8.45pm, the bus was stopped near the station and 20 gunmen come out from the bus and suddenly opened fire at the station, resulting in PC 949 being killed and, PC Ismail Bin Abdul Rahman wounded.
1953-03-26	P/Lt 384	D.H. Chapin	—	—	Killed in Action engaging Communist forces near Lasah, Sungai Siput, Perak. Two communist were killed and one was captured on the 27th. Chapin died as he threw himself upon a communist.
1953-04-08	SC 13276	Manap Bin Hj Sait	—	—	—
1953-04-08	SC 13281	Mohamed Khalid Bin Menchick	—	—	—
1953-04-08	SC 20347	Mohamed Rashid Bin Ngah M. Noh	—	—	—
1953-04-08	SC 28521	Ahmad Zuki Bin Puteh Abdullah	—	—	—
1953-04-08	SC 40993	Ismail Bin Meor	—	—	—
1953-04-08	SC 50272	Hassan Bin Ahmad	—	—	—
1953-04-18	PC 18967	Mohamad Tap @ Mohamed Zin Bin Mohamed	—	—	—
1953-04-21	P/Lt 1105	A.B. Wilmot	—	—	Killed on CT Ops in Kulim, Kedah
1953-04-21	P/Lt	A. Bernard	—	—	Killed on CT Ops in Kulim, Kedah
1953-06-26	D/PC 187	Lean Khuan Jin	—	—	—
1953-06-26	SC 39925	Abdul Ghani Bin Hussein	—	—	—
1953-07-20	PC 23986	Awang Bin Yaacob	—	—	—
1953-07-21	Cpl 7312	Abdul Rahman	—	—	—
1953-08-04	SC 22178	R. Maniam	—	—	—
1953-08-04	SC 28293	M. Nabor	—	—	—
1953-08-04	SC 29893	A. Sheikh Mohamed	—	—	—
1953-08-04	SC 40891	Abdul Ghani Bin Abdullah	—	—	—
1953-08-04	SC 50192	S. Mohamed Haniffa	—	—	—
1953-08-23	Cpl 13109	Sidek Bin Suradi	—	—	—
1953-08-31	SC 50854	Hassan Bin Salleh	—	—	—
1953-09-03	PC 12989	Abdul Hadi Bin Mahmud	—	—	—
1953-09-22	PC 26181	Kasbi Bin Keromo	—	—	—
1953-10-01	SC 6425	Abdullah Bin Saibon	—	—	—
1953-10-01	SC 42331	Haron Bin Ramli	—	—	—
1953-10-13	SC 33710	Alang Bin Kulop Pachat	—	—	—
1953-11-02	AP/Insp	G.M. Berry	—	—	Killed in an ambush on the Ulu Remis Estate, Layang-Layang, area of Johore
1953-11-25	AP/Insp	R.W. Saunders	—	—	Killed while on anti-Communist duties Rengam, Johore
1953-11-28	SC 35956	Daud Bin Abdullah	—	—	Killed in Communist Terrorist operation in Besut, Terengganu
1953-12-13	P/Lt 480	A.E. Middleditch	—	—	Killed in an operation during an engagement with a mixed force of communist and orang asli in Sungai Telum, Cameron Highlands, Pahang
1954-01-07	AP/Insp	J.B. Ritson	—	—	Killed in Communist Terrorist operation in Bahau area, Negeri Sembilan
1954-01-08	SC 44107	Ahmad	—	—	Killed in Communist Terrorist operation in Bahau North Sembilan
1954-01-29	SC/Cpl 20752	Abdul Ghani Bin Busu	—	—	Killed in Operations at Bidor, Perak
1954-01-29	SC 25253	Abdul Razak Bin Busu	—	—	Killed in Operations at Bidor, Perak
1954-01-29	SC 28056	Asri Bin Hassan	—	—	Killed in Operations at Bidor, Perak
1954-01-30	PC 7269	Mohd Amin Bin Yusof	—	—	Killed in Operations at Pahang
1954-03-20	Sgt	Sam Weng	—	—	Killed in Communist Terrorist operation in Raub, Pahang
1954-04-03	SC 37295	Poun s/o Andin Froom	—	—	Killed in Operations at Gurun, Kedah
1954-04-23	SC 37679	Kader Bin Mahmud	—	—	Killed in Operations at Nibomg Tibor Province Wellesley
1954-05-05	P/Lt 227	T.A. Charlton, GM	—	—	Killed in Action engaging Communist Terrorist ina one hour fight in the Jungle against many CT's. Charlton died from gunshot wounds in Penggarang District, Johore
1954-05-05	SC 19300	Chin Yong	—	—	Killed in Action engaging Communist Terrorist ina one hour fight in the Jungle against many CT's. Charlton died from gunshot wounds in Penggarang District, Johore
1954-05-05	SC 26446	Teo Hock Sai	—	—	Killed in Action engaging Communist Terrorist ina one hour fight in the Jungle against many CT's. Charlton died from gunshot wounds in Penggarang District, Johore
1954-05-05	SC 39155	Omar Bin Kasbar	—	—	Killed in Action engaging Communist Terrorist ina one hour fight in the Jungle against many CT's. Charlton died from gunshot wounds in Penggarang District, Johore
1954-05-11	P/Lt	E.D. Boxhall	—	—	Killed in an operation
1954-05-20	ACP	L.A Searle	—	—	Killed in action engaging communist gunmen during a night time ambush in Selangor
1954-05-27	SC 13577	Aziz Bin Mat	—	—	Killed in an operation in Ipoh, Perak
1954-05-28	ACP G/515	C.N Godwin	44	Kedah	Killed in an ambush by communist gunmen at 13:00 hrs. Kedah Police Chief, ACP G/515 was driving alone from Mount Jerai Peak, Kedah towards Penang when the gunmens laid the tree across the road to block his path. However, he disembarked from his car to remove the obstacle before he got killed by the gunmen. Three hours later at the same spot, another police vehicle was attacked resulting in the death of EPC 3052, a labourer and a little boy. A Malay woman and two police officers were seriously wounded.
1954-05-28	EPC 3052	Mahmood Bin Frosdin	—	Kedah	
1954-06-14	EPC 4027	Abdullah	—	—	Killed in ambush in 10 miles North on Seremban.
1954-07-02	SC 14243	Sayonan Bin Mahmood	—	—	—
1954-07-23	SC 32585	Saris Bin Saman	—	—	—
1954-07-25	ASP	W.A Gibson	—	—	—
1954-08-12	AP/Insp	B.P. Wills	—	—	Killed in action in Kampar
1954-08-12	SC 50952	Nayon Bin Ishak	—	—	—
1954-09-14	SC 11837	Hassan Bin Alang	—	—	—
1954-10-18	SC 15906	Mohd Yassin Bin Mahirin	—	Johore	The communists attacked and burned out the Chuan Seng Police Station near the Pontian District, resulting in SC 15906, SC 18839, SC 38006 and SC 38055 being killed while seven officers including the station police chief suffered critical wounds.
1954-10-18	SC 18839	Ahmad Bin Hamzah	—	Johore	The communists attacked and burned out the Chuan Seng Police Station near the Pontian District, resulting in SC 15906, SC 18839, SC 38006 and SC 38055 being killed while seven officers including the station police chief suffered critical wounds.
1954-10-18	SC 38006	Abdul Wahan Bin Tamby	—	Johore	The communists attacked and burned out the Chuan Seng Police Station near the Pontian District, resulting in SC 15906, SC 18839, SC 38006 and SC 38055 being killed while seven officers including the station police chief suffered critical wounds.
1954-10-18	SC 38055	Yasin Bin Ahmad	—	Johore	The communists attacked and burned out the Chuan Seng Police Station near the Pontian District, resulting in SC 15906, SC 18839, SC 38006 and SC 38055 being killed while seven officers including the station police chief suffered critical wounds.
1954-11-01	PC 9268	Samion Bin Mohamed	—	—	—
1954-11-01	SC 465	Ismail Bin Hassan	—	—	—
1954-12-02	PC (ST) 13914	V.P Devarajan	—	—	—
1954-12-10	EPC 168	Khalid Bin Mat	—	—	—
1954-12-10	EPC 1068	Foo Fook Kwan	—	—	—
1954-12-10	EPC 1261	Mat Shariff Bin Sutan	—	—	—
1954-12-10	EPC 1471	Sulong Bin Ibrahim	—	—	—
1954-12-10	EPC 2191	Ismail Bin Muin	—	—	—
1954-12-10	EPC 3502	Chang Hock Poh	—	—	—
1955-01-08	Insp I/2458	Appu s/o Veloo	—	—	Killed in Action engaging CT's in Pahang
1955-01-16	P/Lt 1096	C.A.O. Keeffe	—	—	anti-Communist duties in Pahang
1955-01-18	PC (WT) 13972	Thiagarajan	—	—	Killed in Action in Fort Dixon, Pahang
1955-01-20	PC 12375	Mohd Bin Mahmood	—	—	Killed on Operations near Kluang, Johore
1955-01-23	Cpl 7971	Ibrahim Bin Hanafi	—	—	—
1955-01-23	PC 6047	Udin Bin Salleh	—	—	—
1955-01-23	PC 7140	Saad Bin Awang	—	—	—
1955-01-28	D/Sgt 35	Lee Kwang Keong	—	—	—
1955-03-07	Cpl 28113	Wong Ah Nyang	—	—	—
1955-03-11	PC 852	Othman Bin Mohamed	—	—	—
1955-03-19	SC 7889	Mat Hassan Bin Jaffar	—	—	Ambushed by communist gunmen at Kuala Kerai, Kelantan.
1955-03-19	SC 64212	Salleh Bin Mamat	—	—	Ambushed by communist gunmen at Kuala Kerai, Kelantan.
1955-03-19	SC 64221	Tuan Abdullah Bin Tuan Muda	—	—	Ambushed by communist gunmen at Kuala Kerai, Kelantan.
1955-03-19	SC 50479	Ah Lek	—	—	Ambushed by communist gunmen at Kuala Kerai, Kelantan.
1955-03-24	P/Lt	L. Whittingham	—	—	killed in action in Kinta
1955-03-28	PC 23437	Micheal Yoong	—	—	—
1955-04-09	Cpl 3095	Abu Bakar Bin Bahu	—	—	—
1955-04-09	PC 9261	Attan	—	—	—
1955-04-22	PC 14612	Ahmad Bin Yassin	—	—	—
1955-05-31	SC 3286	Bakar Bin Saad	—	—	—
1955-05-31	SC 51607	Zakaria Bin Mat Piah	—	—	—
1955-06-06	SC 46502	Lim Thian Watt	—	—	—
1955-06-09	SC 26654	A. Bakar Bin Rani	—	—	—
1955-07-07	PC 1280	Ishak Bin Din	—	—	—
1955-07-09	SC 33246	Hashim Bin Abu	—	—	—
1955-07-11	SC 10505	Tan Bin Buyong	—	—	—
1955-07-22	SC 25138	Zailani Bin Panjang Ismalan	—	—	—
1955-08-08	SC 23870	Masman	—	—	—
1955-08-08	SC 33835	Atan Bin Mohd Elah	—	—	—
1955-08-10	SC 42570	Abdullah Bin Ismail	—	—	—
1955-08-25	SC 25907	Mohd Yassin Bin Bachik	—	—	—
1955-09-14	PC 22415	Suboh Bin Mohd Yusof	—	—	—
1955-10-23	PC 6047	Udin Bin Salleh	—	—	—
1955-11-02	PC 6509	Khalid Bin Din	—	—	Killed in an operations at Labis, Johore
1955-11-11	PC 9828	Meor Saidin Bin Meor Ahmad	—	—	Killed in an operation at Perak
1955-11-20	PC 25203	Omar Bin Mohd Esa	—	—	—
1955-11-21	PC 27575	Ahmad Saimon	—	—	—
1955-12-26	SC 53980	Aman Bin Ali	—	—	—
1956-01-10	PC 26770	Abdul Ghani	—	—	—
1956-01-15	PC 28669	Bahari Bin Amat	—	—	Killed in an operation at Penang
1956-01-24	P/Lt 399	E.J. Hughes	—	—	Killed while on anti-Communist duties Johore
1956-02-01	SC 23462	Abdul Rahman Bin Hassan	—	—	—
1956-02-01	SC 33826	Othman Bin Hj Abdul Hamid	—	—	—
1956-02-15	SC/Sgt 2948	Abu Bakar Bin Mat Said	—	—	—
1956-02-15	SC/Cpl 9776	Mohd Shariff Bin Hj Abd Salam	—	—	—
1956-02-15	SC 24827	Abdullah Bin Hj Abd Majid	—	—	—
1956-02-15	SC 40384	Abd Samat Bin P. Abdullah	—	—	—
1956-02-15	SC 50542	Zulkifli Bin Yeop Ibrahim	—	—	—
1956-02-15	SC 55901	Naam Bin Abu Hassan	—	—	—
1956-04-06	W/SC 3996	Mary Leong	—	—	Killed in an operation at Kajang, Selangor
1956-04-08	SC 59903	Ahmad Bin Idris	—	—	—
1956-04-17	Cpl 1084	Md Dewa	—	—	—
1956-04-25	PC 28224	Ong Huan Seng	—	—	Killed in an operation at Petaling Jaya, Selangor
1956-05-21	PC 27101	Kassim Bin Jaamat	—	—	—
1956-06-02	SC 7342	Amri Bin Bakri	—	—	—
1956-06-03	SC/Cpl 8677	Ahmad Bin Abdul Ghani	—	—	—
1956-06-03	SC 17521	Ujang Bin Muin	—	—	—
1956-06-03	SC 21321	Tang Sam	—	—	—
1956-06-03	SC 67155	Paiib Jeva	—	—	—
1956-09-08	SC 23742	Bahari Bin Hassan	—	—	—
1956-09-14	PC 29089	Hussain Bin Shariff	—	—	—
1956-10-11	PC 10927	Saad Bin Din	—	—	—
1956-10-19	D/Cpl 891	Wong Wee Choon	—	—	Killed in a Communist Operations at Kulai New Village, Johore
1956-10-25	SC 5554	Baharoin Bin Hitam	—	—	—
1956-10-25	SC 21636	Ishak Bin Ibrahim	—	—	—
1956-10-25	SC 55348	Osman Bin Mat Noor	—	—	—
1956-10-25	SC 55538	Yusof Bin Mat Diah	—	—	—
1956-12-19	PC 5578	Mohd Yusof Bin Mohd Zain	—	—	—
—	SC 24057	Salleh Bin Mohd Akib	—	—	—
—	SC 33042	Tan Eng Soon	—	—	—
—	SC 9962	Mohd Salleh Bin Mohd Akesan	—	—	—
—	SC 11068	William M. Chun	—	—	—
—	SC 24033	Yab Ah Yeo	—	—	—
—	SC 44566	Kamal Bin Uda	—	—	—
—	SC 46408	Tan Cheng Peh	—	—	—
—	SC 5159	Mohd Ross Bin Saidon	—	—	—
—	SC 21693	Ariffin Bin Abdul Ghani	—	—	—
—	SC 24193	Mohd Isa Bin Laziz	—	—	—
—	SC 19377	Basad Bin Ahmad	—	—	—
—	SC 51491	Abu Bakar Bin Hussein	—	—	—
—	SC 18470	Sarjam Singh	—	—	—
—	SC 18471	Ismail Bin Yusof	—	—	—
—	SC 11520	Awang Bin Khamis	—	—	—
—	SC 18593	Hassan Bin Abdullah	—	—	—
—	SC/Cpl 18207	Man Bin Senawi	—	—	—
—	SC 18573	Lazim Bin Hussein	—	—	—
—	SC 11524	Bakar Bin Ali	—	—	—
—	SC 30789	Din	—	—	—
—	SC 11466	Ariffin Bin Hj. Salleh	—	—	—
—	SC 41734	Ahmad Bin Jusoh	—	—	—
—	SC 42027	Wan Teh Bin Darus	—	—	—
—	SC 31083	Din Bin Khamis	—	—	—
—	SC 28985	Mohd Noor Bin Ismail	—	—	—
—	SC 7889	Abdul Rahman Bin Ja'afar	—	—	—
—	SC 29606	Mohamed	—	—	—
—	SC 5604	Lazim Bin Piee	—	—	—
—	SC 21647	Sabtu Bin Mahat	—	—	—
—	SC 22764	Rahim Bin Abdul Samad	—	—	—
—	SC 15932	Ahmad Bin Sada	—	—	—
—	SC 15926	Hamid Bin Ahad	—	—	—
—	SC 29590	Ahmad Bin Abd. Ghani	—	—	—
—	SC 24290	Ja'afar Bin Abdullah	—	—	—
—	SC 21612	Ma'anor Bin Bachik	—	—	—
—	SC 36584	Baharudin Bin Konteng	—	—	—
—	SC 32520	Hassan Bin Cheivan	—	—	—
—	SC 17522	Abdul Rahman	—	—	—
—	SC 22824	Osman Bin Mat	—	—	—
1957-03-12	PC 28385	Abd Rahman Bin abd Wahab	—	—	—
1957-06-13	DSP	J. Purdy	—	—	Died of Natural Causes in Johore Bahru
1957-10-01	PC 25255	Thye Nyong Yaw	—	—	—
1957-12-11	PC 11121	Hussain Bin Dahari	—	—	—
1957-12-16	P/Lt	G.E.T. Southey	—	—	Killed in action in Kuala Lumpur
1958-01-05	Cpl 2937	Othman Bin Sulaiman	—	—	—
1958-07-13	PC 7173	Wong Chin Thiam	—	—	Killed in an operation
1958-07-19	PC 9652	Che Wan	—	—	—
1959-03-17	Sgt 1468	Mohd Shah Bin Nabi Bakhsh	—	—	—
1959-03-17	PC 23831	Zainal Abidin Bin Talib	—	—	—
1959-03-18	PC 615	Murad Bin Abdullah	—	—	—
1959-04-01	P/Lt	J. Stead	—	—	Die in Natural Causes in Malacca
1959-08-15	Cpl 491	Mohamed Nor Bin Hamid	—	—	—

== 1960s ==
Date	Rank/no	Name	Age	Division/unit	Circumstance
1960-10-21	PC	Yusoff bin Awang	30	PFF	Hit by falling tree.
1961-10-30	PC	Lee Hock Lay	30	PFF	Killed in traffic accident.
1964-02-21	PC 12259	Jamaluddin Bin Said	—	PFF	Ambushed by Indonesian guerillas at an observation post at Bau, Kuching, Sarawak, during the Indonesia–Malaysia confrontation.
1964-02-21	PC 28240	Abdul Majid Bin Rahim	—	PFF	Ambushed by Indonesian guerillas at an observation post at Bau, Kuching, Sarawak, during the Indonesia–Malaysia confrontation.
1964-10-22	PC 26004	Bachik Bin Botok	—	PFF	Accidentally shot himself while on patrol duty in the Fort Legap area in deep jungle near Sungai Siput.
1965-06-19	PC	Ja'afar Bin Abdul Raof	31	PFF	Died in Heart Attack.
1966-03-07	PC 31961	Darus Bin Mahmud	—	PPF	Killed in an attack during an operation in Serian, Sarawak and he get kill two Indonesian-Sarawak communist with Bren LMG, he received Pingat Jasa Perkasa Persekutuan in June 1966.
1966-08-07	D/Cpl 327	Choo Chan	—	—	—
1966-08-07	D/Cpl 355	Lim Tek Piat	—	—	—
1966-08-07	PC 27791	Low Kek Boon	—	—	—
1968-06-17	PC 1479	Abdullah Bin Muhammad	—	PFF	Killed in an ambush during an operation in Bukit Berapit, Perak, as a result of the Communist insurgency in Malaysia (1968–89).
1968-06-17	PC 1509	Loh Ah Chu	—	PFF	Killed in an ambush during an operation in Bukit Berapit, Perak, as a result of the Communist insurgency in Malaysia (1968–89).
1968-06-17	PC 8365	Jalil Bin Bachik	—	PFF	Killed in an ambush during an operation in Bukit Berapit, Perak, as a result of the Communist insurgency in Malaysia (1968–89).
1968-06-17	PC 11401	Ismail Bin Mat Sidi	—	PFF	Killed in an ambush during an operation in Bukit Berapit, Perak, as a result of the Communist insurgency in Malaysia (1968–89).
1968-06-17	PC 14892	Nizan Bin Mohd Adam	—	PFF	Killed in an ambush during an operation in Bukit Berapit, Perak, as a result of the Communist insurgency in Malaysia (1968–89).
1968-06-17	PC 19839	Abdul Gahani Bin Mohd	—	PFF	Killed in an ambush during an operation in Bukit Berapit, Perak, as a result of the Communist insurgency in Malaysia (1968–89).
1968-06-17	PC 20239	Abdul Hamid Bin Bakar	—	PFF	Killed in an ambush during an operation in Bukit Berapit, Perak, as a result of the Communist insurgency in Malaysia (1968–89).
1968-06-17	PC 23086	Chan Eng Teck	—	PFF	Killed in an ambush during an operation in Bukit Berapit, Perak, as a result of the Communist insurgency in Malaysia (1968–89).
1968-06-17	PC 24008	Mustapha Bin Hussein	—	PFF	Killed in an ambush during an operation in Bukit Berapit, Perak, as a result of the Communist insurgency in Malaysia (1968–89).
1968-06-17	PC 24827	Mohamad Bin Othman	—	PFF	Killed in an ambush during an operation in Bukit Berapit, Perak, as a result of the Communist insurgency in Malaysia (1968–89).
1968-06-17	PC 25200	Hashim Bin Ismail	—	PFF	Killed in an ambush during an operation in Bukit Berapit, Perak, as a result of the Communist insurgency in Malaysia (1968–89).
1968-06-17	PC 25700	Abdullah Bin Ismail	—	PFF	Killed in an ambush during an operation in Bukit Berapit, Perak, as a result of the Communist insurgency in Malaysia (1968–89).
1968-06-17	PC 30449	Ang Lock Say	—	PFF	Killed in an ambush during an operation in Bukit Berapit, Perak, as a result of the Communist insurgency in Malaysia (1968–89).
1968-06-17	PC 30758	Mohd Salleh Bin Abidin	—	PFF	Killed in an ambush during an operation in Bukit Berapit, Perak, as a result of the Communist insurgency in Malaysia (1968–89).
1968-06-17	PC 30833	Ismail Bin Amir	—	PFF	Killed in an ambush during an operation in Bukit Berapit, Perak, as a result of the Communist insurgency in Malaysia (1968–89).
1968-06-17	PC 40281	Abdul Ghani Bin Daud	—	PFF	Killed in an ambush during an operation in Bukit Berapit, Perak, as a result of the Communist insurgency in Malaysia (1968–89).
1966-08-07	Insp I/2828	S.C. Samy	—	SB	Killed in police operation of hunting down Communist Terrorist in Southern Thailand.
1966-08-07	Insp I/1531	Robert Lee Choon Fook	—	—	Killed in police operation of hunting down Communist Terrorist in Southern Thailand.
1968-08-16	PC 29987	Abu Bakar Bin Ngah Wahab	—	PFF	PC 29987 had participated in an operation that was launched by the Police Field Force to storm a communist fort at Betong, Southern Thailand. In the ensuing clash, PC 29987 was killed in the operation.
1968-08-26	PC 7595	Jaafar Bin Haji Abdul Rahman	—	—	—

== 1970s ==
Date	Rank/no	Name	Age	Division/unit	Circumstance
1970-02-10	PC 46737	Abd Jabar bin Othman	—	PFF	Killed in an ambush during Operation Sawadee Salam at the Malaysia-Thailand border
1970-09-19	PC	Hamzah bin Kassim	20	PFF	Accidentally shot in his camp at Nami.
1971-01-08	PC 10126	Shamsuddin Bin Pileh	—	—	—
1971-02-16	PC 52741	Mat Hassan Bin Mat Adam	—	—	—
1971-02-16	PC 23978	Daud Bin Samad	—	—	—
1971-02-18	PC 51553	Hanafi Bin Abdullah	—	—	—
1971-03-14	Sgt 155	Mat Hassan Bin Mat Adam	—	Marine	—
1971-03-14	MPC 234	Yahya Bin Yunus	—	Marine	—
1971-03-14	MPC 469	Ismail Bin Hamzah	—	Marine	—
1971-03-14	MPC 554	Tahir Bin Dolah	—	Marine	—
1971-04-30	D/Cpl 1351	Yeap Sean Hua	—	Setapak	At about 12:50 p.m., Cpl 1351 was shot and killed on the spot while on duty to apprehend an armed and violent Chinese-youth criminal at Setapak town, Kuala Lumpur. The gunfire which killed Cpl 1351 was also heard by PC 30279 Fong Thean Kit while he finished his duty and was shopping near the incident. PC 30279 chased and managed to arrest the criminal. Both PC 30279 and late Cpl 1351 were awarded the Seri Pahlawan Gagah Perkasa.
1971-05-26	PC 16874	Bujang @ Malik Bin Sintal	—	PFF	Killed during Operation Paradom in Sibu, Sarawak
1971-05-26	PC 53243	Masri Bin Basiran	—	—	—
1971-05-26	PC 53261	Abdul Kadir Bin Baharin	—	—	—
1971-06-14	PC 30229	Kee Cheng Hock	—	—	—
1971-07-19	PC 50053	Faridon Bin Abdul Ghani	—	PFF	Killed during Operation Selamat Sawadi Salam in Thailand
1971-07-24	PC 51124	Mohd Nadran Bin Mohd Yudin	—	—	
1971-08-08	PC 51183	Rani Bin Harun	—	PFF	Killed in ambush during Operation Ngayau at Sarawak
1971-08-11	Cpl 27169	Ibrahim Bin Saad	—	—	Ambushed in Kampung Charok, Chupak, Padang Serai, Kedah
1971-08-11	PC 31632	Yahya Bin Din	—	—	Ambushed in Kampung Charok, Chupak, Padang Serai, Kedah
1971-08-11	PC 40469	Yahya Bin Abu Bakar	—	—	Ambushed in Kampung Charok, Chupak, Padang Serai, Kedah
1971-08-11	PC 50718	Jainuri Bin Juraie	—	—	Ambushed in Kampung Charok, Chupak, Padang Serai, Kedah
1971-08-11	PC 52501	Mohd Noor Bin Abdullah	—	—	Ambushed in Kampung Charok, Chupak, Padang Serai, Kedah
1971-08-23	PC 31006	Mohd Sidek Bin Ahmad	—	—	—
1971-08-31	PC 51130	Osman Bin Abu	—	—	—
1971-09-08	PC 29964	Jurit bin Kida	—	PFF	Killed in ambush during Operation Ngayau at Sarawak
1971-11-07	PC 52333	Razali Bin Puteh	—	PFF	Killed in ambush during Operation Ngayau at Sarawak
1972-06-16	Sgt 27908	Ghazali Bin Ahmad	—	—	—
1972-06-16	PC 50255	Mohamad Bin Damaman	—	—	—
1972-06-16	PC 50271	Maizi Bin Ariff Shah	—	—	—
1972-06-16	PC 51995	Saonan Bin Dollah	—	—	—
1972-07-10	PC 49986	Raut bin Ismail	—	PFF	Killed in Operation Ukur at Thailand border
1972-12-01	Cpl 950	Joseph E. Rodrigues	—	—	—
1972-12-01	Cpl 13267	Abdul Hamid Bin Othman	—	—	—
1973-02-07	PC 23776	Abdul Ghani Bin Hassan	—	—	—
1973-02-08	PC 51458	Yahya bin Hassan	—	PFF	Killed in Operation Amok in Sawah Raja, Negeri Sembilan
1973-02-20	PC 51437	Roslan Bin Yahaya	—	PFF	Killed in Operation Amok in Sawah Raja, Negeri Sembilan
1973-05-14	PC 5397	Mohd Yusoff Bin Jamlus	—	PFF	Drowned during Operation Ngayau at Sarawak
1973-05-14	PC 49769	Nordin Bin Salleh	—	PFF	Drowned during Operation Ngayau at Sarawak
1973-05-14	PC 49833	Abdul Halim Bin Abdul Wahab	—	PFF	Drowned during Operation Ngayau at Sarawak
1973-06-20	PC 29607	Ooi Khoon Tat	—	—	—
1973-06-22	PC 25676	Hashim Bin Akid	—	—	—
1973-07-12	C/Insp I/1952	Chin Chin Kooi	—	SB	At 09.00p.m, a notorious criminal broke in his house, C/Insp I/1952 was shot point blank by two pistols. Before being killed he returned fire at the criminals. The late C/Insp. Chin had served in the police force for 21 years. He was awarded the Seri Pahlawan Gagah Perkasa for his courage.
1973-07-26	Sgt 26081	Lee Han Cheong	—	PFF	At 11:00 a.m. Eleven Police Field Force (PFF) members led by Sgt 26081 in a joint effort program in Bidok area for villager relocation who escaped from the communist forces, Sgt 26081 was urinating in the bush near the area. Suddenly, Sgt 26081 was shot at point blank range by Communist forces who were hiding in the bush, believed to be while scouting the area. He was critically wounded with gunshot wounds in the forehead dying on the spot.
1973-09-05	Sgt 7863	Haji Omar Bin Hashim	52	—	Shot dead by a man held a .303 rifle in Gegangsa Police Station at 6:30 a.m.
1973-10-22	D/Sgt 332	Chong Kek Oh	54	SB	Shot dead by communist gunmen at Sungai Siput, Perak.
1973-12-14	Cpl 24320	Abdul Rahman Bin Abu	—	—	—
1973-12-14	PC 12253	Osman Bin Lat	—	—	—
1973-12-15	PC 4673	Mansur Bin Bidon	—	—	—
1974-01-03	D/PC 30864	Lau See Kaw	35	SB	Shot dead by communist gunmen at Malim Nawar, Perak.
1974-01-10	D/PC 1443	Othman Bin Ahmad	—	CID	D/PC 1443 and his patrolman were ambushed by six criminals at sugar cane plantation in Cupping, Perlis. He fought and killed one of the criminals. He was awarded the Seri Pahlawan Gagah Perkasa.
1974-01-16	PC 52124	Daud Bin Ahmad	—	—	—
1974-01-19	PC 11193	Ishak Bin Said	—	—	—
1974-01-22	Insp I/5271	Mohd Zaki Bin Awang	—	—	—
1974-03-07	PC 31017	Abdul Rahman Bin Sulong	—	—	—
1974-03-31	PC 7944	Cheah Kwo Sam	—	—	—
1974-04-20	D/Sgt 703	Lee Yoon Chin	49	SB	Shot dead by communist gunmen at Malacca.
1974-04-24	D/PC 24526	Ong Soon Chua	—	SB	Shot dead by communist gunmen at Chemor, Perak.
1974-06-07	IGP G/484	Tan Sri Abdul Rahman Bin Hashim	49	Bukit Aman	Killed by communist forces between Mountbatten Street (now Jalan Tun Perak) and Weld Street (now Jalan Raja Chulan), Kuala Lumpur and he died on the spot. On June 8, 1974, he was given a police heroes funeral and was laid to rest at Jalan Ampang Muslim Cemetery, Kuala Lumpur.
1974-07-07	PC 40978	Mohd Salleh Bin Hawari	—	—	—
1975-02-26	Sgt 445	Song Kim Tong	—	—	—
1975-03-01	PC 46522	Ramli Bin Mohd Zain	28	—	Shot dead by five men when PC 46522 arrived at the front door of Gallery Jewelry Gold Shop, Jalan 21/12 Taman Sea at 8:15pm.
1975-03-27	PC 30467	Low Sing Yong	—	—	—
1975-03-29	PC 24286	Ahmad Bin Busu	—	—	—
1975-04-06	ASP G/4741	Mohd Johny Bin Mustapha	—	PFF	The troops of Police Field Force led by an officer, ASP Mohd Johny was ambushed by the PARAKU Communist group at the black pepper plantation near the Setabau River, Sibu, Sarawak. Although ASP Mohd Johny was injured severely by gunfire, he forbade PC 1642 to nurse him and was told to leave him and move forward and attack the enemy. PC 1642 obeyed his orders and move forward. During the ambush, two officers were downed and the communist retreated into the jungle. PC 1642 was awarded the Seri Pahlawan Gagah Perkasa for his courageousness.
1975-04-06	PC 1642	Nuing s/o Saling	—	PFF	
1975-04-19	D/PC 41710	Foo Kek Wee	35	SB	Shot dead by 4 young men who believe in underground communist while he was walking home from work at about 8:45 pm when the incident happened.
1975-05-18	D/PC	Leong Ming Kwong	49	SB	Shot dead by two communist gunmen at Langkap, near Teluk Anson, Perak.
1975-05-19	D/Sgt 65	Tong Wing Poh	42	SB	Shot dead in front his family while on eat in open restaurant in Jalan Alor near Jalan Bukit Bintang.
1975-05-20	D/PC 30058	Ong Teng Chin	40	SB	Shot dead by communist gunmen at Ipoh, Perak.
1975-06-18	PC 41042	Saparman Bin Nasron	—	PFF	Killed by a communist ambush during Operation Ukur in Sadau, Thailand. A platoon of Jungle Squad from the Police Field Force together with their Thai counterpart escorted a topography team from the National Mapping Agency to measure the Malaysia-Thailand border. The ambush killed 15 people, including eight from the Jungle Squad, three from National Mapping Agency, and four from Royal Thai Police.
1975-06-18	PC 46768	Mohd Nor Bin Tumin	—	PFF	Killed by a communist ambush during Operation Ukur in Sadau, Thailand. A platoon of Jungle Squad from the Police Field Force together with their Thai counterpart escorted a topography team from the National Mapping Agency to measure the Malaysia-Thailand border. The ambush killed 15 people, including eight from the Jungle Squad, three from National Mapping Agency, and four from Royal Thai Police.
1975-06-18	PC 46787	Madiun Bin Abdul Wahab	—	PFF	Killed by a communist ambush during Operation Ukur in Sadau, Thailand. A platoon of Jungle Squad from the Police Field Force together with their Thai counterpart escorted a topography team from the National Mapping Agency to measure the Malaysia-Thailand border. The ambush killed 15 people, including eight from the Jungle Squad, three from National Mapping Agency, and four from Royal Thai Police.
1975-06-18	PC 46794	Alizar Bin Sarunan	—	PFF	Killed by a communist ambush during Operation Ukur in Sadau, Thailand. A platoon of Jungle Squad from the Police Field Force together with their Thai counterpart escorted a topography team from the National Mapping Agency to measure the Malaysia-Thailand border. The ambush killed 15 people, including eight from the Jungle Squad, three from National Mapping Agency, and four from Royal Thai Police.
1975-06-18	PC 49316	Sai an Bin Salimin	—	PFF	Killed by a communist ambush during Operation Ukur in Sadau, Thailand. A platoon of Jungle Squad from the Police Field Force together with their Thai counterpart escorted a topography team from the National Mapping Agency to measure the Malaysia-Thailand border. The ambush killed 15 people, including eight from the Jungle Squad, three from National Mapping Agency, and four from Royal Thai Police.
1975-06-18	PC 49386	Ma'an Bin Ahmad Siraj	—	PFF	Killed by a communist ambush during Operation Ukur in Sadau, Thailand. A platoon of Jungle Squad from the Police Field Force together with their Thai counterpart escorted a topography team from the National Mapping Agency to measure the Malaysia-Thailand border. The ambush killed 15 people, including eight from the Jungle Squad, three from National Mapping Agency, and four from Royal Thai Police.
1975-06-18	PC 53415	Abu Nordin Bin Ibrahim	—	PFF	Killed by a communist ambush during Operation Ukur in Sadau, Thailand. A platoon of Jungle Squad from the Police Field Force together with their Thai counterpart escorted a topography team from the National Mapping Agency to measure the Malaysia-Thailand border. The ambush killed 15 people, including eight from the Jungle Squad, three from National Mapping Agency, and four from Royal Thai Police.
1975-06-18	PC 55688	Mohd Zahid Bin Jumangat	—	PFF	Killed by a communist ambush during Operation Ukur in Sadau, Thailand. A platoon of Jungle Squad from the Police Field Force together with their Thai counterpart escorted a topography team from the National Mapping Agency to measure the Malaysia-Thailand border. The ambush killed 15 people, including eight from the Jungle Squad, three from National Mapping Agency, and four from Royal Thai Police.
1975-07-21	PC 23004	Lim Hee Wey	—	—	—
1975-07-21	PC 62350	Aban s/o Long	—	—	—
1975-08-03	ASP	Zamri Bin Ishak	—	PFF	ASP Zamri Ishak head a team to track the communist guerrilla in operation Bamboo on 3 August 1975. In the battle, Zamri was critically wounded when a booby trap exploded and hit his side foot. A backup squad gave him first aid, however, he died on the way to the hospital several hours later.
1975-08-14	Insp I/5084	Mohd Yusof Bin Talib	—	PFF	Killed in ambush during Operation Sawadee
1975-08-14	PC 55826	Mohd Yassin bin Salleh	—	PFF	Killed in ambush during Operation Sawadee
1975-08-28	EPC 5244	Mat Alias Bin Nik Daud	—	Perak	Four officers from Grik District Police Headquarters deployed to send food rations to VAT-69 unit at Temenggor Control Post. En route with the boat, they were suddenly ambushed and killed by communist forces. All bodies of the officers were tortured before they were slain and seized the service shotguns from the officers before retreating into the jungle.
1975-08-28	EPC 5247	Yeop Bin Omar	—	Perak	Four officers from Grik District Police Headquarters deployed to send food rations to VAT-69 unit at Temenggor Control Post. En route with the boat, they were suddenly ambushed and killed by communist forces. All bodies of the officers were tortured before they were slain and seized the service shotguns from the officers before retreating into the jungle.
1975-08-28	EPC 5261	Sharif Bin Yaakob	—	Perak	Four officers from Grik District Police Headquarters deployed to send food rations to VAT-69 unit at Temenggor Control Post. En route with the boat, they were suddenly ambushed and killed by communist forces. All bodies of the officers were tortured before they were slain and seized the service shotguns from the officers before retreating into the jungle.
1975-08-28	EPC 5272	Wan Marzuki Bin Wan Hussein	—	Perak	Four officers from Grik District Police Headquarters deployed to send food rations to VAT-69 unit at Temenggor Control Post. En route with the boat, they were suddenly ambushed and killed by communist forces. All bodies of the officers were tortured before they were slain and seized the service shotguns from the officers before retreating into the jungle.
1975-09-03	PC 46955	Mohd Yusof Bin Abd Rahman	—	PFF	Killed in a bombing incident where communist guerrillas bombed a Central Police Field Force Brigade Headquarters (PPH) at the Pekeliling Street (now Tun Razak Street) which resulting in the killing of PC 46955 and PC 49614 and injuring 10 other officers.
1975-09-03	PC 49614	Abd Hamid Bin Muhamad	—	PFF	Killed in a bombing incident where communist guerrillas bombed a Central Police Field Force Brigade Headquarters (PPH) at the Pekeliling Street (now Tun Razak Street) which resulting in the killing of PC 46955 and PC 49614 and injuring 10 other officers.
1975-09-04	Insp I/3427	Mohd Zabri Bin Abdul Hamid	38	VAT-69	Killed when he stepped on a booby-trap which was set up by communist forces while taking two wounded members to an extraction point after an operation to intercept and hunt down communists forces who were responsible in the killing of four Extra Police Constables at Grik who were sent to the hospital. His right leg was broken and suffered serious wounds which caused him to lose lots of blood. He was posthumously promoted to ASP for his bravery and awarded the Seri Pahlawan Gagah Perkasa in the year 2014.
1975-11-14	DCP G/4218	Dato' Khoo Chong Kong	50	Perak	DCP G/4218 was returning to headquarters after having lunch when two gunmen from the 1st Mobile Squad of the Malayan Communist Party on a motorcycle, shot him at point-blank range at a line of traffic lights junction between Fair Park and Anderson Road in Ipoh, Perak. His driver, PC 5135 returned and fired at his chief's assassins, but he failed when he was also shot dead by them on both sides of his chest and in his head. The gunmen escaped but were apprehended later before they were hanged to death for the murder of the officers. DCP G/4218 was given a promotion posthumously and was ceremoniously cremated with full police honours and awarded the titles of Tan Sri while PC 5135 was given a rare field promotion to a rank of Sergeant for his courageously.
1975-11-14	PC 5135	Yeong Peng Chong	—	Perak	
1975-11-18	Sgt 11783	Ismail Bin Yahaya	—	—	—
1975-11-18	Sgt 55924	Omar Bin Ahmad	—	—	—
1975-11-21	Sgt 25433	Loh Kim Fong	42	SB	Killed by two gunmen while he was driving home.
1975-12-21	PC 46462	Ahmad Bin Mohd Ali	—	—	—
1976-01-20	PC 40412	Abdul Wahid Bin Abdul Aziz	35	—	Shot dead during an attempted hold-up at a construction site in Serdang at 3 p.m.
1976-02-06	Sgt 9997	Mohd Shariff Bin Bidin	—	—	—
1976-05-10	PC 5358	Rani Bin Abdul Ghani	—	—	Ambushed by communist insurgents at Simpang Pertang Police Station.
1976-06-03	Cpl 31507	Ridzewan Bin Shaadan	—	PFF	At 12:45 pm during the intake of 35 police constable undergoing the final phase of training 'Final Ops'. During the second uphill section which is known as Bukit Keramat Pulai, Cpl 31507 thought that the area may be dangerous because the doubt is based on Chinese writing found on broken hedges and wood branches. To ensure the safety situation, Cpl 31507 ordered the three members, TPC 63897, TPC 63899, and TPC 64010 go to inspect the location. Suddenly, they overheard sounds of gunfire, at the same time all the intake pulled back upon hearing the TPC 63897, TPC 63899, and TPC 64010 shout strongly the word "communist". Hearing the scream, Cpl 31507 got up immediately to look but he was shot in the side of his eye. The situation becomes chaotic when they realize they were ambushed by communists from the uphill angl causing their team to split up. In the situation, TPC 60899 Mohamad Salim gave an order to the platoon to take positions and to return enemy fire. Shortly after, the platoon successfully captured the communist stronghold which has been modified like a house after the communists retreat when receiving violent opposition from the trainees. After a quiescent state, TPC 63897, TPC 63899, and TPC 64010 were also killed about 15 metres from communist control post the shooting incident held on for an hour. On extraordinary courage, TPC 60899 and TPC Mohammadthis Noh Hashim were awarded Panglima Gagah Berani one year later.
1976-06-03	TPC 63897	Yusoff Bin Ismail	—	PFF	
1976-06-03	TPC 63899	Zainal Bin Pandak Ahmad	—	PFF	
1976-06-03	TPC 64010	Jaafar Bin Hj. Mansor	—	PFF	
1976-07-02	PC 31003	Abdul Kadir Bin Ahmat	—	—	—
1976-08-25	Insp I/5744	Mat Zin Bin Mat Yassin	—	SB	On 23 August at 10:00 p.m. in Ipoh, Inspector Mat Zin headed and succeeded in capturing four communist agents and seizing three guns, three hand grenades, and other explosives. Two days later at 1:20 p.m., in the area of Pasir Pinji, Ipoh, he headed three police officers in carrying a round-up of communist agents. At that precise moment, the Communist agent took out his gun and fired at Insp I/5744 in the stomach, resulting in his death. The Communist agent was also shot dead. Inspector Mat Zin was awarded the Panglima Gagah Berani.
1976-08-27	D/Cpl 28648	Gan Cheng Tack	41	SB	Killed in Tampoi, Johor by two communist insurgents.
1976-09-06	PC 63341	Ghazali Bin Sulong	—	—	—
1976-09-08	PC 63272	Mohd Noor Bin Leman	22	—	Accidentally shot dead by his colleague while his colleague inspect the service pistol.
1976-09-15	PC 41804	Ngatiman Bin Sartan	31	Traffic Police	Shot by two armed youths as he approached the intersection of Jalan Pekeliling/Jalan Kia Peng while he was on patrol duty.
1977-01-31	Sgt 4054	Jemat s/o Ningan	—	—	—
1977-03-08	PC 4007	Abdul Rashid Bin Hj Mohamad Yatim	—	—	—
1977-03-24	D/PC 55512	Mohd Yatim Bin Salleh	27	CID	Both were shot dead in police operation.
1977-03-24	PC (V) 8018	Abdul Kahar Bin Nordin	30	PVR	Both were shot dead in police operation.
1977-06-19	DSP G/1701	M. Thiagarajan	45	SB	Killed in police operation in Kampung Baru Ampang.
1977-10-28	PC 24848	Alias Bin Mohd Rashid	—	—	—
1977-10-28	EPC 6150	Damaraju s/o Chinna Govindan	—	—	—
1978-01-05	PC 59511	Mohd Noor Bin Hashim	—	PFF	Killed in food store located in Sungai Ruan, Pahang by Communist Terrorist.
1978-01-05	PC 64580	Sharmuganithan	—	PFF	Killed in food store located in Sungai Ruan, Pahang by Communist Terrorist.
1978-02-25	PC 13443	Hussein Bin Ali	—	Mobile Patrol Vehicle	Ambushed by the Malayan Peoples Liberation Army at Seremban, Negeri Sembilan.
1978-05-06	Sgt	Abdul Jalil Bin Mahadi	40	—	Shot dead by unknown person near Kampung Tiong.
1978-05-06	Cpl	Abdul Latif Bin Ibrahim	42	—	Shot dead by unknown person near Kampung Tiong.
1978-06-17	Insp I/6702	Mohamed Rashid Bin Amran	25	PFF	Killed in a Communist operation at Kroh, Ulu Perak
1978-06-17	Cpl 14711	Zakaria Bin Buntal	—	PFF	Killed in a Communist operation at Kroh, Ulu Perak
1978-06-17	PC 46866	Mohd Noor Bin Yassin	—	PFF	Killed in a Communist operation at Kroh, Ulu Perak
1978-06-17	PC 52925	Husrin Bin Abu Shah	—	PFF	Killed in a Communist operation at Kroh, Ulu Perak
1978-06-17	PC 57343	Yusof Bin Ahmad	—	PFF	Killed in a Communist operation at Kroh, Ulu Perak
1978-06-27	PC 68153	Tan Eng Tai	—	—	—
1978-07-24	PC 69713	Wong Ching Hua	—	—	—
1978-08-29	PC 62209	Mandi s/o Itam Tambo	—	VAT-69	Killed during Operation Hentam Sedar 4 in Kulim, Kedah
1978-10-09	PC 62195	Bah Tradel s/o Din	—	VAT-69	Killed during Operation Setia 21/78 in Tapah, Bidor
1979-06-27	PC 68153	Mohamed Rashid Bin Amran	—	—	—
1979-07-11	PC 56516	Mokhtar Bin Hashim	—	—	—
1979-09-16	PC 59367	Ahmad Bin Yassin	—	PFF	Killed during Operation Ulu Rening in Kuala Kubu Bharu, Selangor

== 1980s ==
Date	Rank/no	Name	Age	Division/unit	Circumstance
1980-01-18	PC 56921	Zainon Bin Zain	—	—	—
1980-01-28	PC 71933	Yub Bin Gedu	—	VAT 69	Killed during Operation Setia 2/80 at Tanah Hitam, Chemor, Perak.
1980-06-09	Insp I/8294	Gunasegaran Naidu s/o Ratinum	—	Senoi Praaq	Killed during Operation Bamboo at Ulu Kelantan. He was awarded the Panglima Gagah Berani.
1980-06-12	PC 55122	Ku Ching Hoo s/o Ku Ah	—	—	—
1980-08-31	PC 72218	Arzimi bin Maarof	—	PFF	Killed during Operation Ukur at the Malaysian-Thai border
1981-06-16	PC 41863	Abdul Razak Bin Dahlan	—	—	—
1981-11-12	PC 4859	Jidin Bin Jalil	—	—	—
1982-01-10	ASP G/3641	Charoen s/o Daam	—	—	—
1982-03-02	PC 69641	Yahya Bin Hassan	—	—	—
1982-04-29	PC 68258	Woo Kim Peng	—	—	—
1983-02-05	PC 62538	Bah Osi s/o Chandan	—	—	—
1983-04-10	PC 65984	Ooi Ing Sung	—	—	—
1983-05-05	PC 49433	Baharuddin Bin Baki	—	—	—
1983-06-09	Sgt 7417	Ooi Kun Teck	—	—	—
1983-07-03	PC 92592	Abdul Razak Bin Ishak	—	—	—
1983-07-05	D/PC 96729	Leong An Suan	—	—	Shot dead by Cheng Song Xi, a robber who was active in the 1980s, when he was robbing a Coffee shop in Petaling Jaya
1983-11-01	PC 87805	Roslan Bin Abdul Ghani	23	—	shot dead in an attempted robbery at the Overseas Union Bank, PC 87805 has been awarded the Conspicuous Gallantry Medal posthumously from the governor of Penang.
1984-02-06	PC 101758	Dahlan Bin Mat Ali	—	—	—
1984-02-08	PC 69736	Mohamad Yassin Bin Ismail	—	—	Shot dead by a Singaporean criminal, named Chua Chap Seng or known as Jimmy Chua. After his death, the police hunted down and arrested him at Khoo Teik Eee Street. Before Jimmy was detained at Pudu Prison he and five more prisoners took two doctors as their hostages.
1984-02-24	PC 47559	Johari Bin Zakaria	—	—	—
1984-09-09	PC 67674	Zainuddin Bin Hassan	—	VAT 69	A task force units from VAT 69 police Commandos during Operation Pancing/Operation Tuah, received the order to assist the Police Field Force which was trapped in an ambushed by communist guerillas at the Ulu Kinta jungle. PC 67574 who was a tracker and in the frontline with his teammates, when one female communist fired at him in the chest, resulting in his death.
1984-09-09	Cpl 52260	Mansor Bin Zainuddin	—	VAT 69	A task force units from VAT 69 police Commandos during Operation Pancing/Operation Tuah, received the order to assist the Police Field Force which was trapped in an ambushed by communist guerillas at the Ulu Kinta jungle. PC 67574 who was a tracker and in the frontline with his teammates, when one female communist fired at him in the chest, resulting in his death.
1985-04-08	Cpl 24933	Abdul Rahman Bin Hj Zakaria	—	—	—
1985-06-01	ASP G/3691	Subramaniam s/o Sittampalam	49	—	Shot dead in robbery incident in Taman Melaka Jaya.
1985-11-09	Insp I/8042	Azmi Bin Hamzah	—	PFF	A task force of 200 policemen under orders from the Acting Prime Minister and Home Minister Musa Hitam, laid siege to village houses in Memali, Kedah. The houses were occupied by an Islamic sect of about 400 people led by Ibrahim Mahmud a.k.a. Ibrahim Libya. In the storming of the complex, Inspector 8042, Sgt 24195, PC 46940, and PC 63302 were shot by some of the villagers using shotguns that were supplied by Ikatan Relawan Rakyat to guard the village in a case of threat by the Communist Party of Malaya.
1985-11-09	Sgt 24195	Abd Rahman Bin Md Noor	—	FRU	
1985-11-09	PC 46940	Jaafar Bin Sain	—	FRU	
1985-11-09	PC 63302	Md Suli Bin Othman	—	FRU	
1985-12-21	PC 109046	Jifri Joseph	—	—	—
1986-04-15	PC 48416	Ong Soon Chin @ Swee Ching	—	—	—
1986-04-16	PC 78653	Mandoh s/o Jimbun	—	—	—
1987-01-29	Insp I/9080	Wan Zain Bin Tuanku Hj Fauzi	—	—	—
1987-04-20	PC 49562	Mohamad Salleh Bin Haji Mohidin	—	—	—
1988-06-23	PC 47848	Rosnan Bin Ribin	—	—	—
1988-06-23	PC 93937	Douglas Hardson s/o Sanggu	—	—	—
1989-05-17	ASP G/5270	Abdul Ghalim Bin Mohamed	—	—	—
1989-05-17	ASP G/6776	Safar Jini Bin Haji Ujang	—	—	—
1989-05-17	Insp I/6219	Lim Kim Sai	—	—	—
1989-05-17	Insp I/8201	Aman Andre Bin Mahari	—	—	—
1989-05-17	Cpl 55545	Zainal Rahim Bin Zainal Abidin	—	—	—
1989-07-25	ASP G/3691	Abu Bakar Bin Ali	—	—	—
1989-11-09	Cpl 62076	Bah Dawel s/t Pitang	—	PFF	Killed in a helicopter crash when a Royal Malaysian Air Force Sikorsky S61 Nuri was shot down by enemy fire at Gunung Gerah near the Perak – Kelantan state border resulting in the death of the officers and six RMAF crews. Few day later, all bodies were found by PASKAU commando forces during the CSAR operations. It is the worse in terms of Malaysian police casualties in a single crash incident to date, matched only by the deaths of fifteen officers.
1989-11-09	Cpl 62456	Alang Itam	—	PFF	Killed in a helicopter crash when a Royal Malaysian Air Force Sikorsky S61 Nuri was shot down by enemy fire at Gunung Gerah near the Perak – Kelantan state border resulting in the death of the officers and six RMAF crews. Few day later, all bodies were found by PASKAU commando forces during the CSAR operations. It is the worse in terms of Malaysian police casualties in a single crash incident to date, matched only by the deaths of fifteen officers.
1989-11-09	PC 62393	Angah s/t Alek	—	PFF	Killed in a helicopter crash when a Royal Malaysian Air Force Sikorsky S61 Nuri was shot down by enemy fire at Gunung Gerah near the Perak – Kelantan state border resulting in the death of the officers and six RMAF crews. Few day later, all bodies were found by PASKAU commando forces during the CSAR operations. It is the worse in terms of Malaysian police casualties in a single crash incident to date, matched only by the deaths of fifteen officers.
1989-11-09	PC 62435	Ejah s/t Long	—	PFF	Killed in a helicopter crash when a Royal Malaysian Air Force Sikorsky S61 Nuri was shot down by enemy fire at Gunung Gerah near the Perak – Kelantan state border resulting in the death of the officers and six RMAF crews. Few day later, all bodies were found by PASKAU commando forces during the CSAR operations. It is the worse in terms of Malaysian police casualties in a single crash incident to date, matched only by the deaths of fifteen officers.
1989-11-09	PC 62444	Pandak s/t Alang	—	PFF	Killed in a helicopter crash when a Royal Malaysian Air Force Sikorsky S61 Nuri was shot down by enemy fire at Gunung Gerah near the Perak – Kelantan state border resulting in the death of the officers and six RMAF crews. Few day later, all bodies were found by PASKAU commando forces during the CSAR operations. It is the worse in terms of Malaysian police casualties in a single crash incident to date, matched only by the deaths of fifteen officers.
1989-11-09	PC 62587	Hassan s/t Itam	—	PFF	Killed in a helicopter crash when a Royal Malaysian Air Force Sikorsky S61 Nuri was shot down by enemy fire at Gunung Gerah near the Perak – Kelantan state border resulting in the death of the officers and six RMAF crews. Few day later, all bodies were found by PASKAU commando forces during the CSAR operations. It is the worse in terms of Malaysian police casualties in a single crash incident to date, matched only by the deaths of fifteen officers.
1989-11-09	PC 68853	Che Hasnor Bin Uval	—	PFF	Killed in a helicopter crash when a Royal Malaysian Air Force Sikorsky S61 Nuri was shot down by enemy fire at Gunung Gerah near the Perak – Kelantan state border resulting in the death of the officers and six RMAF crews. Few day later, all bodies were found by PASKAU commando forces during the CSAR operations. It is the worse in terms of Malaysian police casualties in a single crash incident to date, matched only by the deaths of fifteen officers.
1989-11-09	PC 68970	Hashim Bin Itam	—	PFF	Killed in a helicopter crash when a Royal Malaysian Air Force Sikorsky S61 Nuri was shot down by enemy fire at Gunung Gerah near the Perak – Kelantan state border resulting in the death of the officers and six RMAF crews. Few day later, all bodies were found by PASKAU commando forces during the CSAR operations. It is the worse in terms of Malaysian police casualties in a single crash incident to date, matched only by the deaths of fifteen officers.
1989-11-09	PC 71834	Pandak Hashim Bin Uda	—	PFF	Killed in a helicopter crash when a Royal Malaysian Air Force Sikorsky S61 Nuri was shot down by enemy fire at Gunung Gerah near the Perak – Kelantan state border resulting in the death of the officers and six RMAF crews. Few day later, all bodies were found by PASKAU commando forces during the CSAR operations. It is the worse in terms of Malaysian police casualties in a single crash incident to date, matched only by the deaths of fifteen officers.
1989-11-09	PC 109830	Armada Chos	—	PFF	Killed in a helicopter crash when a Royal Malaysian Air Force Sikorsky S61 Nuri was shot down by enemy fire at Gunung Gerah near the Perak – Kelantan state border resulting in the death of the officers and six RMAF crews. Few day later, all bodies were found by PASKAU commando forces during the CSAR operations. It is the worse in terms of Malaysian police casualties in a single crash incident to date, matched only by the deaths of fifteen officers.
1989-11-09	PC 112548	Hamad s/o Sodan	—	PFF	Killed in a helicopter crash when a Royal Malaysian Air Force Sikorsky S61 Nuri was shot down by enemy fire at Gunung Gerah near the Perak – Kelantan state border resulting in the death of the officers and six RMAF crews. Few day later, all bodies were found by PASKAU commando forces during the CSAR operations. It is the worse in terms of Malaysian police casualties in a single crash incident to date, matched only by the deaths of fifteen officers.
1989-11-09	PC 114771	Alang Sabasah s/o Pab Belkoi	—	PFF	Killed in a helicopter crash when a Royal Malaysian Air Force Sikorsky S61 Nuri was shot down by enemy fire at Gunung Gerah near the Perak – Kelantan state border resulting in the death of the officers and six RMAF crews. Few day later, all bodies were found by PASKAU commando forces during the CSAR operations. It is the worse in terms of Malaysian police casualties in a single crash incident to date, matched only by the deaths of fifteen officers.
1989-11-09	PC 114850	Arus s/t Awang	—	PFF	Killed in a helicopter crash when a Royal Malaysian Air Force Sikorsky S61 Nuri was shot down by enemy fire at Gunung Gerah near the Perak – Kelantan state border resulting in the death of the officers and six RMAF crews. Few day later, all bodies were found by PASKAU commando forces during the CSAR operations. It is the worse in terms of Malaysian police casualties in a single crash incident to date, matched only by the deaths of fifteen officers.
1989-11-09	PC 114956	Shamsuddin Bin Sharin	—	PFF	Killed in a helicopter crash when a Royal Malaysian Air Force Sikorsky S61 Nuri was shot down by enemy fire at Gunung Gerah near the Perak – Kelantan state border resulting in the death of the officers and six RMAF crews. Few day later, all bodies were found by PASKAU commando forces during the CSAR operations. It is the worse in terms of Malaysian police casualties in a single crash incident to date, matched only by the deaths of fifteen officers.
1989-11-09	PC 114957	Sarudin Bin Mat	—	PFF	Killed in a helicopter crash when a Royal Malaysian Air Force Sikorsky S61 Nuri was shot down by enemy fire at Gunung Gerah near the Perak – Kelantan state border resulting in the death of the officers and six RMAF crews. Few day later, all bodies were found by PASKAU commando forces during the CSAR operations. It is the worse in terms of Malaysian police casualties in a single crash incident to date, matched only by the deaths of fifteen officers.
1989-12-26	L/Cpl 76708	Duman Kupok	—	—	—

== 1990s ==
Date	Rank/no	Name	Age	Division/unit	Circumstance
1990-02-25	PC 123572	Mohamed Izaini Bin Hj Idris	—	—	—
1990-02-28	Cpl 40385	Saad Bin Hassan	—	FRU	57 troops of FRU based at PULAPOL Semarak Street on their way on time to test Ops Musang together with four other vehicles of FRU to Kuala Terengganu. En route at Kilometre 32.5 of the Kuala Lumpur–Karak Highway, the express bus from Temerloh-Kuala Lumpur suddenly barrelled down from the hill, and hitting six cars, one fuel tank, pick-up truck, taxi, Vege truck and trailer before impacting against the FRU truck. Five personnel were killed on the spot of the accident, whereas other members died on arrival at the Kuala Lumpur Hospital. Four civilians were also killed in the accident and 11 officers were wounded.
1990-02-28	Cpl 56567	Mohd Hilmi Bin Ismail	—	FRU	
1990-02-28	L/Cpl 50546	Shahimi Bin Lazim	—	FRU	
1990-02-28	L/Cpl 88880	Mohd Som Bin Putih	—	FRU	
1990-02-28	PC 66754	Wan Mazland Bin Bidin	—	FRU	
1990-02-28	PC 74443	Mohd Razali Bin Bidin	—	FRU	
1990-02-28	PC 89111	Sazali Bin Hussin	—	FRU	
1990-02-28	PC 97225	Mohd Samsudin Bin Hamid	—	FRU	
1990-02-28	PC 97347	Abd Razak Bin Sharif	—	FRU	
1990-02-28	PC 110462	Mohd Lazim Bin Admin	—	FRU	
1990-02-28	PC 111406	Gua Kok Kiong	—	FRU	
1990-03-04	Cpl 58821	Harun Bin Rosdi	—	—	—
1990-05-12	D/PC 67401	Sidek Bin Mohd Som	—	CID	Battered and shot by a drug suspect, who had grabbed his gun, as he was questioning another suspect on 6th of KL Police Headquarters.
1991-7-10	PC	Dugi Muin	25	PFF	Both killed in traffic accident Km326 Jalan Raub-Kuala Lipis.
1991-7-10	PC	Nor Zambri Abdul Aziz	26	PFF	Both killed in traffic accident Km326 Jalan Raub-Kuala Lipis.
1990-11-14	PC 124690	Karami Bin Awang	—	—	—
1991-11-17	DSP G/7506	Abdul Karim Bin Haji Idris	38	—	Killed in a plane crash in Sabah.
1991-11-17	ASP	Nordin bin Yunus	34	—	Killed in a plane crash in Sabah.
1991-11-17	Cpl 52180	Hashim Bin Jalil	45	—	Killed in a plane crash in Sabah.
1992-01-06	PC 108067	Salleh bin Mohd Yassin	30	—	Shot death in scuffle with detainee.
1992-08-09	PC 98719	Muhamad Asri Bin Husin	—	—	—
1992-12-26	PC 114302	Abdul Rahim Bin Manan	24	Cheras	Shots and killed by the crime group known as Gang Commandos. The incidents began when PC 114302 with two members, including PC 82116 Ghazali guarding Cheras Police Duty Hut before seeing a Ford Laser car boarded by three men. Seeing their state, whirling in the housing area at 12 am, PC 114302 makes a decision to stop the car. After the car pulled up at a road junction, PC 114302 and PC 82116 approaches all three men and ordered them out of the car. At the same time, PC 114302 asked one of them to open the car bonnet, and unaware, a suspect took out his M16 rifle, firing three rounds shot at both officers before fleeing. The shots resulting PC 114302 dying at the scene whereas PC 82116 was also shot by a bullet falling in front of the car. One more officer took shelter in a big drain and returned fire at one of the criminals. A few years after the incident, Geng Komando members were arrested and hanged to death.
1993-02-02	PC 115526	Mokhtar Bin Aman	—	—	—
1993-03-13	D/Cpl 63037	Azami Bin Othman	—	—	Killed by drug tracficker in Air Itanm. Both were them received the Pingat Gagah Pewira posthumously on Penang governor's birthday awards.
1993-03-13	D/Cpl 70109	Othman Bin Abdul Wahab	—	—	Killed by drug tracficker in Air Itanm. Both were them received the Pingat Gagah Pewira posthumously on Penang governor's birthday awards.
1994-03-29	PC 118108	Bhomeddin Bin Ngah	—	—	—
1994-04-18	PC 117151	Abu Bakar Ganeson Bin Abdullah	—	—	—
1998-03-26	Cpl 75748	Md Nosruddin Bin Yeop	35	FRU	Killed during the riot by illegal immigrants at the Semenyih Detention Camp, Kajang, Selangor. In the bloody riots at 7:30 a.m., eight Indonesian illegal immigrants were also killed while 30 more police officers were wounded including four of them seriously. The riot sparked when immigrants outcried on police massive operation to send them back from 1 a.m. morning. The illegal immigrants acted aggressively and used iron blades and stones as a weapon to against the officers as well as burning five residence blocks, originating in Block B causing four of the blocks to be burnt. Cpl 75748 was given the same promotion posthumously, and was awarded the Seri Pahlawan Gagah Perkasa by Yang DiPertuan Besar Negeri Sembilan, Tuanku Jaafar.
1998-07-15	PC 132304	Ahmad Nasarudin Bin Reji	20	Bangi	Stabbed to death by four suspected thieves during a joint police operation, investigating the theft of construction materials at a light industrial area along the Kajang-Bangi Street. PC 132304 had finished his day shift but volunteered to help beef up the police party without a weapon to arrest the four men, who were stashing steel bars at a nearby undergrowth, and bolted in different directions when the police party ambushed them. The police members separated to continue the pursuit and managed to arrest two Indonesian nationals later found to be illegal immigrants. His body was found lying face down in the undergrowth with a chest wound. Meanwhile, K9 tracker dogs and light infantry General Operations Force personnel were combing the vicinity for the suspect or suspects still at large. Following the incident, 80 immigrants in the area, mostly with identification documents, were detained for questioning.

== 2000s ==
Date	Rank/no	Name	Age	Division/unit	Circumstance
2000-03-27	Cpl	Ismail Bin Ibrahim	—	VAT-69	Parachute accident during the basic training at PGK B Training Facilities, Ulu Kinta, Perak
2000-05-02	Cpl 110992	Idrus Bin Johar	39	VAT-69	Parachute accident during the basic training at PGK B Training Facilities, Ulu Kinta, Perak
2000-05-02	D/Cpl 59151	Sagadevan s/o Rajoo	49	SB	Executed by Al-Ma'unah gunmen, Jemari Jusoh during the Bukit Jenalik Incident. Died alongside an army commando personnel, Trooper Matthew Anak Medan and was buried next to the trooper. He was given a posthumous promotion to the rank of Sergeant.
2003-01-23	SM 46785	Talib Bin Nasir	52	Johore	Collapsed shortly after trying to apprehend a drug pusher in Kampung Keremoyang, Ulu Benut, Pontian. In the incident at about 2:30 pm, Talib who also is Simpang Renggam Deputy Police Chief received information that there was one man who was suspected of being a drug pusher in the locality. Talib going alone had gone after that man and caught up with the suspect. That man was handcuffed together with Talib, a scuffle ensued during an escape attempt until Talib caused the man to suffocate, Talib then fell before being taken to Kluang Hospital by a civilian. However, Talib who was believed to have had a heart attack dies later while the suspect managed to escape.
2003-08-10	L/Cpl	Hanapi Bin Atan	41	Traffic Police	Killed after being hit by a 150cc Yamaha TZM which did not manage to stop in the third road at a traffic police roadblock along Connaught Highway towards Cheras. The incident occurred at 11:50 am when L/Cpl Hanapi and one officer and three members were at a speed trap and cones in the highway before the start of the roadblock operation. The motorcycle was ridden by a young man with his girlfriend. Abruptly four motorcycles ridden by four young men with their couples came towards L/Cpl Hanapi, who had been standing on the third route highway. Three motorcycles avoided crashing him because they used the second route but another went into the third route, not managing to stop and barged Hanapi. A strictly accurate stampede in the crotch slit caused L/Cpl Hanapi to be thrown about 10 metres from the spot. He suffered severe bleeding on the head, waist and foot, and then was taken by his two partners to the National Malaysian University Hospital (HUKM) for treatment. L/Cpl Hanapi died on arrival to hospital at 12:10 am.
2003-08-14	L/Cpl 100563	Mohd Marzuki Bin Hj Redwan	48	Johore	Killed when the car lost control crashing into those who sat at the table placed in road shoulder at Edge 4, Tun Razak Street, Larkin, Johor Bahru. The incident occurred at 03:00, about 10 customers were enjoying breakfast on the road shoulder and both policemen were on duty. While both of the policemen were ordering food, a Honda car lost control, skidded, and crashed into a well-off Proton Wira car on the left side road. The Honda then crashed into customers in the cafe causing both the policemen to be thrown while the restaurant helper was jammed between the car and cafe walls. L/Cpl 100563 suffered wounds on the head, broken left and right legs and suffered serious internal injuries and died at the scene. Yusri also suffered a seriously wounded leg and head and arrived at Sultanah Aminah Hospital emergency ward where he died at 03:55 pm. One more victim, Ummi Hamidah reported unconscious after sustaining injuries on the head and legs while the Honda car driver had fractured legs, and received treatment in the same hospital. A 28-year-old car driver who worked at a factory and had one summons involving mistaken speed driving at Raub, Pahang prosecuted under Section 41(1) Transport Act 1987 amendments 2002 because of causing death.
2003-08-14	PC	Yusri Bin Yakob	28	Johore	
2004-08-01	Cpl 83567	Manja Bin Manaf	40	Johore	Cpl 83567 was killed in action and his partner, L/Cpl 92761 Razali Abu Bakar, was severely injured when they were shot at close range by two armed robbers with pistols in Muar, Johor. In the incident at about 11 pm, a police patrolman was shot dead and his partner was injured when two robbers opened fire on the police officers as the criminals emerged from robbing a house in Maharani Park. Manja suffered a critical wound with gunshot wounds in the rib dying on arrival at the Sultanah Fatimah Specialist Hospital, while Razali Abu Bakar was shot in the left shoulder received treatment at the same hospital and was reported to be recovering.
2005-06-23	D/Cpl	Che Omar Bin Che Ibrahim	47	Narcotics Department, Dang Wangi Police Headquarters	Collapsed and died during a scuffle with a drug addict in Jalan Raja Laut near the notorious Lorong Haji Taib addicts haunt.
2005-09-02	Cpl	Pi Lim Tanong	46	Sabah	Incident occurred around 9:30 am, Cpl Pi Lim Tanong and Cpl Husin Abd. Rashid, 48, from Nabawan Police Station trying to persuade Manais Angsaring, the 40s, the man was suspected to be mentally deranged from Kampung Pandiwan, Nabawan. However, the attempt to persuade him failed and upon doing so, Manais withdrew a machete and struck Cpl Tanong fatally with it. Cpl Tanong died on the spot after being critically wounded due to a slash on the neck, head and abdomen Cpl Husin survived but he suffered serious wounds on the head and chest. However, Manais was shot dead by police while coming to give support, where he was seen to be holding the machete and Tanong's firearm.
2005-09-18	L/Cpl	Ridzuan Bin Jaafar	41	Penang	Killed in a traffic accident when a car carrying four people went out of control and ploughed into a roadblock under a flyover killing seven people at 2:02 am at Tengku Kudin Street. The car driver lost control of the car after hitting a railing. The car turned upside down and slid towards the motorcycle lane knocking down everything in its way. The car screeched to a stop after hitting L/Cpl Ridzuan Jaafar, PC(V) Shamsuri Mohamed, PC(V) Lok Wan Loo and motorcyclist Mohamad Izwan Badri, 19, resulting Shamsuri and Izwan dying on the spot while Ridzuan and Lok died in hospital. The driver Rokaib Mohd Amin, 20, and a passenger Azura Romli, 20, died on the spot while another passenger Mohamad Azrul Nayan died in hospital. Another passenger Mohd Taufik Abdul Hamid, who miraculously survived, managed to crawl out of the mangled car.
2005-09-18	PC(V)	Shamsuri Bin Mohamed	30	Penang	
2005-09-18	PC(V)	Lok Wan Loo	35	Penang	
2006-07-23	MPC 144598	Mohd Juriya Bin Awang	27	Marine	At 28 June, the marine police patrol boat from Pasir Panjang Marine Police Station which was on routine duties, capsized and sank in heavy seas about two nautical miles (4 km) off Pasir Panjang, Sekinchan. Cpl Ahmad Zubairi Shahudin and MPC Mohd Khairi Seman, two of the crew were in the boat, however, managed to swim to shore, according to the spokesman, while MPC 144598 went missing and intensive search and rescue efforts by police, Fire and Rescue Services Department, Malaysian Marine Department and local villagers were mounted to locate him. Three weeks later, his body was later found at 7.5 nautical miles (13.9 km) off Pulau Payar, near the Kuala Kedah river.
2006-09-09	PC 152925	Mohd Fakaruddin Bin Zakaria	24	Selangor	Death during a struggle when trying to arrest a man in the patrol to prevent crime in Kampung Baru in Semenyih. The incident occurred at 02:00 in the morning, late on duty at the Semenyih police station patrolling the village with his fellow officer L/Cpl Minhat Wahit, before spotting two men who were behaving suspiciously. Both men then tried to escape as soon as they spotted the two officers. PC 152925 and his partner later pursued both men, and he succeeded in capturing one of them, while the other escaped. He however was stabbed in the left chest while struggling with the criminal and the man escaped PC 15295 and died on the way to the hospital. PC 152925 was given the same promotion posthumously and was awarded the Panglima Gagah Berani by Yang DiPertuan Agung, Tuanku Mizan Zainal Abidin.
2007-04-05	PC 159709	Harry Sim	21	Perak	At 12:50 pm, PC 159709 and his partner, L/Cpl 142803 Nik Mohd Anizam Ramli, 26, was carrying out patrols and running across a suspect who was levering the door of a car. L/Cpl 142803 and PC 159709 rode two separate motorcycles and had been pursuing the suspect who escaped with a motorcycle heading to the street. Both the policeman took between 10 and 15 minutes to catch up and squeeze the suspect's motorcycle at Kilometre 48 Ipoh-Kuala Lumpur Street, about one kilometre from Temoh Police Station. The suspect began kicking the officer's motorcycle when the officer attempted to arrest causing PC 159709 to lose control of his motorcycle passing and skidding at the right side of the road and crashing into a trailer leaver in the road. PC 159709 suffered a critical wound on his head, and elbow and broke his right leg arriving at the Tapah Hospital but died in the hospital a few hours later.
2007-06-01	L/Cpl	Md Isa Bin Hashim	46	Malacca	Killed after being hit by a fuel tank lorry which was believed to be driven at high speeds from Cheng to Bukit Rambai which resulted in a loss of control and collided with that patrol car. He was on duty as Patrol Car Branch in Tanjung Minyak Police Station, Malacca dying three hours later after arriving at Malacca Hospital. Fellow officer, PC Mohd Ariffin Ulin, 21, was wounded. The lorry driver, 39, pleaded guilty under Section 41(1) Transport Act 1987 for causing the death.
2007-09-27	AP/Cpl	Mohd Rusni Bin Muda	35	Auxiliary Police	Three Bank Simpanan Nasional Auxiliary policemen, Cpl Mohd Rusni from Kuala Terengganu; Cpl Che Yusri and Cpl Mohd Soupi, both from Kelantan were killed in a traffic accident at KM43.5 Karak Highway near Bukit Tinggi, Bentong, Pahang when on the way to send RM1 millions to the bank branch in Raub and Kuala Lipis. While Sgt Khairuddin Zainal Abidin, 38, also from Kelantan only suffered light wounds and was treated at Bentong Hospital. In the incident around 11 am, both were on the way from BSN headquarter in Kuala Lumpur bringing money to be distributed to BSN branch in Raub and Kuala Lipis. During the arrival at the scene, 4WD vehicles were believed to have lost control before skidding and hitting the iron fence at the left and right side of the road before overturning. Due to the accident, three of them were thrown out of their vehicle. Mohd Rusni was in the back seat and died on the spot while a driver, Che Yusri and Mohd Soupi died in Bentong Hospital.
2007-09-27	AP/Cpl	Che Yusri Bin Yusoff	36	Auxiliary Police	
2007-09-27	AP/Cpl	Mohd Soupi Bin Yaacob	35	Auxiliary Police	
2007-10-25	L/Cpl 133846	Jayabalan s/o Jayakrishnan	30	NCID	The police, who were in plainclothes, were led by investigation officer Chief Inspector Rajakumar Laju from Bukit Aman Commercial Criminal Investigation Department and Chief Inspector Helmi Zakaria from Gombak Narcotic Department with four team members. During an anti-drug ambush at a house in TS2 Street, Suria Park, Desa Aman Village at 7 pm 25 October 2008 which was believed to be a port for drug smugglers. Before carrying out the ambush, a couple of cars arrived externally and several men in the two cars suddenly opened fire at the officers at point blank range before fleeing, hitting L/Cpl 133846 in both sides of his chest and he was killed at the scene, while L/Cpl 117762 sustained a fatal gunshot wound near his stomach and died on the way to the Sungai Buloh Hospital. Two officers, Chief Insp Rajakuma Laju and Chief Insp Helmi Zakaria were wounded and treated at Selayang Hospital and Sungai Buloh Hospital. The gunmen escaped but were apprehended several months later.
2007-10-25	L/Cpl 117762	Alagesan s/o Mariyappan	—	Selangor	
2008-07-08	TPC 166048	Felix s/t Merikan	33	PULAPOL	Collapsed shortly and died after complaining of breathing difficulties during the Constable Basic Training 1/2008 series conducted at the PULAPOL, Sarawak. He joined the force on 1 November 1995 at the rank of Extra Police Constable (EPC) and duties in GOF Sarawak Brigade, Serian District Police Headquarters and Sarawak State Police Headquarters.
2008-07-29	L/Cpl 104349	Othman Bin Abdul Rahman	47	Selangor	Collapsed shortly while commencing final duties, securing the three accused in the murder case of Altantuya Shaariibuu before he fell unconscious in Shah Alam High Court at 9:05 am. Once the accused went into the court, L/Cpl 104349 is seen complaining of breathing difficulties and his face became bluish-white before he fell unconscious at the outdoor located side court. His colleague, PC Abu Bakar Hussin and PC Jagjit Singh quickly gave her Cardiopulmonary Resuscitation (CPR). As well as, Abdul Razak's (accused) daughter, Roweena also guided the CPR technique. When L/Cpl 104349 was back breathing, six policemen and a civilian carried Othman stretched out on a couch to be brought down through a lift. Because the seat was too long the lift door could not be closed; they then carried Othman through the stairs to be brought to the hospital. However, he had a heart attack and suffocated, he was confirmed dead at 1:15 pm at National Heart Institute (IJN).
2008-11-29	L/Cpl 151713	Mohd Azlan Bin Saihidin	—	Johore	Killed in the traffic accident.
2008-12-05	L/Cpl 68858	Hasir s/o Sari	52	GOF	Collapsed shortly and died after he fell unconscious from the chair during rest in the control post at 18th Battalions, Pengkalan Hulu, Perak.
2008-12-23	APC	Nurhafiz Bin Hanafi	23	Auxiliary Police	24 December 2008 - AP Constable Nurhafiz Hanafi, 23, was shot accidentally in the stomach by his partner while trying to apprehend a cable thief at the Templer Street railway station. In the incident around 3 pm, Hafiz, his partner and AP Shahrizan Izhar Constable rank, had gone after a 31-year-old man Burmese whom they suspected of having stolen railroad communications cables on several other occasions. Both from the Malayan Railway Limited (KTMB) Auxiliary Police Investigation Unit chased the suspect opposite Sri Sentosa Park, off Old Klang Street. The auxiliary policeman is currently investigated under the Section 302 Penal Code while suspect who tried to steal a cable investigated under the Section 379 Penal Code. Allahyarham Nurhafiz was born in Hutan Melintang, Perak and has served in KTMB for three years. He was buried in Bagan Datoh Islamic Cemetery, Perak after the autopsy was completed.
2009-02-23	Cpl 105362	Azam Bin Mokhtar	44	Malacca	Killed in a traffic accident at Tehel-Jasin Street.
2009-05-06	L/Cpl 68938	Ngah Nordin Bin Abu	49	GOF	L/Cpl 68938's body found by his colleague lying with bloodstained on the floor at Malaysia-Thailand border control post in Kwan Chu Hill at 11:30 in the morning. He was from the 3rd GOF Battalions in Bidor, Perak just arriving at his post the day before and during the incident, he was alone in the post. His body was sent to Tuanku Fauziah Hospital for autopsy and pending the results of the autopsy, the case is classified as sudden death. Also found beside his body was M16 rifle, however until now, they have yet to find if the shot was caused by the weapon.
2009-07-02	WPC 167210	Nur Syazana Binte Abd Razak	22	Terengganu	Both police officers were killed at the scene when they failed to control the motorcycle and falling down causing their head to tread on the road surface along Sultan Muhamad Street, Gong Kapas, Kuala Terengganu on 14:30 hrs, near Kuala Terengganu UMNO Office. WPC 167210 was the first policewoman of the Royal Malaysian Police to die while on duty. The incident occurred when they were on the way to start their duty at 3 pm. Before the incident, PC 167619 living together with four roommates in a rented house in Gong Tok Nasek Village, went to police barracks in Padang Hiliran to take WPC 167210 who was on the same duty shift at 14:15 hrs at Kuala Terengganu District Police Headquarter. When arriving at the scene, a truck headed for Kuantan, suddenly veered from left astarboard road, causing a rub against their motorcycle.
2009-07-02	PC 167619	Mohd Akmal Akram Bin Ismail	20	Terengganu	
2009-07-11	PC 161529	Mohd. Faizal Bin Ahmad	—	GOF	Died at Tengku Ampuan Afzan Hospital after two days of treatment. PC 161529 with suspected dengue fever collapsed shortly during a D-class driving course at Police Training Centre, Kuala Lumpur on 9 July.
2009-07-22	S/L/Cpl 14519	Azizu Bin Mat Shafei	28	Petaling Jaya	The Mobile Patrol Vehicle he was on patrol duty when it lost control, skidded, and crashed into a road shoulder along Mahogany Street, Sri Damansara. He was on duty alone, suffering a wound on the head which resulted in his death.
2009-09-17	PC	Selvaganesan Chandran	—	Perak	Selvaganesan was kidnapped when two vehicles blocked his car at the Sri Stulang apartments at 4am on Sept 17. At least five men, some armed with iron rods and parang, emerged from the vehicles and smashed the windscreen of the policeman’s car before pulling him out of the vehicle and hitting him repeatedly. Selvaganesan was then bundled into one of the vehicles before the men drove off, leaving the woman, in her 20s, behind. Nearby residents alerted the police, thinking it was a gang fight.

== 2010s ==
Date	Rank/no	Name	Age	Division/unit	Circumstance
2010-03-20	E/L/Cpl 5610	Lee Kui San	57	Sarikei	Killed at the scene when a Naza Citra MPV boarded by three men lost control before encountering and collided with his police Land Rover at Kilometer 100, Sri Aman-Sarikei Street. The incident occurred at approximately 2:15 am that morning, a Land Rover driven by Lee carrying the dead body of motorcyclist, Zainol Zuhri Amit, 20, who was killed after his motorcycle collided with an electric pole in Simpang Senggalang, Debak Laut Street, about three hours before the accident and en route to Betong Hospital with five family members and one policemen, PC Chenancoe David David, 25. Besides Lee, Zainol Zuhri's grandfather, Omar Ilu, 67; MPV driver, Ngalambong Ranggau, 30; his brother, Chaong, 39, and their friend, Robert Unya Intai Mathew, 33 died at the scene. While PC Chenancoe, Zainol's father, Amit Omar, 43; his brother, Saidi, 36, and their brother, Matahir Mahmud, 39, and Peter Nen, 41 wounded. Police are still conducting investigations of accidents that claimed five lives in accordance with Section 41 (1) Road Transport Act 1987.
2010-07-14	Sgt 69165	Saidin Bin Mohd Dom	54	Taiping	Died about one hour after being admitted for treatment at the hospital when a bomb exploded while they were undergoing training at the Kampar District Police Headquarters (IPD) Firing Range. The incident occurred at about 5:30 pm, Sgt 69165 was among 40 personnel from Perak who were undergoing a Bomb Disposal Course at the firing range since this morning, he and four officers were checking a bomb that did not go off when the incident occurred. An officer who was seriously injured, Sgt Saat Bin Salleh, also from Taiping, was rushed to the Raja Permaisuri Bainun Hospital(HRPB), Ipoh after receiving initial treatment at the Kampar Hospital while three other officers, Sgt Zulkifli Bin Ijum from Ipoh Police District Headquarters, Lance Corporal Mohd Nor Firdaus from the Perak Police Contingent Headquarters and Corporal Kamaruddin Ismail from the Federal Reserve Unit (FRU) Sungai Senam, Ipoh received outpatient treatment.
2010-09-27	Sgt 72472	Mohd Hashamdi Bin Abdullah	52	GOF	Killed in a traffic accident during a return trip to 15th Battalion Headquarters in Karamunting City.
2010-09-27	L/Cpl 135379	Sylvester Assin	36	GOF	Killed in a traffic accident during a return trip to 15th Battalion Headquarters in Karamunting City.
2010-09-27	L/Cpl 137381	Agustine Lee	31	GOF	Killed in a traffic accident during a return trip to 15th Battalion Headquarters in Karamunting City.
2010-09-27	L/Cpl 148923	Mohd Sapieh Bin Jalhani	32	GOF	Killed in a traffic accident during a return trip to 15th Battalion Headquarters in Karamunting City.
2012-03-24	Cpl 102407	Ismayuddin Bin Ismail	50	Traffic	Cpl 102407 was run over by a tourist bus from Singapore while manning traffic at the Johore Customs, Immigration and Quarantine (CIQ) Complex, Wong Ah Fook Street, Johor Bahru, Johore at about 11:35 pm. The bus with a Singapore-registered charter bus was believed to have lost control and collided with a lorry and a car, then rammed into the road barrier. Cpl 102407 was standing on the road divider at the time and tried to stop the bus from escaping after hitting the cars but ended up getting knocked down. He died on the spot. The bus driver, Wong Lin Chan, a 49-year-old Malaysian, tried to flee but was arrested 150m from the scene of the crash. She worked with Singapore Advanced Coach Pte Ltd at the time and pleaded guilty under Section 41(1) Transport Act 1987 for causing dead was ordered to pay RM10,000 as compensation to the Cpl 102407's wife, Norsiah Mohd Amin.
2013-03-01	Insp G/17992	Zulkifli Bin Mamat	29	VAT-69	The police commandos led by a field officer, Insp G/17992 tracked down a terrorist group from Southern Philippines known as "Royal Security Forces of the Sultanate of Sulu and North Borneo" during the 2013 Lahad Datu standoff. The terrorist held a stick with a white paper attached to it while two others flanked him and pointed their guns at police commandos at an oil palm estate in Felda Sahabat 17, near the Lahad Datu, Sabah. When the Insp G/17992 moved closer to the group, the terrorist suddenly opened fire into the officer's head at point-blank range, killing him instantly. Cpl 113088 attempted to help him but he was also shot dead. During the battle, 12 sultanate's men were killed while two more police commandos were wounded. Both of Insp G/17992 and Cpl 113088 was given a posthumous promotion, where the Insp G/17992 given a rank of ASP, while Cpl 113088 given a rank of Sergeant.
2013-03-01	Cpl 113088	Sabaruddin Bin Daud	47	VAT-69	
2013-03-02	Supt G/10768	Ibrahim Bin Lebar	52	SB	Part of a police party investigated a house in Sri Jaya Village at 6:30 am which they believed to house the existence of a cache of firearms and to be a Sulu terrorist hideout in the village off the coast of Semporna, Sabah. Before carrying out the investigation at the one house, armed terrorists believed to be less than 10 in number armed with AK-47, M14, M16, and SLR suddenly opened fire, hitting Supt G/10768, ASP G/15053, D/Sgt 110204, Sgt 124082, L/Cpl 160475 and E/Cpl 12675 and they were killed at the scene. One more SB officer, D/Insp G/16537 Mohamad Hasnal Bin Jamil was wounded due to an attack by a terrorist armed with an axe, while six terrorists were shot dead by other officers, one more terrorist was beaten to death by villagers and three more managed to escape. Both of dead officers was given a posthumous promotion.
2013-03-02	ASP G/15053	Michael S/O Padel	36	SB	
2013-03-02	D/Sgt 110204	Baharin Bin Hamit	49	SB	
2013-03-02	Sgt 124082	Abd Aziz Bin Sarikon	48	GOF	
2013-03-02	L/Cpl 160475	Mohd Azrul Bin Tukiran	27	GOF	
2013-03-02	E/Cpl 12675	Salam Bin Togiran	42	Tawau	
2013-09-23	Cpl 147723	Zal-Azri Bin Abd Somad	31	C.I.D D4	Killed in a struggle to detain a 17-year-old suspect in an operation, code-named “Ops Lejang”, at Taman Teknologi Cheng, Malacca. An incident occurred about 8 am when Cpl 147723 went after the suspect who attempted to flee, during which a struggle broke out between the two men.
2014-03-04	Cpl 93386	Raja Aizam Bin Raja Mohd	53	Patrol car	Stabbed to death by three Indonesians who were attempting to steal his weapon. He and his partner, Cpl Mohd Aidil Bin Mustafa, 29, was performing a routine patrol of the area at Taman Sentosa, Klang when they noticed several individuals behaving in a suspicious manner. They proceeded to search these individuals when one of them grabbed his gun and tried firing at him. While trying to shoot the pistol jammed but in the ensuing tussle, Cpl 93386 was stabbed with an unknown weapon. At this point, Cpl Mohd Aidil managed to grab his partner's gun and subsequently shot dead two men. Another police team arrived at the scene to find Cpl 93386 lying in a drain while Cpl Mohd Aidil had suffered head and face wounds. The wounded officers were taken to the Tengku Ampuan Rahimah Hospital where Cpl 93386 was pronounced ‘dead of arrival’.
2014-05-26	L/Cpl 169004	Mohd Azwan Bin Abdullah	25	Police patrol	L/Cpl 169004 and his colleague from the Kerian police motorcycle patrol unit had acted on a public tip-off that robbers had held up the driver of a cigarette van before emptying its contents into a Toyota Wish at the 10th mile Parit Buntar-Alor Pongsu, Perak. They were trailing the car when the motorcycle collided from the rear with a Honda Civic driven by the robbers’ accomplice. The impact resulted in L/Cpl 169004 being flung off the motorcycle into a drain. He died on the spot. The Toyota Wish was later found burnt in a banana plantation near Lunas in Kedah, some 60 km away from the scene.
2014-07-13	Cpl 151279	Ab Rajah Bin Jamuan	32	Marine	An armed gunmen which were suspected to be Sulu terrorist or Abu Sayyaf militiamen believed to be less than eight in the number using heavy arms ambushed the marine police officers, resulting Cpl 151279 being killed in action, while his colleague, MPC 176543 Zakiah Aleip, was missing, believed to have been kidnapped. The group attired in jungle fatigue pants, black coloured clothes and their face covered had planned to kidnap someone at the Mabul Water Bungalow Resort, Mabul Island, Semporna, however, they encountered the officers before attacking them. Cpl 151279's remains were found on surface water near the jetty while MPC 176543 has been released seven months later. This is the first fatality involving a security force personnel in preventing a kidnapping.
2015-03-02	Cpl 116843	Dzulkhairi Bin Ahmad	48	Kuala Lumpur	Cpl 116843 and PC 182861 was on guard duty at the storeroom containing court exhibits at Belfield Street, Kampung Attap at about 7:45 pm when the tree came crashing down following heavy rain. The impact of the crash resulted in PC 182861 dying at the scene while Cpl 116843 died on the way to Kuala Lumpur Hospital. Meanwhile, 28 officers from the Sungai Besi and Hang Tuah Police Stations were involved in the operation to extricate the victims from the container.
2015-03-02	PC 182861	Mohd Sharil Hisham Bin Hashamdi	25	Kuala Lumpur	Cpl 116843 and PC 182861 was on guard duty at the storeroom containing court exhibits at Belfield Street, Kampung Attap at about 7:45 pm when the tree came crashing down following heavy rain. The impact of the crash resulted in PC 182861 dying at the scene while Cpl 116843 died on the way to Kuala Lumpur Hospital. Meanwhile, 28 officers from the Sungai Besi and Hang Tuah Police Stations were involved in the operation to extricate the victims from the container.
2015-04-04	Cpl 148953	Mohd Razkan Bin Seran	32	UTK	Cpl 148953 who was on duty as the bodyguard of Rompin Member of Parliament, Tan Sri Jamaluddin Jarjis killed when a Eurocopter AS3655N2 Dauphin (Registration Number 9M-1GB) crashed into a jungle along Jalan Sungai Lalang in Kampung Pasir Baru, Semenyih, Kajang, while flying from Pahang to Subang. Also in the crash besides Jamaluddin, is a Kedah businessman, CEO of SP Baiduri Sdn Bhd, Dato' Robert Tan Huat Seang, Private Secretary in the Prime Minister's Office, Dato' Seri Azlin Alias, a pilot, Captain Cliff Fournier and co-pilot, Ajdiana Baiziera.
2015-09-06	Insp G/18718	Margaret Tagum Anak Goen	32	Traffic	Ran over by a Mat Rempit. Insp G/18718 was given a posthumous promotion as a rank of ASP.
2016-05-05	L/Cpl 185816	Ahmad Sobri Bin Haron	26	Bukit Aman	L/Cpl 185816 carrying the duty as the bodyguard of Deputy Plantation Industries and Commodities Minister Noriah Kasnon; her husband Asmuni Abdullah, boarded a Eurocopter AS350 helicopter together with the ministry's secretary-general Dr Sundaran Annamalai; Kuala Kangsar Member of Parliament Wan Muhammad Khair-il Anuar Wan Ahmad; and Filipino pilot Captain Rudolf Rex Ragas left Spaoh Stadium, Betong, at 4:12 pm, en route to Kuching. However, three minutes later, the chopper lost contact with the control tower. At 9:30 pm, the search and rescue team was deployed. On 6 May, 10:20 am, the helicopter was found at the Batang Lupar river near the Sebuyau, then they found the bodies of victims, including L/Cpl 185816 at noon
2016-07-29	Sgt 98381	Abu Samah Bin Abu Hassan	57	Police patrol	Sgt 98381 was on inspection of police cars at the workshop at Serdang District Police Headquarters. While taking inspection, his fellow officer, the lance corporal who was on duty at the armoury, located about 70 meters from the workshop, was emptying the bullet chamber of a Walther PPK pistol. Without realizing it, loading a single round into the handgun, he accidentally discharged a gunshot, hitting Sgt 98381 at the back of his head. He suffered a critical wound and died in the hospital six hours later.
2017-08-31	L/Cpl 172031	Valentino S/O Mesa	29	Selangor	Assaulted in close range by his assailants. At the time as the officer had carried out an inspection at the station at 1:30 am. The suspect, a 35-year-old man from Sarawak, and a relative of the victim, attacked him with a sharp weapon on his forehead before he grabbed the officer's service weapon and shot him in the back of the head at close range. Prior to the murder, police arrested a cop killer at about 1 am, at Kuala Lumpur International Airport however pistol Walther P99 belong L/Cpl Valentino only found a few years later when use by unknown person who related killer. Another man including a 35-year-old man, who was connected with the murder was arrested.
2017-10-11	SM 97080	Abdul Hakim Bin Samingan	54	Traffic	Both of Dungun traffic policemen were participants of the In-Service Training convoy, killed when they were hit by a KIA-type lorry at KM139 Jalan Kuala Terengganu - Kuantan at 2:55 pm. They were riding long-distance on a heavy motorcycle from Mersing, Johor to Kuala Terengganu. During the arrival at the scene of the incident, the lorry suddenly entered the path of the convoy, suspected to be because the driver had lost control of the vehicle. Both victims were believed to have been unable to avoid the lorry. They were thrown onto the shoulder of the road by the impact of the lorry and died at the scene due to severe head and body injuries.
2017-10-11	Cpl 139652	Suresh S/O Itchang	36	Traffic	
2018-04-06	Cpl 149136	Dommy Bin Tugok	30	Bukit Aman	
2018-10-23	SM	Roslan Bin Maon	50	Pahang	Killed after their patrol car were providing escort for vehicles transporting the Sijil Pelajaran Malaysia (SPM) examination papers skidded and crashed into a metal guardrail at KM183 of the East Coast Highway near Maran. Both attached to the Pahang state police headquarters were travelling from Bentong towards Kuantan when Roslan lost control of the Proton Waja, causing it to skid and crash into the guardrail. The vehicle was pinned under the guardrail while the impact of the crash resulted in Roslan being flung out of the car while EPC 23056 was trapped in his seat. Fire Department was assisting at the scene and the bodies were sent to Jengka Hospital for post-mortem. Investigations revealed that it was raining during the incident and the patrol car skidded due to the slippery road.
2018-10-23	EPC 23056	Watson S/O Edin	23	Pahang	
2019-11-06	L/Cpl 182328	Saifullah Bin Mohamad	32	Johor	Knocked down by a lorry at Jalan Changong, Pasir Puteh, Seri Alam. Both officers from Seri Alam District Police headquarters were loading their stuff into a police Land Rover after finishing up a roadblock when they were hit by a lorry that was travelling from Kota Masai to Taman Pasir Puteh. The lorry driver had lost control of the vehicle, which was traveling from Kota Masai towards Taman Pasir Puteh, ramming five of the six officers and the Land Rover that was parked on the roadside, killing L/Cpl 182328 and E/L/Cpl 20839 immediately while the three other policemen and the 47-year-old driver were injured and treated at Hospital Sultan Ismail (HSI). The other policeman escaped unhurt. An investigation is ongoing under Section 41(1) of the Road Transport Act 1987.
2019-11-06	E/L/Cpl 20839	Mohamad Johari Bin Rosli	32	Johor	

== 2020s ==
Date	Rank/no	Name	Age	Division/unit	Circumstance
2020-04-19	ASP	Aldrin s/o Gonda	38	Alor Setar	Killed in traffic accident in Alor Setar, Kedah
2020-04-20	Sgt 97283	A.Rahman Yeob	59	Padang Rengas	The deputy police chief of Padang Rengas (Sgt 97283) was killed in an accident while on his way home after participating in Ops COVID-19
2020-05-03	Cpl	Safwan bin Muhammad Ismail	31	Kajang	Killed by a drunk driver on a Highway when conducting a roadblock. promoted to the rank of Sergeant posthumously
2020-11-01	PC 215005	Nicholester Dadup s/o Unggat	20	Bandar Dato' Onn	
2020-11-24	Cpl 112512	Baharuddin Bin Ramli	54	Senoi Praaq	Cpl 112512 was on duty at the Malaysia-Thailand border post in Padang Besar, Kangar with fellow officer Cpl 148715 Norihan s/o Tari when they were ambushed by ten or thirteen assailants at early morning, believed to be kratom smugglers. In the 3.10 am incident, Cpl 112512 died at the scene while Cpl 148715 was seriously wounded and was taken to the Tuanku Fauziah Hospital. During the gunfight, four assailants were also wounded while the rest retreated across the border. After sweeping the crime scene, the 69 Commando operatives arrested two assailants, a Thai national, identified as Sahamadyusob Talah, 38, and another man was not named while three of them, Sanchai Madsuwan, Arun Madsuwan and Rachen Anumarn, also Thais were subsequently arrested by the Thai police when they were treated at Hat Yai hospital.
2020-12-03	Sgt 130128	Simon Laja	47	12th GOF	
2021-02-14	Cpl 187880	Mohd Syafiq bin Ishak	—	South Seberang Perai	Killed in traffic accident
2021-04-17	PC 212779	Muhammad Iqbal bin Mazlan	20	Timur Laut	Killed in traffic accident
2021-07-11	D/Cpl 162561	Abdul Rahman bin Nordin	—	NCID	D/Cpl 162561 Abdul Rahman bin Nordin who worked at the Bukit Aman Narcotics Crime Investigation Department, died due to serious injuries in a road accident at the intersection of Jalan Tampoi - Jalan Padi Emas 1 traffic lights while conducting intelligence duties around Tampoi, Johor Bahru, Johor. He was promoted to Sergeant posthumously.
2021-07-13	Cpl 130389	Omar Dani bin Ramli	48	North Seberang Perai	Suffering from head bleeding due to high blood pressure, after he was found to suddenly fall down and unconscious while on duty in the afternoon
2021-07-21	Cpl 157610	Hazil Fauzi bin Masli	42	North Seberang Perai	Involved in road accident on the way home after completed roadblock assignment
2021-08-08	Sgt 190315	Mohd Arifah bin Md Yassin	36	Kajang	Died as a result of an accident while chasing an illegal racing suspect in the Street Gangster Operation. Sgt 190315 was promoted to Sergeant Major and PC 207492 was promoted to Lance Corporal posthumously.
2021-08-08	PC 207492	Mohd Muradzi bin Mohd Nawi	26	Kajang	Died as a result of an accident while chasing an illegal racing suspect in the Street Gangster Operation. Sgt 190315 was promoted to Sergeant Major and PC 207492 was promoted to Lance Corporal posthumously.
2021-08-11	Cpl	Vimel A/L Jeevan	—	Jempol	Killed in an accident at Jalan Bahau
2021-09-12	Cpl	Rozlan Shahruddi bin Abd Ajik	35	Penampang	Killed in traffic accident after complete work assignment.
2021-10-07	PC	Lokmanal Hakim Abdullah	30	IPK Terengganu	Killed in traffic accident at Kampung Tasek Berangan, Pasir Mas
2022-01-14	Sgt 130293	Suhaimi bin Zakaria	46	Agong Motorcycle escort	Died in a road accident while on duty in the capital.
2022-07-12	L/Cpl 198418	Arique Shazawie Daud	26	Pasukan Gerakan Khas	He was first admitted to hospital due to a fever when he was on Op Taring assignment at the beginning of June, before his health deteriorated further and was confirmed died due to a bacterial infection in the brain on 12 July 2022 at 4.39 pm.
2022-08-30	PC S/24889	Syaiful Aizuddin Abd Halim	31	Bukit Sentosa	Killed in traffic accident at KM35 of Jalan Kuala Lumpur-Ipoh near Serendah
2023-01-20	Sgt 151843	Yahaya Bin Ahmad	40	IPD Sik	Killed in traffic accident at Kampung Sungai Senam
2023-02-05	Insp G/26180	Chong Yeong Ren	29	IPD Tumpat	Killed in traffic accident at KM5 of Jalan Palekbang-Tumpat near Wakaf King
2023-02-19	Sgt	Jana a/k Mille	—	GD Bayan Lepas	Suicide after shot himself three times behind the Bayan Lepas Police Station and died at the scene. According Penang Police Chief Dato Suhaily Mohd Zain say nothing another element and classification suicide
2023-06-14	APC	Musyiri Bin Bakar	49	Auxiliary Police	Killed while assisting a driver whose car had broken down on the Sultan Abdul Halim Muadzam Shah Bridge.In a statement on Wednesday (June 14), Jambatan Kedua Sdn Bhd (JKSB) said the deceased Musyiri Bakar, 49, was helping a driver whose car had broken down at KM11.6 island-bound at about 8.30am. A five-tonne lorry which went out of control crashed into a JKSB four-wheel vehicle, which knocked into Musyiri was thrown to the motorcycle lane and hit by a motorcycle was killed on the spot.
2024-01-08	Insp	Kunes Raw a/l Ramachandran	35	IPK Pulau Pinang	An inspector attached with the Serious Crimes Investigations Department (D9) at the Penang police contingent headquarters died from a heart attack after taking part in an oath recital ceremony organised by the State Criminal Investigations Department (CID) here earlier today (Jan 8).
2024-03-07	Sgt 130904	Jonathan A/k Lambet	52	IPD Kapit	Sgt 130904 and PC 217938 were killed when their boat capsized while escorting 35 kilogrammes of explosives for a road construction project in Baleh area.
2024-03-07	PC 217938	Iskandar Zulkarnain Bin Ibrahim	28	IPD Kapit	Sgt 130904 and PC 217938 were killed when their boat capsized while escorting 35 kilogrammes of explosives for a road construction project in Baleh area.
2024-03-23	Cpl 172766	Sathyaj A/L Jeevan	30	IPK Kuala Lumpur	Cpl 172766 was found dead at around 3 am on Saturday(23 march), believed to be the result of beating by a group of men in Taman Impian Indah.Meanwhile, the police have arrested five men and identified several other suspects involved in fatal beating.
2024-05-17	PC 224555	Ahmad Azza Fahmi Bin Azhar	22	Ulu Tiram	The man is believed to be a member of the Jemaah Islamiyah extremist group attack an officers at the Ulu Tiram police station at about 2.30am. PC 224555 manning an enquiry counter was slashed by the suspect and died on the spot before suspect took the officer's gun to shoot dead a PC 227009 who came to check on the commotion. Another officer, Cpl 178605 Mohd Hasif Bin Roslan, who had just finished their patrol, returned to the police station was shot and wounded before counter-attack the attacker, resulting the attacker dead.
2024-05-17	PC 227009	Muhamad Syafiq Bin Ahmad Said	22	Ulu Tiram	
2024-06-02	L/Cpl 200775	Mohd Zulkifly Bin Rozak	31	General Operations Force	L/Cpl 200775 from General Operations Force (GOF) Platoon 6, Company B, 7th Battalion in Ipoh was undergoing a basic course at the Ulu Kinta GOF Training Centre. He was participating in a cross-country on 30 May when he collapsed. He was first rushed to the Tanjung Rambutan health clinic in an ambulance and later taken to Raja Permaisuri Bainun Hospital. The doctor confirmed the cause of death was due to heatstroke and organ failure while without regaining consciousness on 2 June.
2024-06-21	Cpl 148638	Zeno Bin Gungoh	44	General Operations Force	Cpl 148638 was killed when a police van he was driving was crushed by a fallen tree at Jalan Gelugor, Felda Sahabat 16, Lahad Datu, Sabah.
2025-04-08	Cpl 119628	Francis A/L Aruputham	58	IPK Pulau Pinang	Cpl 119628 accidentally shot himself in the head at the Penang contingent Police headquarters guard post in Georgetown on 8 April afternoon. Penang Police Chief Hazmah Ahmad, in a post on the Penang Police's Facebook page, said he died at 10 April 5.12pm while receiving treatment at the General Intensive Care Unit of Penang Hospital.
2025-05-13	Sgt 144498	Perumal A/L Sugunanathan	44	Federal Reserve Unit	The FRU truck carrying 18 personnel from Unit 5 Sungai Senam collided with a rock-laden lorry at KM15 of Jalan Chikus-Sungai Lampam in Teluk Intan. Eight officers (Sgt 144498, Cpl 158356, Cpl 175697, Cpl 182015, Cpl 191640, Cpl 192419, L/Cpl 212315 and PC 240170) died at the scene, and ninth (Sgt 151074) died while receiving treatment at Teluk Intan Hospital. Perak police chief Datuk Noor Hisam Nordin said the truck which crashed head-on into the police lorry is believed to have suffered a steering malfunction. He said the FRU vehicle, returning to Ipoh after completing duties for the Chitrapournami festival, was struck by the truck transporting rock.
2025-05-13	Sgt 151074	Mohd Roslan Bin Abd Rahim	46	Federal Reserve Unit	
2025-05-13	Cpl 158356	Mohd Pozli Bin Jaudin	41	Federal Reserve Unit	
2025-05-13	Cpl 175697	Nurit Ak Pandak	34	Federal Reserve Unit	
2025-05-13	Cpl 182015	Amiruddin Bin Zabri	38	Federal Reserve Unit	
2025-05-13	Cpl 191640	Mohamad Hilmi Bin Mohd Azlan	38	Federal Reserve Unit	
2025-05-13	Cpl 192419	Akmal Bin Muhamad	35	Federal Reserve Unit	
2025-05-13	L/Cpl 212315	Damarrulan Bin Abdul Latif	33	Federal Reserve Unit	
2025-05-13	PC 240170	Akmal Wafi Bin Annuar	28	Federal Reserve Unit	
2025-06-28	L/Cpl 223223	Muhammad Amirul Aiman Bin Muhammad Othman	24	Traffic Police	L/Cpl 223223 was killed early this morning (28 June) in an accident while on duty during Op Samseng Jalanan.
2025-08-07	Cpl 175405	Mohd Hafizul Izham Bin Mazlan	35	C.I.D	Cpl 175405 was killed after he was rammed by a sports utility vehicle (SUV) driven by robbers who were fleeing midway of robbing a house at Taman Golf. Kedah police chief CP Adzli Abu Shah said Cpl 175405 died at the scene after he was struck by a Lexus SUV with four suspects on board.
2025-08-18	PC 230459	Naim Mullah Bin Mohd Affandi	23	Seremban	PC 230459 was killed after his motorcycle was rammed by a car driven by a man believed to be under the influence of alcohol on Jalan Temiang near Sekolah Kebangsaan Temiang here early this morning.(18 Aug)
2026-01-22	Insp G/26933	Khairil Azhar Bin Kamaruddin	44	VAT 69 Commando	Insp G/26933 died while undergoing dive training in waters off Pulau Mataking in Semporna, Sabah.
2026-05-13	Cpl 171014	Khairil Idzhar Bin Rodzi	36	Sepang	Cpl 171014 was ordered to perform a "double march" punishment at 2pm. At 2:30pm,he suddenly lost consciousness. Cardiopulmonary resuscitation (CPR) was immediately administered while waiting for an ambulance to arrive. The deceased was pronounced dead by a medical officer. The cause of death has yet to be determined pending post-mortem results.
2026-11-17	L/Cpl 224934	Muhammad Shahrul Alif Bin Yaacob	26	Batu Gajah	L/Cpl 224934 was thrown from the vehicle died at the scene and 10 other injured when a police van suffered a tyre blowout, went out control and crashed into the control divider on North-South Expressway.

A woman police officer was also killed in a car crash on her way to duty. This took place in 2020.

== See also ==
- List of American police officers killed in the line of duty
- List of British police officers killed in the line of duty
- List of Gardaí killed in the line of duty
- List of New Zealand police officers killed in the line of duty
- List of Singapore police officers killed in the line of duty
- List of People's Armed Police personnel killed in the line of duty
