= Remp-It =

- Remp-It
- Directed by: Ahmad Idham
- Written by: Farid Kamil
- Produced by: David Teo
- Starring: Farid Kamil; Zul Huzaimy; Cat Farish; Julia Hana; Aqasha
- Distributed by: Metrowealth Pictures
- Release date: August 10, 2006 (Malaysia)
- Running time: 92 minutes
- Country: Malaysia
- Language: Malay
- Budget: MYR 2 Million
- Box office: MYR 4 Million

Remp-It (English: Illegal Street Racer) is a 2006 Malaysian Malay-language action film directed by Ahmad Idham. Starring Farid Kamil who also wrote the screenplay, the film tells the story of illegal motorcycle street racers in Malaysia, known locally as Mat Rempit. The film was released on 10 August 2006.

Although Remp-It faced controversy in the media for its portrayal of illegal activities, it was passed by the National Censorship Board with no cuts and became the most commercially successful Malay movie in four years. Remp-It was produced by David Teo of Metrowealth Movies Production.

A sequel, Remp-It 2, was released in 2022, with Kamil reprising his role as Madi.

== Synopsis ==
The story is about a Mat Rempit named Madi who works as a dispatch boy by day and street racer by night. As a Mat Rempit, his activities at night include street racing, performing various stunts and annoying other motorists.

Madi has a girlfriend named Ieka who asks him to marry her after each time they have sex. But Madi only focuses on collecting his money to buy a Yamaha 125Z, since he only owns a modified Honda EX-5 which is not very powerful enough for street racing. Madi also has a best friend named Macha who gives him information about each street race that Madi is to take part in. After paying for the motorcycle in cash, Madi and Macha modify it heavily and tune it to the maximum.

After winning many street races, a challenger named Spark comes along with his gang to challenge Madi for a pink slip race (i.e. the loser has to give his vehicle to the winner). Madi loses the race, and he is supposed to give away his Yamaha 125Z to Spark as promised, but Madi instead decides to run away with Spark's Yamaha TZM 150. However, Spark and his gang managed to chase him and beat him severely. Madi is severely injured and his right leg is fractured by Spark during the fight. What's worse, his motorcycle has been destroyed by Spark and his gangs. Ieka sees the incident and turns to Spark and his gang.

Six months later, Madi began working as a mechanic in a motorcycle workshop. One day, an underling of Spark's comes to the workshop and is beaten by Madi. After beating him, Madi asks Spark's underling for a one-make rematch race with the Yamaha RX-Z. Then Macha meets Madi at the workshop, brings him to Wazi Abdul Hamid and asks for his Yamaha RX-Z. With the second-hand motorcycle bought from Wazi, Madi begins modifying and practicing with the bike once he has fully recovered.

The time for the final showdown arrives. Madi, Spark and several other Mat Rempits races along Shah Alam Expressway. Some of the Mat Rempits crash at a toll plaza while others crash at the motorcycle lane along the expressway, leaving only Madi and Spark. After a fierce challenge along the Shah Alam Expressway, Spark plays a cheap shot - he kicks Madi, causing him to skid under a lorry and hit his head on a road barrier. Spark, however, escapes.

The movie ends here, but during the end credits, it is revealed that Spark has finally been arrested and jailed by the police. Meanwhile, Macha quit being a Mat Rempit and married Ieka as a result of the tragedy.

== Cast ==
- Madi (Cast: Farid Kamil) - The protagonist of the story. A famous Mat Rempit who lost to Spark in a street race and prepares for a payback during the final race at Shah Alam Expressway.
- Spark (Cast: Zul Huzaimy) - Another famous Mat Rempit and Madi's main arch-enemy. After he wins against Madi, he beats up Madi severely and burns down Madi's Yamaha Y125Z when Madi decides to run away when he has lost the race.
- Macha (Cast: Cat Farish) - Madi's best friend and another Mat Rempit. His name means "dude" in Tamil slang.
- Ieka (Cast: Julia Hana) - A prostitute (bohsia) who at first appears as Madi's girlfriend but later turns to Spark's gang.
- Rizzo (Cast: Aqasha) - An old friend of Macha and a member of Spark's TZM crew. However, he does not race in the movie but prefers to convoy. Rizzo always tries to make a move on Ieka.

== Featured motorcycles ==
- Honda EX-5 - Madi's first motorcycle that he modified with a front disc brake.
- Yamaha 125Z - Madi's second motorcycle, later destroyed by Spark.
- Yamaha RX-Z - Madi's third motorcycle, used in the final race along Shah Alam Expressway.
- Yamaha TZM150 - Used by Spark and his henchmen.
- Suzuki GSX-R1000 - Used by Wazi Abdul Hamid.

== Special appearance ==
- David Teo (producer) and Ahmad Idham (director) both appeared as the motorcycle shop owner and the mechanic respectively at the motorcycle shop where Madi buys his Yamaha Y125Z.
- A Malaysian professional motorcycle racer, Wazi Abdul Hamid made a special appearance as the owner of a Yamaha RX-Z who sold his bike to Madi. In addition, many former Mat Rempits were involved for the stunts in the movie.

== See also ==
- Mat Rempit
- Street racing
- Yamaha Y125Z
