= Wazi Abdul Hamid =

Malaysian motorcycle racer

Wazi Abdul Hamid (born 1971) is a veteran motorcycle cub prix rider from Malaysia, winning the 1996 125 cc. Underbone championship. He retired from the motorcycle racing industry in December 2006 and recently, he opened a pocket bike racing course in Taman Desa near Desa Waterpark in Kuala Lumpur together with Shahrol Yuzy. The racing course is known as Yuzywazi Race Course.

== Career highlights ==
=== 2000s ===
- 2000 8th Overall - Malaysian Cub Prix Championship (Expert)
  - 3rd Overall - FIM Asia Road Racing Championship (Underbone 110cc)
- 2001 9th Overall - Malaysian Cub Prix Championship (Expert)
  - 2nd Overall - FIM Asia Road Racing Championship (Underbone 110cc)
- 2002 8th Overall - Malaysian Cub Prix Championship (Expert)
  - 3rd Overall - FIM Asia Road Racing Championship (Underbone 125cc)
- 2003 2nd Overall - Malaysian Cub Prix Championship (Expert)
  - 2nd Overall - FIM Asia Road Racing Championship (Underbone 125cc)
- 2004 8th Overall - Malaysian Cub Prix Championship (Expert)
  - 3rd Overall - FIM Asia Road Racing Championship (Underbone 125cc)
- 2005 2nd Overall - Malaysian Cub Prix Championship (Expert)

=== 1990s ===
- 1994 2nd Overall - Malaysian Cub Prix Championship (Novice)
- 1995 2nd Overall - Malaysian Cub Prix Championship (Expert)
- 1996 CHAMPION - Malaysian Cub Prix Championship (Expert)
  - 4th Overall - Asia Pacific Road Racing Championship (Underbone 110cc)
- 1997 7th Overall - FIM Asia Road Racing Championship (Series Production 250cc)
- 1998 5th Overall - Malaysian Cub Prix Championship (Expert)
- 1999 5th Overall - Malaysian Cub Prix Championship (Expert)
  - 5th Overall - FIM Asia Road Racing Championship (Underbone 110cc)

== In popular culture ==
Wazi made an appearance in Remp-It (2006) as the original owner of a Yamaha RX-Z which is lent to a Mat Rempit named Madi.
