= Yamaha Motor Company =

Japanese motorcycle manufacturer

Yamaha Motor Co., Ltd.
- Logo used since 2025

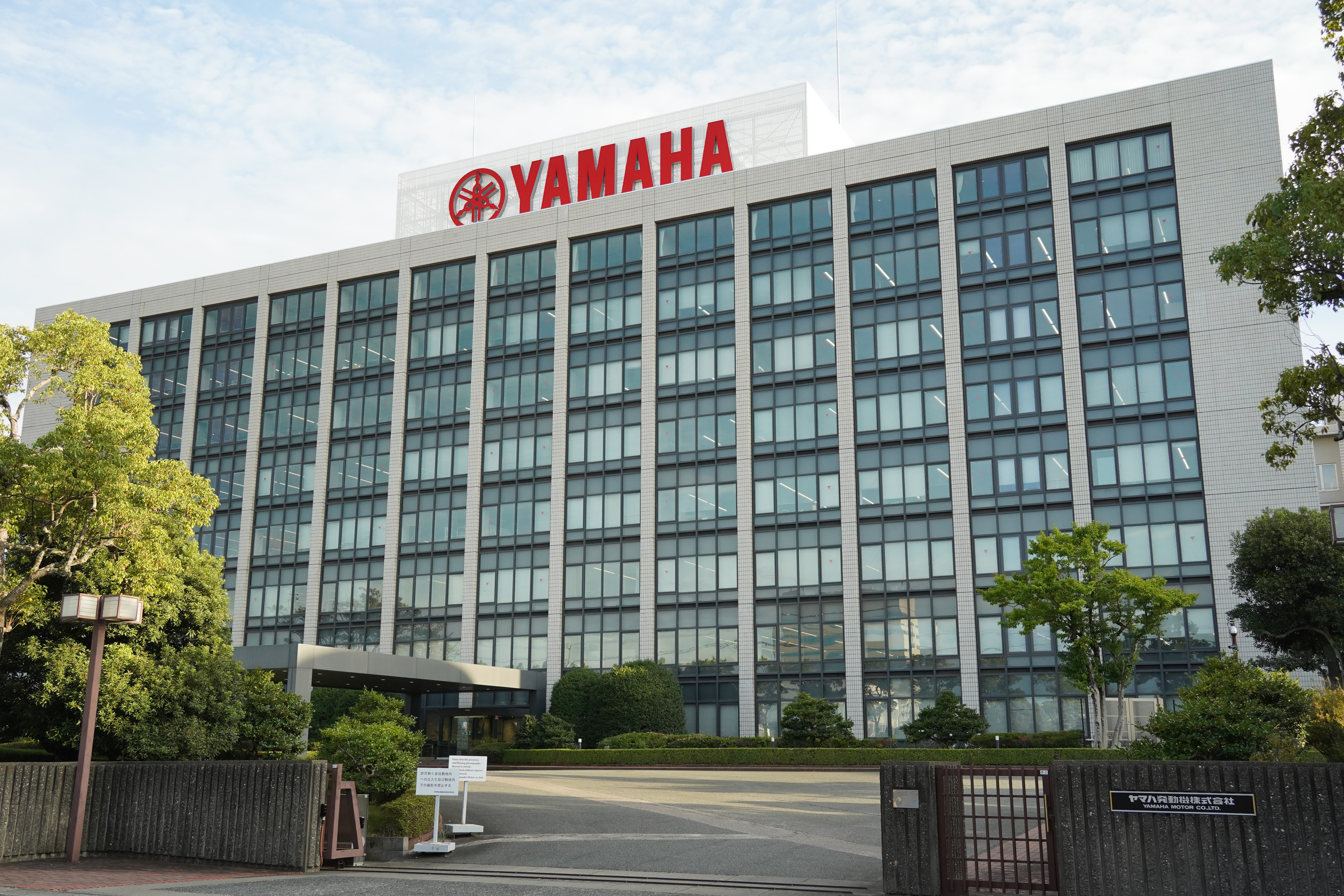
- Headquarters in Iwata, Shizuoka
- Native name: ヤマハ発動機株式会社
- Romanized name: Yamaha Hatsudōki Kabushiki-gaisha
- Type: Public
- Traded as: TYO: 7272
- Industry: Automotive
- Founded: July 1, 1955; 71 years ago
- Founder: Genichi Kawakami
- Headquarters: Iwata, Shizuoka, Japan
- Area served: Worldwide
- Key people: Katsuaki Watanabe (chairman & Director); Motofumi Shitara (president & Representative Director)
- Products: Motorcycles, commuter vehicles & scooters, recreational vehicles, boats, marine engines, small tractors, personal watercraft, electrically power assisted bicycles, automobile engines, golf carts, cycling components
- Revenue: ¥2.414 trillion (2023)
- Owners: The Master Trust Bank of Japan (18.03%); Custody Bank of Japan (5.84%); Yamaha Corporation (4.73%); Toyota Motor Corporation (3.78%); SMBC Nikko Securities (3.37%); (as of December 31, 2023)
- Number of employees: 52,664 (as of December 31, 2014)
- Subsidiaries: MBK; Sugo Co., Ltd.; MTT; MZ
- Website: global.yamaha-motor.com

Yamaha Motor Co., Ltd. (ヤマハ発動機株式会社, Yamaha Hatsudōki Kabushiki gaisha) is a Japanese multinational conglomerate mobility manufacturer that was founded in 1955. The company operates across various industries and manufactures a wide range of motorized products, including motorcycles, motorboats, outboard motors, and semiconductor manufacturing equipment.

The company was established following its separation from Nippon Gakki Co., Ltd. (currently Yamaha Corporation) and is headquartered in Iwata, Shizuoka, Japan. As of 2024, the company operates development, production, and marketing functions through 137 consolidated subsidiaries. Yamaha has been the world's second-largest motorcycle manufacturer, and it is the global leader in water vehicle sales. In addition, Yamaha holds the world's second-largest market share in chip mounters for semiconductor manufacturing equipment.

Led by Genichi Kawakami, the company's founder and first president, Yamaha Motor spun off from musical instrument manufacturer Yamaha Corporation in 1955 and began production of its first product, the YA-1 125 cc motorcycle. It was quickly successful and won the 3rd Mount Fuji Ascent Race in its class.

The company's products include motorcycles, scooters, motorized bicycles, boats, sail boats, personal watercraft, swimming pools, utility boats, fishing boats, outboard motors, 4-wheel ATVs, recreational off-road vehicles, go-kart engines, golf carts, multi-purpose engines, electrical generators, water pumps, automobile engines, surface mounters, intelligent machinery, electrical power units for wheelchairs, and helmets. The company is also involved in the import and sale of various types of products, the development of tourist businesses, and the management of leisure, recreational facilities and related services.

== History ==
=== Parent company ===
Nippon Gakki Co., Ltd (currently Yamaha Corporation) was founded by Torakusu Yamaha in 1887 to manufacture reed organs and pianos and became the largest Japanese manufacturer of musical instruments in the early 20th Century. Yamaha was contracted to manufacture wooden and (later) metal airplane propellers by the Japanese government during World War II. The company struggled in the aftermath of the war, and in the early 1950s, chairman Genichi Kawakami decided to repurpose its underutilized war-time facilities to manufacture small motorcycles for leisure use.

=== Beginnings: 1955 ===
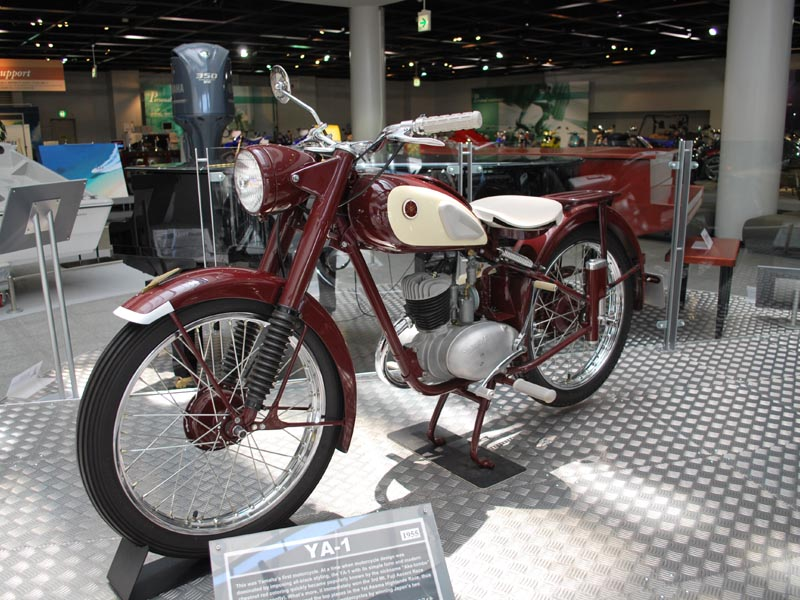
The YA-1, launched in 1955, was Yamaha's first motorcycle

The motorcycle division of Yamaha was spun off in 1955, being incorporated on 1 July 1955 in Japan, and was headed by Genichi Kawakami. Yamaha's initial product was a 125 cc (7.6 cu in) two-stroke, single cylinder motorcycle, the YA-1, which was a copy of the German DKW RT 125. The YA-1 was a competitive success at racing from the beginning, winning not only the 125 cc class in the Mount Fuji Ascent, but also sweeping the podium with first, second and third place in the All Japan Autobike Endurance Road Race that same year. Early success in racing set the tone for Yamaha, as competition in many varieties of motorcycle racing has been a key endeavor of the company throughout its history, often fueled by a strong rivalry with Honda, Suzuki, Kawasaki, and other Japanese manufacturers.

Yamaha began competing internationally in 1956 when they entered the Catalina Grand Prix, again with the YA-1, at which they placed sixth. The YA-1 was followed by the YA-2 of 1957, another 125 cc two stroke, but with significantly improved frame and suspension. The YD-1 of 1957 was a 250 cc two-stroke twin cylinder motorcycle, resembling the YA-2, but with a larger and more powerful motor. A performance version of this bike, the YDS-1 housed the 250 cc two-stroke twin in a double downtube cradle frame and offered the first five-speed transmission in a Japanese motorcycle. This period also saw Yamaha offer its first outboard marine engine.

=== Success and growth in the 1970s ===
By 1963, Yamaha's dedication to both the two-stroke engine and racing paid off with their first victory in international competition, at the Belgian GP, where they won the 250 cc class. Success in sales was even more impressive, and Yamaha set up the first of its international subsidiaries in this period beginning with Thailand in 1964, and the Netherlands in 1968. 1965 saw the release of a 305 cc two-stroke twin, the flagship of the company's lineup. It featured a separate oil supply which directly injected oil into the gasoline prior to combustion (traditionally riders had to pre-mix oil into gasoline together before filling the gas tank on two stroke engines). In 1967 a new larger displacement model was added to the range, the 350 cc two stroke twin R-1.

In 1968, Yamaha launched their first four-stroke motorcycle, the XS-1/650 which was a 650 cc four-stroke twin, a larger and more powerful machine that equaled the displacement and performance of the popular British bikes of the era, such as the Triumph Bonneville and BSA Gold Star. Yamaha continued on with both the two-stroke line and four-stroke twins at a time that other Japanese manufacturers were increasingly moving to four cylinder four-stroke machines, a trend led by Honda in 1969 with the legendary CB750 four-stroke four-cylinder cycle.

=== Two stroke era begins: the 1970s ===
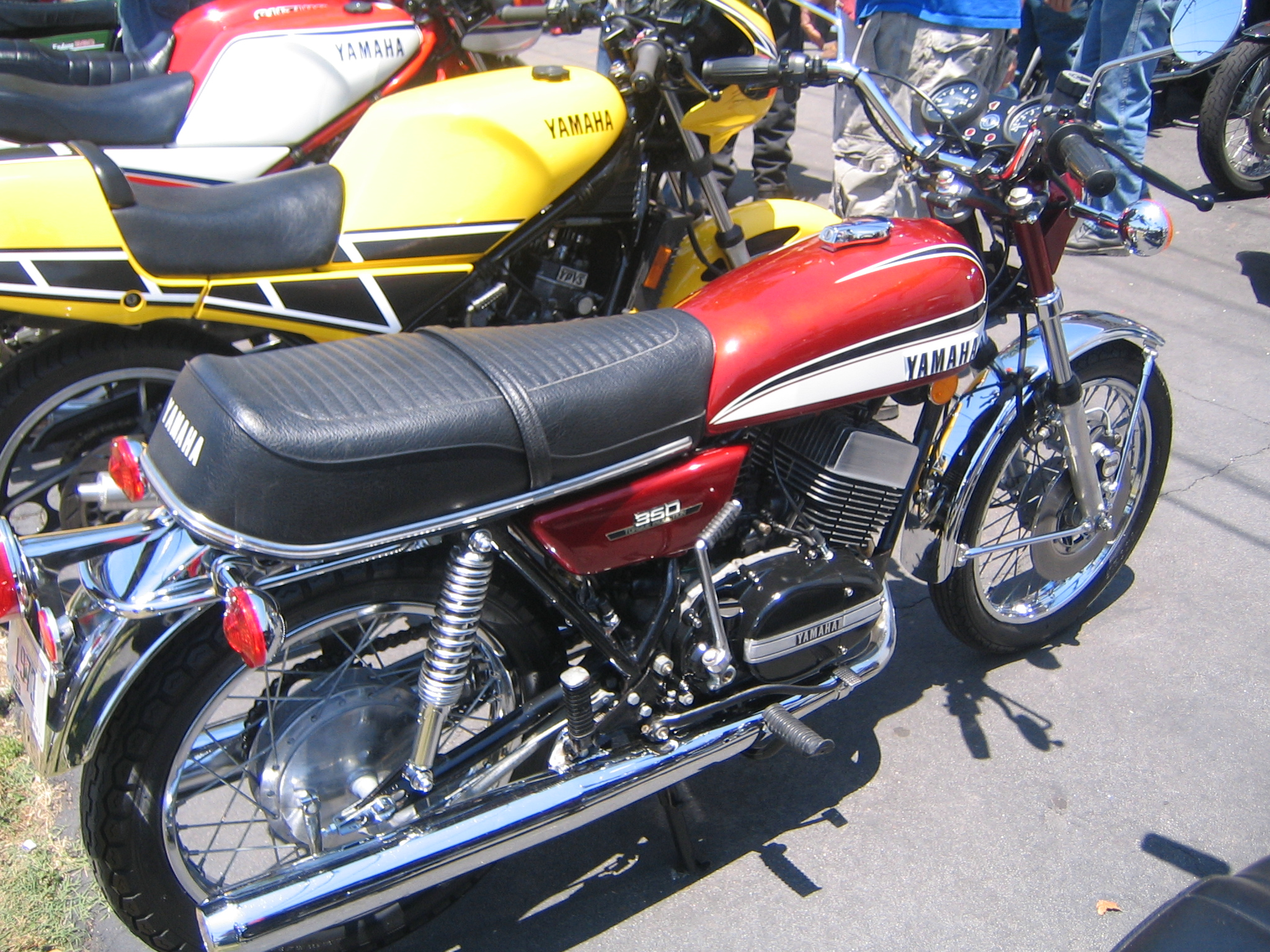
Yamaha RD350

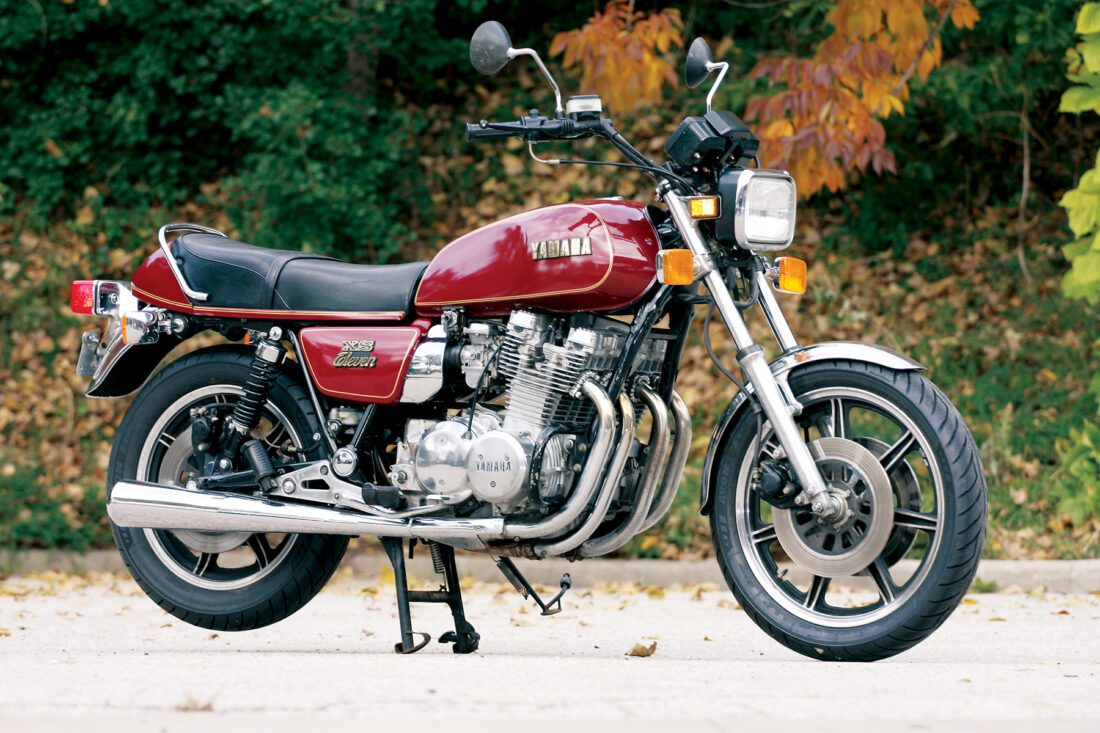
Yamaha XS Eleven

In early 1969, Yamaha added reed-valve induction to its previously piston-ported designs to produce the twin-cylinder RD and single-cylinder RS families, with variants in a number of capacities. There was a persistent, but apocryphal, rumour to the effect that "RD" indicated race developed. In fact, "R" appears to have indicated reed valved, "D" the twin (or double) cylinder models and "S" the single-cylinder models. The RD family would be developed through the 1970s and 1980s, gaining solid wheels, water-cooling, YPVS, and other newer technology 'til they had little in common with the original variants (before being supplanted by the TZR). The RS family was produced for many years in a large number of variants by Yamaha and then Escorts Limited in India without losing its resemblance to its progenitors. In addition to the RD and RS standards, Yamaha also manufactured small standards with stamped steel frames and rotary disc-valved motors such as the Yamaha FS1, and step-through V-50 and V-80 designs. Its Enduro trail bike was replaced by the DT models. Not until 1976 would Yamaha answer the other Japanese brands with a multi-cylinder four stroke of their own. The XS-750 (and later 850) a 750 cc triple cylinder machine with shaft final drive was introduced almost seven years after Honda's breakthrough bike. Yamaha's first four-cylinder model, the XS-1100 followed in 1978, again with shaft drive. Despite being heavier and more touring oriented than its rivals it produced an impressive string of victories in endurance racing.

The 1970s also saw some of the first dedicated off-road bikes for off-road racing and recreation. Yamaha was an early innovator in dirt-bike technology, and introduced the first single-shock rear suspension, the trademarked "Monoshock" of 1973. It appeared in production on the 1974 Yamaha YZ-250, a model which is still in production, making it Yamaha's longest continuous model and name. Yamaha continued racing throughout the 1960s and 1970s with increasing success in several formats. The decade of the 1970s was capped by the XT500 winning the first Paris-Dakar Rally in 1979.

=== 1980s: diversification and innovation ===
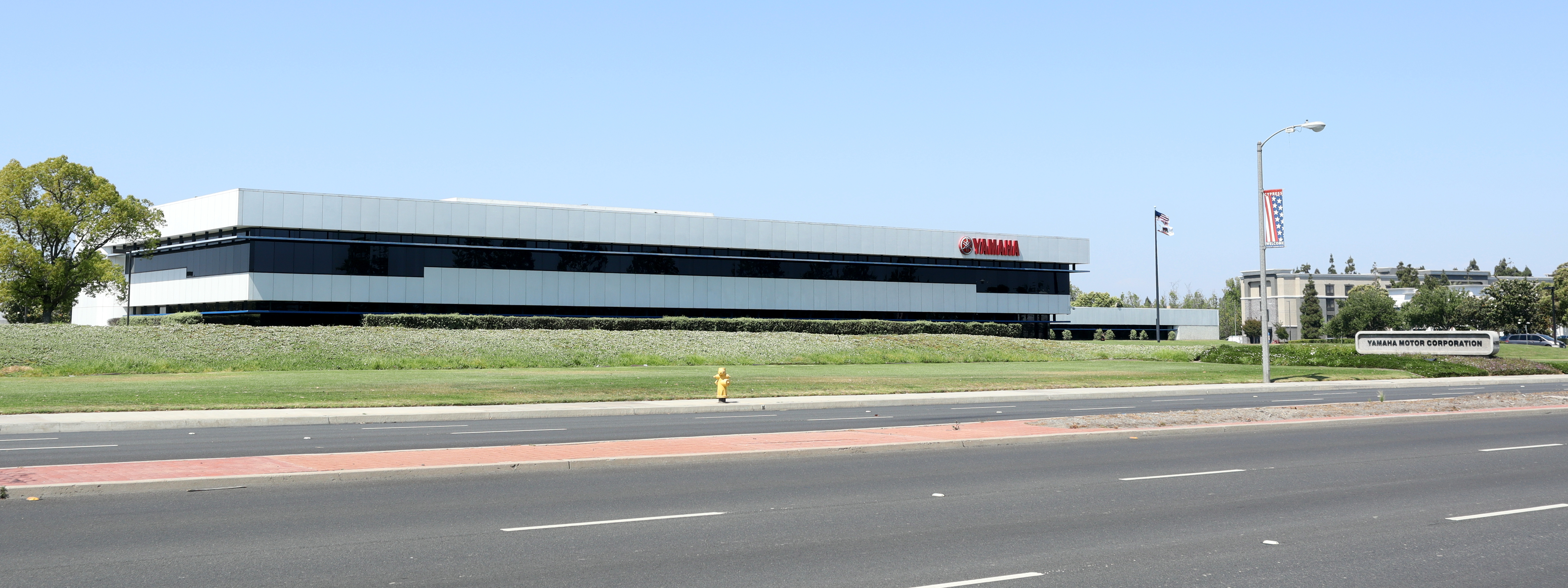
Yamaha Motor's West Coast administrative headquarters in Cypress, California

By 1980 the combination of consumer preference and environmental regulation made four strokes increasingly popular. Suzuki ended production of their GT two stroke series, including the flagship water-cooled two-stroke 750 cc GT-750 in 1977. Kawasaki, who had considerable success throughout the 1970s with their two-stroke triples of 250 cc, 350 cc, 400 cc, 500 cc and 750 cc ended production of road-going two strokes in 1980. Yamaha bucked this trend and continued to refine and sell two-strokes for the street into the 1980s. These bikes were performance oriented, water-cooled twin cylinder machines, designed to achieve excellent performance taking advantage of the lower weight of two strokes. The RZ-250 of 1980 was the progenitor of this series. The RZ-350, the largest displacement model, was a popular hot-rod bike of the 1980s and continued to be sold in some countries into the early 1990s.

Throughout the 1980s the motorcycle industry gradually went from building a few basic but versatile models designed to work well in many roles, to offering many more specialized machines designed to excel in particular niches. These included racing and performance street riding, touring, motocross racing, enduro and recreational off-road riding, and cruising. Yamaha branched out from the relatively small number of UJMs (Universal Japanese Motorcycle) at the start of the decade to a much larger set of offerings in several clearly defined markets at the end of the decade.

The XV750 of 1981 featured an air-cooled V-twin four-stroke engine and cruiser styling, and was one of the first Japanese cruiser style motorcycles. By the end of the 1980s Yamaha had offered dozens of cruiser styled bikes in a variety of displacements and engine configurations. The RZV500 was one of the first "repli-racers", a near copy of Kenny Roberts competition GP bike, it featured a liquid-cooled two-stroke motor of 500 cc displacement in a V4 configuration, along with a perimeter frame and full fairing. A more popular and practical high-performance model for the street was introduced in 1985, the FZ750. It was an innovative 750 cc four-stroke inline four cylinder model. It was the first motorcycle to feature a five-valve cylinder head, something Yamaha became well known for. It also featured a cylinder block canted forward at 45 degrees, and a box-section steel perimeter frame. Production of the FZ continued until 1991.

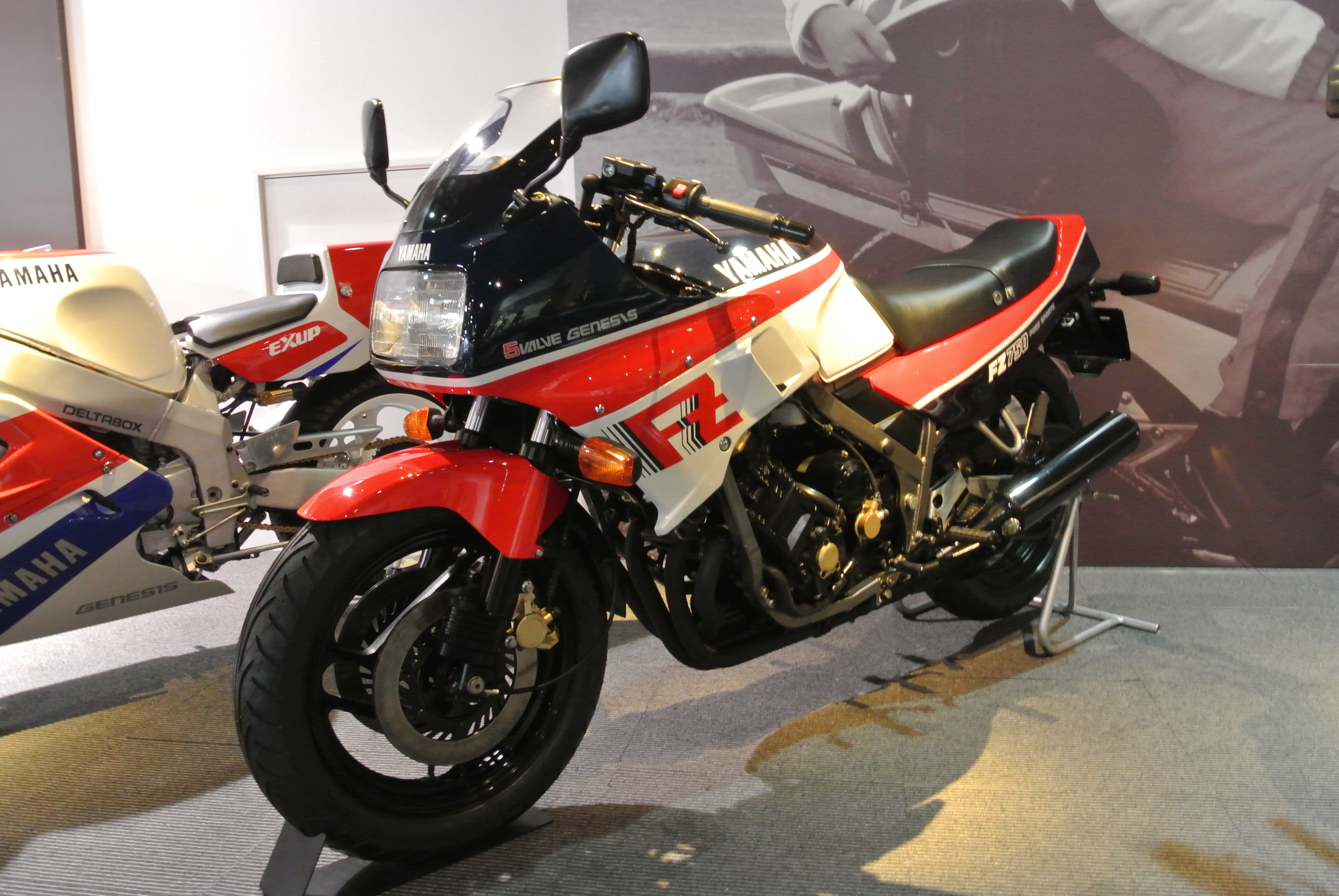
Yamaha FZ750

Another bike that was performance-oriented was the Yamaha RX-Z, introduced in 1985 as a two-stroke naked sport bike, related to the Yamaha RX-135 and Yamaha RD-135, borrowing its chassis and platform. Originally equipped with a five speed transmission and a solid front disc brake rotor with rear drum brakes, it was popular in Malaysia and Singapore. After a few years on the market, the engine was upgraded with the installation of a six-speed transmission, together with a newer instrument panel and handlebar switches, as well as a cross-drilled front disc brake rotor, while the rear remained with the drum brakes. The design was unchanged until it was updated in 2004, with the rear lights being borrowed by the Yamaha Y125Z and a new headlight. It was also installed with a catalytic converter, which reduced its horsepower to 19bhp. However, the maximum torque remained unchanged but the low-end torque was improved compared to the early models. Some owners of the earlier RX-Z motorcycles may have problems during take-off because the engine tends to stall when an inexperienced rider tries to take off in the first gear. However, the problem was resolved in the new model. In Malaysia, this bike was associated with street racers and was featured in many Malay movies. In 2011, after 26 years, it was discontinued.

=== The 1990s: Performance bikes and a spin-off brand ===
In 1998 Yamaha marketed a 1000 cc four cylinder road bike called the YZF 'R1', this model introduced a new style of gearbox design which shortened the overall length of the motor/gearbox case, to allow a more compact unit. This, in turn allowed the motor to be placed in the frame further forward, designed to improve handling in a short wheel-based frame.

In 1995, Yamaha announced the creation of Star Motorcycles, a new brand name for its cruiser series of motorcycles in the American market. In other markets, Star motorcycles are still sold under the Yamaha brand. This was an attempt to create a brand identity more closely aligned with the cruiser market segment, one of the largest and most lucrative in the US. Yamaha reverted to using their own name in 2016.

=== The 2000s: Expansion and consolidation ===
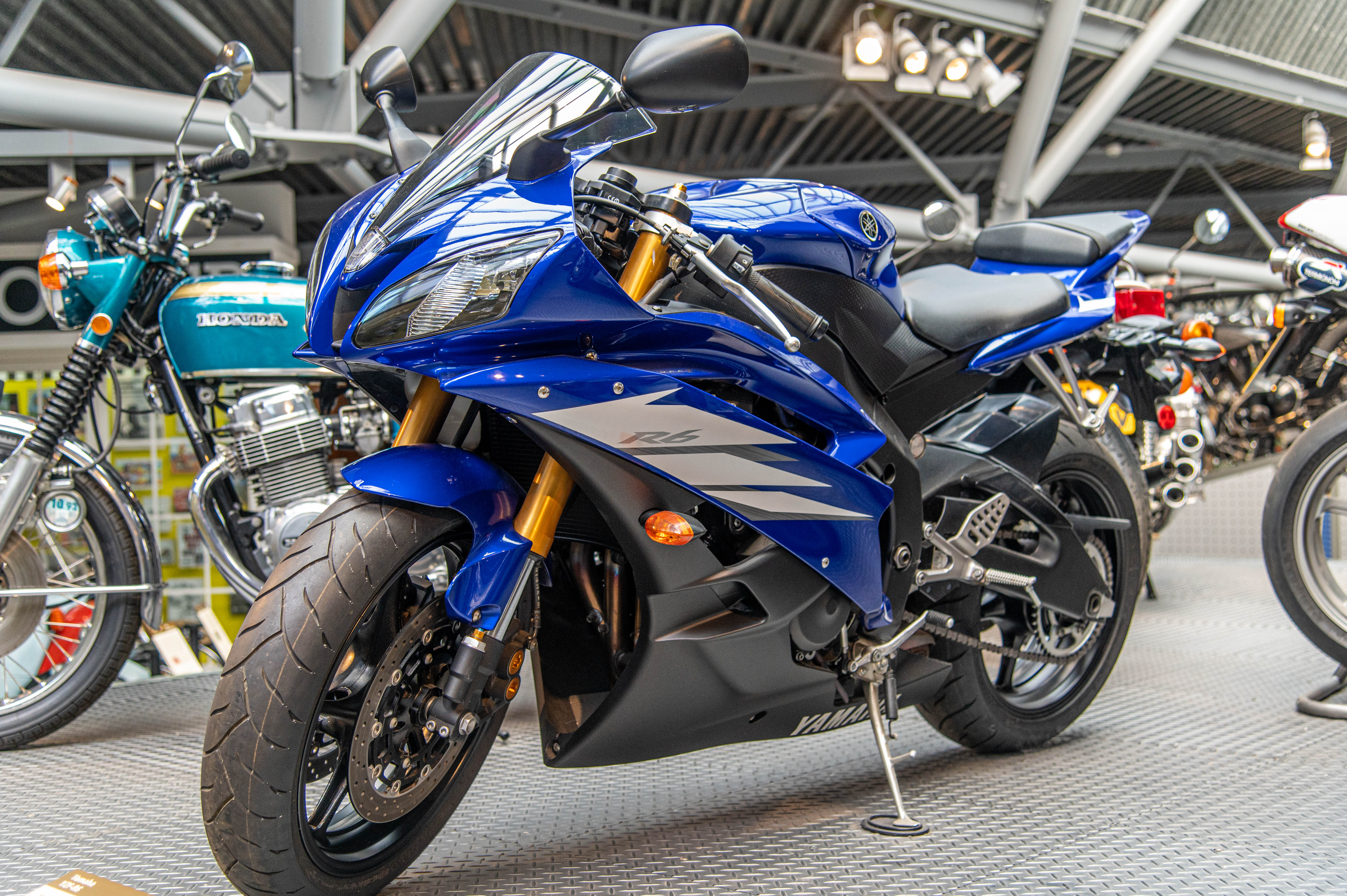
2006 Yamaha YZF-R6

In 2007, Yamaha established the Philippine operations and distributes Yamaha motorcycles under the corporate name of Yamaha Motor Philippines, Inc., one of more than 20 worldwide subsidiaries operating on all continents.

In 2015, Yamaha invested US$150 million in Pakistan to set up a plant at Port Qasim, Karachi. Yamaha purchased small engine maker Subaru Industrial Power Products from Subaru in October 2017. Subaru's engines powered lawnmowers, generators and water pumps and have since been rebranded as Yamaha. Yamaha and Volvo co-developed the B8444S V8 engine for Volvo vehicles from 2005 to 2016.

== Leadership ==
- Genichi Kawakami (1955–1977)
- Hisao Koike (1977–1980)
- Genichi Kawakami (1980–1983)
- Hideto Eguchi (1983–1994)
- Takehiko Hasegawa (1994–2001)
- Itaru Hasegawa (2001–2005)
- Takashi Kajikawa (2005–2009)
- Togami Tsuneji (2009–2010)
- Hiroyuki Yanagi (2010–2017)
- Yoshihiro Hidaka (2017–2024)
- Katsuaki Watanabe (2024–2025)
- Motofumi Shitara (2025–present)

== Motorsport ==
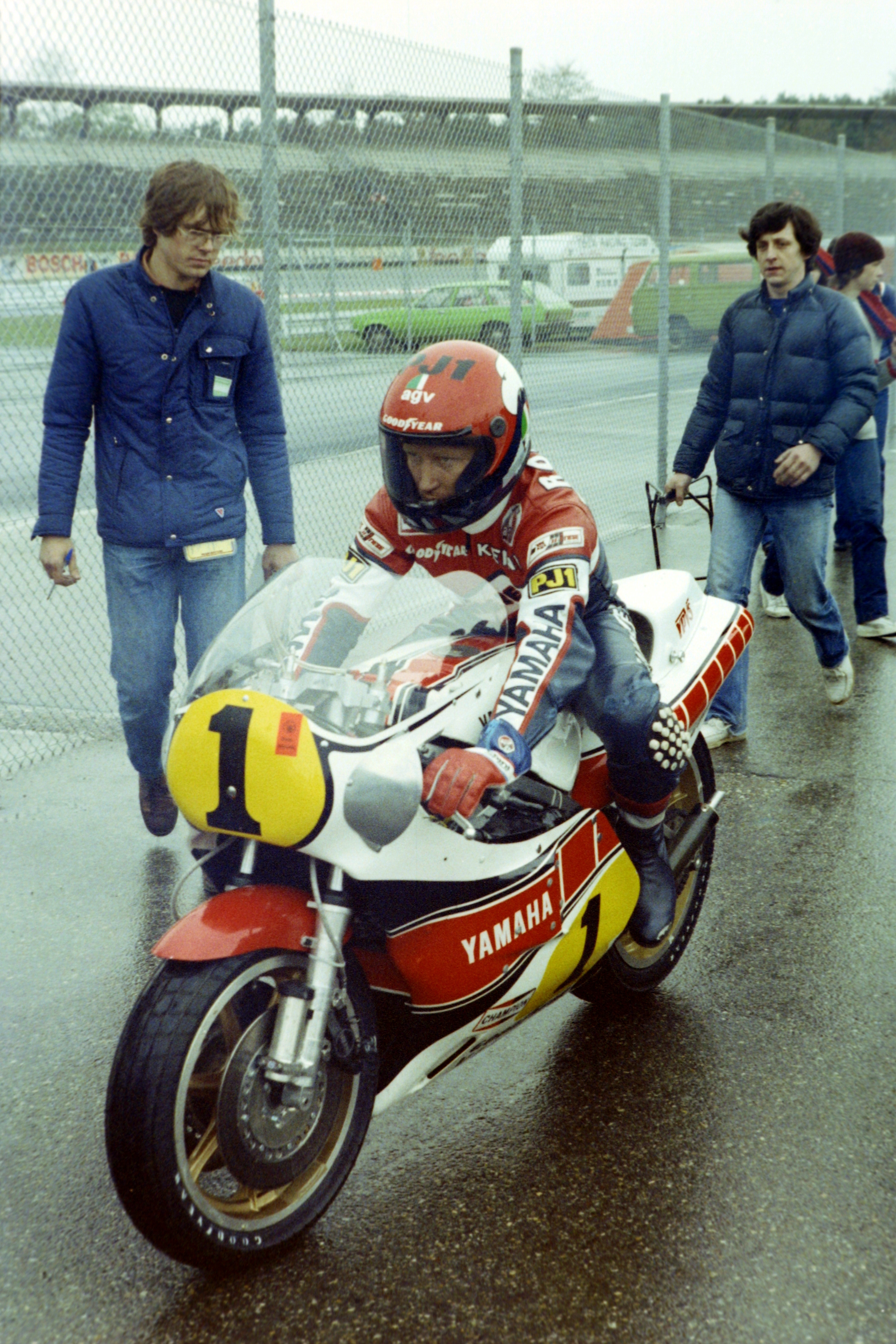
Three-time Grand Championship winner Kenny Roberts at the 1981 German Grand Prix

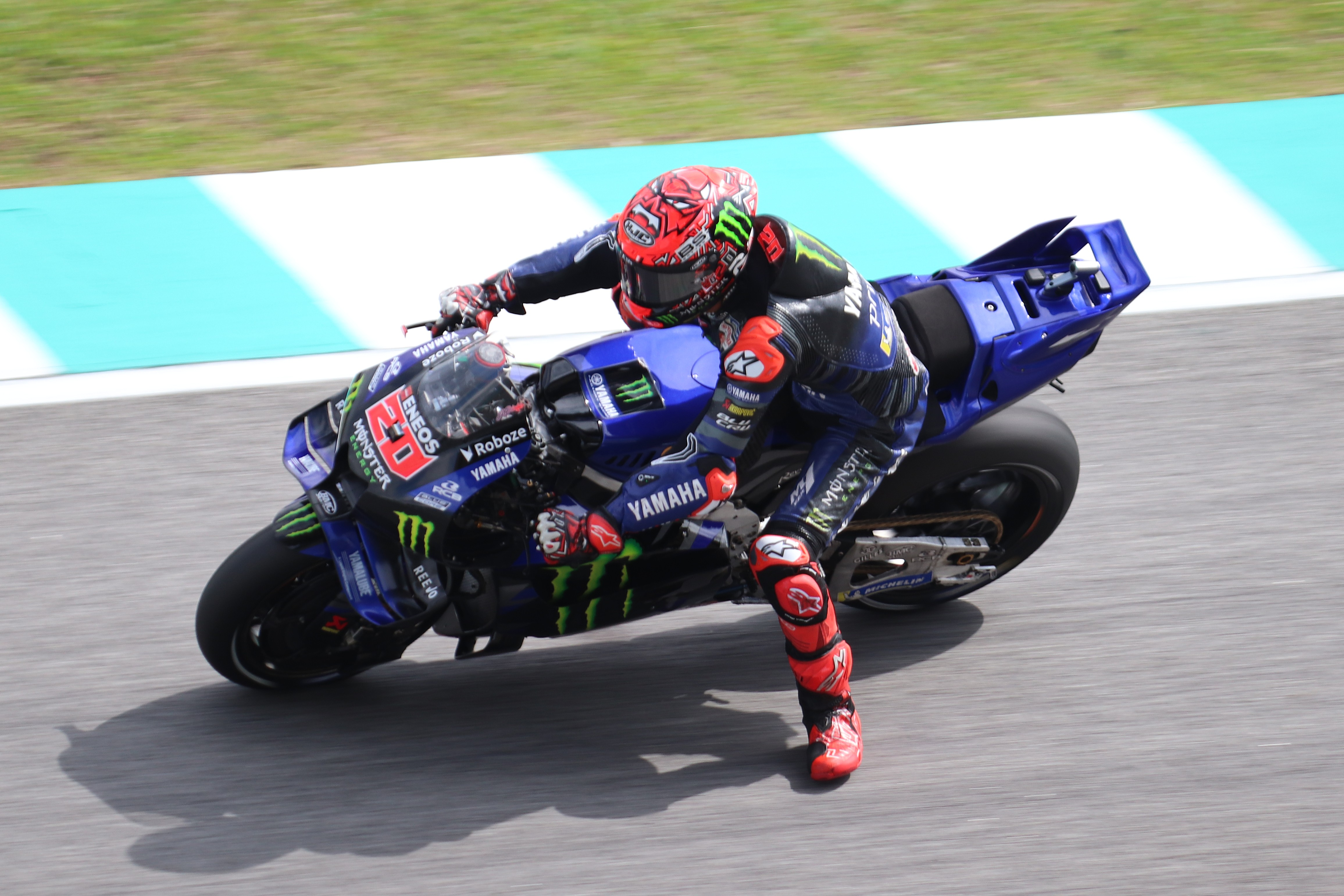
Fabio Quartararo

In motorcycle racing Yamaha has won 39 world championships, including seven in MotoGP and 10 in the preceding 500 cc two-stroke class, and two in World Superbike. In addition Yamaha have recorded 210 victories at the Isle of Man TT and head the list of victories at the Sidecar TT with 40. Past Yamaha riders include: Jarno Saarinen, Giacomo Agostini, Bob Hannah, Heikki Mikkola, Bruce Anstey, Kenny Roberts, Eddie Lawson, Wayne Rainey, Jeremy McGrath, Stefan Merriman, Dave Molyneux, Ian Hutchinson, Phil Read, Chad Reed, Ben Spies, Jorge Lorenzo, and nine-time world champion Valentino Rossi.

The Yamaha YZ450F won the AMA Supercross Championship two years in a row, in 2008 with Chad Reed, and 2009 James Stewart. Yamaha was the first to build a production monoshock motocross bike (1975 for 250 and 400, 1976 for 125) and one of the first to have a water-cooled motocross production bike (1977 in works bikes, 1981 in off-the-shelf bikes). Yamaha's first Motocross competition four-stroke bike, the YZ400F, won the 1998 USA outdoor national Championship with factory rider Doug Henry.

Since 1962, Yamaha made production road racing Grand Prix motorcycles that any licensed road racer could purchase. In 1970, non-factory privateer teams dominated the 250 cc World Championship with Great Britain's Rodney Gould winning the title on a Yamaha TD2.

Yamaha also sponsors several professional ATV riders in several areas of racing, such as cross country racing and motocross. Yamaha has had success in cross country with their YFZ450, ridden by Bill Ballance, winning 9 straight titles since 2000. Yamaha's other major rider, Traci Cecco, has ridden the YFZ450 to 7 titles, with the first in 2000. In ATV motocross, Yamaha has had success with Dustin Nelson and Pat Brown, both who race the YFZ450. Pat Brown's best season was a 3rd place title in 2007, while Nelson has had two 1st place titles in the Yamaha/ITP Quadcross, one in 2006 and the other in 2008.

In 2021, Yamaha has won several competitions, such as British Superbike with Tarran Mackenzie, MotoAmerica with Jake Gagne, MFJ Superbike with Katsuyuki Nakasuga, WorldSSP with Dominique Aegerter, and several other competitions. Their 2022 MotoGP lineup was Fabio Quartararo and Franco Morbidelli, continuing in 2023. The 2022 world superbikes team was Toprak Razgatlıoğlu and Andrea Locatelli, continuing in 2023. Yamaha's Superbike World Championship team since 2016 has been delivered by Crescent Racing.

=== World Superbike ===
Yamaha Superbike
- 2024 name: Pata Yamaha Prometeon WorldSBK
- Base: Shizuoka, Japan
- Team principal/s: Paul Denning, Project Director Team Manager
- Race riders: 55 (Italy) Andrea Locatelli; 97 (Spain) Xavi Vierge
- Motorcycle: Yamaha YZF-R1 (2019→)
- Tyres: Pirelli
- Riders' Championships: 2009 Ben Spies; 2021 Toprak Razgatlıoğlu

The first Yamaha rider to ever win a World Superbike was Ben Spies in 2009. Then in 2021, Toprak Razgatlıoğlu managed to become world champion.

==== By season results ====
(key) (Races in bold indicate pole position; races in italics indicate fastest lap)

Year	Bike	Team	Tyres	No.	Riders	1			2			3			4			5			6			7			8			9			10			11			12			13			Points	RC	Points	TC	Points	MC
Year	Bike	Team	Tyres	No.	Riders	R1	SR	R2	R1	SR	R2	R1	SR	R2	R1	SR	R2	R1	SR	R2	R1	SR	R2	R1	SR	R2	R1	SR	R2	R1	SR	R2	R1	SR	R2	R1	SR	R2	R1	SR	R2	R1	SR	R2	Points	RC	Points	TC	Points	MC
2019	Yamaha YZF-R1	Pata Yamaha WorldSBK Team	P	22	(United Kingdom) Alex Lowes	AUS; 4	AUS; 4	AUS; 5	THA; 3	THA; 3	THA; 3	SPA; 4	SPA; 3	SPA; 5	NED; 4	NED; C	NED; 4	ITA; 7	ITA; 5	ITA; C	SPA; 16	SPA; RET	SPA; 14	ITA; RET	ITA; 2	ITA; 4	GBR; 5	GBR; 6	GBR; 4	USA; 5	USA; 6	USA; 4	POR; 7	POR; 3	POR; 4	FRA; 6	FRA; 6	FRA; 3	ARG; 5	ARG; 5	ARG; 6	QAT; 3	QAT; 3	QAT; 4	341	3rd	668	3rd	451	3rd
2019	Yamaha YZF-R1	Pata Yamaha WorldSBK Team	P	60	(Netherlands) Michael van der Mark	AUS; 5	AUS; 5	AUS; 4	THA; 4	THA; 4	THA; 4	SPA; 6	SPA; 15	SPA; 8	NED; 3	NED; C	NED; 2	ITA; 4	ITA; 4	ITA; C	SPA; 2	SPA; 2	SPA; 1	ITA; DNS	ITA; DNS	ITA; DNS	GBR; 8	GBR; 8	GBR; 8	USA; 7	USA; 10	USA; Ret	POR; 3	POR; 6	POR; 7	FRA; 13	FRA; 3	FRA; 2	ARG; 4	ARG; 6	ARG; 4	QAT; 6	QAT; 6	QAT; 7	327	4th	668	3rd	451	3rd
2020	Yamaha YZF-R1	Pata Yamaha WorldSBK Official Team	P	54	(Turkey) Toprak Razgatlıoğlu	AUS; 1	AUS; 2	AUS; Ret	SPA; 3	SPA; Ret	SPA; 3	POR; 2	POR; 2	POR; 8	SPA; 6	SPA; 7	SPA; 8	SPA; 5	SPA; 7	SPA; 7	SPA; 6	SPA; DNS	SPA; DNS	FRA; 6	FRA; 9	FRA; 9	**POR**; 1	**POR**; 1	POR; 3																228	4th	451	3rd	330	3rd
2020	Yamaha YZF-R1	Pata Yamaha WorldSBK Official Team	P	60	(Netherlands) Michael van der Mark	AUS; 4	AUS; 5	AUS; 4	SPA; Ret	SPA; 3	SPA; 7	POR; 3	POR; 7	POR; 3	SPA; 5	SPA; 3	SPA; 6	SPA; 4	SPA; 10	SPA; 6	SPA; 4	SPA; 1	SPA; 2	FRA; 9	FRA; 3	FRA; 5	POR; Ret	POR; 3	POR; 4																221	5th	451	3rd	330	3rd
2021	Yamaha YZF-R1	Pata Yamaha with Brixx WorldSBK	P	54	(Turkey) Toprak Razgatlıoğlu	SPA; 3	SPA; 6	SPA; 6	POR; 2	POR; 2	POR; 3	ITA; 2	ITA; 2	ITA; 1	GBR; 1	GBR; 6	GBR; 1	NED; 3	NED; 3	NED; Ret	CZE; 1	CZE; 1	CZE; 2	SPA; 3	SPA; 3	SPA; 1	FRA; 1	FRA; 2	FRA; 1	SPA; Ret	SPA; 2	SPA; 2	**SPA**; 1	SPA; C	**SPA**; 1	**POR**; 1	**POR**; 6	POR; Ret	ARG; 1	ARG; 1	ARG; 3	**INA**; 2	INA; C	**INA**; 4	564	1st	855	1st	607	1st
2021	Yamaha YZF-R1	Pata Yamaha with Brixx WorldSBK	P	55	(Italy) Andrea Locatelli	SPA; 10	SPA; 12	SPA; 9	POR; 10	POR; 11	POR; 5	ITA; 9	ITA; 9	ITA; 9	GBR; Ret	GBR; 9	GBR; 11	NED; 5	NED; 4	NED; 3	CZE; 3	CZE; 4	CZE; 4	SPA; 4	SPA; 4	SPA; 4	FRA; 3	FRA; 4	FRA; 4	SPA; 12	SPA; Ret	SPA; 5	SPA; 4	SPA; C	SPA; 4	POR; Ret	POR; 4	POR; 3	ARG; 8	ARG; 6	ARG; 7	INA; 4	INA; C	INA; 8	291	4th	855	1st	607	1st
2022	Yamaha YZF-R1	Pata Yamaha with Brixx WorldSBK	P	1	(Turkey) Toprak Razgatlıoğlu	**SPA**; 3	**SPA**; 3	SPA; 3	**NED**; 3	**NED**; 2	NED; Ret	POR; 2	POR; 2	POR; 3	ITA; Ret	ITA; 1	ITA; 2	GBR; 1	GBR; 1	GBR; 1	CZE; 2	CZE; 1	CZE; 1	FRA; 11	FRA; 1	FRA; 1	SPA; 5	SPA; 4	SPA; 3	POR; 1	POR; 1	POR; 2	**ARG**; 15	**ARG**; 1	ARG; 2	**INA**; 1	**INA**; 1	INA; 1	AUS; 2	AUS; 2	AUS; 4				529	2nd	803	2nd	577	2nd
2022	Yamaha YZF-R1	Pata Yamaha with Brixx WorldSBK	P	55	(Italy) Andrea Locatelli	SPA; 5	SPA; 5	SPA; 19	NED; 4	NED; 4	NED; 2	POR; 4	POR; 5	POR; 5	ITA; 6	ITA; 6	ITA; 6	GBR; 10	GBR; 8	GBR; 8	CZE; 6	CZE; 6	CZE; 6	FRA; 7	FRA; 10	FRA; 7	SPA; 9	SPA; 21	SPA; 16	POR; 6	POR; 7	POR; 6	ARG; 8	ARG; 10	ARG; 8	INA; 4	INA; 3	INA; 4	AUS; 4	AUS; 5	AUS; 5				274	5th	803	2nd	577	2nd
2023	Yamaha YZF-R1	Pata Yamaha Prometeon WorldSBK	P	54	(Turkey) Toprak Razgatlıoğlu	**AUS**; 3	**AUS**; 3	AUS; Ret	**INA**; 2	**INA**; 1	INA; 2	NED; 3	NED; 3	NED; 2	SPA; 2	SPA; 2	SPA; 2	ITA; 3	ITA; 2	ITA; 2	GBR; 2	GBR; 1	GBR; 2	**ITA**; 2	**ITA**; 1	ITA; 1	**CZE**; 2	**CZE**; 1	CZE; Ret	FRA; 1	FRA; 1	FRA; 2	SPA; 2	SPA; 3	SPA; 2	POR; 2	POR; 2	POR; 2	SPA; 2	SPA; 4	SPA; 2				552	2nd	879	2nd	581	2nd
2023	Yamaha YZF-R1	Pata Yamaha Prometeon WorldSBK	P	55	(Italy) Andrea Locatelli	AUS; 4	AUS; 5	AUS; 3	INA; 3	INA; 2	INA; 5	NED; 4	NED; 5	NED; 3	SPA; 4	SPA; 3	SPA; 7	ITA; 12	ITA; 7	ITA; 6	GBR; 5	GBR; 4	GBR; 8	ITA; 4	ITA; 3	ITA; 4	CZE; 6	CZE; Ret	CZE; 7	FRA; 6	FRA; 4	FRA; 4	SPA; 4	SPA; 4	SPA; Ret	POR; 9	POR; 3	POR; 5	SPA; 3	SPA; 5	SPA; 10				327	4th	879	2nd	581	2nd
2024	Yamaha YZF-R1	Pata Yamaha Prometeon WorldSBK	P	55	(Italy) Andrea Locatelli	AUS; 2	AUS; 2	AUS; Ret	SPA; 5	SPA; 8	SPA; 13	NED; 12	NED; 6	NED; 5	ITA; 4	ITA; 4	ITA; 5	GBR; 6	GBR; 7	GBR; 7	CZE; 7	CZE; 6	CZE; 3	POR; 11	POR; 13	POR; 11	FRA; 8	FRA; Ret	FRA; 9	ITA; 12	ITA; 7	ITA; 9	SPA; 10	SPA; 11	SPA; 9	POR; Ret	POR; 4	POR; Ret	SPA; 3	SPA; 5	SPA; 8				232	7th	377	4th	307	4th
2024	Yamaha YZF-R1	Pata Yamaha Prometeon WorldSBK	P	59	(Italy) Niccolò Canepa	AUS	AUS	AUS	SPA	SPA	SPA	NED	NED	NED	ITA	ITA	ITA	GBR	GBR	GBR	CZE	CZE	CZE	POR	POR	POR	FRA	FRA	FRA	ITA; Ret	ITA; 18	ITA; 19	SPA	SPA	SPA	POR	POR	POR	SPA	SPA	SPA				0	33rd	377	4th	307	4th
2024	Yamaha YZF-R1	Pata Yamaha Prometeon WorldSBK	P	65	(United Kingdom) Jonathan Rea	AUS; 17	AUS; 10	AUS; Ret	SPA; Ret	SPA; 12	SPA; 8	**NED**; 6	**NED**; 5	NED; 19	ITA; Ret	ITA; 8	ITA; 10	GBR; 5	GBR; 3	GBR; 8	CZE; 10	CZE; 8	CZE; 6	POR; 15	POR; 10	POR; 6	FRA; Ret	FRA; DNS	FRA; DNS	ITA	ITA	ITA	SPA; 14	SPA; 12	SPA; 13	POR; 5	POR; 22	POR; 4	SPA; 11	SPA; 11	SPA; 9				127	13th	377	4th	307	4th
2025	Yamaha YZF-R1	PATA Maxus Yamaha WorldSBK	P	20	(Australia) Jason O'Halloran	AUS	AUS	AUS	POR; 17	POR; 20	POR; Ret	NED; 16	NED; 15	NED; 21	ITA	ITA	ITA	CZE	CZE	CZE	EMI	EMI	EMI	GBR	GBR	GBR	HUN	HUN	HUN	FRA	FRA	FRA	ARA	ARA	ARA	POR	POR	POR	SPA	SPA	SPA				0	28th	393	3rd	340	3rd
2025	Yamaha YZF-R1	PATA Maxus Yamaha WorldSBK	P	55	(Italy) Andrea Locatelli	AUS; 7	AUS; 6	AUS; 7	POR; 3	POR; 5	POR; 4	NED; 2	NED; 4	NED; 1	ITA; 18	ITA; 7	ITA; 8	CZE; Ret	CZE; 9	CZE; 9	EMI; 5	EMI; 3	EMI; 4	GBR; 4	GBR; 5	GBR; 4	HUN; 4	HUN; 4	HUN; 5	FRA; 5	FRA; 12	FRA; 9	ARA; 7	ARA; 12	ARA; 7	POR; 4	POR; 4	POR; 5	SPA; 7	SPA; 6	SPA; 4				310	4th	393	3rd	340	3rd
2025	Yamaha YZF-R1	PATA Maxus Yamaha WorldSBK	P	65	(United Kingdom) Jonathan Rea	AUS	AUS	AUS	POR	POR	POR	NED	NED	NED	ITA; 19	ITA; 16	ITA; 18	CZE; 10	CZE; 10	CZE; 13	EMI; 12	EMI; 7	EMI; Ret	GBR; 5	GBR; 6	GBR; 15	HUN; Ret	HUN; 9	HUN; 12	FRA; Ret	FRA; 7	FRA; 6	ARA; 13	ARA; 8	ARA; 5	POR; 6	POR; Ret	POR; 9	SPA; Ret	SPA; Ret	SPA; DNS				83	16th	393	3rd	340	3rd
2026	Yamaha YZF-R1	PATA Maxus Yamaha	P	55	(Italy) Andrea Locatelli	AUS	AUS	AUS	POR	POR	POR	NED	NED	NED	HUN	HUN	HUN	CZE	CZE	CZE	ARA	ARA	ARA	EMI	EMI	EMI	GBR	GBR	GBR	FRA	FRA	FRA	ITA	ITA	ITA	POR	POR	POR	SPA	SPA	SPA									
2026	Yamaha YZF-R1	PATA Maxus Yamaha	P	97	(Spain) Xavi Vierge	AUS	AUS	AUS	POR	POR	POR	NED	NED	NED	HUN	HUN	HUN	CZE	CZE	CZE	ARA	ARA	ARA	EMI	EMI	EMI	GBR	GBR	GBR	FRA	FRA	FRA	ITA	ITA	ITA	POR	POR	POR	SPA	SPA	SPA									

* Season still in progress.

=== Formula One ===
Yamaha as a Formula One engine manufacturer
Formula One World Championship career
- First entry: 1989 Brazilian Grand Prix
- Last entry: 1997 European Grand Prix
- Races entered: 130 (116 starts)
- Chassis: Zakspeed, Brabham, Jordan, Tyrrell, Arrows
- Constructors' Championships: 0
- Drivers' Championships: 0
- Race victories: 0
- Podiums: 2
- Points: 36
- Pole positions: 0
- Fastest laps: 0

Yamaha produced Formula One engines from 1989 to 1997 (with a one-year break in 1990), initially for the Zakspeed team, in 1991 for the Brabham BT60Y, in 1992 for the Jordan 192, from 1993 to 1996 for Tyrrell, and in 1997 for the Arrows A18. The Yamaha engines never won a race (Damon Hill nearly did so at the 1997 Hungarian Grand Prix). Drivers including Damon Hill, Ukyo Katayama, Mark Blundell and Mika Salo scored some acceptable results with Blundell achieving a surprise 3rd place at the 1994 Spanish Grand Prix and Hill with 2nd at the aforementioned 1997 Hungarian Grand Prix. This partly was considered to be due to Yamaha collaborating with the John Judd Engine Organization to create a better and reliable engine. However, there were questions raised as to whether the Yamaha engines used from 1993 to 1997 were just Judd engines with Yamaha branding.

1994 was considered to be Yamaha's most successful year in terms of points accrued. Apart from the podium achieved by Blundell in Spain, the Yamaha engine in the Tyrrell Car achieved 4 fifth place finishes and 1 sixth place finish over the course of the season. However, due to the inconsistency of the engine over the years, they were often unreliable and were usually regarded as not very powerful. The Yamaha engines never secured a fastest lap or pole position despite being on the grid for nearly a decade.

After the conclusion of the 1997 Formula One season, Yamaha decided to pull out of the sport. A possible reason for this was due to a disagreement with Arrows regarding the 1998 engine's identification. Yamaha wished to carry out work on the engine with their engineers, while Arrows wished for their own engineers to work on the engine instead, while still having it badged as a Yamaha engine.

==== Formula One World Championship results ====
(key)

Year	Entrant	Chassis	Engine	Tyres	Drivers	1	2	3	4	5	6	7	8	9	10	11	12	13	14	15	16	17	Points	WCC
1989	West Zakspeed Racing	Zakspeed 891	Yamaha OX88 3.5 V8	P		BRA	SMR	MON	MEX	USA	CAN	FRA	GBR	GER	HUN	BEL	ITA	POR	ESP	JPN	AUS		0	NC
1989	West Zakspeed Racing	Zakspeed 891	Yamaha OX88 3.5 V8	P	(West Germany) Bernd Schneider	Ret	DNPQ	DNPQ	DNPQ	DNPQ	DNPQ	DNPQ	DNPQ	DNPQ	DNPQ	DNPQ	DNPQ	DNPQ	DNPQ	Ret	DNPQ		0	NC
1989	West Zakspeed Racing	Zakspeed 891	Yamaha OX88 3.5 V8	P	(Japan) Aguri Suzuki	DNPQ	DNPQ	DNPQ	DNPQ	DNPQ	DNPQ	DNPQ	DNPQ	DNPQ	DNPQ	DNPQ	DNPQ	DNPQ	DNPQ	DNPQ	DNPQ		0	NC
1991	Brabham	Brabham BT59Y; Brabham BT60Y	Yamaha OX99 3.5 V12	P		USA	BRA	SMR	MON	CAN	MEX	FRA	GBR	GER	HUN	BEL	ITA	POR	ESP	JPN	AUS		3	9th
1991	Brabham	Brabham BT59Y; Brabham BT60Y	Yamaha OX99 3.5 V12	P	(United Kingdom) Martin Brundle	11	12	11	EX	Ret	Ret	Ret	Ret	11	Ret	9	13	12	10	5	DNQ		3	9th
1991	Brabham	Brabham BT59Y; Brabham BT60Y	Yamaha OX99 3.5 V12	P	(United Kingdom) Mark Blundell	Ret	Ret	8	Ret	DNQ	Ret	Ret	Ret	12	Ret	6	12	Ret	Ret	DNPQ	17		3	9th
1992	Sasol Jordan Yamaha	Jordan 192	Yamaha OX99 3.5 V12	G		RSA	MEX	BRA	ESP	SMR	MON	CAN	FRA	GBR	GER	HUN	BEL	ITA	POR	JPN	AUS		1	11th
1992	Sasol Jordan Yamaha	Jordan 192	Yamaha OX99 3.5 V12	G	(Italy) Stefano Modena	DNQ	Ret	Ret	DNQ	Ret	Ret	Ret	Ret	Ret	DNQ	Ret	15	DNQ	13	7	6		1	11th
1992	Sasol Jordan Yamaha	Jordan 192	Yamaha OX99 3.5 V12	G	(Brazil) Maurício Gugelmin	11	Ret	Ret	Ret	7	Ret	Ret	Ret	Ret	15	10	14	Ret	Ret	Ret	Ret		1	11th
1993	Tyrrell	Tyrrell 020C; Tyrrell 021	Yamaha OX10A 3.5 V10	G		RSA	BRA	EUR	SMR	ESP	MON	CAN	FRA	GBR	GER	HUN	BEL	ITA	POR	JPN	AUS		0	NC
1993	Tyrrell	Tyrrell 020C; Tyrrell 021	Yamaha OX10A 3.5 V10	G	(Japan) Ukyo Katayama	Ret	Ret	Ret	Ret	Ret	Ret	17	Ret	13	Ret	10	15	14	Ret	Ret	Ret		0	NC
1993	Tyrrell	Tyrrell 020C; Tyrrell 021	Yamaha OX10A 3.5 V10	G	(Italy) Andrea de Cesaris	Ret	Ret	Ret	Ret	DSQ	10	Ret	15	NC	Ret	11	Ret	13	12	Ret	13		0	NC
1994	Tyrrell	Tyrrell 022	Yamaha OX10B 3.5 V10	G		BRA	PAC	SMR	MON	ESP	CAN	FRA	GBR	GER	HUN	BEL	ITA	POR	EUR	JPN	AUS		13	7th
1994	Tyrrell	Tyrrell 022	Yamaha OX10B 3.5 V10	G	(Japan) Ukyo Katayama	5	Ret	5	Ret	Ret	Ret	Ret	6	Ret	Ret	Ret	Ret	Ret	7	Ret	Ret		13	7th
1994	Tyrrell	Tyrrell 022	Yamaha OX10B 3.5 V10	G	(United Kingdom) Mark Blundell	Ret	Ret	9	Ret	3	10	10	Ret	Ret	5	5	Ret	Ret	13	Ret	Ret		13	7th
1995	Nokia Tyrrell Yamaha	Tyrrell 023	Yamaha OX10C 3.0 V10	G		BRA	ARG	SMR	ESP	MON	CAN	FRA	GBR	GER	HUN	BEL	ITA	POR	EUR	PAC	JPN	AUS	5	8th
1995	Nokia Tyrrell Yamaha	Tyrrell 023	Yamaha OX10C 3.0 V10	G	(Japan) Ukyo Katayama	Ret	8	Ret	Ret	Ret	Ret	Ret	Ret	7	Ret	Ret	10	Ret		14	Ret	Ret	5	8th
1995	Nokia Tyrrell Yamaha	Tyrrell 023	Yamaha OX10C 3.0 V10	G	(Italy) Gabriele Tarquini														14				5	8th
1995	Nokia Tyrrell Yamaha	Tyrrell 023	Yamaha OX10C 3.0 V10	G	(Finland) Mika Salo	7	Ret	Ret	10	Ret	7	15	8	Ret	Ret	8	5	13	10	12	6	5	5	8th
1996	Tyrrell Yamaha	Tyrrell 024	Yamaha OX11A 3.0 V10	G		AUS	BRA	ARG	EUR	SMR	MON	ESP	CAN	FRA	GBR	GER	HUN	BEL	ITA	POR	JPN		5	8th
1996	Tyrrell Yamaha	Tyrrell 024	Yamaha OX11A 3.0 V10	G	(Japan) Ukyo Katayama	11	9	Ret	DSQ	Ret	Ret	Ret	Ret	Ret	Ret	Ret	7	8	10	12	Ret		5	8th
1996	Tyrrell Yamaha	Tyrrell 024	Yamaha OX11A 3.0 V10	G	(Finland) Mika Salo	6	5	Ret	DSQ	Ret	5	DSQ	Ret	10	7	9	Ret	7	Ret	11	Ret		5	8th
1997	Danka Arrows Yamaha	Arrows A18	Yamaha OX11C/D 3.0 V10	B		AUS	BRA	ARG	SMR	MON	ESP	CAN	FRA	GBR	GER	HUN	BEL	ITA	AUT	LUX	JPN	EUR	9	8th
1997	Danka Arrows Yamaha	Arrows A18	Yamaha OX11C/D 3.0 V10	B	(United Kingdom) Damon Hill	DNS	17	Ret	Ret	Ret	Ret	9	12	6	8	2	13	Ret	7	8	12	Ret	9	8th
1997	Danka Arrows Yamaha	Arrows A18	Yamaha OX11C/D 3.0 V10	B	(Brazil) Pedro Diniz	10	Ret	Ret	Ret	Ret	Ret	8	Ret	Ret	Ret	Ret	7	Ret	13	5	13	Ret	9	8th

=== Formula E ===
In March 2024, it was announced Lola Cars will enter Formula E in the 2024–25 season as a powertrain supplier in a technical partnership with Yamaha. A month later, Lola-Yamaha secured Abt Formula E Team as its first powertrain customer for the 2024–25 season, with the team entering the season as Lola Yamaha Abt Formula E Team. Lola later took over Abt's Formula E entrants' licence with Abt continuing to run the team operationally. The team won their first race in Race 2 of the 2026 Shanghai ePrix through Lucas di Grassi. Yamaha will continue to be the technical partner with Lola for the 2026–27 season as the series will use the Formula E Gen4 car. However, the team will compete as Lola Formula E Team following "Lola’s growing capabilities as an independent manufacturer".

== Products ==
=== Overview ===
Yamaha Motor is a diversified company which produces products for industries and consumer market segments:

- Motorcycles: Sport bikes, Star Cruiser bikes, trail bikes, road racers and motocross racers

- All terrain vehicles

- Snowmobiles
- Lawn mowers
- Commuter vehicles, including scooters
- Boats: Powerboats, sailboats (e.g. Yamaha 26, a sailboat produced in the 1970s), utility boats and custom boats
- Marine engines: Outboard motors, electric marine motors, marine diesel engines and stern drives
- Personal watercraft – see WaveRunner
- Electric bicycles
- Automobile engines
- Industrial-use unmanned helicopters
- Golf cars
- Power products: generators, multipurpose engines, water pumps and snow throwers
- Swimming pools, watersliders and pool-related equipment
- Intelligent machinery, including compact industrial robots
- Electric wheelchairs and wheelchair electric drive units
- Yamaha parts and accessories, apparel, cycle helmets and motor oil
- Industrial robots and surface mounters
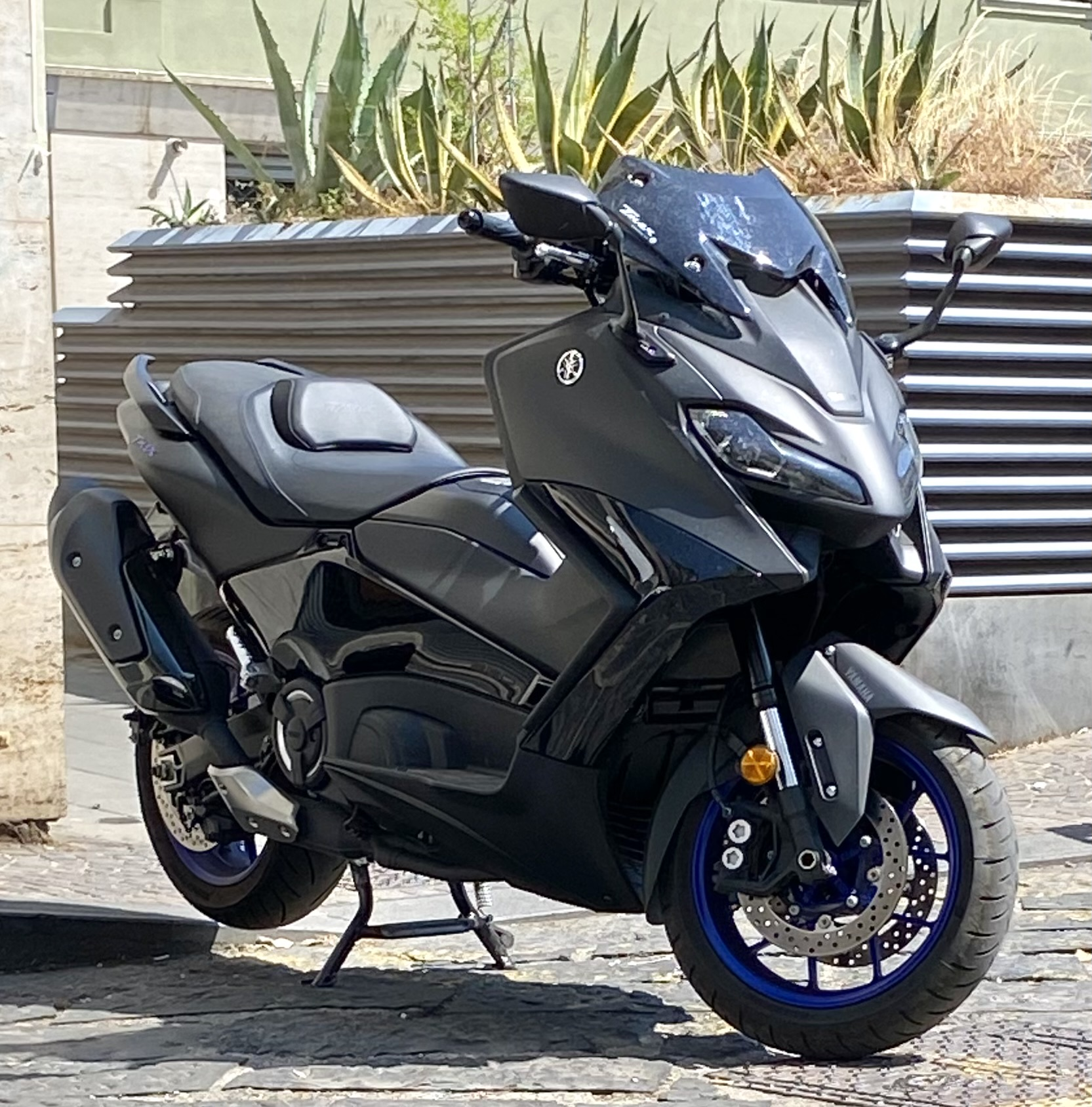
Yamaha TMAX Scooter

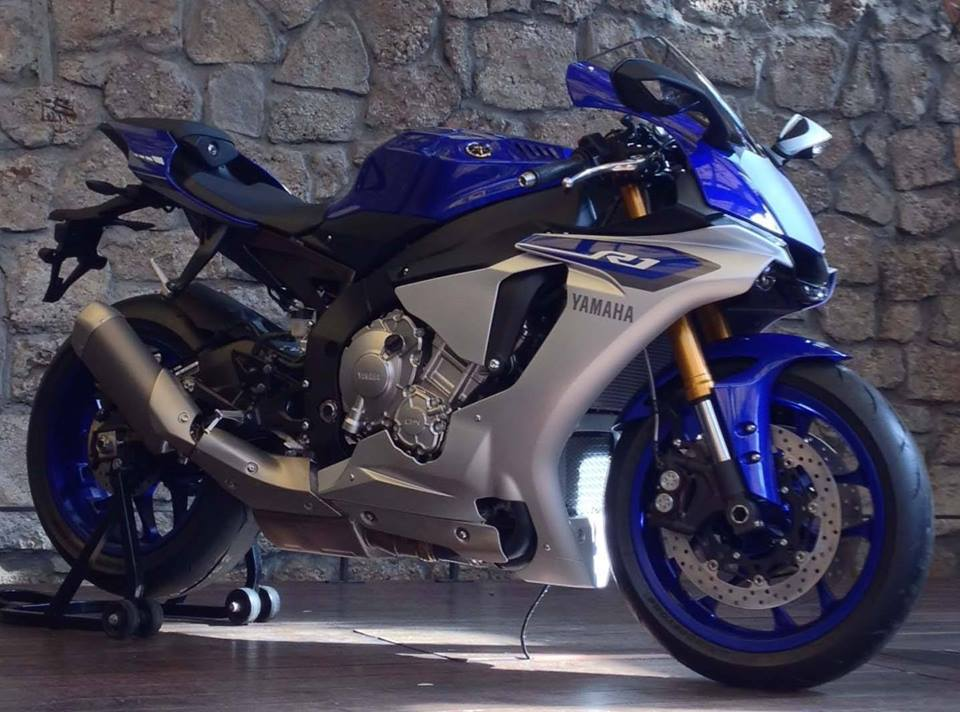
Yamaha YZF-R1 Superbike

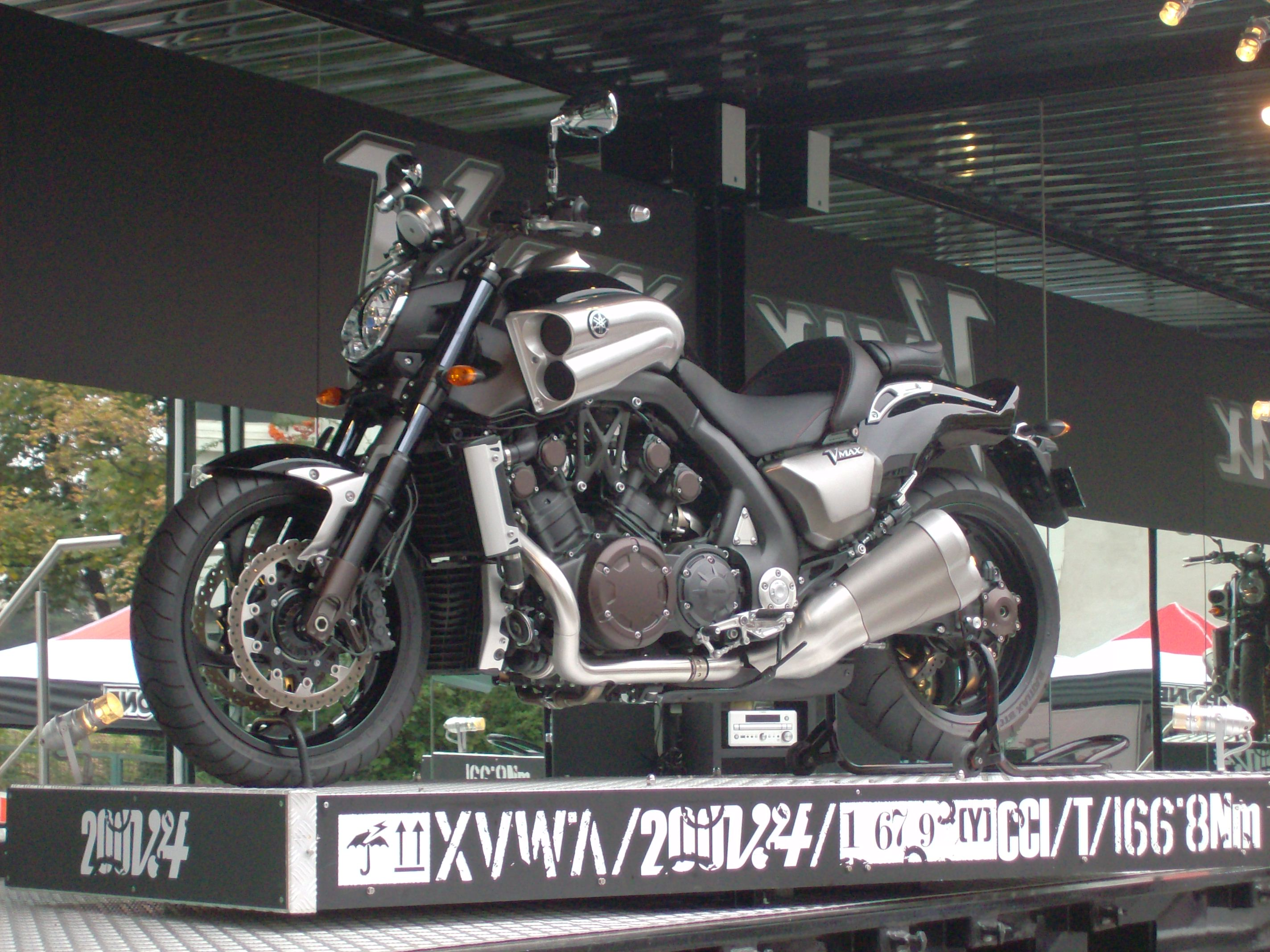
Yamaha VMAX Cruiser

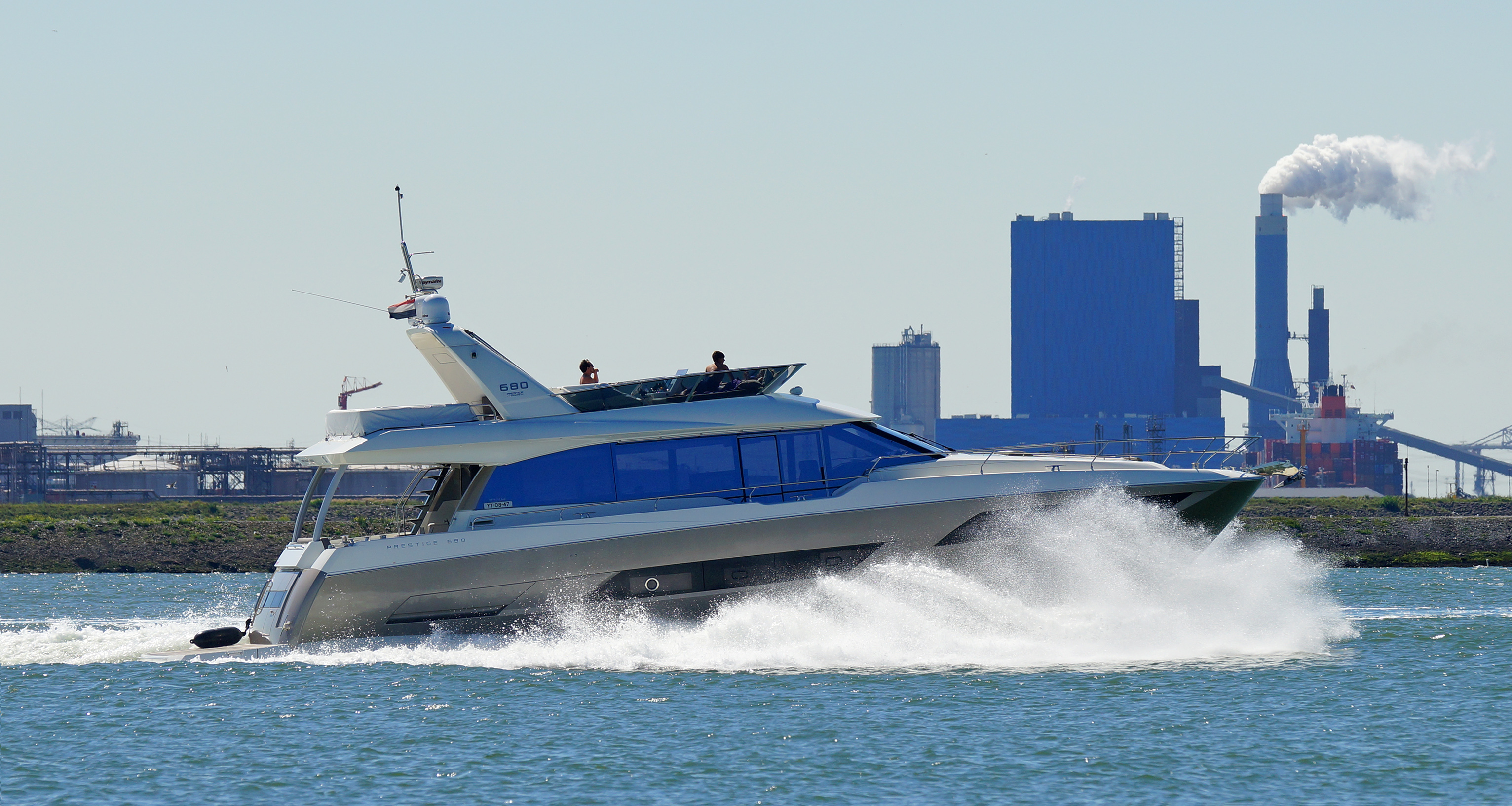
Yamaha PRESTIGE

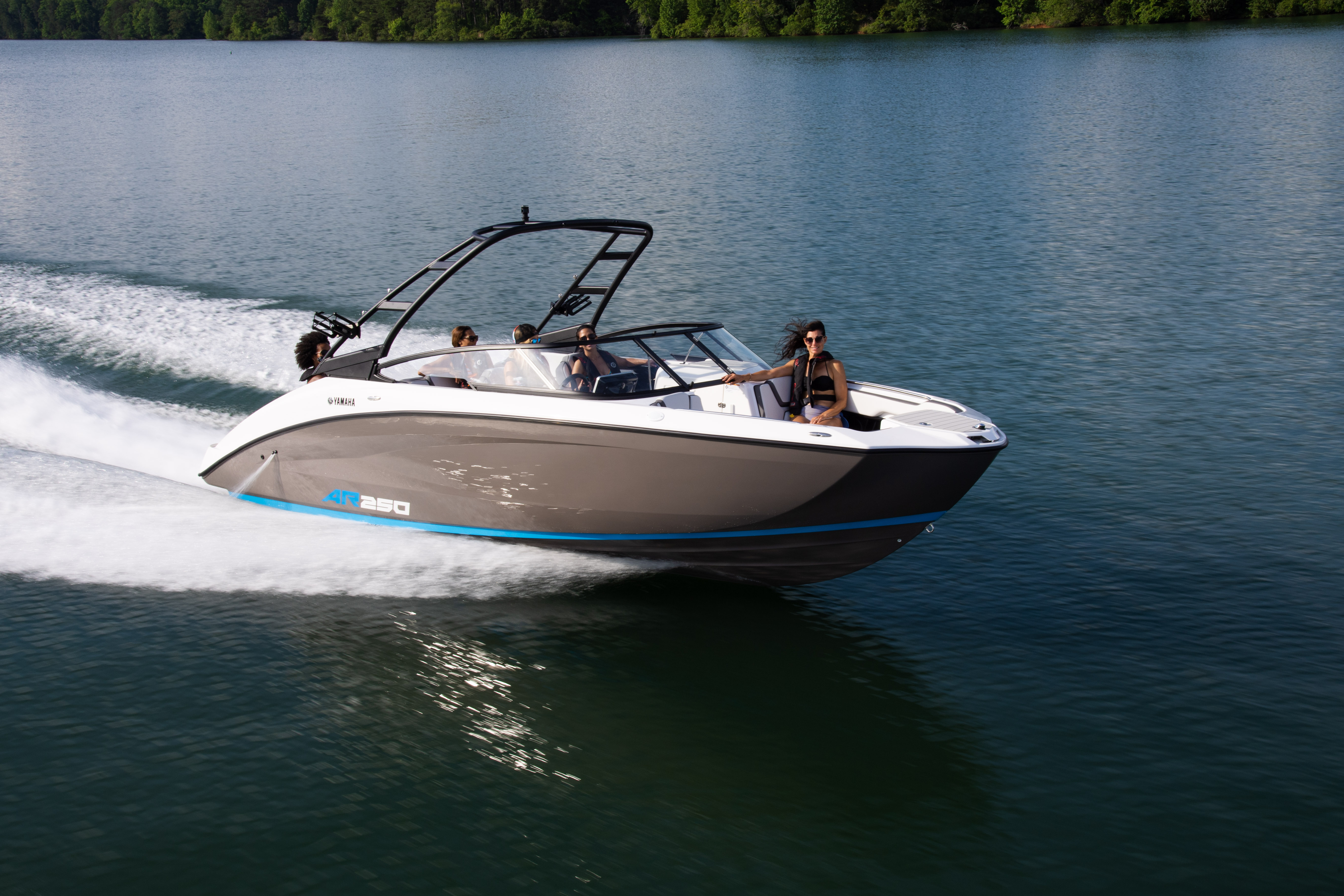
Motorboat AR250

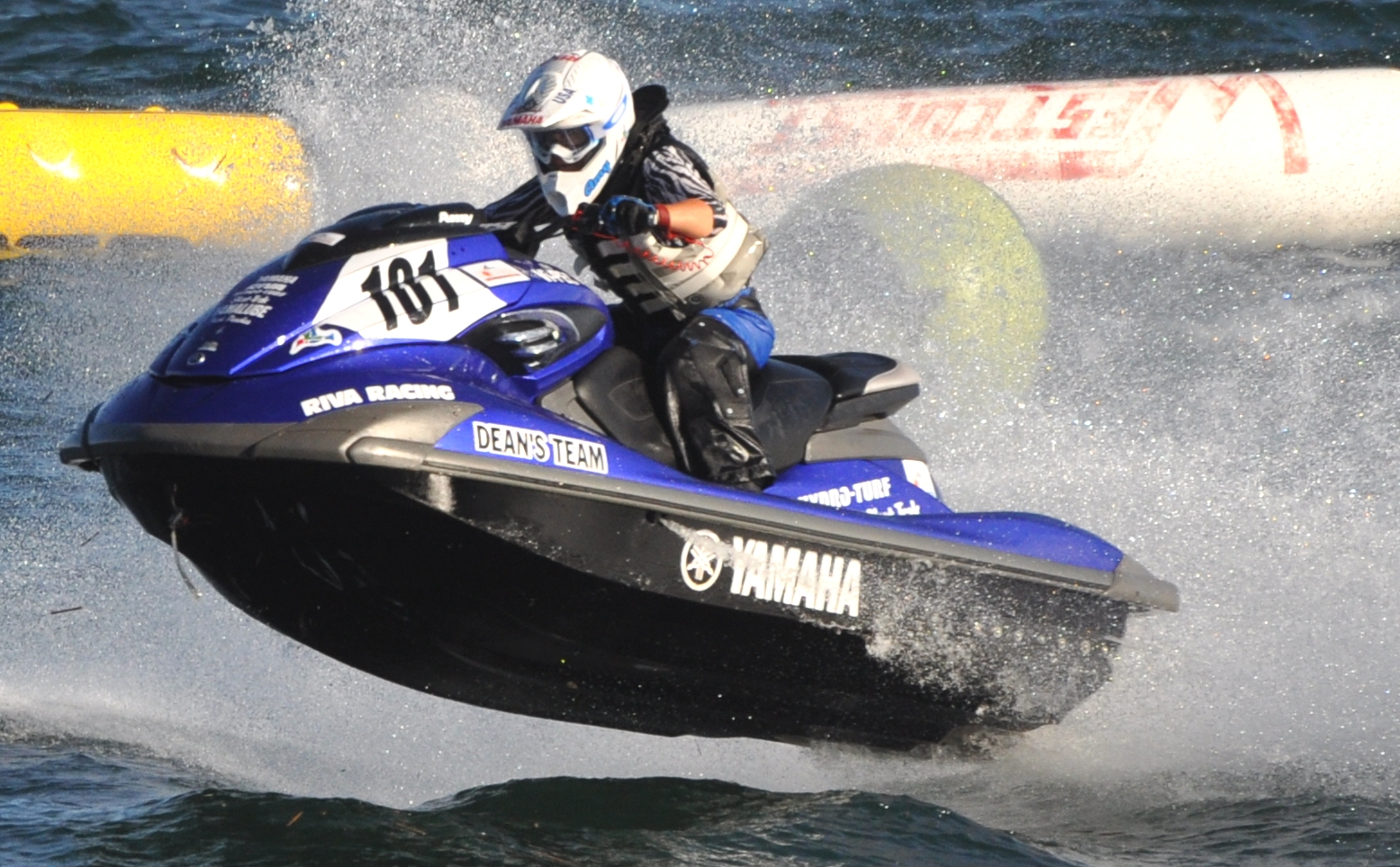
Yamaha Waverunner

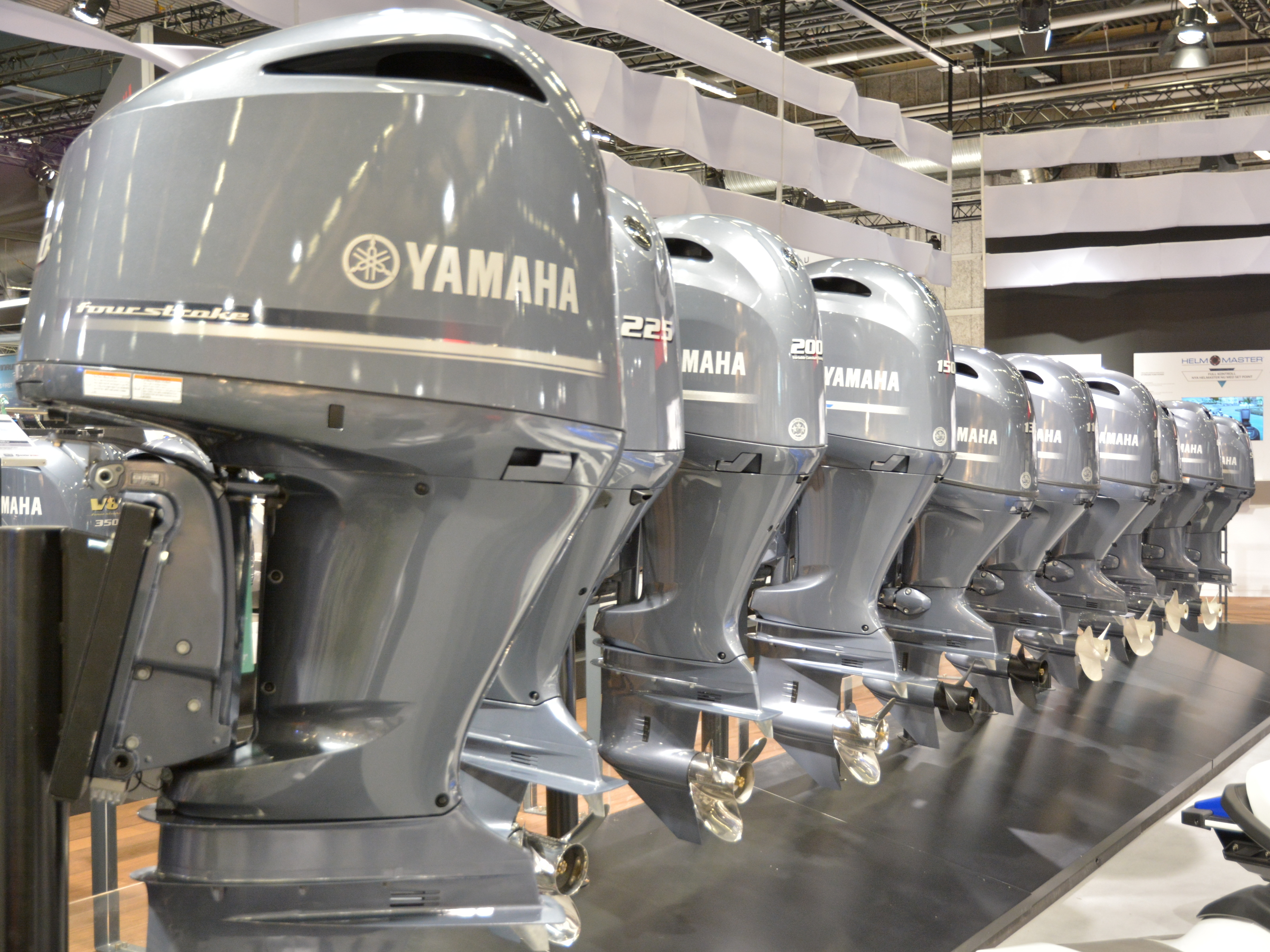
Yamaha Outboard Motor

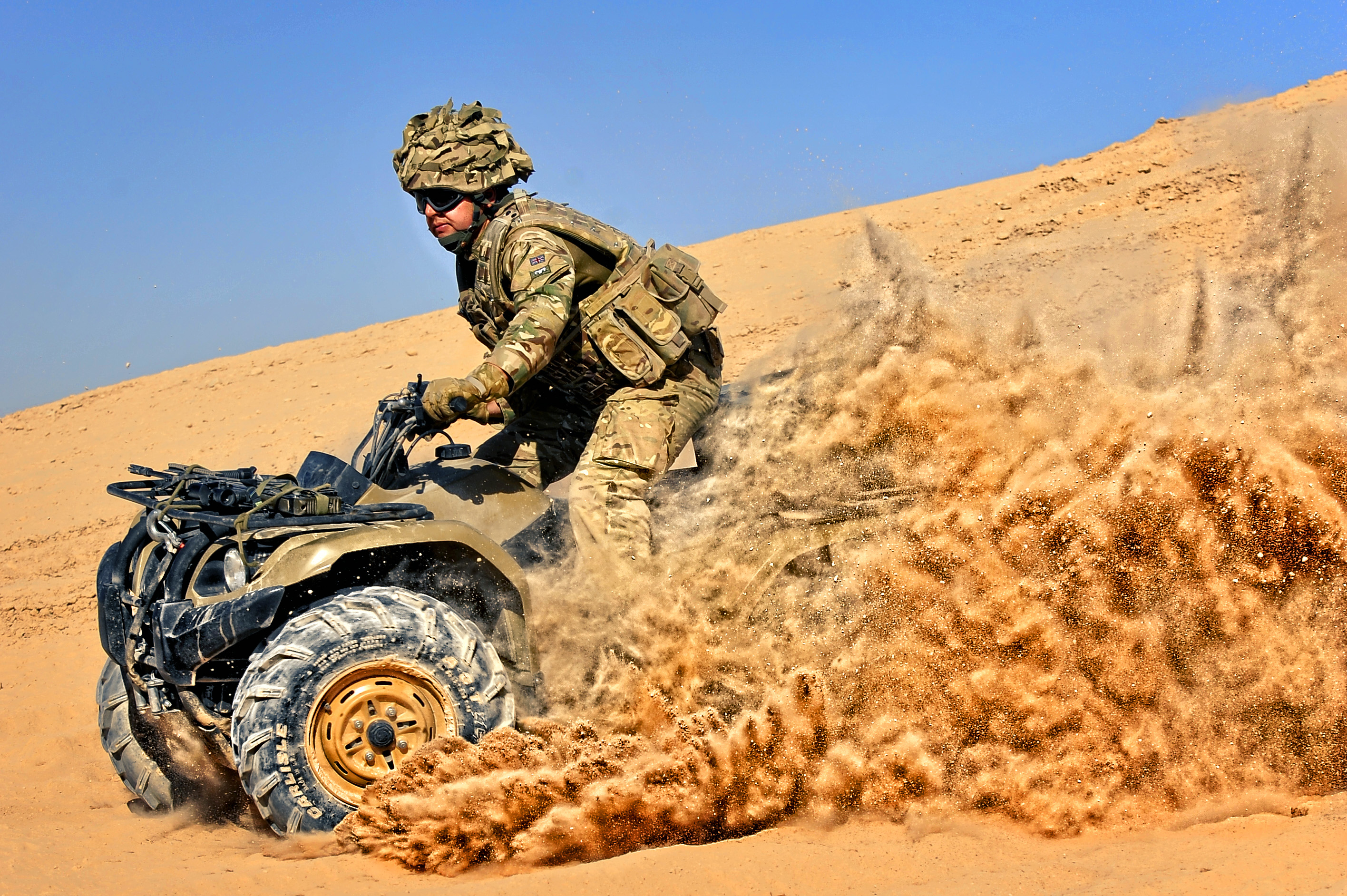
Yamaha Grizzly ATV

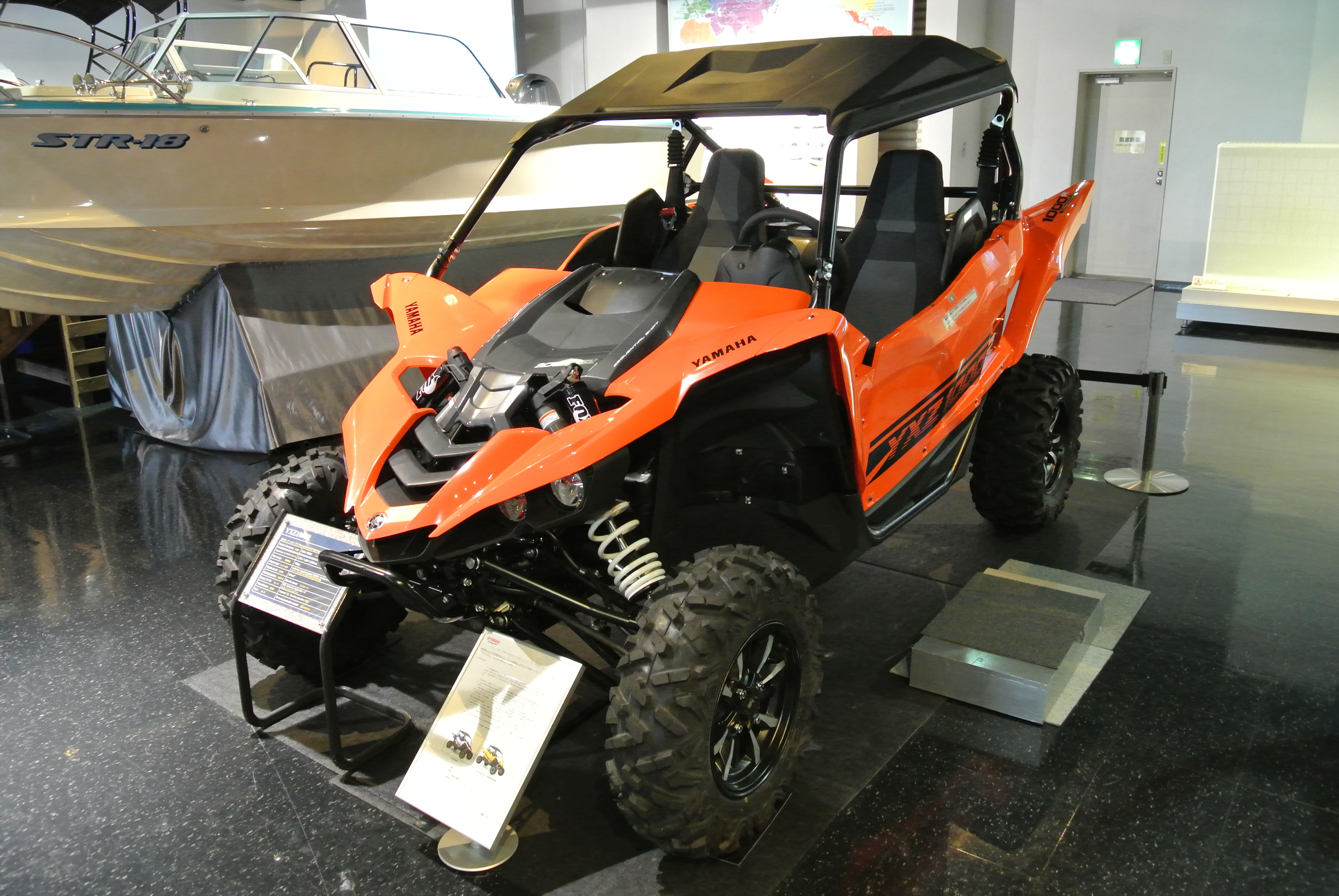
Yamaha YXZ 1000R UTV

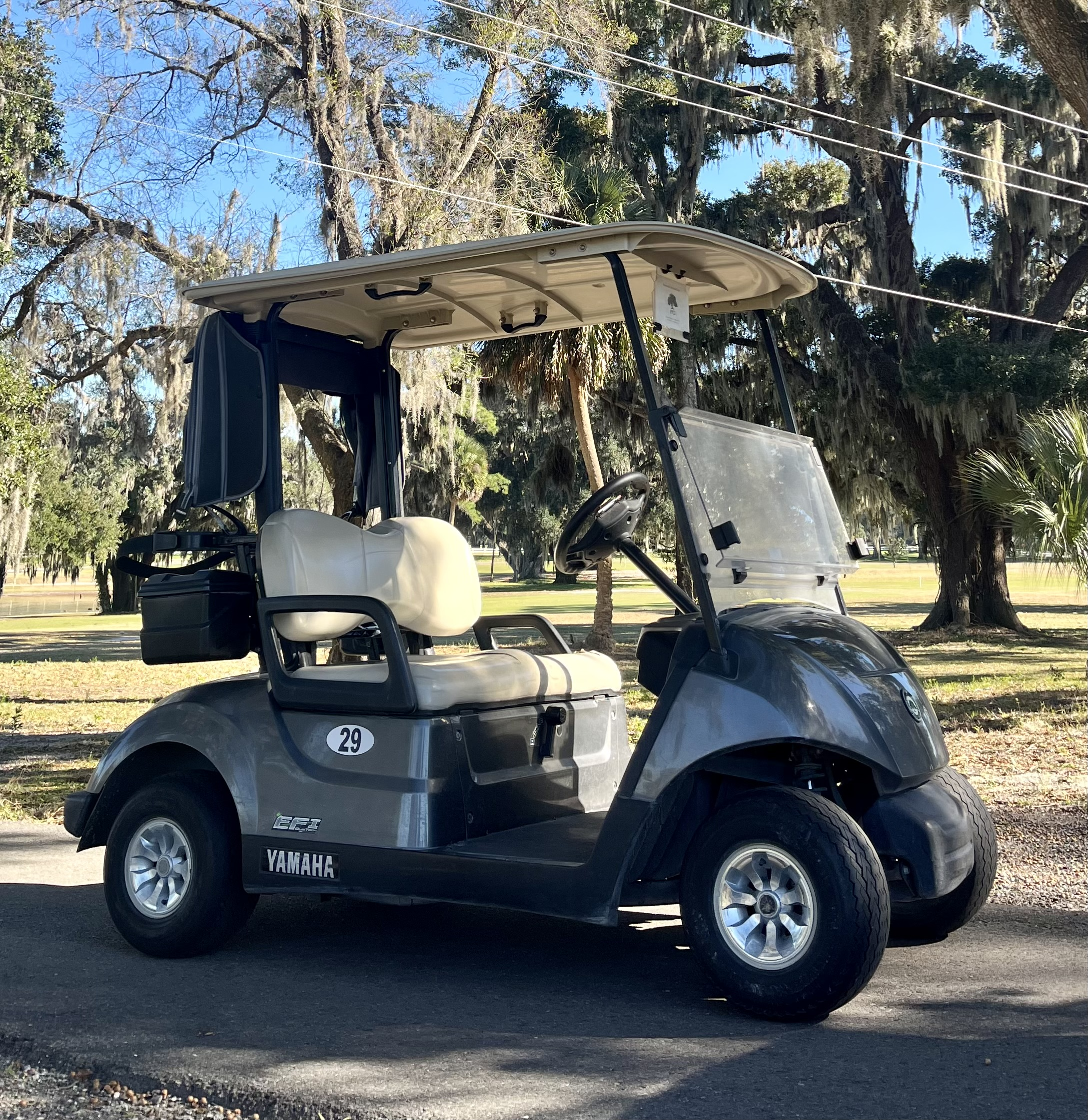
Yamaha Golf Car

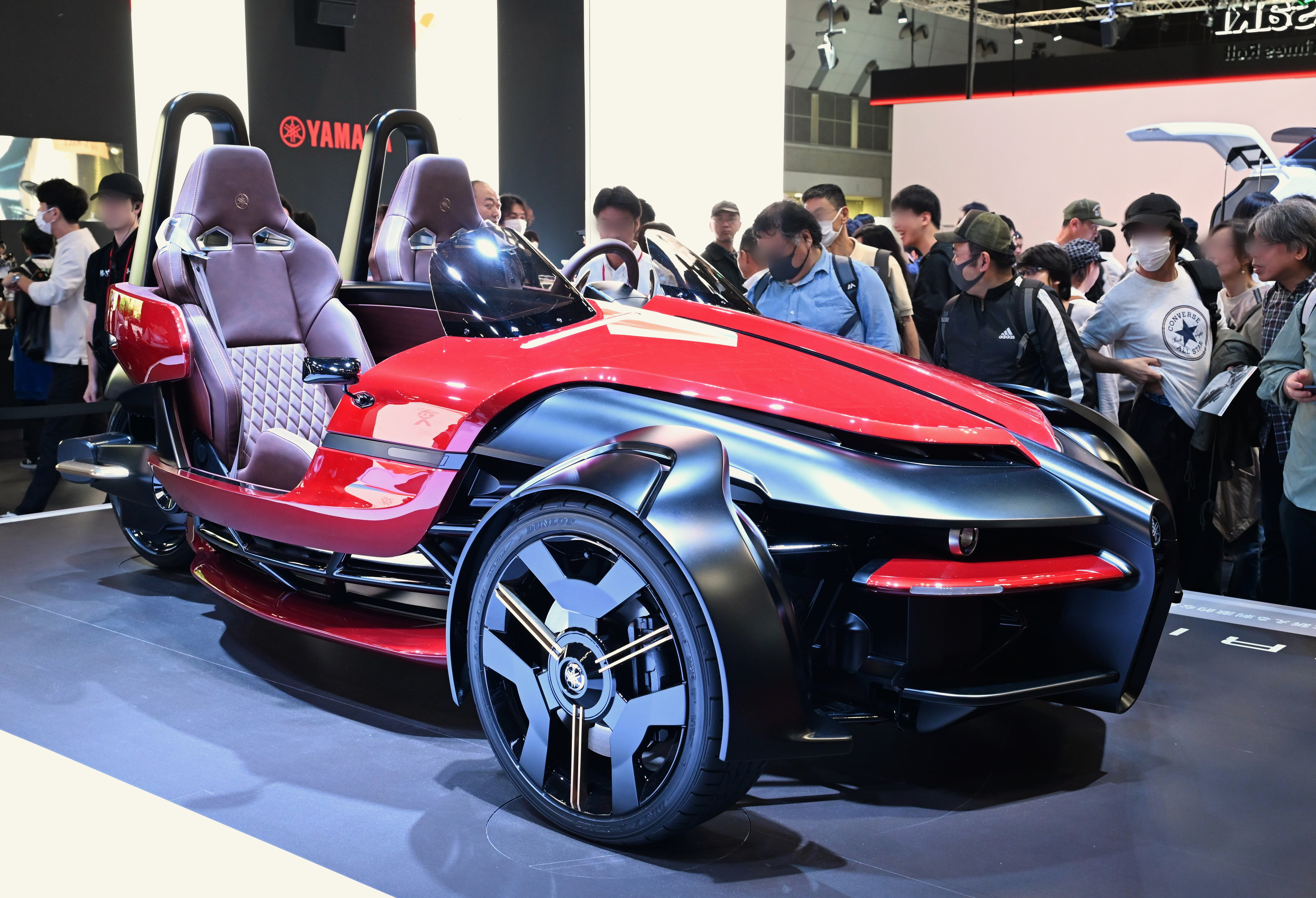
Automobiles (Tricycle)

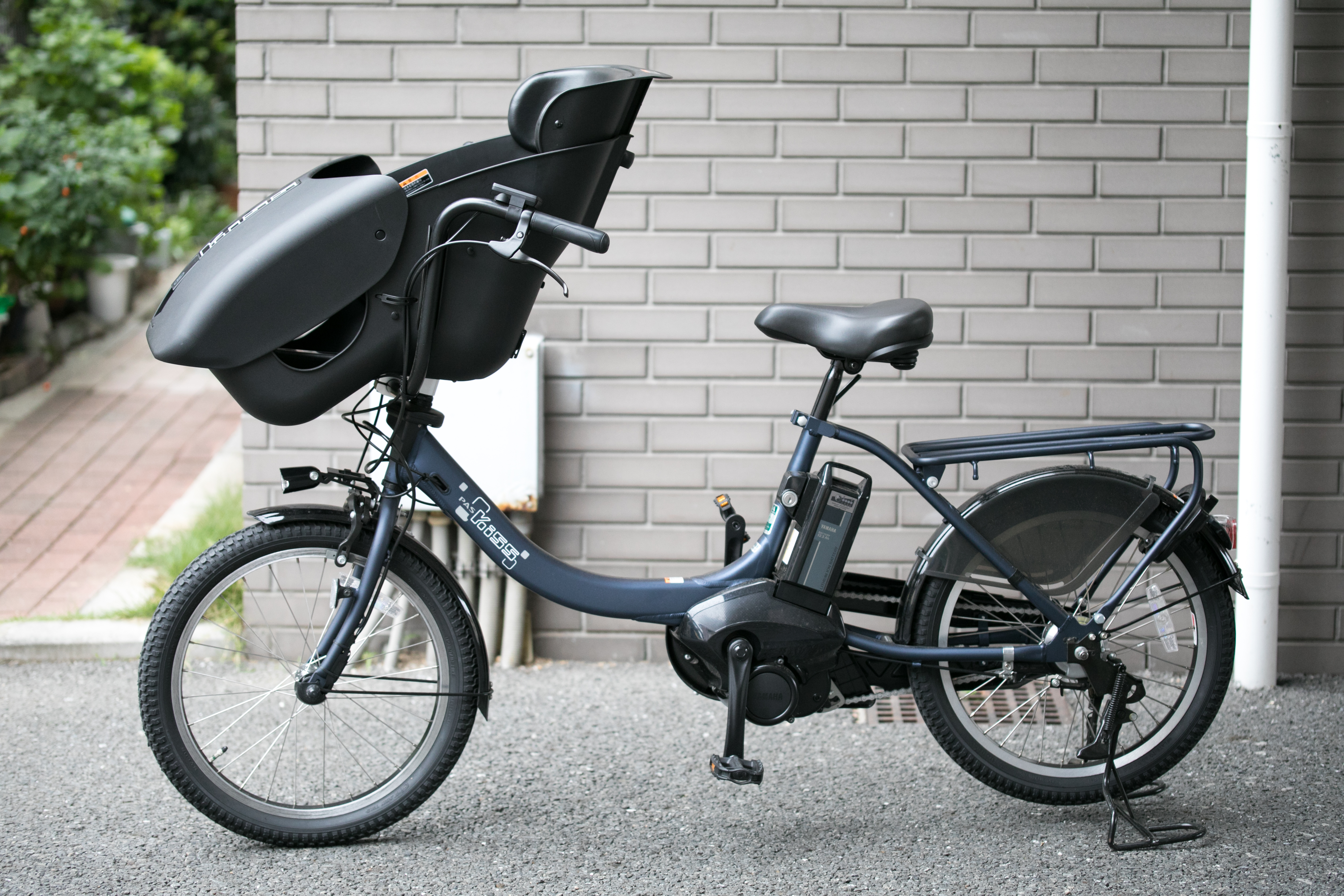
Pedelec PAS

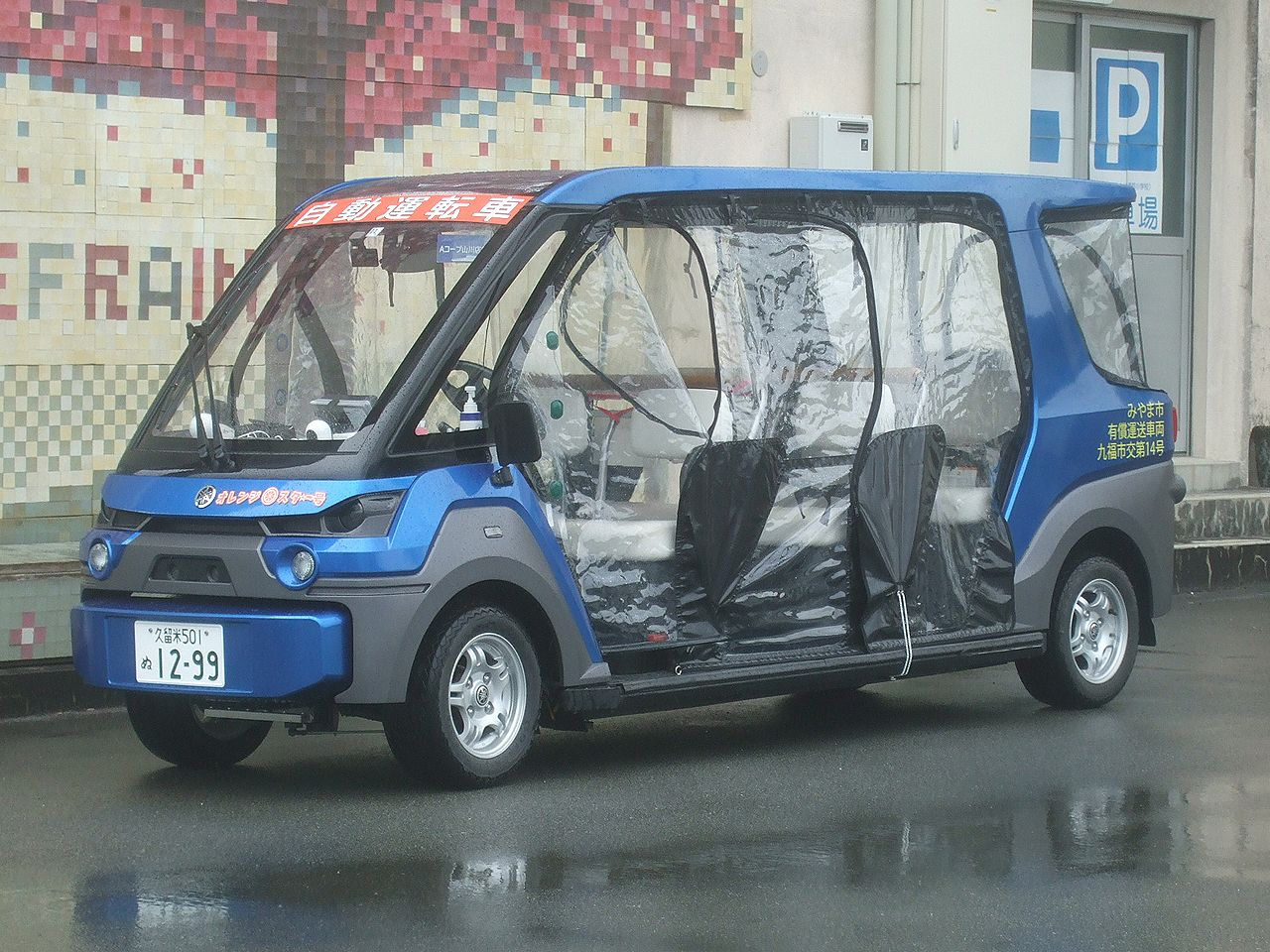
Low-speed vehicle

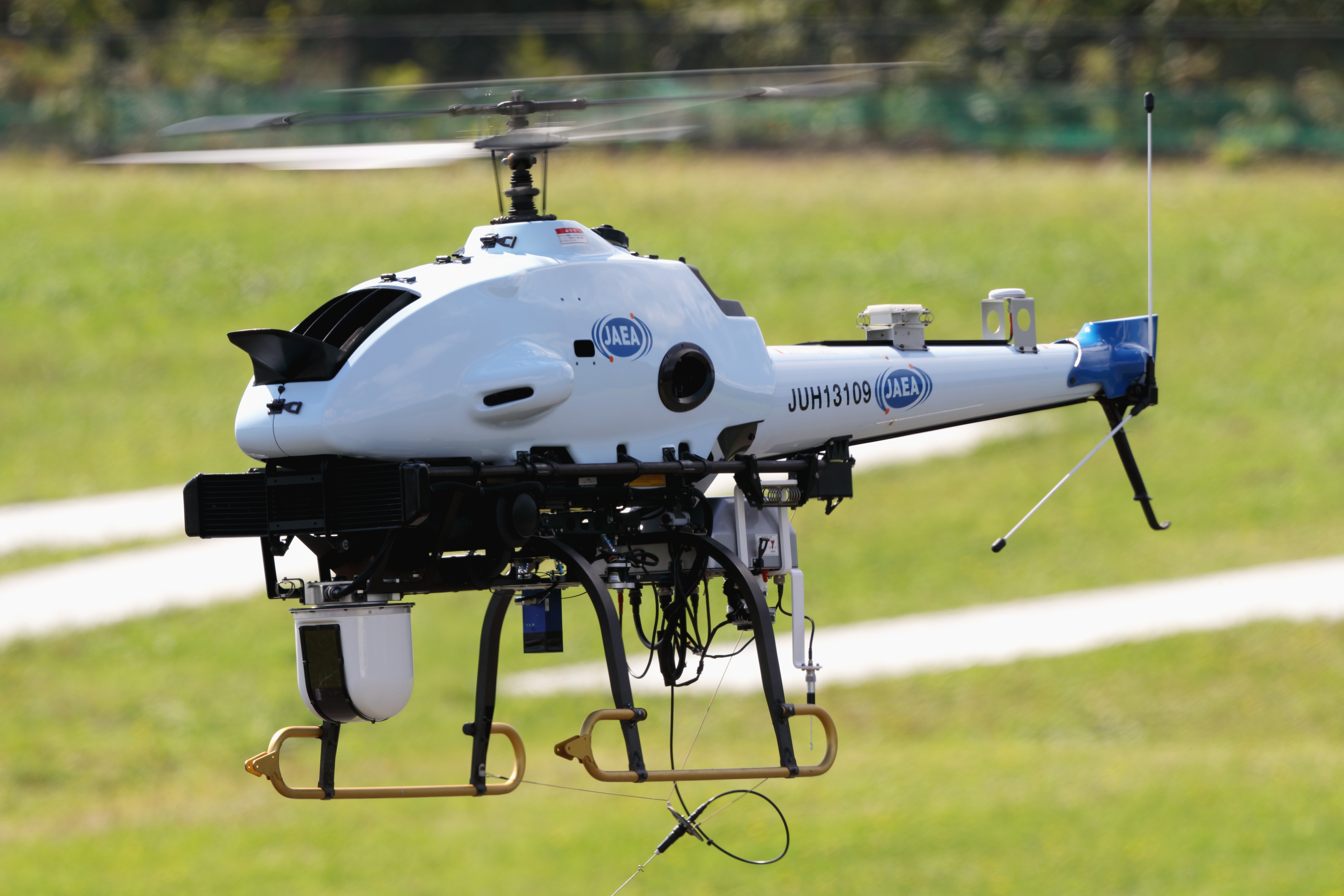
Helicopters RMAX G1

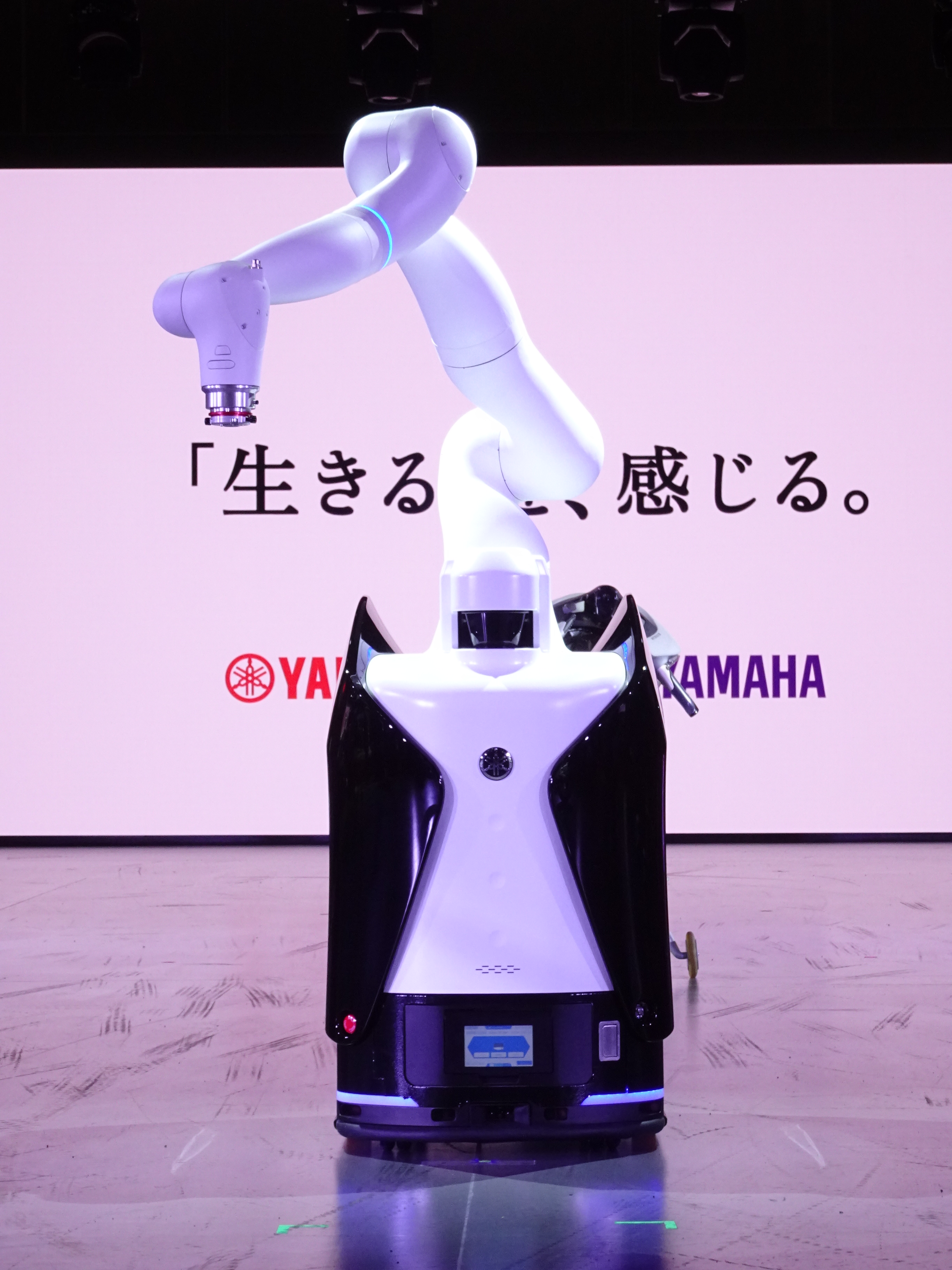
Cobot

=== Automobile engines ===
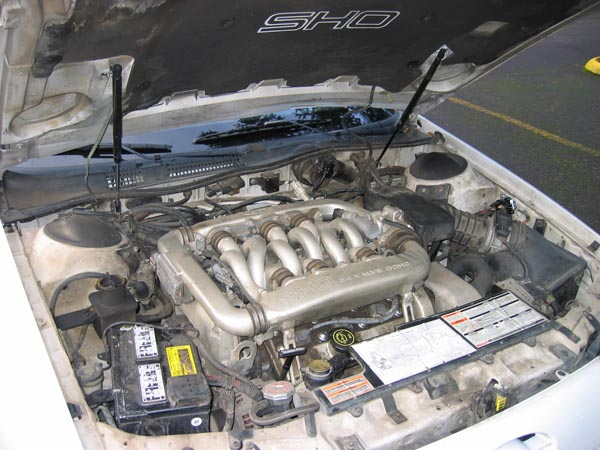
Yamaha-built DOHC V6 Ford Taurus SHO engine

Yamaha has built engines for other manufacturers' vehicles beginning with the development and production of the Toyota 2000GT (1967). The cylinder head from the Toyota 4A-GE engine was developed by Yamaha and built at Toyota's Shimayama plant alongside the 4A and 2A engines. In 1984, executives of the Yamaha Motor Corporation signed a contract with the Ford Motor Company to develop, produce, and supply compact 60° 3.0 Liter DOHC V6 engines for transverse application for the 1989–95 Ford Taurus SHO. From 1993 to 1995, the SHO engine was produced in 3.0 and 3.2 Liter versions. Yamaha jointly designed the 3.4 Liter DOHC V-8 engine with Ford for the 1996–99 SHO. Ford and Yamaha also developed the Zetec-SE branded 4-cylinder engines used in several Ford cars like the small sports car Ford Puma. From 2005 to 2010, Yamaha produced a 4.4 Litre V8 for Volvo. The B8444S engines were used in the XC90 and S80 models, whilst also adapted to 5.0L configuration for Volvo's foray into the V8 Supercars with the S60. British sportscar maker Noble also uses a bi-turbo version of the Volvo V8 in their M600. All performance-oriented cylinder heads on Toyota/Lexus engines were designed and/or built by Yamaha. Some examples are the 1LR-GUE engine found on the 2010–2012 Lexus LFA, the 2UR-GSE found in Lexus ISF, the 3S-GTE engine found on the Toyota MR2 and Toyota Celica GT4/All-Trac, the 2ZZ-GE engine found on the 1999–2006 Toyota Celica GT-S and Lotus Elise Series 2, and the Toyota 4GR-FSE engine found on the Lexus IS250. Yamaha also tunes engines for manufacturers, such as Toyota, so Yamaha logos are on Toyota S engines.

Yamaha also tried to produce a supercar in the 1990s, named the Yamaha OX99-11. It was made as a supercar to have a Yamaha Formula 1 engine as its powerplant and have Formula 1 technology in it. Even though their engines did not win a Grand Prix, by 1991 the team had produced a new engine, the OX99, and approached a German company to design an initial version of the car. Yamaha was not pleased with the result as it was too similar to sport cars of that time, so it contacted IAD to continue working on the project. By the beginning of 1992, just under 12 months after starting to work on the project, IAD came with an initial version of the car. The car's design was undertaken by Takuya Yura, and was originally conceived as a single seater; however, Yamaha requested a two-seater vehicle and a tandem seating arrangement was suggested which was in keeping with Yamaha's motorcycle expertise. This resulted in a radical and somewhat outrageous design based on Group C cars of the time, with features such as the cockpit-locking roof. It also shared the same chassis as the Formula 1 car, to try to give the consumer market a pure Formula 1 experience. Eventually disagreements with IAD over the budget made Yamaha take the project to its own Ypsilon Technology which was given six months to finish the project, otherwise it would be terminated. To make matters worse, Japan was in the midst of an economic downturn, which made Yamaha believe there would be no customers for the car, and so the project was cancelled in 1994 after many delays, with only 3 prototypes in existence.

=== Concept cars ===
Beginning in 2013 Yamaha revealed a series of concept cars developed in collaboration with Gordon Murray Design utilizing the company's iStream design process. The first concept, named the MOTIV, was revealed at the 43rd Tokyo Motor Show in 2013. The MOTIV was a compact city car designed to accommodate gasoline engines, EV drivetrains, hybrid systems, and range extenders.

The second concept, the Sports Ride Concept, was revealed at the 44th Tokyo Motor Show in 2015. The concept was a lightweight two-seat sports car that drew inspiration from the company's motorcycles. The third concept, the Cross Hub Concept, was revealed at the 45th Tokyo Motor Show in 2017. The Cross Hub was a coupé utility with a diamond-shaped sitting arrangement to allow it to carry two motorcycles in the bed while retaining compact dimensions for urban use. Yamaha confirmed at the 46th Tokyo Motor Show in 2019 that cars were no longer in the company's plans.
