= Yamaha Y125Z =

Yamaha Y125Z / Yamaha Z
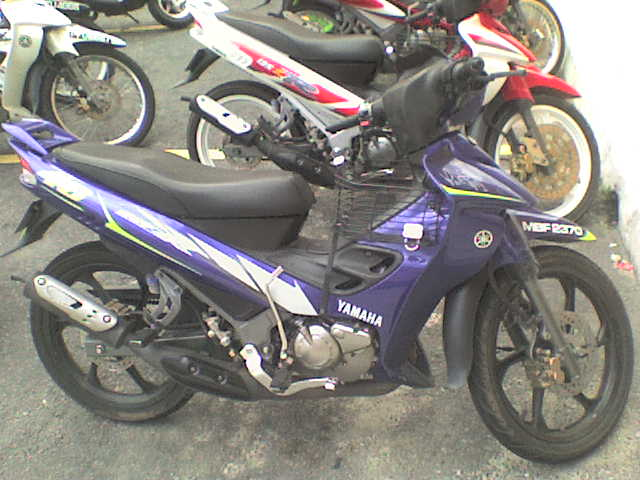
- Manufacturer: Yamaha Motor Company
- Also called: Y125Z / Y125ZR
- Production: 1998 – 2017
- Predecessor: Yamaha Y110SS / Yamaha Y110SS Two
- Class: Moped, underbone
- Engine: 124.3 cc air-cooled, 2-stroke engine Cylinder Arrangement = Forward inclined single cylinder Bore & stroke = 53.8 x 54.7 mm
- Power: 17.5 HP (13 kW) @ 12,000 rpm
- Torque: 1.85 kg·m (18.1 N·m/13.4 ft·lbf) @ 7,500 rpm
- Transmission: 6-speed
- Frame type: Twin steel tube
- Suspension: Front: Telescopic fork Rear: Monoshock swingarm
- Brakes: Front: Disc; Rear: Disc
- Tires: Front: 70/90-17 38P; Rear: 80/90-17 44P
- Rake, trail: 27° / 82 mm (3.2 in)
- Wheelbase: 1,250 mm (49 in)
- Dimensions: L: 1,900 mm (75 in); W: 675 mm (26.6 in); H: 1,035 mm (40.7 in)
- Seat height: 752 mm (29.6 in)
- Weight: 101 kg (223 lb) (dry)
- Fuel capacity: 5.5 L (1.5 US gal)
- Related: Yamaha RX-Z; Yamaha Y135LC

Yamaha Y125Z or better known as Yamaha Z (in Europe, Indonesia, Thailand and Vietnam) is a 125 cc two-stroke moped or underbone motorcycle produced by Yamaha. Debuted in 1998 as a successor of Yamaha Y110SS, the Y125Z was the first two-stroke underbone motorcycle with an YEIS catalytic converter. Beside being sold in most Southeast Asian countries especially in Malaysia and Singapore, it was also sold in Greece. The production of the Y125Z ended in 2017 after being sold for more than two decades.

== Yamaha Y125Z in motorsports ==
The Yamaha Y125Z is widely used in motorcycle racing tournaments held in Malaysia or Asean level. In Malaysia, the Y125Z is formerly used in the Expert category of Malaysian Cub Prix tournament series.
