= Mat Rempit =

Malaysian youth subculture

An illustration of a Mat Rempit

A Mat Rempit is a Malaysian term for an individual (usually a youngster) who participates in hooliganism and illegal activities such as street racing, stunt biking, petty crime, and public disturbance using a motorcycle. These individuals usually ride underbone 2-stroke or 4-stroke motorcycles common in Southeast Asia, locally known colloquially as kapcai or scooters.

Mat Rempits are often seen on Malaysian streets, where they gather in groups and race against one another, or otherwise engage in dangerous activities such as night races and stunts (e.g. wheelies, Superman (lying flat on the seat), wikang and scorpion (standing on the seat with one leg during a wheelie). There have been cases where they openly break the law and rebel against authorities, running through roadblocks, riding against the traffic, or hitting police officers with their motorbikes. Mat Rempits often race or perform stunts without proper safety gear while using improperly-equipped or illegally modified bikes. This often leads to accidents, causing major injuries or death, both to themselves and innocent bystanders.

== Etymology ==
The word "Rempit" comes from "ramp-(rev)-it" (ramp the throttle). According to the Kamus Dewan, the definition of "Rempit" is "the act of whipping with a cane". A possible alternative source of the word is derived from the noise made by a 2-stroke motorcycle. "Mat" is a slang term used to refer to a male person who is usually of Malay descent.

== Organisation and traits ==
Mat Rempits usually gather in groups in bustling city centers on weekend nights. These gatherings are often followed by impromptu performances of stunts or races along a stretch of road. The term "Mat Rempit" itself usually come with the negative connotation of illegal activities, ranging from petty crimes such as public disturbance and reckless riding, to more serious ones such as gangsterism, robbery, street fighting, assault, vandalism, substance abuse, theft and bullying. Most motorcycles used by the Mat Rempits do not meet standard specifications, or have been modified extensively for greater speed. Many Mat Rempits also opt to install aftermarket exhausts for their higher performance and loud noise.

Additionally, most Mat Rempits do not have valid motorcycle licenses, do not pay road taxes, and ride stolen motorcycles. A growing number of housing estates have also been turned into racing tracks. It is estimated that there are about 200,000 Mat Rempits in Malaysia.

== Violence ==
In April 2009, Malaysia's Inspector-General of Police Musa Hassan said that the Mat Rempit had become violent and brazen instead of just being a public nuisance. He said "we have to come down hard on the Mat Rempit who have started to become involved in robberies, snatch thefts and are even attacking innocent road users and we also need to use harsh tactics to catch the Mat Rempit that try to runaway from the roadblocks". He also added that "parents must be more responsible and should not allow their underage children to drive cars or ride motorcycles".

Mat Rempits often end up being hospitalised with varying degrees of injury after failing to perform their actions or stunts such as 'superman', 'spider' and many more. Every weekend, a number of Mat Rempits were hospitalised after being involved in accidents from high-speed racing and/or stunts.

According to Selangor police chief Tun Hisan Tun Hamzah, it was the parents who are the ones who should be blamed on this and while Kuala Lumpur deputy police chief, Amar Singh said that it was due to lack of parents' attention, Amar also pointed out that especially when they are in a big group, they would act aggressively by attacking the authorities and challenging traffic laws indiscriminately. He further pointed out that their peers will challenge them to do something outrageous like assaulting police officers and challenging road rules, just to prove that they're not cowards."

== Political reaction ==
The widespread phenomenon of the subculture has driven some politicians in Malaysia to voice out concern and need to help rehabilitate the people involved in activities pertaining to that culture. Khairy Jamaluddin and Abdul Azeez Abdul Rahim, who were formerly mat rempit. Khairy says that they "should become the "Eyes and Ears" of Malaysian"

In 2006, a Member of Parliament representing Jenderak, Pahang suggested that the Mat Rempit should be accepted and guided to save them from indulging in dangerous activities.

In 2008, newspaper Kosmo! reported that the Mat Rempit in the state of Kelantan would be allowed to show off their skills at a special track to be built by the state government in Tanah Merah. The then-Menteri Besar, Nik Abdul Aziz Nik Mat said amidst the criticism that the track was not a waste of money, stating:

They (the Mat Rempit) always make their mothers and wives worry. With the track they will have a proper place to express their feelings and show their bravery and heroics...

The Kelantan approach was noted of by the neighbouring state Kedah, where its state government looked into the possibility of building such an infrastructure, to "overcome the menace", saying another option was to create more job opportunities for them as most of them were jobless. The former state's Chief Minister Azizan Abdul Razak said "we will first study if the circuit in Kelantan has effectively curbed the menace".

== Enforcement operations ==
On 3 May 2009, the Bukit Aman Traffic Division of the Royal Malaysian Police, together with the Road Transport Department, launched a major integrated operation to crack down on both car and Mat Rempit motorcycle illegal racing. More than 115 motorcycles were impounded in the major operation which was held simultaneously in Kuala Lumpur, Selangor, Penang and Negeri Sembilan.

== In the media ==
The subculture surrounding the Mat Rempit has been the focus of numerous films and songs in Malaysia.

Film depictions of the subculture began (and made popular) in 1984 with Gila-Gila Remaja, Ali Setan (1985), Litar Kasih (1996), KL Menjerit (2002) and its prequel KL Menjerit 1 (2005), REMP-IT (2006), Bohsia: Jangan Pilih Jalan Hitam (2009), Adnan Semp-It (2010) and V3 Samseng Jalanan (2010).

Deejays JJ and Rudy (The Morning Crew) from hitz.fm radio station have made a parody of Teriyaki Boyz's called We're Not So Furious, designed to mock Mat Rempit culture.

=== Songs on Mat Rempit subculture ===
- Kazar – Memburu Impian (from Gila-Gila Remaja)
- Spider – Salut (from Bintang 12)
- Namewee – Kawanku
- Yazer featuring Doul – Rempit
- Ustaz Akhil Hayy Rawa – Relaku Rempit (parodying Spider's song called Relaku Pujuk)
- JJ and Rudy (The Morning Crew) from hitz.fm – Not So Furious (parodying Teriyaki Boyz's called Tokyo Drift)
- Fairuz Hafeez – Kisah Mat Rempit / Mat Rempit Jatuh Tergolek

== See also ==
- Motorcycle hooliganism
- Street racing
- Kapcai, commonly driven by Mat Rempits
- Tafheet, illegal street racing in Saudi Arabia
- Preman, the Indonesian counterpart
- Bōsōzoku, the Japanese counterpart
- Ah Beng, the partially similar Malaysian Chinese counterpart to the Mat Rempit
- List of subcultures
