= Yamaha RX-Z =

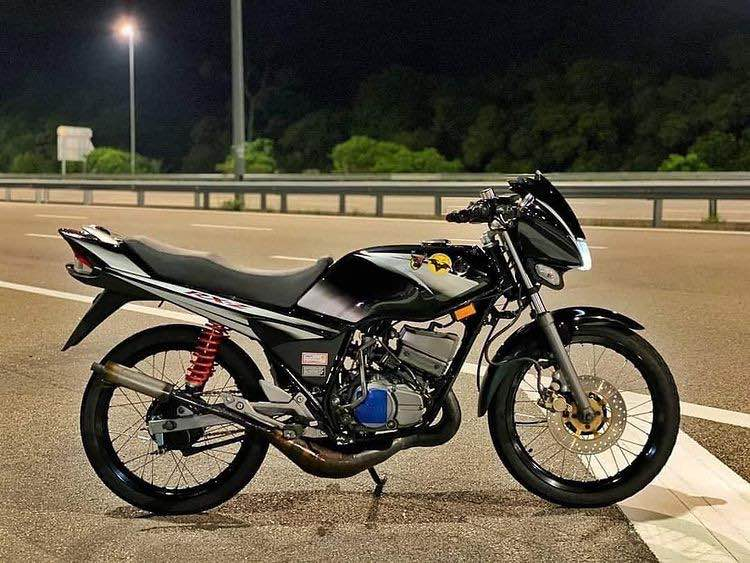
- 2007 RX-Z Catalyzer modified for highway racing in Malaysia.
- Manufacturer: Yamaha Motor Company
- Parent company: Yamaha Corporation
- Production: April 1985 – July 2011
- Class: Naked bike
- Engine: 133 cc (8.1 cu in) two-stroke,
- Bore / stroke: 56.0 mm × 54.0 mm (2.20 in × 2.13 in)
- Compression ratio: 7.0:1
- Power: 20 hp (15 kW) @ 8,500 rpm
- Torque: 1.85 kgf (4.1 lbf) @ 7,500 rpm
- Transmission: 5-speed (first generation 1985 to 1987) / 6-speed (still the 1st generation from 1988 to 1989 to the 2nd generation from 1990 until the last generation from 2004 to 2011) manual transmission
- Suspension: Front: Telescopic fork Rear: Dual shocks swingarm
- Brakes: Front: Disc; Rear: Drum
- Tires: 80/90-18 45H front, 90/90-18 51H rear
- Wheelbase: 1,300 mm (51 in)
- Dimensions: L: 1,990 mm (78 in); W: 725 mm (28.5 in); H: 1,160 mm (46 in)
- Seat height: 770 mm (30 in)
- Weight: 106 kg (234 lb) (dry) n/a (wet)
- Fuel capacity: 13 L (3.4 US gal)
- Related: Yamaha RX-King 135; Yamaha Y125Z

The Yamaha RX-Z 135 was a two-stroke naked bike manufactured by Yamaha Motor Corporation. It was introduced in April 1985 and sold in Malaysia, Singapore and Thailand. Production ended in July 2011.

== Overview ==
The first generation of the RX-Z, released in 1985, was equipped with a five-speed transmission and a front disc brake. The model used the same platform as its predecessor, the RX-K 135. In 1990, the RX-Z was updated and came with a six-speed transmission. It also came with the Yamaha Computerized Lubrication System (YCLS), along with a redesigned front cowl and updated gauge cluster. The third-generation RX-Z was introduced in 2004 with a redesign and the addition of a catalytic converter. Yamaha discontinued the RX-Z in 2011.
